= 2018–19 UEFA Nations League B =

Tournament details
- Dates: 6 September – 20 November 2018
- Teams: 12
- Promoted: Bosnia and Herzegovina; Denmark; Sweden; Ukraine

Tournament statistics
- Matches played: 24
- Goals scored: 48 (2 per match)
- Attendance: 549,676 (22,903 per match)
- Top scorer(s): (Bosnia and Herzegovina) Edin Džeko (Czech Republic) Patrik Schick (3 goals each)

The 2018–19 UEFA Nations League B was the second division of the 2018–19 edition of the UEFA Nations League, the inaugural season of the international football competition involving the men's national teams of the 55 member associations of UEFA.

== Format ==
League B consisted of 12 UEFA members ranked from 13 to 24, split into four groups of three. The winners of each group were promoted to the 2020–21 UEFA Nations League A. The third-placed team of each group was initially to be relegated to the 2020–21 UEFA Nations League C, but remained in League B following UEFA's reformatting of the next edition's groups.

In addition, League B was allocated one of the four remaining UEFA Euro 2020 places. Four teams from League B which had not already qualified for the European Championship finals competed in the play-offs for each division, which were played in October and November 2020. The play-off berths were first allocated to the group winners, and if any of the group winners had already qualified for the European Championship finals, then to the next best ranked team of the division, etc. If there were fewer than four teams in League B which had not already qualified for the European Championship finals, the play-off berths would be allocated via one of two methods:

- If League B had a group winner selected for the play-offs, the next best team in the overall ranking from a lower league would be selected.
- If League B had no group winner available, the best team in the overall ranking would be selected.

The playoffs consisted of two "one-off" semi-finals (best-ranked team hosts the lowest-ranked team and second best-ranked team hosts the third best-ranked team and one "one-off" final between the two semi-final winners (venue drawn in advance between semi-final 1 and 2).

=== Seeding ===
Teams were allocated to League B according to their UEFA national team coefficients after the conclusion of the 2018 FIFA World Cup qualifying group stage on 11 October 2017. Teams were split into three pots of four teams, ordered based on their UEFA national team coefficient. The seeding pots for the draw were announced on 7 December 2017.

Pot 1
Team	Coeff	Rank
Austria	29,418	13
Wales	29,269	14
Russia	29,258	15
Slovakia	28,555	16

Pot 2
Team	Coeff	Rank
Sweden	28,487	17
Ukraine	28,286	18
Republic of Ireland	28,249	19
Bosnia and Herzegovina	28,200	20

Pot 3
Team	Coeff	Rank
Northern Ireland	27,127	21
Denmark	27,052	22
Czech Republic	27,028	23
Turkey	26,538	24

The group draw took place at the SwissTech Convention Center in Lausanne, Switzerland on 24 January 2018, 12:00 CET. For political reasons, Russia and Ukraine could not be drawn into the same group (due to the Russian military intervention in Ukraine).

== Groups ==
The fixture list was confirmed by UEFA on 24 January 2018 following the draw.

Times are CET/CEST, (Note: CEST (UTC+2) for matchdays 1–4 (September and October 2018), CET (UTC+1) for matchdays 5–6 (November 2018).) as listed by UEFA (local times, if different, are in parentheses).

=== Group 1 ===
Pos	Team	Pld	W	D	L	GF	GA	GD	Pts	Promotion (Note: Due to revamp of the format for the 2020–21 UEFA Nations League, no teams were eventually relegated.)	(Ukraine)	(Czech Republic)	(Slovakia)
1	Ukraine (P)	4	3	0	1	5	5	0	9	Promotion to League A	—	1–0	1–0
2	Czech Republic	4	2	0	2	4	4	0	6		1–2	—	1–0
3	Slovakia	4	1	0	3	5	5	0	3		4–1	1–2	—

Source: UEFA
Rules for classification: Tiebreakers
(P) Promoted
Notes:
6 September 2018
21:00 (Note: The Czech Republic v Ukraine match, originally scheduled for 20:45 CEST, was delayed to 21:00 CEST due to floodlight failure.)

Czech Republic	1–2	Ukraine
Schick 4'	Report	Konoplyanka 45+1'; Zinchenko 90+3'

Městský fotbalový stadion, Uherské Hradiště
Attendance: 7,974
Referee: Anthony Taylor (England)

9 September 2018
15:00 (16:00 UTC+3)

Ukraine	1–0	Slovakia
Yarmolenko 80' (pen.)	Report

Arena Lviv, Lviv
Attendance: 121 (Note: The Ukraine v Slovakia match was played behind closed doors due to a UEFA punishment against Ukraine for the display of a banner with racist symbols in their UEFA Euro 2016 qualifying home match against Spain.)
Referee: Anastasios Sidiropoulos (Greece)

13 October 2018
15:00

Slovakia	1–2	Czech Republic
Hamšík 62'	Report	Krmenčík 52'; Schick 76'

Štadión Antona Malatinského, Trnava
Attendance: 17,251
Referee: Slavko Vinčić (Slovenia)

16 October 2018
20:45 (21:45 UTC+3)

Ukraine	1–0	Czech Republic
Malinovskyi 43'	Report

Metalist Stadium, Kharkiv
Attendance: 38,100
Referee: Gediminas Mažeika (Lithuania)

16 November 2018
20:45

Slovakia	4–1	Ukraine
Rusnák 6'; Kucka 26'; Zreľák 52'; Mak 61'	Report	Konoplyanka 47'

Štadión Antona Malatinského, Trnava
Attendance: 9,764
Referee: Nikola Dabanović (Montenegro)

19 November 2018
20:45

Czech Republic	1–0	Slovakia
Schick 32'	Report

Sinobo Stadium, Prague
Attendance: 16,623
Referee: Alejandro Hernández Hernández (Spain)

=== Group 2 ===
Pos	Team	Pld	W	D	L	GF	GA	GD	Pts	Promotion (Note: Due to revamp of the format for the 2020–21 UEFA Nations League, no teams were eventually relegated.)	(Sweden)	(Russia)	(Turkey)
1	Sweden (P)	4	2	1	1	5	3	+2	7 (Note: Head-to-head points: Sweden 4, Russia 1.)	Promotion to League A	—	2–0	2–3
2	Russia	4	2	1	1	4	3	+1	7		0–0	—	2–0
3	Turkey	4	1	0	3	4	7	−3	3		0–1	1–2	—

Source: UEFA
Rules for classification: Tiebreakers
(P) Promoted
Notes:
7 September 2018
20:45 (21:45 UTC+3)

Turkey	1–2	Russia
Aziz 41'	Report	Cheryshev 13'; Dzyuba 49'

Şenol Güneş Stadium, Trabzon
Attendance: 29,702
Referee: Artur Soares Dias (Portugal)

10 September 2018
20:45

Sweden	2–3	Turkey
Kiese Thelin 35'; Claesson 49'	Report	Çalhanoğlu 51'; E. Akbaba 88', 90+2'

Friends Arena, Solna
Attendance: 21,832
Referee: Jesús Gil Manzano (Spain)

11 October 2018
21:45

Russia	0–0	Sweden
	Report

Kaliningrad Stadium, Kaliningrad
Attendance: 31,698
Referee: Luca Banti (Italy)

14 October 2018
18:00 (19:00 UTC+3)

Russia	2–0	Turkey
Neustädter 20'; Cheryshev 78'	Report

Fisht Olympic Stadium, Sochi
Attendance: 38,288
Referee: Paweł Raczkowski (Poland)

17 November 2018
18:00 (20:00 UTC+3)

Turkey	0–1	Sweden
	Report	Granqvist 71' (pen.)

Konya Büyükşehir Stadium, Konya
Attendance: 37,425
Referee: István Kovács (Romania)

20 November 2018
20:45

Sweden	2–0	Russia
Lindelöf 41'; Berg 72'	Report

Friends Arena, Solna
Attendance: 20,223
Referee: Benoît Bastien (France)

=== Group 3 ===
Pos	Team	Pld	W	D	L	GF	GA	GD	Pts	Promotion (Note: Due to revamp of the format for the 2020–21 UEFA Nations League, no teams were eventually relegated.)	(Bosnia and Herzegovina)	(Austria)	(Northern Ireland)
1	Bosnia and Herzegovina (P)	4	3	1	0	5	1	+4	10	Promotion to League A	—	1–0	2–0
2	Austria	4	2	1	1	3	2	+1	7		0–0	—	1–0
3	Northern Ireland	4	0	0	4	2	7	−5	0		1–2	1–2	—

Source: UEFA
Rules for classification: Tiebreakers
(P) Promoted
Notes:
8 September 2018
15:00 (14:00 UTC+1)

Northern Ireland	1–2	Bosnia and Herzegovina
Grigg 90+3'	Report	Duljević 36'; Sarić 64'

Windsor Park, Belfast
Attendance: 16,942
Referee: Pavel Královec (Czech Republic)

11 September 2018
20:45

Bosnia and Herzegovina	1–0	Austria
Džeko 78'	Report

Bilino Polje Stadium, Zenica
Attendance: 9,100
Referee: Ruddy Buquet (France)

12 October 2018
20:45

Austria	1–0	Northern Ireland
Arnautović 71'	Report

Ernst-Happel-Stadion, Vienna
Attendance: 22,300
Referee: Georgi Kabakov (Bulgaria)

15 October 2018
20:45

Bosnia and Herzegovina	2–0	Northern Ireland
Džeko 27', 73'	Report

Stadion Grbavica, Sarajevo
Attendance: 11,050
Referee: Mattias Gestranius (Finland)

15 November 2018
20:45

Austria	0–0	Bosnia and Herzegovina
	Report

Ernst-Happel-Stadion, Vienna
Attendance: 37,200
Referee: Andrew Dallas (Scotland)

18 November 2018
18:00 (17:00 UTC+0)

Northern Ireland	1–2	Austria
C. Evans 57'	Report	Schlager 49'; Lazaro 90+3'

Windsor Park, Belfast
Attendance: 17,895
Referee: Jonathan Lardot (Belgium)

=== Group 4 ===
Pos	Team	Pld	W	D	L	GF	GA	GD	Pts	Promotion (Note: Due to revamp of the format for the 2020–21 UEFA Nations League, no teams were eventually relegated.)	(Denmark)	(Wales)	(Republic of Ireland)
1	Denmark (P)	4	2	2	0	4	1	+3	8	Promotion to League A	—	2–0	0–0
2	Wales	4	2	0	2	6	5	+1	6		1–2	—	4–1
3	Republic of Ireland	4	0	2	2	1	5	−4	2		0–0	0–1	—

Source: UEFA
Rules for classification: Tiebreakers
(P) Promoted
Notes:
6 September 2018
20:45 (19:45 UTC+1)

Wales	4–1	Republic of Ireland
Lawrence 6'; Bale 18'; Ramsey 37'; C. Roberts 55'	Report	S. Williams 66'

Cardiff City Stadium, Cardiff
Attendance: 25,657
Referee: Clément Turpin (France)

9 September 2018
18:00

Denmark	2–0	Wales
Eriksen 32', 63' (pen.)	Report

Aarhus Stadium, Aarhus
Attendance: 17,506
Referee: Deniz Aytekin (Germany)

13 October 2018
20:45 (19:45 UTC+1)

Republic of Ireland	0–0	Denmark
	Report

Aviva Stadium, Dublin
Attendance: 41,220
Referee: Xavier Estrada Fernández (Spain)

16 October 2018
20:45 (19:45 UTC+1)

Republic of Ireland	0–1	Wales
	Report	Wilson 58'

Aviva Stadium, Dublin
Attendance: 38,321
Referee: Björn Kuipers (Netherlands)

16 November 2018
20:45 (19:45 UTC+0)

Wales	1–2	Denmark
Bale 89'	Report	N. Jørgensen 42'; Braithwaite 88'

Cardiff City Stadium, Cardiff
Attendance: 32,354
Referee: Ivan Kružliak (Slovakia)

19 November 2018
20:45

Denmark	0–0	Republic of Ireland
	Report

Aarhus Stadium, Aarhus
Attendance: 11,130
Referee: Aliyar Aghayev (Azerbaijan)

== Goalscorers ==
There were 48 goals scored in 24 matches, for an average of 2 goals per match.

3 goals

- (Bosnia and Herzegovina) Edin Džeko
- (Czech Republic) Patrik Schick

2 goals

- (Denmark) Christian Eriksen
- (Russia) Denis Cheryshev
- (Turkey) Emre Akbaba
- (Ukraine) Yevhen Konoplyanka
- (Wales) Gareth Bale

1 goal

- (Austria) Marko Arnautović
- (Austria) Valentino Lazaro
- (Austria) Xaver Schlager
- (Bosnia and Herzegovina) Haris Duljević
- (Bosnia and Herzegovina) Elvis Sarić
- (Czech Republic) Michael Krmenčík
- (Denmark) Martin Braithwaite
- (Denmark) Nicolai Jørgensen
- (Northern Ireland) Corry Evans
- (Northern Ireland) Will Grigg
- (Republic of Ireland) Shaun Williams
- (Russia) Artem Dzyuba
- (Russia) Roman Neustädter
- (Slovakia) Marek Hamšík
- (Slovakia) Juraj Kucka
- (Slovakia) Róbert Mak
- (Slovakia) Albert Rusnák
- (Slovakia) Adam Zreľák
- (Sweden) Marcus Berg
- (Sweden) Viktor Claesson
- (Sweden) Andreas Granqvist
- (Sweden) Isaac Kiese Thelin
- (Sweden) Victor Lindelöf
- (Turkey) Serdar Aziz
- (Turkey) Hakan Çalhanoğlu
- (Ukraine) Ruslan Malinovskyi
- (Ukraine) Andriy Yarmolenko
- (Ukraine) Oleksandr Zinchenko
- (Wales) Tom Lawrence
- (Wales) Aaron Ramsey
- (Wales) Connor Roberts
- (Wales) Harry Wilson

== Overall ranking ==
The 12 League B teams were ranked 13th to 24th overall in the 2018–19 UEFA Nations League according to the following rules:

- The teams finishing first in the groups were ranked 13th to 16th according to the results of the league phase.
- The teams finishing second in the groups were ranked 17th to 20th according to the results of the league phase.
- The teams finishing third in the groups were ranked 21st to 24th according to the results of the league phase.

Rnk	Grp	Team	Pld	W	D	L	GF	GA	GD	Pts
13	B3	Bosnia and Herzegovina	4	3	1	0	5	1	+4	10
14	B1	Ukraine	4	3	0	1	5	5	0	9
15	B4	Denmark	4	2	2	0	4	1	+3	8
16	B2	Sweden	4	2	1	1	5	3	+2	7
17	B2	Russia	4	2	1	1	4	3	+1	7
18	B3	Austria	4	2	1	1	3	2	+1	7
19	B4	Wales	4	2	0	2	6	5	+1	6
20	B1	Czech Republic	4	2	0	2	4	4	0	6
21	B1	Slovakia	4	1	0	3	5	5	0	3
22	B2	Turkey	4	1	0	3	4	7	−3	3
23	B4	Republic of Ireland	4	0	2	2	1	5	−4	2
24	B3	Northern Ireland	4	0	0	4	2	7	−5	0

Source: UEFA
Rules for classification: Ranking criteria

== Prize money ==
The prize money to be distributed was announced in March 2018. Each team in League B received a solidarity fee of €1 million. In addition, the four group winners received double this amount with a €1M bonus fee. This meant that the maximum amount of solidarity and bonus fees for a team from League B was €2M.

== Euro 2020 qualifying play-offs ==
The four best teams in League B according to the overall ranking that did not qualify for UEFA Euro 2020 through the qualifying group stage competed in the play-offs, with the winners qualifying for the final tournament. If there had been fewer than four teams in League B that had not qualified, the remaining slots would have been allocated to teams from another league, according to the overall ranking.

League B
Rank	Team
13 ^{GW}	Bosnia and Herzegovina
14 ^{GW}	Ukraine
15 ^{GW}	Denmark
16 ^{GW}	Sweden
17	Russia
18	Austria
19	Wales
20	Czech Republic
21	Slovakia
22	Turkey
23	Republic of Ireland
24	Northern Ireland

Key

1. ^{GW} Nations League group winner
2. ^{H} UEFA Euro 2020 host at the time of the draw
3. Team advanced to play-offs
4. Team qualified directly to final tournament
