= 2018–19 UEFA Nations League A =

Tournament details
- Dates: League phase: 6 September – 20 November 2018; Nations League Finals: 5–9 June 2019
- Teams: 12

Final positions
- Champions: Portugal (1st title)
- Runners-up: Netherlands
- Third place: England
- Fourth place: Switzerland

Tournament statistics
- Matches played: 28
- Goals scored: 81 (2.89 per match)
- Attendance: 1,143,530 (40,840 per match)
- Top scorer: (Switzerland) Haris Seferovic (5 goals)

The 2018–19 UEFA Nations League A was the top division of the 2018–19 edition of the UEFA Nations League, the inaugural season of the international football competition involving the men's national teams of the 55 member associations of UEFA. League A culminated with the Nations League Finals in June 2019, which crowned Portugal as the inaugural champions of the UEFA Nations League.

== Format ==
League A consisted of the top 12 ranked UEFA members, split into four groups of three. The winners of each group advanced to the UEFA Nations League Finals. The third-placed team of each group was initially to be relegated to the 2020–21 UEFA Nations League B, but remained in League A following UEFA's reformatting of the next edition's groups.

The Nations League Finals took place in June 2019 and was played in a knockout format, consisting of the semi-finals, third place play-off, and final. The semi-final pairings, along with the administrative home teams for the third place play-off and final, were determined by means of an open draw on 3 December 2018. Host country Portugal was selected among the four qualified teams on 3 December 2018 by the UEFA Executive Committee, with the winners of the final crowned as the inaugural champions of the UEFA Nations League.

The four group winners were drawn into groups of five teams for the UEFA Euro 2020 qualifying competition (in order to accommodate for the Nations League Finals). In addition, League A was allocated one of the four remaining UEFA Euro 2020 places. Four teams from League A which had not already qualified for the European Championship finals competed in the play-offs, which were played in October and November 2020. The play-off berths were first allocated to the group winners, and if any of the group winners had already qualified for the European Championship finals, then to the next best ranked team of the league, etc. If there were fewer than four teams in League A which had not already qualified for the European Championship finals, the play-off berths would be allocated to the next best ranked team of the following league, etc. The play-offs consisted of two "one-off" semi-finals (best-ranked team vs. fourth best-ranked team and second best-ranked team vs. third best-ranked team, played at home of higher-ranked teams) and one "one-off" final between the two semi-final winners (venue drawn in advance between semi-final 1 and 2).

=== Seeding ===
Teams were allocated to League A according to their UEFA national team coefficients after the conclusion of the 2018 FIFA World Cup qualifying group stage on 11 October 2017. Teams were split into three pots of four teams, ordered based on their UEFA national team coefficient. The seeding pots for the draw were announced on 7 December 2017.

Pot 1
Team	Coeff	Rank
Germany	40,747	1
Portugal	38,655	2
Belgium	38,123	3
Spain	37,311	4

Pot 2
Team	Coeff	Rank
France	36,617	5
England	36,231	6
Switzerland	34,986	7
Italy	34,426	8

Pot 3
Team	Coeff	Rank
Poland	32,982	9
Iceland	31,155	10
Croatia	31,139	11
Netherlands	29,866	12

The group draw took place at the SwissTech Convention Center in Lausanne, Switzerland on 24 January 2018, 12:00 CET.

== Groups ==
The fixture list was confirmed by UEFA on 24 January 2018 following the draw.

Times are CET/CEST, (Note: CEST (UTC+2) for matchdays 1–4 (September and October 2018), CET (UTC+1) for matchdays 5–6 (November 2018).) as listed by UEFA (local times, if different, are in parentheses).

=== Group 1 ===
Pos	Team	Pld	W	D	L	GF	GA	GD	Pts	Qualification (Note: Due to revamp of the format for the 2020–21 UEFA Nations League, no teams were eventually relegated.)	(Netherlands)	(France)	(Germany)
1	Netherlands	4	2	1	1	8	4	+4	7 (Note: Head-to-head goal difference: Netherlands +1, France −1.)	Qualification for Nations League Finals	—	2–0	3–0
2	France	4	2	1	1	4	4	0	7		2–1	—	2–1
3	Germany	4	0	2	2	3	7	−4	2		2–2	0–0	—

Source: UEFA
Rules for classification: Tiebreakers
Notes:
6 September 2018
20:45

Germany	0–0	France
	Report

Allianz Arena, Munich
Attendance: 67,485
Referee: Daniele Orsato (Italy)

9 September 2018
20:45

France	2–1	Netherlands
Mbappé 14'; Giroud 75'	Report	Babel 67'

Stade de France, Saint-Denis
Attendance: 76,452
Referee: Alberto Undiano Mallenco (Spain)

13 October 2018
20:45

Netherlands	3–0	Germany
Van Dijk 30'; Depay 87'; Wijnaldum 90+3'	Report

Johan Cruyff Arena, Amsterdam
Attendance: 52,536
Referee: Cüneyt Çakır (Turkey)

16 October 2018
20:45

France	2–1	Germany
Griezmann 62', 80' (pen.)	Report	Kroos 14' (pen.)

Stade de France, Saint-Denis
Attendance: 77,300
Referee: Milorad Mažić (Serbia)

16 November 2018
20:45

Netherlands	2–0	France
Wijnaldum 44'; Depay 90+6' (pen.)	Report

De Kuip, Rotterdam
Attendance: 44,366
Referee: Anthony Taylor (England)

19 November 2018
20:45

Germany	2–2	Netherlands
Werner 9'; Sané 20'	Report	Promes 85'; Van Dijk 90+1'

Veltins-Arena, Gelsenkirchen
Attendance: 42,186
Referee: Ovidiu Hațegan (Romania)

=== Group 2 ===
Pos	Team	Pld	W	D	L	GF	GA	GD	Pts	Qualification (Note: Due to revamp of the format for the 2020–21 UEFA Nations League, no teams were eventually relegated.)	(Switzerland)	(Belgium)	(Iceland)
1	Switzerland	4	3	0	1	14	5	+9	9 (Note: Head-to-head goal difference: Switzerland +2, Belgium −2.)	Qualification for Nations League Finals	—	5–2	6–0
2	Belgium	4	3	0	1	9	6	+3	9		2–1	—	2–0
3	Iceland	4	0	0	4	1	13	−12	0		1–2	0–3	—

Source: UEFA
Rules for classification: Tiebreakers
Notes:
8 September 2018
18:00

Switzerland	6–0	Iceland
Zuber 13'; Zakaria 23'; Shaqiri 53'; Seferovic 67'; Ajeti 71'; Mehmedi 82'	Report

Kybunpark, St. Gallen
Attendance: 14,912
Referee: Michael Oliver (England)

11 September 2018
20:45 (18:45 UTC+0)

Iceland	0–3	Belgium
	Report	E. Hazard 29' (pen.); Lukaku 31', 81'

Laugardalsvöllur, Reykjavík
Attendance: 9,710
Referee: Sergei Karasev (Russia)

12 October 2018
20:45

Belgium	2–1	Switzerland
Lukaku 58', 84'	Report	Gavranović 76'

King Baudouin Stadium, Brussels
Attendance: 39,049
Referee: Antonio Mateu Lahoz (Spain)

15 October 2018
20:45 (18:45 UTC+0)

Iceland	1–2	Switzerland
Finnbogason 81'	Report	Seferovic 52'; Lang 67'

Laugardalsvöllur, Reykjavík
Attendance: 8,663
Referee: Andreas Ekberg (Sweden)

15 November 2018
20:45

Belgium	2–0	Iceland
Batshuayi 65', 81'	Report

King Baudouin Stadium, Brussels
Attendance: 28,891
Referee: Orel Grinfeld (Israel)

18 November 2018
20:45

Switzerland	5–2	Belgium
Rodriguez 26' (pen.); Seferovic 31', 44', 84'; Elvedi 62'	Report	T. Hazard 2', 17'

Swissporarena, Lucerne
Attendance: 15,000
Referee: Daniele Orsato (Italy)

=== Group 3 ===
Pos	Team	Pld	W	D	L	GF	GA	GD	Pts	Qualification (Note: Due to revamp of the format for the 2020–21 UEFA Nations League, no teams were eventually relegated.)	(Portugal)	(Italy)	(Poland)
1	Portugal	4	2	2	0	5	3	+2	8	Qualification for Nations League Finals	—	1–0	1–1
2	Italy	4	1	2	1	2	2	0	5		0–0	—	1–1
3	Poland	4	0	2	2	4	6	−2	2		2–3	0–1	—

Source: UEFA
Rules for classification: Tiebreakers
Notes:
7 September 2018
20:45

Italy	1–1	Poland
Jorginho 78' (pen.)	Report	Zieliński 40'

Stadio Renato Dall'Ara, Bologna
Attendance: 24,000
Referee: Felix Zwayer (Germany)

10 September 2018
20:45 (19:45 UTC+1)

Portugal	1–0	Italy
A. Silva 48'	Report

Estádio da Luz, Lisbon
Attendance: 52,635
Referee: Willie Collum (Scotland)

11 October 2018
20:45

Poland	2–3	Portugal
Piątek 18'; Błaszczykowski 77'	Report	A. Silva 32'; Glik 43' (o.g.); B. Silva 52'

Stadion Śląski, Chorzów
Attendance: 48,783
Referee: Carlos del Cerro Grande (Spain)

14 October 2018
20:45

Poland	0–1	Italy
	Report	Biraghi 90+2'

Stadion Śląski, Chorzów
Attendance: 41,692
Referee: Damir Skomina (Slovenia)

17 November 2018
20:45

Italy	0–0	Portugal
	Report

San Siro, Milan
Attendance: 73,000
Referee: Danny Makkelie (Netherlands)

20 November 2018
20:45 (19:45 UTC+0)

Portugal	1–1	Poland
A. Silva 34'	Report	Milik 66' (pen.)

Estádio D. Afonso Henriques, Guimarães
Attendance: 29,917
Referee: Sergei Karasev (Russia)

=== Group 4 ===
Pos	Team	Pld	W	D	L	GF	GA	GD	Pts	Qualification (Note: Due to revamp of the format for the 2020–21 UEFA Nations League, no teams were eventually relegated.)	(England)	(Spain)	(Croatia)
1	England	4	2	1	1	6	5	+1	7	Qualification for Nations League Finals	—	1–2	2–1
2	Spain	4	2	0	2	12	7	+5	6		2–3	—	6–0
3	Croatia	4	1	1	2	4	10	−6	4		0–0	3–2	—

Source: UEFA
Rules for classification: Tiebreakers
Notes:
8 September 2018
20:45 (19:45 UTC+1)

England	1–2	Spain
Rashford 11'	Report	Saúl 13'; Rodrigo 32'

Wembley Stadium, London
Attendance: 81,392
Referee: Danny Makkelie (Netherlands)

11 September 2018
20:45

Spain	6–0	Croatia
Saúl 24'; Asensio 33'; Kalinić 35' (o.g.); Rodrigo 49'; Ramos 57'; Isco 70'	Report

Martínez Valero, Elche
Attendance: 26,900
Referee: Benoît Bastien (France)

12 October 2018
20:45

Croatia	0–0	England
	Report

Stadion Rujevica, Rijeka
Attendance: 0 (Note: The Croatia v England match was played behind closed doors due to a UEFA punishment against Croatia for racist fan behaviour in their UEFA Euro 2016 qualifying home match against Italy.)
Referee: Felix Brych (Germany)

15 October 2018
20:45

Spain	2–3	England
Alcácer 58'; Ramos 90+8'	Report	Sterling 16', 38'; Rashford 30'

Benito Villamarín, Seville
Attendance: 50,355
Referee: Szymon Marciniak (Poland)

15 November 2018
20:45

Croatia	3–2	Spain
Kramarić 54'; Jedvaj 69', 90+3'	Report	Ceballos 56'; Ramos 78' (pen.)

Stadion Maksimir, Zagreb
Attendance: 33,018
Referee: Aleksei Kulbakov (Belarus)

18 November 2018
15:00 (14:00 UTC+0)

England	2–1	Croatia
Lingard 78'; Kane 85'	Report	Kramarić 57'

Wembley Stadium, London
Attendance: 78,221
Referee: Anastasios Sidiropoulos (Greece)

== Nations League Finals ==
The host of the Nations League Finals, Portugal, was selected from the four qualified teams. The semi-finals pairings were determined by means of an open draw, along with the administrative home teams for the third place play-off and final. The draw took place on 3 December 2018, 14:30 CET (13:30 local time), at the Shelbourne Hotel in Dublin, Republic of Ireland. For scheduling purposes, the semi-final pairing involving the host team was considered to be semi-final 1.

Times are CEST (UTC+2), as listed by UEFA (local times are in parentheses).

=== Bracket ===
Semi-finals
5 June 2019 – Porto
Portugal	3
Switzerland	1
6 June 2019 – Guimarães
Netherlands (a.e.t.)	3
England	1

Final
9 June 2019 – Porto
Portugal	1
Netherlands	0
Third place play-off
9 June 2019 – Guimarães
Switzerland	0 (5)
England (p)	0 (6)

=== Semi-finals ===
5 June 2019
20:45 (19:45 UTC+1)

Portugal	3–1	Switzerland
Ronaldo 25', 88', 90'	Report	Rodriguez 57' (pen.)

Estádio do Dragão, Porto
Attendance: 42,415
Referee: Felix Brych (Germany)

6 June 2019
20:45 (19:45 UTC+1)

Netherlands	3–1 (a.e.t.)	England
De Ligt 73'; Walker 97' (o.g.); Promes 114'	Report	Rashford 32' (pen.)

Estádio D. Afonso Henriques, Guimarães
Attendance: 25,711
Referee: Clément Turpin (France)

=== Third-place play-off ===
9 June 2019
15:00 (14:00 UTC+1)

Switzerland	0–0 (a.e.t.)	England
	Report
Penalties
Zuber (penalty scored); Xhaka (penalty scored); Akanji (penalty scored); Mbabu (penalty scored); Schär (penalty scored); Drmić (penalty missed)	5–6	(penalty scored) Maguire; (penalty scored) Barkley; (penalty scored) Sancho; (penalty scored) Sterling; (penalty scored) Pickford; (penalty scored) Dier

Estádio D. Afonso Henriques, Guimarães
Attendance: 15,742
Referee: Ovidiu Hațegan (Romania)

=== Final ===
9 June 2019
20:45 (19:45 UTC+1)

Portugal	1–0	Netherlands
Guedes 60'	Report

Estádio do Dragão, Porto
Attendance: 43,199
Referee: Alberto Undiano Mallenco (Spain)

== Goalscorers ==
There were 81 goals scored in 28 matches, for an average of 2.89 goals per match.

5 goals

- (Switzerland) Haris Seferovic

4 goals

- (Belgium) Romelu Lukaku

3 goals

- (England) Marcus Rashford
- (Portugal) Cristiano Ronaldo
- (Portugal) André Silva
- (Spain) Sergio Ramos

2 goals

- (Belgium) Michy Batshuayi
- (Belgium) Thorgan Hazard
- (Croatia) Tin Jedvaj
- (Croatia) Andrej Kramarić
- (England) Raheem Sterling
- (France) Antoine Griezmann
- (Netherlands) Memphis Depay
- (Netherlands) Virgil van Dijk
- (Netherlands) Quincy Promes
- (Netherlands) Georginio Wijnaldum
- (Spain) Rodrigo
- (Spain) Saúl
- (Switzerland) Ricardo Rodriguez

1 goal

- (Belgium) Eden Hazard
- (England) Harry Kane
- (England) Jesse Lingard
- (France) Olivier Giroud
- (France) Kylian Mbappé
- (Germany) Toni Kroos
- (Germany) Leroy Sané
- (Germany) Timo Werner
- (Iceland) Alfreð Finnbogason
- (Italy) Cristiano Biraghi
- (Italy) Jorginho
- (Netherlands) Ryan Babel
- (Netherlands) Matthijs de Ligt
- (Poland) Jakub Błaszczykowski
- (Poland) Arkadiusz Milik
- (Poland) Krzysztof Piątek
- (Poland) Piotr Zieliński
- (Portugal) Gonçalo Guedes
- (Portugal) Bernardo Silva
- (Spain) Paco Alcácer
- (Spain) Marco Asensio
- (Spain) Dani Ceballos
- (Spain) Isco
- (Switzerland) Albian Ajeti
- (Switzerland) Nico Elvedi
- (Switzerland) Mario Gavranović
- (Switzerland) Michael Lang
- (Switzerland) Admir Mehmedi
- (Switzerland) Xherdan Shaqiri
- (Switzerland) Denis Zakaria
- (Switzerland) Steven Zuber

1 own goal

- (Croatia) Lovre Kalinić (against Spain)
- (England) Kyle Walker (against Netherlands)
- (Poland) Kamil Glik (against Portugal)

== Overall ranking ==
The 12 League A teams were ranked 1st to 12th overall in the 2018–19 UEFA Nations League according to the following rules:

- The teams finishing first in the groups were ranked 1st to 4th according to the results of the Nations League Finals.
- The teams finishing second in the groups were ranked 5th to 8th according to the results of the league phase.
- The teams finishing third in the groups were ranked 9th to 12th according to the results of the league phase.

Rnk	Grp	Team	Pld	W	D	L	GF	GA	GD	Pts
1	A3	Portugal	4	2	2	0	5	3	+2	8
2	A1	Netherlands	4	2	1	1	8	4	+4	7
3	A4	England	4	2	1	1	6	5	+1	7
4	A2	Switzerland	4	3	0	1	14	5	+9	9
5	A2	Belgium	4	3	0	1	9	6	+3	9
6	A1	France	4	2	1	1	4	4	0	7
7	A4	Spain	4	2	0	2	12	7	+5	6
8	A3	Italy	4	1	2	1	2	2	0	5
9	A4	Croatia	4	1	1	2	4	10	−6	4
10	A3	Poland	4	0	2	2	4	6	−2	2
11	A1	Germany	4	0	2	2	3	7	−4	2
12	A2	Iceland	4	0	0	4	1	13	−12	0

Source: UEFA
Rules for classification: Ranking criteria

== Prize money ==
The prize money to be distributed was announced in March 2018. Each team in League A received a solidarity fee of €1.5 million. In addition, the four group winners received double this amount via a €1.5M bonus fee.

The four group winners of League A, which participated in the Nations League Finals, also received the following fees based on performance:

- Winners: €4.5M
- Runners-up: €3.5M
- Third place: €2.5M
- Fourth place: €1.5M

This meant that the maximum amount of solidarity and bonus fees for a team from League A was €7.5M.

== Euro 2020 qualifying play-offs ==
The four best teams in League A according to the overall ranking that did not qualify for UEFA Euro 2020 through the qualifying group stage were set to compete in the play-offs, with the winners qualifying for the final tournament. As Iceland were the only team in League A that did not qualify, the remaining three slots were allocated to teams identified according to the path formation rules to be the three best-ranked un-qualified non-group winners from League C not drawn to Path C.

League A
Rank	Team
1 ^{GW}	Portugal
2 ^{GW}	Netherlands
3 ^{GW}	England
4 ^{GW}	Switzerland
5	Belgium
6	France
7	Spain
8	Italy
9	Croatia
10	Poland
11	Germany
12	Iceland

Key

1. ^{GW} Nations League group winner
2. ^{H} UEFA Euro 2020 host at the time of the draw
3. Team advanced to play-offs
4. Team qualified directly to final tournament
