= Rúben Dias =

Portuguese footballer (born 1997)

- Dias with Portugal in 2026

Personal information
- Full name: Rúben dos Santos Gato Alves Dias
- Date of birth: 14 May 1997 (age 29)
- Place of birth: Amadora, Lisbon, Portugal
- Height: 1.87 m (6 ft 2 in)
- Position: Centre-back

Team information
- Current team: Manchester City
- Number: 3

Youth career
- 2006–2008: Estrela da Amadora
- 2008–2015: Benfica

Senior career*
Years	Team	Apps	(Gls)
2015–2017	Benfica B	55	(0)
2017–2020	Benfica	91	(9)
2020–	Manchester City	175	(5)

International career^{‡}
2013	Portugal U16	5	(1)
2013–2014	Portugal U17	18	(0)
2014–2016	Portugal U19	21	(2)
2016–2017	Portugal U20	15	(0)
2017	Portugal U21	4	(0)
2018–	Portugal	85	(3)
Medal record
Men's football
Representing Portugal
UEFA Nations League
Winner	2019 Portugal
Winner	2025 Germany
- * Club domestic league appearances and goals as of 23:54, 20 September 2026 (UTC) ‡ National team caps and goals as of 22:22, 14 November 2026 (UTC)

Rúben dos Santos Gato Alves Dias (born 14 May 1997) is a Portuguese professional footballer who plays as a centre-back for Premier League club Manchester City, which he captains, and the Portugal national team.

Dias came through Benfica's youth academy. He began playing for Benfica B in 2015 and was promoted to the first-team in 2017, and was named the Primeira Liga's Young Player of the Year. The following season, Dias won the league title in the 2018–19 season with Benfica and later the Supertaça Cândido de Oliveira during the 2019–20 season, while also being named in the Primeira Liga's Team of the Year, making over 100 appearances in the process.

He signed for Premier League club Manchester City in September 2020 for a reported fee of €68 million, becoming the second-highest fee for a Portuguese player leaving the domestic league. Dias won the league title and EFL Cup in his first season, while also reaching the UEFA Champions League final. He was also named FWA Footballer of the Year, Manchester City Player of the Year, Premier League Player of the Season and the UEFA Champions League Defender of the Season in 2021. In 2022–23, he played a crucial role in defence as City secured a first-ever continental treble, their most successful season to date.

Dias is a former Portugal youth international, representing his country at under-16, under-17, under-19, under-20 and under-21 levels. He made his senior international debut in 2018, being chosen in Portugal's squads for three FIFA World Cups (2018, 2022 and 2026) and two UEFA European Championships (2020 and 2024); he also won the 2019 and 2025 UEFA Nations League Finals, being named in the 2019 team of the tournament on home soil and man of the match in the final.

== Early life ==
Rúben dos Santos Gato Alves Dias was born on 14 May 1997 in Amadora, Lisbon District. He has an older brother Ivan, who is also a professional football player, who nicknamed him "Ruby". Growing up, his idols were John Terry, Nemanja Vidić, Rio Ferdinand, and Vincent Kompany, whom he looked to emulate, as he aspired to play in the Premier League from an early age. He would play football wherever he could on the streets or in his house with his brother Ivan.

== Club career ==
=== Benfica B ===
Dias started his career at local club Estrela da Amadora after being brought to the club by a close family member. Dias initially played as a striker, before switching to defence, due to his team being losing by two goals during a match. He moved to Benfica's youth academy in 2008, where he played initially as a midfielder, before changing position to centre-back for the junior side until 2015. In the same year, on 30 September, he made his professional debut with Benfica B in a 2015–16 LigaPro match against Chaves. On 7 March 2016, Rui Vitória called 18-year-old Dias for Benfica's UEFA Champions League Round of 16-second leg tie against Zenit Saint Petersburg after three of his four main centre-backs were unable to make the trip to Russia. The following season he helped the B team finish fourth; the club's highest ever position obtained in the second division. He also helped the junior team reach the final of the 2016–17 UEFA Youth League.

=== Benfica ===
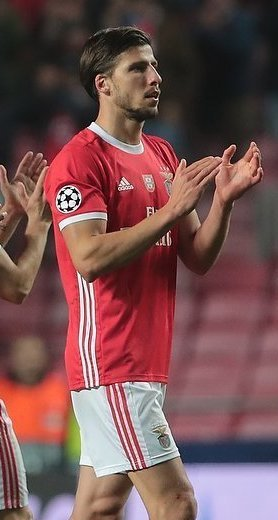
Dias playing for Benfica in 2019

On 16 September 2017, Dias debuted for the first team in a Primeira Liga match against Boavista. After two months of impressive displays, including two games against Manchester United in the Champions League, he underwent surgery due to appendicitis, sidelining him for a month. He scored his first goal for Benfica in a Taça da Liga encounter (2–2) against Vitória de Setúbal on 29 December 2017. On 3 February 2018, he scored his first goal in the Primeira Liga against Rio Ave (5–1). At the end of the season, he was voted Primeira Liga's best young player of the year.

After heavy speculation linking Dias to a big money move to French side Lyon, he extended his contract with Benfica until 2023. On 2 November 2019, Dias played his 100th game for the club and scored the opening goal against Rio Ave in a 2–0 home victory.

On 26 September 2020, Dias scored the opening goal against Moreirense in a 2–0 win. After the game, manager Jorge Jesus admitted that it had likely been his last game for the club.

=== Manchester City ===
==== 2020–2021: Debut season and European final ====
Dias signed for English Premier League club Manchester City on 29 September 2020 on a six-year contract, with an initial fee reported of €68 million (£61.64 million) that could rise to €71.6 million with performance bonuses, plus Nicolás Otamendi being sent to Benfica in part-exchange for €15 million bringing the net cost of the transaction to €56.6 million (£51 million). On 3 October 2020, Dias made his league debut for City in a 1–1 away draw against Leeds United.

Dias was named Manchester City Player of the Month for November 2020, following a series of very strong defensive performances. On 27 February 2021, Dias scored his first goal for City in a 2–1 home league win over West Ham United. He was praised as being a key factor in Manchester City regaining the Premier League title that season by bringing composure, leadership and stability back to the defence. Dias won the FWA Footballer of the Year for the 2020–21 season, who described him as a "comfortable winner" ahead of Harry Kane and Kevin De Bruyne, and becoming the first defender to win the award since Steve Nicol in the 1988–89 season. He was also named Manchester City's Player of the Season and the Premier League Player of the Season.

==== 2022–present: Consecutive league titles and Treble ====
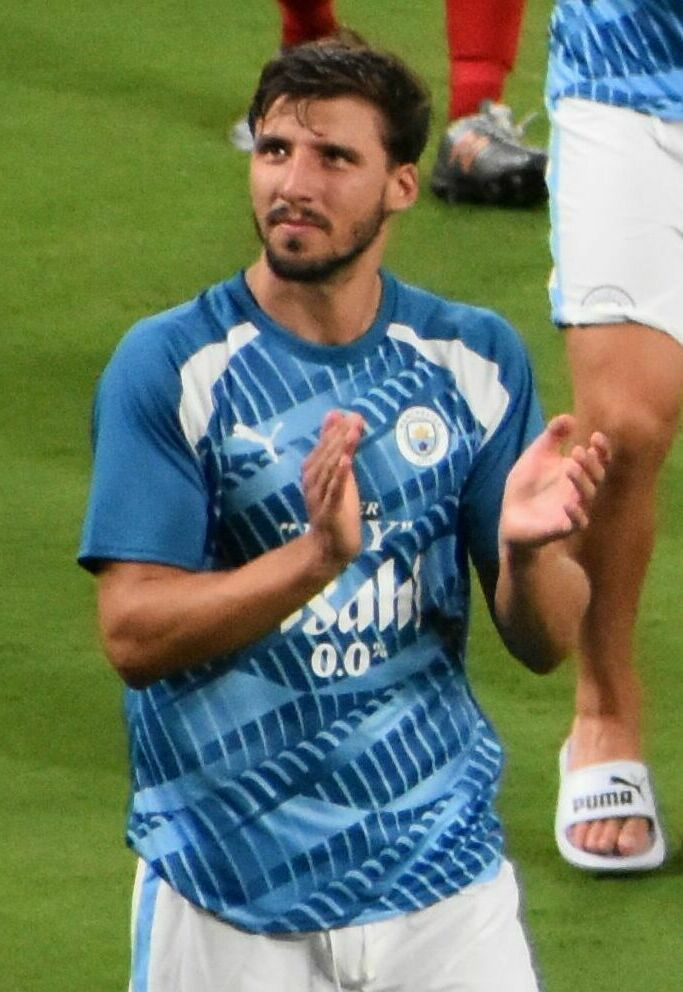
Dias with Manchester City in 2023

On 15 September 2021, Dias captained Manchester City for the first time, providing an assist for Jack Grealish in a 6–3 home Champions League win against RB Leipzig. On 1 December, Dias opened the scoring in Manchester City's 2–1 victory over Aston Villa, with his first goal from outside the box in his career.

On 4 March 2022, Manchester City manager Pep Guardiola announced that Dias had suffered an hamstring injury, his first injury in five years, leading him to miss two months of the season, which included the second Manchester Derby of the season, Manchester City's second leg of their Champions League round of 16 tie against Sporting CP and Portugal's qualification play-offs for the 2022 FIFA World Cup. He made his return from injury on 20 April, replacing Nathan Aké in the 46th minute in a 3–0 victory over Brighton & Hove Albion. On 7 May, Dias suffered another hamstring injury during a match against Newcastle United, sidelining him for the remainder of the season.

Over the course of the 2022–23 campaign, Dias started and completed almost every minute for Manchester City, playing a major part in their campaign, as City secured their first ever Champions League trophy and complete a continental treble, following a 1–0 victory against Inter Milan in the Champions League final.

On 22 August 2025, Dias signed a new four-year contract, keeping him at Manchester City until the summer of 2029.

== International career ==
=== 2013–2018: Youth level and first international tournament ===
Dias represented the Under-17 side at the 2014 UEFA European Under-17 Championship. Two years later, he served as captain to the under-19 squad at the 2016 UEFA European Under-19 Championship. The following year, Dias served as captain to the under-20 team at the 2017 U-20 World Cup, which lost to Uruguay 5–4 on penalties in the quarterfinals. On 5 September 2017, he made his debut for the Under-21 in a 2019 UEFA European Under-21 Championship qualification match against Wales.

Ahead of international friendly matches against Egypt and the Netherlands, Dias was called up to the senior side by Portugal coach Fernando Santos on 15 March 2018. However, four days later, he was dropped from the squad after picking up right ankle sprain. On 17 May 2018, Dias was named in Portugal's 23-man squad for the FIFA World Cup in Russia. Eleven days later, he made his international debut in a friendly match against Tunisia. Despite being present at the World Cup, he did not feature in any of Portugal's four matches in the competition.

=== 2018–2022: Nations League title and subsequent tournaments ===
Following the World Cup, Dias began establishing himself at centre-back, overtaking José Fonte's place alongside Pepe, featuring in all of Portugal's 2018–19 UEFA Nations League matches, helping Portugal reach the 2019 UEFA Nations League final on home soil. On 9 June, Portugal defeated the Netherlands 1–0 in the tournament's final, with Dias being named man of the match. For his performances throughout the competition, he was named in the "Team of the Tournament".

On 17 November 2020, Dias scored his first international goals during the 2020–21 UEFA Nations League, with a brace in a 3–2 victory against Croatia. He was selected in Portugal's squad for UEFA Euro 2020. On 19 June 2021, he scored an own goal in the 35th minute in a 4–2 loss to Germany at Euro 2020. He appeared in all of Portugal's matches, being eventually eliminated at the round of 16, following a 1–0 loss to Belgium.

=== 2022–present: Second Nations League title ===
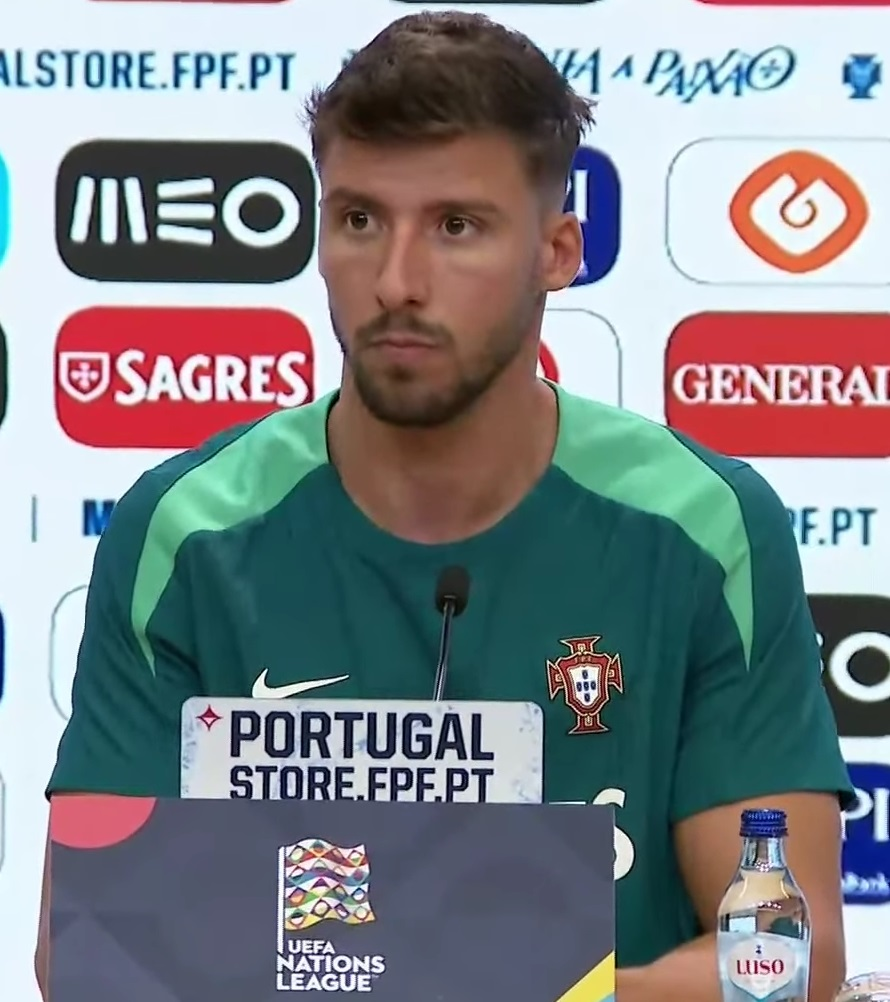
Dias during a press conference with Portugal in 2024

In October 2022, he was named in Portugal's preliminary 55-man squad for the 2022 FIFA World Cup in Qatar, before being included in the final 26-man squad for the tournament. He played almost every minute of their campaign, as they were knocked out of the tournament after losing 1–0 in the quarter-finals against Morocco.

On 11 September 2023, during a UEFA Euro 2024 qualifying match against Luxembourg at home, Dias earned his 50th cap, starting in Portugal's 9–0 victory, their biggest win in international history.

On 21 May 2024, Dias was named in Portugal's squad for UEFA Euro 2024 in Germany. He started in the team's first two matches against the Czech Republic and Turkey, before being rested for the final Group F match against Georgia. He was restored to the starting line-up for Portugal's round of 16 match against Slovenia and played 117 minutes before being substituted for Rúben Neves as Portugal won 3–0 in a penalty shootout. Portugal were eliminated in the quarter-finals to France after losing 5–3 in another penalty shootout.

On 20 May 2025, Dias was selected for Portugal’s 2025 UEFA Nations League Finals squad. He and his team would go on to win the tournament 5–3 in a penalty shootout over rivals Spain.

On 19 May 2026, Dias was selected in the 26-man squad for the 2026 FIFA World Cup.

== Player profile ==
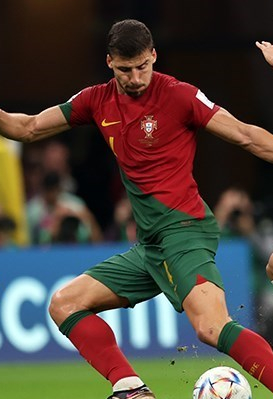
Dias at the 2022 FIFA World Cup

=== Style of play ===
Dias is a physically strong, right-footed centre-back who usually features on the left-hand side of central defence, due to his comfort in passing the ball with both feet. He is able to pass in different directions, whether to a teammate on the same side, switching to the opposite side, or making vertical line-breaking passes. Combining his two-footedness with a very good passing range, Dias can dictate play in any direction from the back.

His strength on the ball when shielding it away from forwards running down his channel. Dias is very calm on the ball too and rarely finds himself in a heap of pressure. Dias is extremely proficient at passing, especially in longer passes, as his passing quality and ability is able to help his team retain possession.

Dias is also dominant in the air, winning most of his aerial duels, as he looks to target his teammates and find them on a regular basis. He also uses his size to help him contest well in tackles, as he is also great at bodying up on players to win the ball back. He has a good-timing as he is able to anticipate a player's action or react for a "last-ditch" challenge.

=== Reception ===
His Manchester City manager Pep Guardiola, stated that "Dias a center back who leads the defensive line and in doing so helps others to make good decisions, the same happens in relation to midfielders [...] he is a player capable of living every moment of the game [...] always being focused on what he has to do and he makes his partner better." José Mourinho would praise Dias as the "best centre-back in world [...] for the Premier League, [he's] gaining another level of experience, knowledge".

Former Manchester United defender Gary Neville, stated that "Dias is the type of player who makes the whole team feel safe." Meanwhile, former Liverpool defender Jamie Carragher would compare Dias to legendary Barcelona defender Carles Puyol, stating that "the amount of interceptions" during a UEFA Champions League match reminded him of legendary Premier League defender John Terry, while also praising his "leadership skills".

== Personal life ==
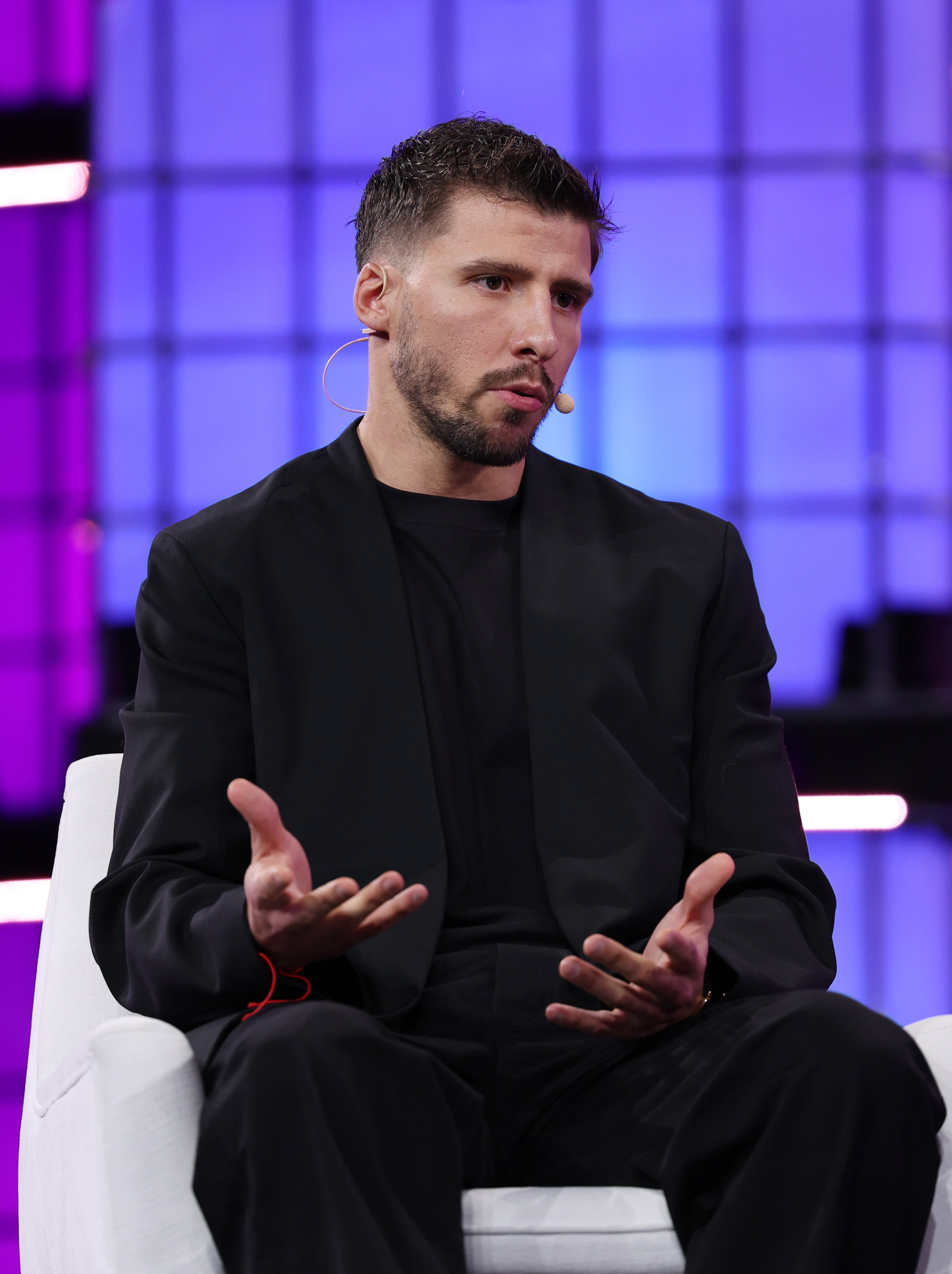
Dias in 2024

Dias was in a relationship with Portuguese singer April Ivy from 2018 to 2021. In March 2025, Gary Lineker mentioned in an online video that Dias was now dating British television presenter Maya Jama. Dias confirmed their separation in May 2026.

== Career statistics ==
=== Club ===
As of match played 20 September 2026

Appearances and goals by club, season and competition
Club	Season	League			National cup (Note: Includes Taça de Portugal, FA Cup)		League cup (Note: Includes Taça da Liga, EFL Cup)		Europe		Other		Total	
Club	Season	Division	Apps	Goals	Apps	Goals	Apps	Goals	Apps	Goals	Apps	Goals	Apps	Goals
Benfica B	2015–16	LigaPro	26	0	—		—		—		—		26	0
Benfica B	2016–17	LigaPro	28	0	—		—		—		—		28	0
Benfica B	2017–18	LigaPro	1	0	—		—		—		—		1	0
Benfica B	Total		55	0	—		—		—		—		55	0
Benfica	2017–18	Primeira Liga	24	3	1	0	3	1	2 (Note: Appearance(s) in UEFA Champions League)	0	0	0	30	4
Benfica	2018–19	Primeira Liga	32	3	5	0	3	0	15 (Note: Nine appearances in UEFA Champions League, six appearances and one goal in UEFA Europa League)	1	—		55	4
Benfica	2019–20	Primeira Liga	33	2	5	0	2	0	8 (Note: Six appearances in UEFA Champions League, two appearances and one goal in UEFA Europa League)	1	1 (Note: Appearance in Supertaça Cândido de Oliveira)	0	49	3
Benfica	2020–21	Primeira Liga	2	1	—		—		1	0	—		3	1
Benfica	Total		91	9	11	0	8	1	26	2	1	0	137	12
Manchester City	2020–21	Premier League	32	1	4	0	3	0	11	0	—		50	1
Manchester City	2021–22	Premier League	29	2	2	0	0	0	8	0	1 (Note: Appearance in FA Community Shield)	0	40	2
Manchester City	2022–23	Premier League	26	0	3	0	1	0	12	1	1	0	43	1
Manchester City	2023–24	Premier League	30	0	4	0	0	0	9	0	2 (Note: One appearance in FA Community Shield, one appearance in FIFA Club World Cup)	0	45	0
Manchester City	2024–25	Premier League	27	0	5	0	1	0	7	0	4 (Note: One appearance in FA Community Shield, three appearances in FIFA Club World Cup)	0	44	0
Manchester City	2025–26	Premier League	26	2	0	0	0	0	7	0	—		33	2
Manchester City	2026–27	Premier League	5	0	0	0	0	0	1	0	1	0	7	0
Manchester City	Total		175	5	18	0	5	0	55	1	9	0	262	6
Career total			321	14	29	0	13	1	81	3	10	0	454	18

=== International ===
As of match played 14 November 2026

Appearances and goals by national team and year
National team	Year	Apps	Goals
Portugal	2018	7	0
Portugal	2019	10	0
Portugal	2020	7	2
Portugal	2021	13	0
Portugal	2022	7	0
Portugal	2023	9	0
Portugal	2024	11	1
Portugal	2025	10	0
Portugal	2026	11	0
Total		85	3

As of match played 24 September 2026
Portugal score listed first, score column indicates score after each Dias goal

List of international goals scored by Rúben Dias
No.	Date	Venue	Cap	Opponent	Score	Result	Competition	Ref.
1	17 November 2020	Stadion Poljud, Split, Croatia	24	Croatia	1–1	3–2	2020–21 UEFA Nations League A	
2	17 November 2020	Stadion Poljud, Split, Croatia	24	Croatia	3–2	3–2	2020–21 UEFA Nations League A	
3	4 June 2024	Estádio José Alvalade, Lisbon, Portugal	55	Finland	1–0	4–2	Friendly	

== Honours ==
Benfica

- Primeira Liga: 2018–19
- Supertaça Cândido de Oliveira: 2019

Manchester City

- Premier League: 2020–21, 2021–22, 2022–23, 2023–24
- FA Cup: 2022–23, 2025–26; runner-up: 2023–24, 2024–25
- EFL Cup: 2020–21
- FA Community Shield: 2024
- UEFA Champions League: 2022–23; runner-up: 2020–21
- UEFA Super Cup: 2023
- FIFA Club World Cup: 2023

Portugal

- UEFA Nations League: 2018–19, 2024–25

Individual

- UEFA European Under-19 Championship Team of the Tournament: 2016
- Cosme Damião Awards – Revelation of the Year: 2017
- Primeira Liga Best Young Player of the Year: 2017–18
- UEFA Nations League Finals Team of the Tournament: 2019
- Primeira Liga Defender of the Month: March 2018, October/November 2019
- Primeira Liga Team of the Year: 2019–20
- FWA Footballer of the Year: 2020–21
- PFA Team of the Year: 2020–21 Premier League, 2022–23 Premier League
- Manchester City Player of the Year: 2020–21
- UEFA Champions League Squad/Team of the Season: 2020–21, 2022–23
- Premier League Player of the Season: 2020–21
- ESM Team of the Year: 2020–21
- UEFA Champions League Defender of the Season: 2020–21
- FIFPRO World 11: 2021, 2023
- FIFA Men's World 11: 2024
- IFFHS Men's World Team: 2021, 2023, 2024
- IFFHS Men's World Youth (U20) Team: 2020
