= 2018–19 UEFA Nations League C =

Tournament details
- Dates: 6 September – 20 November 2018
- Teams: 15
- Promoted: Bulgaria; Finland; Hungary; Israel; Norway; Romania; Scotland; Serbia

Tournament statistics
- Matches played: 42
- Goals scored: 92 (2.19 per match)
- Attendance: 338,393 (8,057 per match)
- Top scorer: (Serbia) Aleksandar Mitrović (6 goals)

The 2018–19 UEFA Nations League C was the third division of the 2018–19 edition of the UEFA Nations League, the inaugural season of the international football competition involving the men's national teams of the 55 member associations of UEFA.

== Format ==
League C consisted of 15 UEFA members ranked from 25 to 39, which were split into four groups (one group of three and three groups of four). The top two teams of each group were promoted to the 2020–21 UEFA Nations League B, and the bottom four ranked teams were initially relegated to the 2020–21 UEFA Nations League D (the bottom teams of Group 2, 3, and 4, along with the lowest ranked third-placed team of League C). However, following UEFA announcement of format changes for the next edition's groups in September 2019, none of the 2018–19 League C teams were relegated to League D.

In addition, League C was allocated one of the four remaining UEFA Euro 2020 places. The play-off berths were first allocated to each Nations League group winner, and if any of the group winners had already qualified for the European Championship finals, then to the next best-ranked team of the league, etc. As Finland already qualified for the European Championship finals through regular qualifiers and 11 teams in League A did the same, the seven best-ranked teams from League C competed in the play-offs, played in October and November 2020.

=== Seeding ===
Teams were allocated to League C according to their UEFA national team coefficients after the conclusion of the 2018 FIFA World Cup qualifying group stage on 11 October 2017. Teams were split into four pots (three pots of four teams and one pot of the three lowest teams), ordered based on their UEFA national team coefficient. The group with three teams contained teams only from pots 1, 2, and 3. The seeding pots for the draw were announced on 7 December 2017.

Pot 1
Team	Coeff	Rank
Hungary	26,486	25
Romania	26,057	26
Scotland	25,662	27
Slovenia	25,148	28

Pot 2
Team	Coeff	Rank
Greece	24,931	29
Serbia	24,847	30
Albania	24,430	31
Norway	24,208	32

Pot 3
Team	Coeff	Rank
Montenegro	23,912	33
Israel	22,792	34
Bulgaria	22,091	35
Finland	20,501	36

Pot 4
Team	Coeff	Rank
Cyprus	19,491	37
Estonia	19,441	38
Lithuania	18,101	39

The group draw took place at the SwissTech Convention Center in Lausanne, Switzerland on 24 January 2018, 12:00 CET. Due to winter venue restrictions, a group could only contain a maximum of two of the following teams: Norway, Finland, Estonia, Lithuania.

== Groups ==
The fixture list was confirmed by UEFA on 24 January 2018 following the draw.

Times are CET/CEST, (Note: CEST (UTC+2) for matchdays 1–4 (September and October 2018), CET (UTC+1) for matchdays 5–6 (November 2018).) as listed by UEFA (local times, if different, are in parentheses).

=== Group 1 ===
Pos	Team	Pld	W	D	L	GF	GA	GD	Pts	Promotion (Note: Due to revamp of the format for the 2020–21 UEFA Nations League, no teams were eventually relegated, and the second-placed teams in each group were also promoted.)	(Scotland)	(Israel)	(Albania)
1	Scotland (P)	4	3	0	1	10	4	+6	9	Promotion to League B	—	3–2	2–0
2	Israel (P)	4	2	0	2	6	5	+1	6	Promotion to League B	2–1	—	2–0
3	Albania	4	1	0	3	1	8	−7	3		0–4	1–0	—

Source: UEFA
Rules for classification: Tiebreakers
(P) Promoted
Notes:
7 September 2018
20:45

Albania	1–0	Israel
Xhaka 55'	Report

Elbasan Arena, Elbasan
Attendance: 4,126
Referee: Viktor Kassai (Hungary)

10 September 2018
20:45 (19:45 UTC+1)

Scotland	2–0	Albania
Djimsiti 47' (o.g.); Naismith 68'	Report

Hampden Park, Glasgow
Attendance: 17,455
Referee: Matej Jug (Slovenia)

11 October 2018
20:45 (21:45 UTC+3)

Israel	2–1	Scotland
Peretz 52'; Tierney 75' (o.g.)	Report	Mulgrew 25' (pen.)

Sammy Ofer Stadium, Haifa
Attendance: 10,234
Referee: Daniel Stefański (Poland)

14 October 2018
20:45 (21:45 UTC+3)

Israel	2–0	Albania
Hemed 8'; Saba 83'	Report

Turner Stadium, Be'er Sheva
Attendance: 14,950
Referee: Paolo Mazzoleni (Italy)

17 November 2018
20:45

Albania	0–4	Scotland
	Report	Fraser 14'; Fletcher 45+2' (pen.); Forrest 55', 67'

Loro Boriçi Stadium, Shkodër
Attendance: 8,632
Referee: Vladislav Bezborodov (Russia)

20 November 2018
20:45 (19:45 UTC+0)

Scotland	3–2	Israel
Forrest 34', 43', 64'	Report	Kayal 9'; Zahavi 75'

Hampden Park, Glasgow
Attendance: 21,281
Referee: Tobias Welz (Germany)

=== Group 2 ===
Pos	Team	Pld	W	D	L	GF	GA	GD	Pts	Promotion (Note: Due to revamp of the format for the 2020–21 UEFA Nations League, no teams were eventually relegated, and the second-placed teams in each group were also promoted.)	(Finland)	(Hungary)	(Greece)	(Estonia)
1	Finland (P)	6	4	0	2	5	3	+2	12	Promotion to League B	—	1–0	2–0	1–0
2	Hungary (P)	6	3	1	2	9	6	+3	10	Promotion to League B	2–0	—	2–1	2–0
3	Greece	6	3	0	3	4	5	−1	9		1–0	1–0	—	0–1
4	Estonia	6	1	1	4	4	8	−4	4		0–1	3–3	0–1	—

Source: UEFA
Rules for classification: Tiebreakers
(P) Promoted
Notes:
8 September 2018
18:00 (19:00 UTC+3)

Finland	1–0	Hungary
Pukki 7'	Report

Tampere Stadium, Tampere
Attendance: 10,220
Referee: Gediminas Mažeika (Lithuania)
8 September 2018
20:45 (21:45 UTC+3)

Estonia	0–1	Greece
	Report	Fortounis 14'

A. Le Coq Arena, Tallinn
Attendance: 5,567
Referee: Serdar Gözübüyük (Netherlands)

11 September 2018
20:45

Hungary	2–1	Greece
Sallai 15'; Kleinheisler 43'	Report	Manolas 18'

Groupama Arena, Budapest
Attendance: 120 (Note: The Hungary v Greece match was played behind closed doors due to a UEFA punishment against Hungary for racist behaviour in their UEFA Euro 2016 qualifying home match against Romania.)
Referee: Aleksei Kulbakov (Belarus)
11 September 2018
20:45 (21:45 UTC+3)

Finland	1–0	Estonia
Pukki 12'	Report

Veritas Stadion, Turku
Attendance: 4,632
Referee: Orel Grinfeld (Israel)

12 October 2018
20:45 (21:45 UTC+3)

Greece	1–0	Hungary
Mitroglou 65'	Report

Olympic Stadium, Athens
Attendance: 9,040
Referee: Tobias Stieler (Germany)
12 October 2018
20:45 (21:45 UTC+3)

Estonia	0–1	Finland
	Report	Pukki 90+1'

A. Le Coq Arena, Tallinn
Attendance: 8,087
Referee: Craig Pawson (England)

15 October 2018
20:45 (21:45 UTC+3)

Estonia	3–3	Hungary
Luts 20'; Pátkai 70' (o.g.); Anier 79'	Report	D. Nagy 24'; Szalai 54', 81'

A. Le Coq Arena, Tallinn
Attendance: 3,043
Referee: Halis Özkahya (Turkey)
15 October 2018
20:45 (21:45 UTC+3)

Finland	2–0	Greece
Soiri 46'; Kamara 89'	Report

Tampere Stadium, Tampere
Attendance: 10,107
Referee: Paweł Gil (Poland)

15 November 2018
20:45

Hungary	2–0	Estonia
Orbán 8'; Szalai 69'	Report

Groupama Arena, Budapest
Attendance: 7,775
Referee: Enea Jorgji (Albania)
15 November 2018
20:45 (21:45 UTC+2)

Greece	1–0	Finland
Granlund 25' (o.g.)	Report

Olympic Stadium, Athens
Attendance: 6,376
Referee: Luca Banti (Italy)

18 November 2018
20:45

Hungary	2–0	Finland
Szalai 29'; Á. Nagy 37'	Report

Groupama Arena, Budapest
Attendance: 9,200
Referee: Slavko Vinčić (Slovenia)
18 November 2018
20:45 (21:45 UTC+2)

Greece	0–1	Estonia
	Report	Lambropoulos 44' (o.g.)

Olympic Stadium, Athens
Attendance: 5,179
Referee: Yevhen Aranovskyi (Ukraine)

=== Group 3 ===
Pos	Team	Pld	W	D	L	GF	GA	GD	Pts	Promotion (Note: Due to revamp of the format for the 2020–21 UEFA Nations League, no teams were eventually relegated, and the second-placed teams in each group were also promoted.)	(Norway)	(Bulgaria)	(Cyprus)	(Slovenia)
1	Norway (P)	6	4	1	1	7	2	+5	13	Promotion to League B	—	1–0	2–0	1–0
2	Bulgaria (P)	6	3	2	1	7	5	+2	11	Promotion to League B	1–0	—	2–1	1–1
3	Cyprus	6	1	2	3	5	9	−4	5		0–2	1–1	—	2–1
4	Slovenia	6	0	3	3	5	8	−3	3		1–1	1–2	1–1	—

Source: UEFA
Rules for classification: Tiebreakers
(P) Promoted
Notes:
6 September 2018
20:45

Slovenia	1–2	Bulgaria
Zajc 40'	Report	Kraev 3', 59'

Stožice Stadium, Ljubljana
Attendance: 5,100
Referee: Davide Massa (Italy)
6 September 2018
20:45

Norway	2–0	Cyprus
Johansen 21', 42'	Report

Ullevaal Stadion, Oslo
Attendance: 6,172
Referee: István Kovács (Romania)

9 September 2018
18:00 (19:00 UTC+3)

Bulgaria	1–0	Norway
Vasilev 59'	Report

Vasil Levski National Stadium, Sofia
Attendance: 7,100
Referee: Daniel Stefański (Poland)
9 September 2018
20:45 (21:45 UTC+3)

Cyprus	2–1	Slovenia
Sotiriou 69'; Stojanović 89' (o.g.)	Report	Berić 54'

GSP Stadium, Nicosia
Attendance: 1,115
Referee: Andris Treimanis (Latvia)

13 October 2018
18:00

Norway	1–0	Slovenia
Selnæs 45+5'	Report

Ullevaal Stadion, Oslo
Attendance: 14,712
Referee: Daniel Siebert (Germany)
13 October 2018
20:45 (21:45 UTC+3)

Bulgaria	2–1	Cyprus
Despodov 59'; Nedelev 68'	Report	Kastanos 41'

Vasil Levski National Stadium, Sofia
Attendance: 6,700
Referee: Srđan Jovanović (Serbia)

16 October 2018
20:45

Norway	1–0	Bulgaria
M. Elyounoussi 31'	Report

Ullevaal Stadion, Oslo
Attendance: 9,523
Referee: John Beaton (Scotland)
16 October 2018
20:45

Slovenia	1–1	Cyprus
Skubic 83'	Report	Papoulis 37'

Stožice Stadium, Ljubljana
Attendance: 5,318
Referee: Mads-Kristoffer Kristoffersen (Denmark)

16 November 2018
20:45 (21:45 UTC+2)

Cyprus	1–1	Bulgaria
Zachariou 24'	Report	Dimitrov 89' (pen.)

GSP Stadium, Nicosia
Attendance: 3,844
Referee: Mohammed Al-Hakim (Sweden)
16 November 2018
20:45

Slovenia	1–1	Norway
Verbič 9'	Report	Johnsen 85'

Stožice Stadium, Ljubljana
Attendance: 10,254
Referee: Ruddy Buquet (France)

19 November 2018
20:45 (21:45 UTC+2)

Bulgaria	1–1	Slovenia
Ivanov 68'	Report	Zajc 75'

Vasil Levski National Stadium, Sofia
Attendance: 3,092
Referee: Hüseyin Göçek (Turkey)
19 November 2018
20:45 (21:45 UTC+2)

Cyprus	0–2	Norway
	Report	Kamara 36', 48'

GSP Stadium, Nicosia
Attendance: 1,513
Referee: István Vad (Hungary)

=== Group 4 ===
Pos	Team	Pld	W	D	L	GF	GA	GD	Pts	Promotion (Note: Due to revamp of the format for the 2020–21 UEFA Nations League, no teams were eventually relegated, and the second-placed teams in each group were also promoted.)	(Serbia)	(Romania)	(Montenegro)	(Lithuania)
1	Serbia (P)	6	4	2	0	11	4	+7	14	Promotion to League B	—	2–2	2–1	4–1
2	Romania (P)	6	3	3	0	8	3	+5	12	Promotion to League B	0–0	—	0–0	3–0
3	Montenegro	6	2	1	3	7	6	+1	7		0–2	0–1	—	2–0
4	Lithuania	6	0	0	6	3	16	−13	0		0–1	1–2	1–4	—

Source: UEFA
Rules for classification: Tiebreakers
(P) Promoted
Notes:
7 September 2018
20:45 (21:45 UTC+3)

Lithuania	0–1	Serbia
	Report	Tadić 38' (pen.)

LFF Stadium, Vilnius
Attendance: 4,378
Referee: Bobby Madden (Scotland)
7 September 2018
20:45 (21:45 UTC+3)

Romania	0–0	Montenegro
	Report

Ilie Oană Stadium, Ploiești
Attendance: 0 (Note: The Romania v Montenegro match was played behind closed doors due to a UEFA punishment against Romania for racist behaviour in their UEFA Euro 2016 qualifying home match against Greece.)
Referee: Ivan Kružliak (Slovakia)

10 September 2018
20:45

Serbia	2–2	Romania
Mitrović 26', 63'	Report	Stanciu 48' (pen.); Țucudean 68'

Partizan Stadium, Belgrade
Attendance: 15,496
Referee: Vladislav Bezborodov (Russia)
10 September 2018
20:45

Montenegro	2–0	Lithuania
Savić 34' (pen.); Janković 35'	Report

City Stadium, Podgorica
Attendance: 5,239
Referee: Jakob Kehlet (Denmark)

11 October 2018
20:45 (21:45 UTC+3)

Lithuania	1–2	Romania
Žulpa 90'	Report	Chipciu 13'; Maxim 90+4'

LFF Stadium, Vilnius
Attendance: 2,279
Referee: François Letexier (France)
11 October 2018
20:45

Montenegro	0–2	Serbia
	Report	Mitrović 18' (pen.), 81'

City Stadium, Podgorica
Attendance: 9,394
Referee: Gianluca Rocchi (Italy)

14 October 2018
15:00 (16:00 UTC+3)

Romania	0–0	Serbia
	Report

Arena Națională, Bucharest
Attendance: 48,513
Referee: Kevin Blom (Netherlands)
14 October 2018
20:45 (21:45 UTC+3)

Lithuania	1–4	Montenegro
Baravykas 88'	Report	Mugoša 10', 45+1' (pen.); Kopitović 35'; Zorić 86'

LFF Stadium, Vilnius
Attendance: 1,515
Referee: Robert Schörgenhofer (Austria)

17 November 2018
15:00

Serbia	2–1	Montenegro
Ljajić 30'; Mitrović 32'	Report	Mugoša 70'

Red Star Stadium, Belgrade
Attendance: 15,416
Referee: Alberto Undiano Mallenco (Spain)
17 November 2018
20:45 (21:45 UTC+2)

Romania	3–0	Lithuania
Pușcaș 7'; Keșerü 47'; Stanciu 65'	Report

Ilie Oană Stadium, Ploiești
Attendance: 34 (Note: The Romania v Lithuania match was played behind closed doors due to a UEFA punishment against Romania for racist behaviour in their 2018–19 UEFA Nations League home match against Serbia.)
Referee: Marco Guida (Italy)

20 November 2018
20:45

Serbia	4–1	Lithuania
Žulpa 51' (o.g.); Mitrović 58'; Prijović 71'; Ljajić 74'	Report	Petravičius 64'

Partizan Stadium, Belgrade
Attendance: 2,088
Referee: Kristo Tohver (Estonia)
20 November 2018
20:45

Montenegro	0–1	Romania
	Report	Țucudean 44'

City Stadium, Podgorica
Attendance: 3,574
Referee: Felix Zwayer (Germany)

== Goalscorers ==
There were 92 goals scored in 42 matches, for an average of 2.19 goals per match.

6 goals

- (Serbia) Aleksandar Mitrović

5 goals

- (Scotland) James Forrest

4 goals

- (Hungary) Ádám Szalai

3 goals

- (Finland) Teemu Pukki
- (Montenegro) Stefan Mugoša

2 goals

- (Bulgaria) Bozhidar Kraev
- (Norway) Stefan Johansen
- (Norway) Ola Kamara
- (Romania) Nicolae Stanciu
- (Romania) George Țucudean
- (Serbia) Adem Ljajić
- (Slovenia) Miha Zajc

1 goal

- (Albania) Taulant Xhaka
- (Bulgaria) Kiril Despodov
- (Bulgaria) Nikolay Dimitrov
- (Bulgaria) Galin Ivanov
- (Bulgaria) Todor Nedelev
- (Bulgaria) Radoslav Vasilev
- (Cyprus) Grigoris Kastanos
- (Cyprus) Fotios Papoulis
- (Cyprus) Pieros Sotiriou
- (Cyprus) Panagiotis Zachariou
- (Estonia) Henri Anier
- (Estonia) Siim Luts
- (Finland) Glen Kamara
- (Finland) Pyry Soiri
- (Greece) Kostas Fortounis
- (Greece) Kostas Manolas
- (Greece) Kostas Mitroglou
- (Hungary) László Kleinheisler
- (Hungary) Ádám Nagy
- (Hungary) Dominik Nagy
- (Hungary) Willi Orbán
- (Hungary) Roland Sallai
- (Israel) Tomer Hemed
- (Israel) Beram Kayal
- (Israel) Dor Peretz
- (Israel) Dia Saba
- (Israel) Eran Zahavi
- (Lithuania) Rolandas Baravykas
- (Lithuania) Deimantas Petravičius
- (Lithuania) Artūras Žulpa
- (Montenegro) Marko Janković
- (Montenegro) Boris Kopitović
- (Montenegro) Stefan Savić
- (Montenegro) Darko Zorić
- (Norway) Mohamed Elyounoussi
- (Norway) Bjørn Maars Johnsen
- (Norway) Ole Selnæs
- (Romania) Alexandru Chipciu
- (Romania) Claudiu Keșerü
- (Romania) Alexandru Maxim
- (Romania) George Pușcaș
- (Scotland) Steven Fletcher
- (Scotland) Ryan Fraser
- (Scotland) Charlie Mulgrew
- (Scotland) Steven Naismith
- (Serbia) Aleksandar Prijović
- (Serbia) Dušan Tadić
- (Slovenia) Robert Berić
- (Slovenia) Nejc Skubic
- (Slovenia) Benjamin Verbič

1 own goal

- (Albania) Berat Djimsiti (against Scotland)
- (Finland) Albin Granlund (against Greece)
- (Greece) Vassilis Lambropoulos (against Estonia)
- (Hungary) Máté Pátkai (against Estonia)
- (Lithuania) Artūras Žulpa (against Serbia)
- (Scotland) Kieran Tierney (against Israel)
- (Slovenia) Petar Stojanović (against Cyprus)

== Overall ranking ==
The 15 League C teams were ranked 25th to 39th overall in the 2018–19 UEFA Nations League according to the following rules:

- The teams finishing first in the groups will be ranked 25th to 28th according to the results of the league phase, not considering results against the fourth-placed teams.
- The teams finishing second in the groups will be ranked 29th to 32nd according to the results of the league phase, not considering results against the fourth-placed teams.
- The teams finishing third in the groups will be ranked 33rd to 36th according to the results of the league phase, not considering results against the fourth-placed teams.
- The teams finishing fourth in the groups will be ranked 37th to 39th according to the results of the league phase, considering all results.

Rnk	Grp	Team	Pld	W	D	L	GF	GA	GD	Pts
25	C1	Scotland	4	3	0	1	10	4	+6	9
26	C3	Norway	4	3	0	1	5	1	+4	9
27	C4	Serbia	4	2	2	0	6	3	+3	8
28	C2	Finland	4	2	0	2	3	3	0	6
29	C3	Bulgaria	4	2	1	1	4	3	+1	7
30	C1	Israel	4	2	0	2	6	5	+1	6
31	C2	Hungary	4	2	0	2	4	3	+1	6
32	C4	Romania	4	1	3	0	3	2	+1	6
33	C2	Greece	4	2	0	2	3	4	−1	6
34	C1	Albania	4	1	0	3	1	8	−7	3
35	C4	Montenegro	4	0	1	3	1	5	−4	1
36	C3	Cyprus	4	0	1	3	2	7	−5	1
37	C2	Estonia	6	1	1	4	4	8	−4	4
38	C3	Slovenia	6	0	3	3	5	8	−3	3
39	C4	Lithuania	6	0	0	6	3	16	−13	0

Source: UEFA
Rules for classification: Ranking criteria

== Prize money ==
The prize money to be distributed was announced in March 2018. Each team in League C received a solidarity fee of €750,000. In addition, the four group winners received double this amount with a €750,000 bonus fee. This meant that the maximum amount of solidarity and bonus fees for a team from League C was €1.5 million.

== Euro 2020 qualifying play-offs ==
The seven best teams in League C according to the overall ranking that did not qualify for UEFA Euro 2020 through the qualifying group stage competed in the play-offs, with the winners qualifying for the final tournament.

League C
Rank	Team
25 ^{GW}	Scotland
26 ^{GW}	Norway
27 ^{GW}	Serbia
28 ^{GW}	Finland
29	Bulgaria
30	Israel
31	Hungary
32	Romania
33	Greece
34	Albania
35	Montenegro
36	Cyprus
37	Estonia
38	Slovenia
39	Lithuania

Key

1. ^{GW} Nations League group winner
2. ^{H} UEFA Euro 2020 host at the time of the draw
3. Team advanced to play-offs
4. Team qualified directly to final tournament
