= 2019 UEFA Nations League Finals =

Fase Final da Liga das Nações da UEFA de 2019 (in Portuguese)

Tournament details
- Host country: Portugal
- Dates: 5–9 June
- Teams: 4
- Venues: 2 (in 2 host cities)

Final positions
- Champions: Portugal (1st title)
- Runners-up: Netherlands
- Third place: England
- Fourth place: Switzerland

Tournament statistics
- Matches played: 4
- Goals scored: 9 (2.25 per match)
- Attendance: 127,067 (31,767 per match)
- Top scorer: (Portugal) Cristiano Ronaldo (3 goals)
- Best player: (Portugal) Bernardo Silva
- Best young player: (Netherlands) Frenkie de Jong

The 2019 UEFA Nations League Finals was the final tournament of the 2018–19 edition of the UEFA Nations League, the inaugural season of the international football competition involving the men's national teams of the 55 member associations of UEFA. The tournament was held in Portugal from 5 to 9 June 2019, and was contested by the four group winners of Nations League A. The tournament consisted of two semi-finals, a third place play-off, and final to determine the inaugural champions of the UEFA Nations League.

Portugal won the final 1–0 against the Netherlands to become the inaugural champions of the UEFA Nations League.

== Format ==
The Nations League Finals took place in June 2019 and was contested by the four group winners of League A. The four teams were each drawn into a five-team group (rather than a six-team group) for the UEFA Euro 2020 qualifying group stage, thereby leaving the June 2019 window available for the Nations League Finals.

The competition was played in a knockout format, consisting of two semi-finals, a third place play-off, and a final. The semi-final pairings, along with the administrative home teams for the third place play-off and final, were determined by means of an open draw on 3 December 2018.

The tournament took place over five days, with the first semi-final (which featured the host team) on 5 June, the second semi-final on 6 June, and the third place play-off and final on 9 June. The winners of the final were crowned as the inaugural champions of the UEFA Nations League.

The Nations League Finals were played in single-leg knockout matches. If the scores were level at the end of normal time, 30 minutes of extra time were played, where each team was allowed to make a fourth substitution. If the score was still level, the winner was determined by a penalty shoot-out. All matches in the tournament utilised the goal-line technology system. On 3 December, UEFA confirmed that the video assistant referee (VAR) system would be used for the Nations League Finals.

== Qualified teams ==
The four group winners of League A qualified for the Nations League Finals.

Group	Winners	Date of qualification	UNL Rankings November 2018	FIFA Rankings April 2019
A1	Netherlands	19 November 2018	3	16
A2	Switzerland	18 November 2018	1	8
A3	Portugal (host)	17 November 2018	2	7
A4	England	18 November 2018	4	4

== Host selection ==
Portugal was confirmed as the host country by the UEFA Executive Committee during their meeting on 3 December 2018 in Dublin, Ireland. Only League A teams could bid for the Nations League Finals, and only one of the four participants was selected as hosts. The Nations League Finals was held in two stadiums, each with a seating capacity of at least 30,000. Ideally, the stadiums would have been located in the same host city or up to approximately 150 kilometres (93 mi) apart.

On 9 March 2018, UEFA announced that Italy, Poland, and Portugal expressed interest in bidding prior to the deadline. The deadline to submit their dossiers was 31 August 2018. As all three associations formed Group A3, the group winner was in line to be appointed as the host, provided that the associations submitted bids that met UEFA's requirements. Poland were relegated from Group A3 on 14 October 2018, leaving Italy and Portugal as potential hosts. On 17 November 2018, Portugal won Group A3 and advanced to the Finals, thereby automatically winning hosting rights, which were confirmed by the UEFA Executive Committee on 3 December 2018, the same day as the Nations League Finals draw.

== Venues ==
In their bid dossier, the Portuguese Football Federation proposed Estádio do Dragão in Porto and Estádio D. Afonso Henriques in Guimarães as the venues. Both were previously used in UEFA Euro 2004.

2019 UEFA Nations League Finals is located in Portugal	Porto
2019 UEFA Nations League Finals is located in Portugal	Estádio do Dragão
2019 UEFA Nations League Finals is located in Portugal	Capacity: 50,033
2019 UEFA Nations League Finals is located in Portugal	Guimarães
2019 UEFA Nations League Finals is located in Portugal	Estádio D. Afonso Henriques
2019 UEFA Nations League Finals is located in Portugal	Capacity: 30,029

== Draw ==
The draw took place on 3 December 2018, 14:30 CET (13:30 local time), at the Shelbourne Hotel in Dublin, Ireland. No seeding was applied in the draw. The first two balls drawn were allocated as the administrative home teams for each semi-final pairing, with the next two balls drawn allocated as their opponents. For scheduling purposes, the semi-final pairing involving the host team was considered to be semi-final 1. The administrative home team for both the third place play-off and final were then jointly drawn between semi-final 1 and 2.

== Squads ==
Each national team had to submit a squad of 23 players, three of whom had to be goalkeepers, at least ten days before the opening match of the tournament. If a player became injured or ill severely enough to prevent his participation in the tournament before his team's first match, he was replaced by another player.

== Bracket ==
Semi-finals
5 June – Porto
Portugal	3
Switzerland	1
6 June – Guimarães
Netherlands (a.e.t.)	3
England	1

Final
9 June – Porto
Portugal	1
Netherlands	0
Third place play-off
9 June – Guimarães
Switzerland	0 (5)
England (p)	0 (6)

All times are local, WEST (UTC+1).

== Semi-finals ==
=== Portugal vs Switzerland ===
5 June 2019
19:45

Portugal	3–1	Switzerland
Ronaldo 25', 88', 90'	Report	Rodriguez 57' (pen.)

Estádio do Dragão, Porto
Attendance: 42,415
Referee: Felix Brych (Germany)

Portugal	Switzerland

GK	1	Rui Patrício
RB	20	Nélson Semedo
CB	3	Pepe	(substituted off) 63'
CB	4	Rúben Dias
LB	5	Raphaël Guerreiro
RM	16	Bruno Fernandes	(substituted off) 90+1'
CM	14	William Carvalho
CM	18	Rúben Neves
LM	10	Bernardo Silva
CF	23	João Félix	(substituted off) 70'
CF	7	Cristiano Ronaldo (c)
Substitutions:
DF	6	José Fonte	(substituted on) 63'
MF	17	Gonçalo Guedes	(substituted on) 70'
MF	8	João Moutinho	(substituted on) 90+1'
Manager:
Fernando Santos

GK	1	Yann Sommer
RB	2	Kevin Mbabu
CB	22	Fabian Schär	(yellow card) 68'
CB	5	Manuel Akanji
LB	13	Ricardo Rodriguez
RM	17	Denis Zakaria		(substituted off) 71'
CM	10	Granit Xhaka (c)	(yellow card) 66'
CM	8	Remo Freuler		(substituted off) 89'
LM	14	Steven Zuber		(substituted off) 83'
AM	23	Xherdan Shaqiri	(yellow card) 85'
CF	9	Haris Seferovic
Substitutions:
MF	20	Edimilson Fernandes		(substituted on) 71'
MF	11	Renato Steffen		(substituted on) 83'
FW	19	Josip Drmić		(substituted on) 89'
Manager:
Vladimir Petković

Man of the Match:
Cristiano Ronaldo (Portugal)

Assistant referees:
Mark Borsch (Germany)
Stefan Lupp (Germany)
Fourth official:
Viktor Kassai (Hungary)
Video assistant referee:
Christian Dingert (Germany)
Assistant video assistant referee:
Tobias Stieler (Germany)

=== Netherlands vs England ===
6 June 2019
19:45

Netherlands	3–1 (a.e.t.)	England
De Ligt 73'; Walker 97' (o.g.); Promes 114'	Report	Rashford 32' (pen.)

Estádio D. Afonso Henriques, Guimarães
Attendance: 25,711
Referee: Clément Turpin (France)

Netherlands	England

GK	1	Jasper Cillessen
RB	22	Denzel Dumfries	(yellow card) 45'
CB	3	Matthijs de Ligt	(yellow card) 30'
CB	4	Virgil van Dijk (c)
LB	17	Daley Blind
CM	15	Marten de Roon		(substituted off) 68'
CM	21	Frenkie de Jong		(substituted off) 114'
CM	8	Georginio Wijnaldum
RW	7	Steven Bergwijn		(substituted off) 91'
CF	10	Memphis Depay
LW	9	Ryan Babel		(substituted off) 68'
Substitutions:
FW	11	Quincy Promes		(substituted on) 68'
MF	20	Donny van de Beek	(yellow card) 106'	(substituted on) 68'
MF	6	Davy Pröpper		(substituted on) 91'
MF	16	Kevin Strootman		(substituted on) 114'
Manager:
Ronald Koeman

GK	1	Jordan Pickford
RB	2	Kyle Walker
CB	5	John Stones
CB	6	Harry Maguire
LB	14	Ben Chilwell
CM	16	Declan Rice		(substituted off) 106'
CM	17	Fabian Delph		(substituted off) 77'
CM	18	Ross Barkley
RW	11	Jadon Sancho		(substituted off) 61'
LW	10	Raheem Sterling (c)
CF	19	Marcus Rashford		(substituted off) 46'
Substitutions:
FW	9	Harry Kane	(yellow card) 70'	(substituted on) 46'
MF	7	Jesse Lingard		(substituted on) 61'
MF	8	Jordan Henderson		(substituted on) 77'
MF	20	Dele Alli		(substituted on) 106'
Manager:
Gareth Southgate

Man of the Match:
Frenkie de Jong (Netherlands)

Assistant referees:
Nicolas Danos (France)
Cyril Gringore (France)
Fourth official:
Anastasios Sidiropoulos (Greece)
Video assistant referee:
François Letexier (France)
Assistant video assistant referee:
Nicolas Rainville (France)

== Third place play-off ==
9 June 2019
14:00

Switzerland	0–0 (a.e.t.)	England
	Report
Penalties
Zuber (penalty scored); Xhaka (penalty scored); Akanji (penalty scored); Mbabu (penalty scored); Schär (penalty scored); Drmić (penalty missed)	5–6	(penalty scored) Maguire; (penalty scored) Barkley; (penalty scored) Sancho; (penalty scored) Sterling; (penalty scored) Pickford; (penalty scored) Dier

Estádio D. Afonso Henriques, Guimarães
Attendance: 15,742
Referee: Ovidiu Hațegan (Romania)

Switzerland	England

GK	1	Yann Sommer
CB	22	Fabian Schär
CB	5	Manuel Akanji
CB	4	Nico Elvedi
RM	2	Kevin Mbabu
CM	10	Granit Xhaka (c)	(yellow card) 116'
CM	8	Remo Freuler
LM	13	Ricardo Rodriguez		(substituted off) 87'
RW	23	Xherdan Shaqiri		(substituted off) 65'
LW	20	Edimilson Fernandes		(substituted off) 61'
CF	9	Haris Seferovic		(substituted off) 113'
Substitutions:
MF	17	Denis Zakaria		(substituted on) 61'
MF	14	Steven Zuber		(substituted on) 65'
FW	19	Josip Drmić		(substituted on) 87'
MF	7	Noah Okafor		(substituted on) 113'
Manager:
Vladimir Petković

GK	1	Jordan Pickford
RB	22	Trent Alexander-Arnold
CB	12	Joe Gomez
CB	6	Harry Maguire
LB	3	Danny Rose	(yellow card) 23'	(substituted off) 70'
CM	4	Eric Dier
CM	17	Fabian Delph		(substituted off) 106'
RW	7	Jesse Lingard	(yellow card) 27'	(substituted off) 106'
AM	20	Dele Alli
LW	10	Raheem Sterling
CF	9	Harry Kane (c)		(substituted off) 75'
Substitutions:
DF	2	Kyle Walker		(substituted on) 70'
FW	21	Callum Wilson		(substituted on) 75'
FW	11	Jadon Sancho		(substituted on) 106'
MF	18	Ross Barkley		(substituted on) 106'
Manager:
Gareth Southgate

Man of the Match:
Jordan Pickford (England)

Assistant referees:
Octavian Șovre (Romania)
Sebastian Gheorghe (Romania)
Fourth official:
Anastasios Sidiropoulos (Greece)
Video assistant referee:
Michael Fabbri (Italy)
Assistant video assistant referee:
Marco Di Bello (Italy)

== Final ==
9 June 2019
19:45

Portugal	1–0	Netherlands
Guedes 60'	Report

Estádio do Dragão, Porto
Attendance: 43,199
Referee: Alberto Undiano Mallenco (Spain)

Portugal	Netherlands

GK	1	Rui Patrício
RB	20	Nélson Semedo
CB	4	Rúben Dias
CB	6	José Fonte
LB	5	Raphaël Guerreiro
CM	13	Danilo Pereira
CM	14	William Carvalho	(substituted off) 90+3'
CM	16	Bruno Fernandes	(substituted off) 81'
RW	7	Cristiano Ronaldo (c)
CF	17	Gonçalo Guedes	(substituted off) 75'
LW	10	Bernardo Silva
Substitutions:
MF	15	Rafa Silva	(substituted on) 75'
MF	8	João Moutinho	(substituted on) 81'
MF	18	Rúben Neves	(substituted on) 90+3'
Manager:
Fernando Santos

GK	1	Jasper Cillessen
RB	22	Denzel Dumfries	(yellow card) 88'
CB	3	Matthijs de Ligt
CB	4	Virgil van Dijk (c)	(yellow card) 90+1'
LB	17	Daley Blind
CM	15	Marten de Roon		(substituted off) 81'
CM	21	Frenkie de Jong
CM	8	Georginio Wijnaldum
RW	7	Steven Bergwijn		(substituted off) 60'
CF	10	Memphis Depay
LW	9	Ryan Babel		(substituted off) 46'
Substitutions:
FW	11	Quincy Promes		(substituted on) 46'
MF	20	Donny van de Beek		(substituted on) 60'
FW	19	Luuk de Jong		(substituted on) 81'
Manager:
Ronald Koeman

Man of the Match:
Rúben Dias (Portugal)

Assistant referees:
Roberto Alonso Fernández (Spain)
Juan Yuste Jiménez (Spain)
Fourth official:
Antonio Mateu Lahoz (Spain)
Reserve assistant referee:
Raúl Cabañero Martínez (Spain)
Video assistant referee:
Alejandro Hernández Hernández (Spain)
Assistant video assistant referee:
Juan Martínez Munuera (Spain)

== Statistics ==
=== Goalscorers ===
There were 9 goals scored in 4 matches, for an average of 2.25 goals per match.

3 goals

- (Portugal) Cristiano Ronaldo

1 goal

- (England) Marcus Rashford
- (Netherlands) Matthijs de Ligt
- (Netherlands) Quincy Promes
- (Portugal) Gonçalo Guedes
- (Switzerland) Ricardo Rodríguez

1 own goal

- (England) Kyle Walker (against Netherlands)

Source: UEFA

=== Assists ===
2 assists

- (Netherlands) Memphis Depay
- (Portugal) Bernardo Silva

1 assist

- (Portugal) Gonçalo Guedes

Source: UEFA

=== Awards ===
Team of the Tournament

The Team of the Tournament was selected by UEFA's technical observers, and includes at least one player from each of the four participants.

Goalkeeper	Defenders	Midfielders	Forwards
(England) Jordan Pickford	(Netherlands) Daley Blind (Netherlands) Virgil van Dijk (Portugal) Rúben Dias (Portugal) Nélson Semedo	(Netherlands) Frenkie de Jong (Netherlands) Georginio Wijnaldum (Portugal) Bruno Fernandes	(Portugal) Cristiano Ronaldo (Portugal) Bernardo Silva (Switzerland) Xherdan Shaqiri

UEFA also announced a team of the tournament based on the FedEx Performance Zone player rankings.

FedEx Performance Zone Team of the Tournament
Goalkeeper	Defenders	Midfielders	Forwards
(England) Jordan Pickford	(Netherlands) Matthijs de Ligt (Portugal) Rúben Dias (Portugal) Raphaël Guerreiro (Switzerland) Manuel Akanji (Switzerland) Kevin Mbabu	(Netherlands) Frenkie de Jong (Netherlands) Marten de Roon (Portugal) Bernardo Silva	(Netherlands) Memphis Depay (Portugal) Cristiano Ronaldo

Player of the Tournament

The Player of the Tournament award was given to Bernardo Silva, who was chosen by UEFA's technical observers.

- (Portugal) Bernardo Silva

Young Player of the Tournament

The SOCAR Young Player of the Tournament award was open to players born on or after 1 January 1996. The award was given to Frenkie de Jong, as chosen by UEFA's technical observers.

- (Netherlands) Frenkie de Jong

Top Scorer

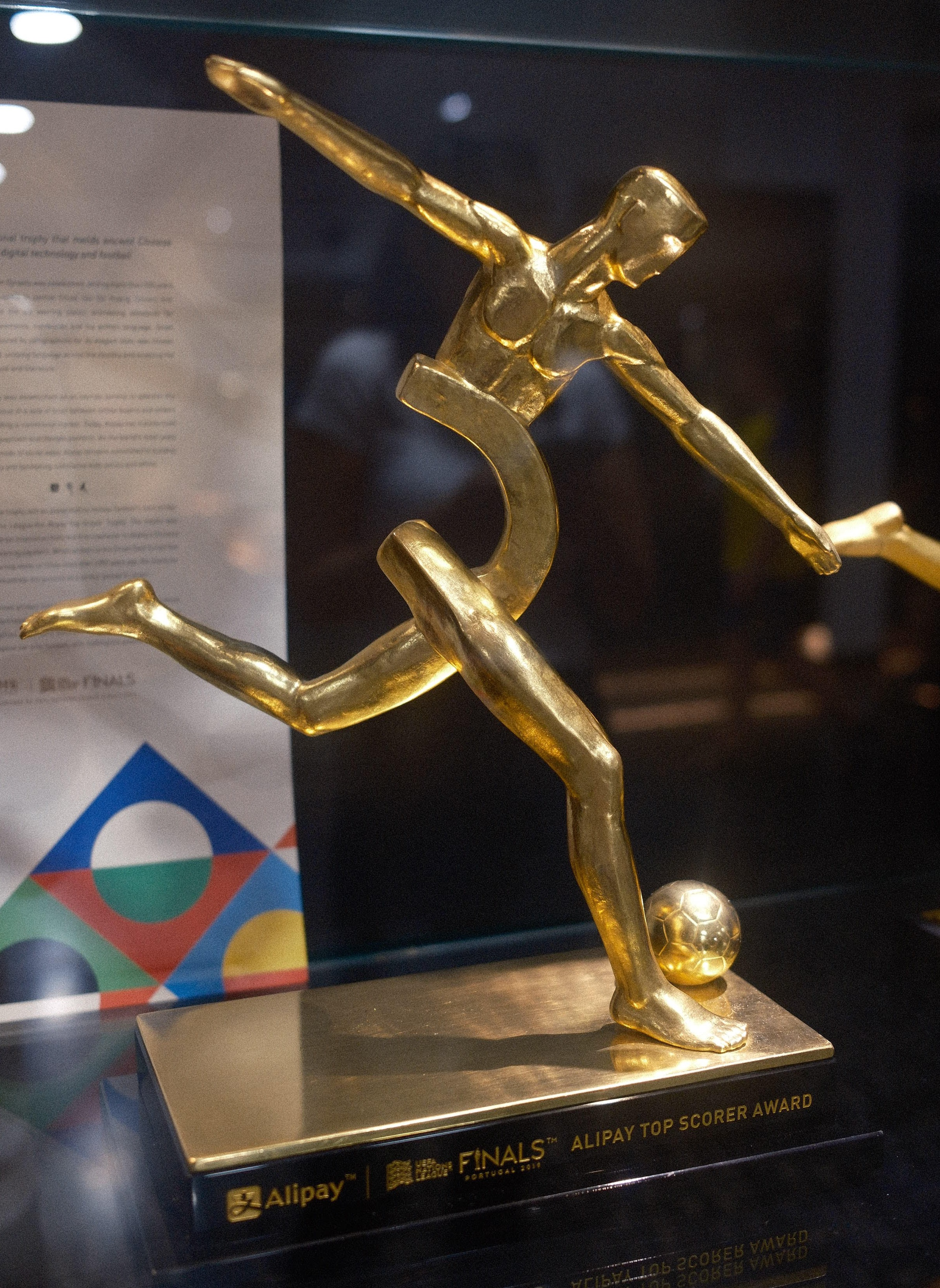
Trophy in the Museu CR7.

The "Alipay Top Scorer Trophy", given to the top scorer in the Nations League Finals, was awarded to Cristiano Ronaldo, who scored a hat-trick in the semi-final against Switzerland. The ranking was determined using the following criteria: 1) goals in Nations League Finals, 2) assists in Nations League Finals, 3) fewest minutes played in Nations League Finals, 4) goals in league phase 5) fewest yellow and red cards in Nations League Finals, 6) fewest yellow and red cards in league phase.

Top scorer rankings
Rank	Player	Goals	Assists	Minutes
1st place, gold medalist(s)	(Portugal) Cristiano Ronaldo	3	0	191
2nd place, silver medalist(s)	(Portugal) Gonçalo Guedes	1	1	101
3rd place, bronze medalist(s)	(England) Marcus Rashford	1	0	49

Goal of the Tournament

The SOCAR Goal of the Tournament was decided by online voting. A total four goals were in the shortlist, chosen by UEFA's technical observers, from two players: Cristiano Ronaldo (all three goals against Switzerland) and Matthijs de Ligt (against England). Ronaldo won the award for his second goal against Switzerland.

Rank	Goalscorer	Opponent	Score	Result	Round
1st place, gold medalist(s)	(Portugal) Cristiano Ronaldo	Switzerland	2–1	3–1	Semi-finals
2nd place, silver medalist(s)	(Portugal) Cristiano Ronaldo	Switzerland	3–1	3–1	Semi-finals
3rd place, bronze medalist(s)	(Portugal) Cristiano Ronaldo	Switzerland	1–0	3–1	Semi-finals
4	(Netherlands) Matthijs de Ligt	England	1–1	3–1 (a.e.t.)	Semi-finals

=== Discipline ===
A player was automatically suspended for the next match for receiving a red card, which could be extended for serious offences. Yellow card suspensions did not apply in the Nations League Finals.

The following suspensions were served during the tournament:

Player	Offence(s)	Suspension(s)
(Portugal) Danilo Pereira	(red card) in league phase vs Poland (20 November 2018)	Semi-finals vs Switzerland (5 June 2019)

== Prize money ==
The prize money to be distributed was announced in October 2018. In addition to the €2.25 million solidarity fee for participating in the Nations League, the four participants received an additional €2.25 million for winning their groups and qualifying for the Nations League Finals.

In addition, the participants received payment based on performance:

- Winners: €6 million
- Runners-up: €4.5 million
- Third place: €3.5 million
- Fourth place: €2.5 million

This meant that the maximum amount of solidarity and bonus fees for the UEFA Nations League winners was €10.5 million.
