= 2018–19 UEFA Nations League =

2018–2019 edition of the UEFA Nations League

Tournament details
- Dates: League phase: 6 September – 20 November 2018; Nations League Finals: 5–9 June 2019
- Teams: 55

Final positions
- Champions: Portugal (1st title)
- Runners-up: Netherlands
- Third place: England
- Fourth place: Switzerland

Tournament statistics
- Matches played: 142
- Goals scored: 342 (2.41 per match)
- Attendance: 2,467,041 (17,374 per match)
- Top scorer: (Serbia) Aleksandar Mitrović (6 goals)

The 2018–19 UEFA Nations League was the inaugural season of the UEFA Nations League, an international association football competition involving the men's national teams of the 55 member associations of UEFA. The league phase of the competition was played between September and November 2018, with the finals tournament for the group winners from League A taking place in Portugal in June 2019. Team performances in the league phase were used to seed teams for the qualifying group stage of UEFA Euro 2020, and awarded berths in the play-offs, which decided four of the twenty-four final tournament slots.

== Format ==
The format and schedule of the UEFA Nations League was formally approved by the UEFA Executive Committee on 4 December 2014. According to the approved format, the 55 UEFA national teams were divided into four divisions (called "leagues"): 12 teams in League A, 12 teams in League B, 15 teams in League C, and 16 teams in League D. For the 2018–19 UEFA Nations League, teams were divided according to their UEFA national team coefficients after the conclusion of the 2018 FIFA World Cup qualifiers (play-off results were not included), with the highest-ranked teams playing in League A, the next highest-ranked teams playing in League B, etc.

Each league was divided into four groups of three or four teams, so each team played four or six matches within their group (using the home-and-away round-robin format), on double matchdays in September, October and November 2018.

In the top division, League A, teams competed to become the UEFA Nations League champions. The four group winners of League A qualified for the Nations League Finals in June 2019, which was played in a knockout format, consisting of the semi-finals, third place play-off, and final. The semi-final pairings, along with the administrative home teams for the third place play-off and final, were determined by means of an open draw on 3 December 2018. Host country Portugal was selected among the four qualified teams on 3 December 2018 by the UEFA Executive Committee, with the winners of the final crowned as the Nations League champions.

Teams also competed for promotion and relegation to a higher or lower league. In each league, the four group winners (except League A) were promoted, while the last-placed teams of each group (except League D) were initially to be relegated; the exception was in League C, where due to different-sized groups, the three fourth-placed teams and the lowest-ranking third-placed team were initially to be relegated. However, due to a revamp of the format for the 2020–21 UEFA Nations League, no teams were eventually relegated, and some second-placed and third-placed teams were also promoted.

== Tiebreakers ==
=== Tiebreakers for group ranking ===
If two or more teams in the same group were equal on points on completion of the league phase, the following tie-breaking criteria were applied:

1. Higher number of points obtained in the matches played among the teams in question;
2. Superior goal difference in matches played among the teams in question;
3. Higher number of goals scored in the matches played among the teams in question;
4. Higher number of goals scored away from home in the matches played among the teams in question;
5. If, after having applied criteria 1 to 4, teams still had an equal ranking, criteria 1 to 4 were reapplied exclusively to the matches between the teams in question to determine their final rankings. (Note: When there were two or more teams tied in points, criteria 1 to 4 were applied. After these criteria were applied, they may have defined the position of some of the teams involved, but not all of them. For example, if there was a three-way tie on points, the application of the first four criteria could only break the tie for one of the teams, leaving the other two teams still tied. In this case, the tiebreaking procedure was resumed, from the beginning, for those teams that were still tied.) If this procedure did not lead to a decision, criteria 6 to 10 applied;
6. Superior goal difference in all group matches;
7. Higher number of goals scored in all group matches;
8. Higher number of away goals scored in all group matches;
9. Higher number of wins in all group matches;
10. Higher number of away wins in all group matches;
11. Disciplinary points in all group matches (1 point for a single yellow card, 3 points for a red card as a consequence of two yellow cards, 3 points for a direct red card, 4 points for a yellow card followed by a direct red card);
12. Position in the UEFA national team coefficient ranking system. (Note: If two or more associations had the same reference period coefficient, the following criteria were applied to the most recent half cycle: 1. Coefficient; 2. Average goal difference; 3. Average number of goals scored; 4. Average number of away goals scored; 5. Average disciplinary points (1 point for a single yellow card, 3 points for a red card as a consequence of two yellow cards, 3 points for a direct red card, 4 points for a yellow card followed by a direct red card); 6. Drawing of lots.)

To determine the worst third-placed team in League C, the results against the teams in fourth place were discarded. The following criteria were applied:

1. Higher number of points;
2. Superior goal difference;
3. Higher number of goals scored;
4. Higher number of goals scored away from home;
5. Higher number of wins;
6. Higher number of wins away from home;
7. Disciplinary points in all group matches (1 point for a single yellow card, 3 points for a red card as a consequence of two yellow cards, 3 points for a direct red card, 4 points for a yellow card followed by a direct red card);
8. Position in the UEFA national team coefficient ranking system.

=== Criteria for league ranking ===
Individual league rankings were established according to the following criteria:

1. Position in the group;
2. Higher number of points;
3. Superior goal difference;
4. Higher number of goals scored;
5. Higher number of goals scored away from home;
6. Higher number of wins;
7. Higher number of wins away from home;
8. Disciplinary points in all group matches (1 point for a single yellow card, 3 points for a red card as a consequence of two yellow cards, 3 points for a direct red card, 4 points for a yellow card followed by a direct red card);
9. Position in the UEFA national team coefficient ranking system.

In order to rank teams in leagues composed of different-sized groups, the following procedure is applied:

1. The results against fourth-placed teams were not taken into account for the purposes of comparing teams placed first, second, and third in their respective groups.
2. All results were taken into account for the purposes of comparing teams placed fourth in their respective groups.

The ranking of the top four teams in League A was determined by their finish in the Nations League Finals (first to fourth).

=== Criteria for overall ranking ===
For the purposes of the European Championship qualifying group stage draw and the European qualifying play-offs, overall UEFA Nations League rankings were established as follows:

1. The 12 League A teams were ranked 1st to 12th according to their league rankings.
2. The 12 League B teams were ranked 13th to 24th according to their league rankings.
3. The 15 League C teams were ranked 25th to 39th according to their league rankings.
4. The 16 League D teams were ranked 40th to 55th according to their league rankings.

=== UEFA Euro 2020 qualifying ===
The 2018–19 UEFA Nations League was linked with UEFA Euro 2020 qualifying, providing teams another chance to qualify for UEFA Euro 2020.

The main qualifying process began in March 2019 instead of immediately in September 2018 following the 2018 FIFA World Cup and ended in November 2019. The format remained largely the same, although only 20 of the 24 spots for the finals tournament were decided from the main qualifying process, leaving four spots still to be decided. The 55 teams were drawn into 10 groups after the completion of the UEFA Nations League (five groups of five teams and five groups of six teams, with the four UEFA Nations League Finals participants guaranteed to be drawn into groups of five teams), with the top two teams in each group qualifying. The draw seeding was based on the overall rankings of the Nations League. The qualifiers were played on double matchdays in March, June, September, October, and November 2019.

Following the qualifying group stage, the qualifying play-offs took place in October and November 2020. Unlike previous editions, the participants of the play-offs were not decided based on results from the qualifying group stage. Instead, 16 teams were selected based on their performance in the Nations League. These teams were divided into four paths, each containing four teams, with one team from each path qualifying for the final tournament. Each league had its own play-off path if at least four teams were available. The Nations League group winners automatically qualified for the play-off path of their league. If a group winner had already qualified through the conventional qualifying group stage, they were replaced by the next best-ranked team in the same league. However, if there were not enough teams in the same league, then the spot would go to the next-best team in the overall ranking. However, group winners could not face teams from a higher league.

Each play-off path featured two single-leg semi-finals and one single-leg final. The best-ranked team hosted the fourth-ranked team, and the second-ranked team hosted the third-ranked team. The host of the final was decided by a draw, with semi-final winner 1 or 2 hosting the final. The four play-off path winners joined the 20 teams which had already qualified for UEFA Euro 2020.

== Schedule ==
Below was the schedule of the 2018–19 UEFA Nations League.

| Stage | Round | Dates |
|---|---|---|
| League phase | Matchday 1 | 6–8 September 2018 |
| League phase | Matchday 2 | 9–11 September 2018 |
| League phase | Matchday 3 | 11–13 October 2018 |
| League phase | Matchday 4 | 14–16 October 2018 |
| League phase | Matchday 5 | 15–17 November 2018 |
| League phase | Matchday 6 | 18–20 November 2018 |
| Finals | Semi-finals | 5–6 June 2019 |
| Finals | Third place play-off | 9 June 2019 |
| Finals | Final | 9 June 2019 |

The fixture list was confirmed by UEFA on 24 January 2018 following the draw.

== Seeding ==
Map showing the leagues each national team participated in. League A League B League C League D

All 55 UEFA national teams were eligible to compete in the 2018–19 UEFA Nations League. The 55 members at the time were divided into the four "Leagues" (12 teams in League A, 12 teams in League B, 15 teams in League C, and 16 teams in League D) according to their UEFA national team coefficients after the conclusion of the 2018 FIFA World Cup qualifiers (not including the play-offs), with the highest-ranked teams playing in League A, etc. The seeding pots for the draw were announced on 7 December 2017.

League A
| Pot | Team | Coeff | Rank |
|---|---|---|---|
| 1 | Germany | 40,747 | 1 |
| 1 | Portugal | 38,655 | 2 |
| 1 | Belgium | 38,123 | 3 |
| 1 | Spain | 37,311 | 4 |
| 2 | France | 36,617 | 5 |
| 2 | England | 36,231 | 6 |
| 2 | Switzerland | 34,986 | 7 |
| 2 | Italy | 34,426 | 8 |
| 3 | Poland | 32,982 | 9 |
| 3 | Iceland | 31,155 | 10 |
| 3 | Croatia | 31,139 | 11 |
| 3 | Netherlands | 29,866 | 12 |

League C
| Pot | Team | Coeff | Rank |
|---|---|---|---|
| 1 | Hungary | 26,486 | 25 |
| 1 | Romania | 26,057 | 26 |
| 1 | Scotland | 25,662 | 27 |
| 1 | Slovenia | 25,148 | 28 |
| 2 | Greece | 24,931 | 29 |
| 2 | Serbia | 24,847 | 30 |
| 2 | Albania | 24,430 | 31 |
| 2 | Norway | 24,208 | 32 |
| 3 | Montenegro | 23,912 | 33 |
| 3 | Israel | 22,792 | 34 |
| 3 | Bulgaria | 22,091 | 35 |
| 3 | Finland | 20,501 | 36 |
| 4 | Cyprus | 19,491 | 37 |
| 4 | Estonia | 19,441 | 38 |
| 4 | Lithuania | 18,101 | 39 |

League B
| Pot | Team | Coeff | Rank |
|---|---|---|---|
| 1 | Austria | 29,418 | 13 |
| 1 | Wales | 29,269 | 14 |
| 1 | Russia | 29,258 | 15 |
| 1 | Slovakia | 28,555 | 16 |
| 2 | Sweden | 28,487 | 17 |
| 2 | Ukraine | 28,286 | 18 |
| 2 | Republic of Ireland | 28,249 | 19 |
| 2 | Bosnia and Herzegovina | 28,200 | 20 |
| 3 | Northern Ireland | 27,127 | 21 |
| 3 | Denmark | 27,052 | 22 |
| 3 | Czech Republic | 27,028 | 23 |
| 3 | Turkey | 26,538 | 24 |

League D
| Pot | Team | Coeff | Rank |
|---|---|---|---|
| 1 | Azerbaijan | 17,761 | 40 |
| 1 | Macedonia | 17,071 | 41 |
| 1 | Belarus | 16,868 | 42 |
| 1 | Georgia | 16,523 | 43 |
| 2 | Armenia | 15,846 | 44 |
| 2 | Latvia | 15,821 | 45 |
| 2 | Faroe Islands | 15,490 | 46 |
| 2 | Luxembourg | 14,231 | 47 |
| 3 | Kazakhstan | 13,431 | 48 |
| 3 | Moldova | 13,130 | 49 |
| 3 | Liechtenstein | 10,950 | 50 |
| 3 | Malta | 10,870 | 51 |
| 4 | Andorra | 10,240 | 52 |
| 4 | Kosovo | 9,950 | 53 |
| 4 | San Marino | 8,190 | 54 |
| 4 | Gibraltar | 7,550 | 55 |

The draw for the league phase took place at the SwissTech Convention Center in Lausanne, Switzerland on 24 January 2018, 12:00 CET.

For political reasons, Armenia and Azerbaijan (due to the Nagorno-Karabakh conflict), as well as Russia and Ukraine (due to the Russian military intervention in Ukraine), could not be drawn in the same group. Due to winter venue restrictions, a group could contain a maximum of two of the following teams: Norway, Finland, Estonia, Lithuania. Due to excessive travel restrictions, only one of Andorra, Faroe Islands, or Gibraltar could be drawn with Kazakhstan, while Gibraltar could not be with Azerbaijan if they had Kazakhstan.

== League A ==
=== Group A1 ===
| Pos | Team | Pld | W | D | L | GF | GA | GD | Pts | Qualification (Note: Due to revamp of the format for the 2020–21 UEFA Nations League, no teams were eventually relegated.) | (Netherlands) | (France) | (Germany) |
|---|---|---|---|---|---|---|---|---|---|---|---|---|---|
| 1 | Netherlands | 4 | 2 | 1 | 1 | 8 | 4 | +4 | 7 (Note: Head-to-head goal difference: Netherlands +1, France −1.) | Qualification for Nations League Finals | — | 2–0 | 3–0 |
| 2 | France | 4 | 2 | 1 | 1 | 4 | 4 | 0 | 7 | | 2–1 | — | 2–1 |
| 3 | Germany | 4 | 0 | 2 | 2 | 3 | 7 | −4 | 2 | | 2–2 | 0–0 | — |

Source: UEFA

=== Group A2 ===
| Pos | Team | Pld | W | D | L | GF | GA | GD | Pts | Qualification (Note: Due to revamp of the format for the 2020–21 UEFA Nations League, no teams were eventually relegated.) | (Switzerland) | (Belgium) | (Iceland) |
|---|---|---|---|---|---|---|---|---|---|---|---|---|---|
| 1 | Switzerland | 4 | 3 | 0 | 1 | 14 | 5 | +9 | 9 (Note: Head-to-head goal difference: Switzerland +2, Belgium −2.) | Qualification for Nations League Finals | — | 5–2 | 6–0 |
| 2 | Belgium | 4 | 3 | 0 | 1 | 9 | 6 | +3 | 9 | | 2–1 | — | 2–0 |
| 3 | Iceland | 4 | 0 | 0 | 4 | 1 | 13 | −12 | 0 | | 1–2 | 0–3 | — |

Source: UEFA

=== Group A3 ===
| Pos | Team | Pld | W | D | L | GF | GA | GD | Pts | Qualification (Note: Due to revamp of the format for the 2020–21 UEFA Nations League, no teams were eventually relegated.) | (Portugal) | (Italy) | (Poland) |
|---|---|---|---|---|---|---|---|---|---|---|---|---|---|
| 1 | Portugal | 4 | 2 | 2 | 0 | 5 | 3 | +2 | 8 | Qualification for Nations League Finals | — | 1–0 | 1–1 |
| 2 | Italy | 4 | 1 | 2 | 1 | 2 | 2 | 0 | 5 | | 0–0 | — | 1–1 |
| 3 | Poland | 4 | 0 | 2 | 2 | 4 | 6 | −2 | 2 | | 2–3 | 0–1 | — |

Source: UEFA

=== Group A4 ===
| Pos | Team | Pld | W | D | L | GF | GA | GD | Pts | Qualification (Note: Due to revamp of the format for the 2020–21 UEFA Nations League, no teams were eventually relegated.) | (England) | (Spain) | (Croatia) |
|---|---|---|---|---|---|---|---|---|---|---|---|---|---|
| 1 | England | 4 | 2 | 1 | 1 | 6 | 5 | +1 | 7 | Qualification for Nations League Finals | — | 1–2 | 2–1 |
| 2 | Spain | 4 | 2 | 0 | 2 | 12 | 7 | +5 | 6 | | 2–3 | — | 6–0 |
| 3 | Croatia | 4 | 1 | 1 | 2 | 4 | 10 | −6 | 4 | | 0–0 | 3–2 | — |

Source: UEFA

=== Nations League Finals ===
The host of the Nations League Finals, Portugal, was selected from the four qualified teams. The semi-finals pairings were determined by means of an open draw, along with the administrative home teams for the third place play-off and final. The draw took place on 3 December 2018, 14:30 CET (13:30 local time), at the Shelbourne Hotel in Dublin, Republic of Ireland. For scheduling purposes, the semi-final pairing involving the host team was considered to be semi-final 1.

Times are CEST (UTC+2), as listed by UEFA (local times are in parentheses).

==== Bracket ====
Semi-finals
5 June 2019 – Porto
Portugal | 3
Switzerland | 1
6 June 2019 – Guimarães
Netherlands (a.e.t.) | 3
England | 1

Final
9 June 2019 – Porto
Portugal | 1
Netherlands | 0
Third place play-off
9 June 2019 – Guimarães
Switzerland | 0 (5)
England (p) | 0 (6)

==== Semi-finals ====
5 June 2019
20:45 (19:45 UTC+1)

| Portugal | 3–1 | Switzerland |
|---|---|---|
| Ronaldo 25', 88', 90' | Report | Rodriguez 57' (pen.) |

Estádio do Dragão, Porto
Attendance: 42,415
Referee: Felix Brych (Germany)

6 June 2019
20:45 (19:45 UTC+1)

| Netherlands | 3–1 (a.e.t.) | England |
|---|---|---|
| De Ligt 73'; Walker 97' (o.g.); Promes 114' | Report | Rashford 32' (pen.) |

Estádio D. Afonso Henriques, Guimarães
Attendance: 25,711
Referee: Clément Turpin (France)

==== Third-place play-off ====
9 June 2019
15:00 (14:00 UTC+1)

| Switzerland | 0–0 (a.e.t.) | England |
|---|---|---|
| | Report |
Penalties
| Zuber (penalty scored); Xhaka (penalty scored); Akanji (penalty scored); Mbabu (penalty scored); Schär (penalty scored); Drmić (penalty missed) | 5–6 | (penalty scored) Maguire; (penalty scored) Barkley; (penalty scored) Sancho; (penalty scored) Sterling; (penalty scored) Pickford; (penalty scored) Dier |

Estádio D. Afonso Henriques, Guimarães
Attendance: 15,742
Referee: Ovidiu Hațegan (Romania)

==== Final ====
9 June 2019
20:45 (19:45 UTC+1)

| Portugal | 1–0 | Netherlands |
|---|---|---|
| Guedes 60' | Report |

Estádio do Dragão, Porto
Attendance: 43,199
Referee: Alberto Undiano Mallenco (Spain)

=== Top goalscorers ===
League A top goalscorers
| Rank | Player | Goals |
|---|---|---|
| 1 | (Switzerland) Haris Seferovic | 5 |
| 2 | (Belgium) Romelu Lukaku | 4 |
| 3 | (England) Marcus Rashford | 3 |
| 3 | (Portugal) Cristiano Ronaldo | 3 |
| 3 | (Portugal) André Silva | 3 |
| 3 | (Spain) Sergio Ramos | 3 |
| 7 | 13 players | 2 |
| 20 | 31 players | 1 |

== League B ==
=== Group B1 ===
| Pos | Team | Pld | W | D | L | GF | GA | GD | Pts | Promotion (Note: Due to revamp of the format for the 2020–21 UEFA Nations League, no teams were eventually relegated.) | (Ukraine) | (Czech Republic) | (Slovakia) |
|---|---|---|---|---|---|---|---|---|---|---|---|---|---|
| 1 | Ukraine (P) | 4 | 3 | 0 | 1 | 5 | 5 | 0 | 9 | Promotion to League A | — | 1–0 | 1–0 |
| 2 | Czech Republic | 4 | 2 | 0 | 2 | 4 | 4 | 0 | 6 | | 1–2 | — | 1–0 |
| 3 | Slovakia | 4 | 1 | 0 | 3 | 5 | 5 | 0 | 3 | | 4–1 | 1–2 | — |

Source: UEFA
(P) Promoted

=== Group B2 ===
| Pos | Team | Pld | W | D | L | GF | GA | GD | Pts | Promotion (Note: Due to revamp of the format for the 2020–21 UEFA Nations League, no teams were eventually relegated.) | (Sweden) | (Russia) | (Turkey) |
|---|---|---|---|---|---|---|---|---|---|---|---|---|---|
| 1 | Sweden (P) | 4 | 2 | 1 | 1 | 5 | 3 | +2 | 7 (Note: Head-to-head points: Sweden 4, Russia 1.) | Promotion to League A | — | 2–0 | 2–3 |
| 2 | Russia | 4 | 2 | 1 | 1 | 4 | 3 | +1 | 7 | | 0–0 | — | 2–0 |
| 3 | Turkey | 4 | 1 | 0 | 3 | 4 | 7 | −3 | 3 | | 0–1 | 1–2 | — |

Source: UEFA
(P) Promoted

=== Group B3 ===
| Pos | Team | Pld | W | D | L | GF | GA | GD | Pts | Promotion (Note: Due to revamp of the format for the 2020–21 UEFA Nations League, no teams were eventually relegated.) | (Bosnia and Herzegovina) | (Austria) | (Northern Ireland) |
|---|---|---|---|---|---|---|---|---|---|---|---|---|---|
| 1 | Bosnia and Herzegovina (P) | 4 | 3 | 1 | 0 | 5 | 1 | +4 | 10 | Promotion to League A | — | 1–0 | 2–0 |
| 2 | Austria | 4 | 2 | 1 | 1 | 3 | 2 | +1 | 7 | | 0–0 | — | 1–0 |
| 3 | Northern Ireland | 4 | 0 | 0 | 4 | 2 | 7 | −5 | 0 | | 1–2 | 1–2 | — |

Source: UEFA
(P) Promoted

=== Group B4 ===
| Pos | Team | Pld | W | D | L | GF | GA | GD | Pts | Promotion (Note: Due to revamp of the format for the 2020–21 UEFA Nations League, no teams were eventually relegated.) | (Denmark) | (Wales) | (Republic of Ireland) |
|---|---|---|---|---|---|---|---|---|---|---|---|---|---|
| 1 | Denmark (P) | 4 | 2 | 2 | 0 | 4 | 1 | +3 | 8 | Promotion to League A | — | 2–0 | 0–0 |
| 2 | Wales | 4 | 2 | 0 | 2 | 6 | 5 | +1 | 6 | | 1–2 | — | 4–1 |
| 3 | Republic of Ireland | 4 | 0 | 2 | 2 | 1 | 5 | −4 | 2 | | 0–0 | 0–1 | — |

Source: UEFA
(P) Promoted

=== Top goalscorers ===
League B top goalscorers
| Rank | Player | Goals |
|---|---|---|
| 1 | (Bosnia and Herzegovina) Edin Džeko | 3 |
| 1 | (Czech Republic) Patrik Schick | 3 |
| 3 | (Denmark) Christian Eriksen | 2 |
| 3 | (Russia) Denis Cheryshev | 2 |
| 3 | (Turkey) Emre Akbaba | 2 |
| 3 | (Ukraine) Yevhen Konoplyanka | 2 |
| 3 | (Wales) Gareth Bale | 2 |
| 8 | 32 players | 1 |

== League C ==
=== Group C1 ===
| Pos | Team | Pld | W | D | L | GF | GA | GD | Pts | Promotion (Note: Due to revamp of the format for the 2020–21 UEFA Nations League, no teams were eventually relegated, and the second-placed teams in each group were also promoted.) | (Scotland) | (Israel) | (Albania) |
|---|---|---|---|---|---|---|---|---|---|---|---|---|---|
| 1 | Scotland (P) | 4 | 3 | 0 | 1 | 10 | 4 | +6 | 9 | Promotion to League B | — | 3–2 | 2–0 |
| 2 | Israel (P) | 4 | 2 | 0 | 2 | 6 | 5 | +1 | 6 | Promotion to League B | 2–1 | — | 2–0 |
| 3 | Albania | 4 | 1 | 0 | 3 | 1 | 8 | −7 | 3 | | 0–4 | 1–0 | — |

Source: UEFA
(P) Promoted

=== Group C2 ===
| Pos | Team | Pld | W | D | L | GF | GA | GD | Pts | Promotion (Note: Due to revamp of the format for the 2020–21 UEFA Nations League, no teams were eventually relegated, and the second-placed teams in each group were also promoted.) | (Finland) | (Hungary) | (Greece) | (Estonia) |
|---|---|---|---|---|---|---|---|---|---|---|---|---|---|---|
| 1 | Finland (P) | 6 | 4 | 0 | 2 | 5 | 3 | +2 | 12 | Promotion to League B | — | 1–0 | 2–0 | 1–0 |
| 2 | Hungary (P) | 6 | 3 | 1 | 2 | 9 | 6 | +3 | 10 | Promotion to League B | 2–0 | — | 2–1 | 2–0 |
| 3 | Greece | 6 | 3 | 0 | 3 | 4 | 5 | −1 | 9 | | 1–0 | 1–0 | — | 0–1 |
| 4 | Estonia | 6 | 1 | 1 | 4 | 4 | 8 | −4 | 4 | | 0–1 | 3–3 | 0–1 | — |

Source: UEFA
(P) Promoted

=== Group C3 ===
| Pos | Team | Pld | W | D | L | GF | GA | GD | Pts | Promotion (Note: Due to revamp of the format for the 2020–21 UEFA Nations League, no teams were eventually relegated, and the second-placed teams in each group were also promoted.) | (Norway) | (Bulgaria) | (Cyprus) | (Slovenia) |
|---|---|---|---|---|---|---|---|---|---|---|---|---|---|---|
| 1 | Norway (P) | 6 | 4 | 1 | 1 | 7 | 2 | +5 | 13 | Promotion to League B | — | 1–0 | 2–0 | 1–0 |
| 2 | Bulgaria (P) | 6 | 3 | 2 | 1 | 7 | 5 | +2 | 11 | Promotion to League B | 1–0 | — | 2–1 | 1–1 |
| 3 | Cyprus | 6 | 1 | 2 | 3 | 5 | 9 | −4 | 5 | | 0–2 | 1–1 | — | 2–1 |
| 4 | Slovenia | 6 | 0 | 3 | 3 | 5 | 8 | −3 | 3 | | 1–1 | 1–2 | 1–1 | — |

Source: UEFA
(P) Promoted

=== Group C4 ===
| Pos | Team | Pld | W | D | L | GF | GA | GD | Pts | Promotion (Note: Due to revamp of the format for the 2020–21 UEFA Nations League, no teams were eventually relegated, and the second-placed teams in each group were also promoted.) | (Serbia) | (Romania) | (Montenegro) | (Lithuania) |
|---|---|---|---|---|---|---|---|---|---|---|---|---|---|---|
| 1 | Serbia (P) | 6 | 4 | 2 | 0 | 11 | 4 | +7 | 14 | Promotion to League B | — | 2–2 | 2–1 | 4–1 |
| 2 | Romania (P) | 6 | 3 | 3 | 0 | 8 | 3 | +5 | 12 | Promotion to League B | 0–0 | — | 0–0 | 3–0 |
| 3 | Montenegro | 6 | 2 | 1 | 3 | 7 | 6 | +1 | 7 | | 0–2 | 0–1 | — | 2–0 |
| 4 | Lithuania | 6 | 0 | 0 | 6 | 3 | 16 | −13 | 0 | | 0–1 | 1–2 | 1–4 | — |

Source: UEFA
(P) Promoted

=== Top goalscorers ===
League C top goalscorers
| Rank | Player | Goals |
|---|---|---|
| 1 | (Serbia) Aleksandar Mitrović | 6 |
| 2 | (Scotland) James Forrest | 5 |
| 3 | (Hungary) Ádám Szalai | 4 |
| 4 | (Finland) Teemu Pukki | 3 |
| 4 | (Montenegro) Stefan Mugoša | 3 |
| 6 | (Bulgaria) Bozhidar Kraev | 2 |
| 6 | (Norway) Stefan Johansen | 2 |
| 6 | (Norway) Ola Kamara | 2 |
| 6 | (Romania) Nicolae Stanciu | 2 |
| 6 | (Romania) George Țucudean | 2 |
| 6 | (Serbia) Adem Ljajić | 2 |
| 6 | (Slovenia) Miha Zajc | 2 |
| 13 | 50 players | 1 |

== League D ==
=== Group D1 ===
| Pos | Team | Pld | W | D | L | GF | GA | GD | Pts | Promotion (Note: Due to revamp of the format for the 2020–21 UEFA Nations League, the second-placed teams in each group and the best third-placed team among all groups were also promoted.) | (Georgia (country)) | (Kazakhstan) | (Latvia) | (Andorra) |
|---|---|---|---|---|---|---|---|---|---|---|---|---|---|---|
| 1 | Georgia (P) | 6 | 5 | 1 | 0 | 12 | 2 | +10 | 16 | Promotion to League C | — | 2–1 | 1–0 | 3–0 |
| 2 | Kazakhstan (P) | 6 | 1 | 3 | 2 | 8 | 7 | +1 | 6 | Promotion to League C | 0–2 | — | 1–1 | 4–0 |
| 3 | Latvia | 6 | 0 | 4 | 2 | 2 | 6 | −4 | 4 (Note: Tied on head-to-head results. Overall goal difference was used as the tiebreaker.) | | 0–3 | 1–1 | — | 0–0 |
| 4 | Andorra | 6 | 0 | 4 | 2 | 2 | 9 | −7 | 4 | | 1–1 | 1–1 | 0–0 | — |

Source: UEFA
(P) Promoted

=== Group D2 ===
| Pos | Team | Pld | W | D | L | GF | GA | GD | Pts | Promotion (Note: Due to revamp of the format for the 2020–21 UEFA Nations League, the second-placed teams in each group and the best third-placed team among all groups were also promoted.) | (Belarus) | (Luxembourg) | (Moldova) | (San Marino) |
|---|---|---|---|---|---|---|---|---|---|---|---|---|---|---|
| 1 | Belarus (P) | 6 | 4 | 2 | 0 | 10 | 0 | +10 | 14 | Promotion to League C | — | 1–0 | 0–0 | 5–0 |
| 2 | Luxembourg (P) | 6 | 3 | 1 | 2 | 11 | 4 | +7 | 10 | Promotion to League C | 0–2 | — | 4–0 | 3–0 |
| 3 | Moldova (P) | 6 | 2 | 3 | 1 | 4 | 5 | −1 | 9 | Promotion to League C | 0–0 | 1–1 | — | 2–0 |
| 4 | San Marino | 6 | 0 | 0 | 6 | 0 | 16 | −16 | 0 | | 0–2 | 0–3 | 0–1 | — |

Source: UEFA
(P) Promoted

=== Group D3 ===
| Pos | Team | Pld | W | D | L | GF | GA | GD | Pts | Promotion (Note: Due to revamp of the format for the 2020–21 UEFA Nations League, the second-placed teams in each group and the best third-placed team among all groups were also promoted.) | (Kosovo) | (Azerbaijan) | (Faroe Islands) | (Malta) |
|---|---|---|---|---|---|---|---|---|---|---|---|---|---|---|
| 1 | Kosovo (P) | 6 | 4 | 2 | 0 | 15 | 2 | +13 | 14 | Promotion to League C | — | 4–0 | 2–0 | 3–1 |
| 2 | Azerbaijan (P) | 6 | 2 | 3 | 1 | 7 | 6 | +1 | 9 | Promotion to League C | 0–0 | — | 2–0 | 1–1 |
| 3 | Faroe Islands | 6 | 1 | 2 | 3 | 5 | 10 | −5 | 5 | | 1–1 | 0–3 | — | 3–1 |
| 4 | Malta | 6 | 0 | 3 | 3 | 5 | 14 | −9 | 3 | | 0–5 | 1–1 | 1–1 | — |

Source: UEFA
(P) Promoted

=== Group D4 ===
| Pos | Team | Pld | W | D | L | GF | GA | GD | Pts | Promotion (Note: Due to revamp of the format for the 2020–21 UEFA Nations League, the second-placed teams in each group and the best third-placed team among all groups were also promoted.) | (North Macedonia) | (Armenia) | (Gibraltar) | (Liechtenstein) |
|---|---|---|---|---|---|---|---|---|---|---|---|---|---|---|
| 1 | Macedonia (P) | 6 | 5 | 0 | 1 | 14 | 5 | +9 | 15 | Promotion to League C | — | 2–0 | 4–0 | 4–1 |
| 2 | Armenia (P) | 6 | 3 | 1 | 2 | 14 | 8 | +6 | 10 | Promotion to League C | 4–0 | — | 0–1 | 2–1 |
| 3 | Gibraltar | 6 | 2 | 0 | 4 | 5 | 15 | −10 | 6 | | 0–2 | 2–6 | — | 2–1 |
| 4 | Liechtenstein | 6 | 1 | 1 | 4 | 7 | 12 | −5 | 4 | | 0–2 | 2–2 | 2–0 | — |

Source: UEFA
(P) Promoted

=== Ranking of third-placed teams ===
| Pos | Grp | Team | Pld | W | D | L | GF | GA | GD | Pts | Promotion |
|---|---|---|---|---|---|---|---|---|---|---|---|
| 1 | D2 | Moldova (P) | 6 | 2 | 3 | 1 | 4 | 5 | −1 | 9 | Promotion to League C |
| 2 | D4 | Gibraltar | 6 | 2 | 0 | 4 | 5 | 15 | −10 | 6 | |
| 3 | D3 | Faroe Islands | 6 | 1 | 2 | 3 | 5 | 10 | −5 | 5 | |
| 4 | D1 | Latvia | 6 | 0 | 4 | 2 | 2 | 6 | −4 | 4 | |

Source: UEFA
Rules for classification: 1) Points; 2) Goal difference; 3) Goals scored; 4) Away goals scored; 5) Wins; 6) Away wins; 7) Disciplinary points; 8) UEFA national team coefficient.
(P) Promoted

=== Top goalscorers ===
League D top goalscorers
| Rank | Player | Goals |
|---|---|---|
| 1 | (Armenia) Yura Movsisyan | 5 |
| 1 | (Belarus) Stanislaw Drahun | 5 |
| 3 | (Georgia (country)) Giorgi Chakvetadze | 4 |
| 3 | (Kosovo) Arbër Zeneli | 4 |
| 5 | (Belarus) Anton Saroka | 3 |
| 5 | (Faroe Islands) René Joensen | 3 |
| 5 | (Kosovo) Benjamin Kololli | 3 |
| 5 | (Luxembourg) Danel Sinani | 3 |
| 5 | (North Macedonia) Ezgjan Alioski | 3 |
| 5 | (North Macedonia) Ilija Nestorovski | 3 |
| 5 | (North Macedonia) Aleksandar Trajkovski | 3 |
| 5 | (Moldova) Radu Gînsari | 3 |
| 13 | 14 players | 2 |
| 27 | 49 players | 1 |

== Overall ranking ==
The overall ranking after the league phase was used for seeding in the UEFA Euro 2020 qualifying group stage draw.

League A
League B

| Rnk | Team | Pld | Pts |
|---|---|---|---|
| 1 | Portugal | 4 | 8 |
| 2 | Netherlands | 4 | 7 |
| 3 | England | 4 | 7 |
| 4 | Switzerland | 4 | 9 |
| 5 | Belgium | 4 | 9 |
| 6 | France | 4 | 7 |
| 7 | Spain | 4 | 6 |
| 8 | Italy | 4 | 5 |
| 9 | Croatia | 4 | 4 |
| 10 | Poland | 4 | 2 |
| 11 | Germany | 4 | 2 |
| 12 | Iceland | 4 | 0 |

Source: UEFA

| Rnk | Team | Pld | Pts |
|---|---|---|---|
| 13 | Bosnia and Herzegovina | 4 | 10 |
| 14 | Ukraine | 4 | 9 |
| 15 | Denmark | 4 | 8 |
| 16 | Sweden | 4 | 7 |
| 17 | Russia | 4 | 7 |
| 18 | Austria | 4 | 7 |
| 19 | Wales | 4 | 6 |
| 20 | Czech Republic | 4 | 6 |
| 21 | Slovakia | 4 | 3 |
| 22 | Turkey | 4 | 3 |
| 23 | Republic of Ireland | 4 | 2 |
| 24 | Northern Ireland | 4 | 0 |

Source: UEFA
League C
League D

| Rnk | Team | Pld | Pts |
|---|---|---|---|
| 25 | Scotland | 4 | 9 |
| 26 | Norway | 4 | 9 |
| 27 | Serbia | 4 | 8 |
| 28 | Finland | 4 | 6 |
| 29 | Bulgaria | 4 | 7 |
| 30 | Israel | 4 | 6 |
| 31 | Hungary | 4 | 6 |
| 32 | Romania | 4 | 6 |
| 33 | Greece | 4 | 6 |
| 34 | Albania | 4 | 3 |
| 35 | Montenegro | 4 | 1 |
| 36 | Cyprus | 4 | 1 |
| 37 | Estonia | 6 | 4 |
| 38 | Slovenia | 6 | 3 |
| 39 | Lithuania | 6 | 0 |

Source: UEFA

| Rnk | Team | Pld | Pts |
|---|---|---|---|
| 40 | Georgia | 6 | 16 |
| 41 | Macedonia | 6 | 15 |
| 42 | Kosovo | 6 | 14 |
| 43 | Belarus | 6 | 14 |
| 44 | Luxembourg | 6 | 10 |
| 45 | Armenia | 6 | 10 |
| 46 | Azerbaijan | 6 | 9 |
| 47 | Kazakhstan | 6 | 6 |
| 48 | Moldova | 6 | 9 |
| 49 | Gibraltar | 6 | 6 |
| 50 | Faroe Islands | 6 | 5 |
| 51 | Latvia | 6 | 4 |
| 52 | Liechtenstein | 6 | 4 |
| 53 | Andorra | 6 | 4 |
| 54 | Malta | 6 | 3 |
| 55 | San Marino | 6 | 0 |

Source: UEFA

== Prize money ==
The prize money to be distributed was announced in March 2018, with a total of €76.25 million in solidarity and bonus fees due to be distributed to the 55 participating national teams. However, in October 2018, the solidarity fees and bonus payments for group winners were increased by 50%, while the bonuses for the teams appearing in the Nations League Finals also increased, resulting in a total of €112.875 million in prize money.

The solidarity fees per team were scaled by league:

- League A: €2.25 million
- League B: €1.5 million
- League C: €1.125 million
- League D: €750,000

In addition, the group winners of each league received the following bonus fees:

- League A group winners: €2.25 million
- League B group winners: €1.5 million
- League C group winners: €1.125 million
- League D group winners: €750,000

The four group winners of League A, which participated in the Nations League Finals, also received the following bonus fees based on performance:

- Winners: €6 million
- Runners-up: €4.5 million
- Third place: €3.5 million
- Fourth place: €2.5 million

This meant that the maximum amount of solidarity and bonus fees was €10.5 million for a team from League A, €3 million for a team from League B, €2.25 million for a team from League C, and €1.5 million for a team from League D.

== Euro 2020 qualifying play-offs ==
Teams who failed in the UEFA Euro 2020 qualifying group stage could still qualify for the final tournament via the play-offs. Each league in the UEFA Nations League was allocated one of the four remaining UEFA Euro 2020 places. Four teams from each league who had not already qualified for the European Championship finals competed in the play-offs of their league, which were played in October and November 2020. The play-off berths were first allocated to each group winner, and if any of the group winners had already qualified for the European Championship finals, then to the next best ranked team of the league, etc.

The team selection process determined the 16 teams that competed in the play-offs based on a set of criteria. Teams in bold advanced to the play-offs.

League A
| Rank | Team |
|---|---|
| 1 ^{GW} | Portugal |
| 2 ^{GW} | Netherlands |
| 3 ^{GW} | England |
| 4 ^{GW} | Switzerland |
| 5 | Belgium |
| 6 | France |
| 7 | Spain |
| 8 | Italy |
| 9 | Croatia |
| 10 | Poland |
| 11 | Germany |
| 12 | Iceland |

League B
| Rank | Team |
|---|---|
| 13 ^{GW} | Bosnia and Herzegovina |
| 14 ^{GW} | Ukraine |
| 15 ^{GW} | Denmark |
| 16 ^{GW} | Sweden |
| 17 | Russia |
| 18 | Austria |
| 19 | Wales |
| 20 | Czech Republic |
| 21 | Slovakia |
| 22 | Turkey |
| 23 | Republic of Ireland |
| 24 | Northern Ireland |

League C
| Rank | Team |
|---|---|
| 25 ^{GW} | Scotland |
| 26 ^{GW} | Norway |
| 27 ^{GW} | Serbia |
| 28 ^{GW} | Finland |
| 29 | Bulgaria |
| 30 | Israel |
| 31 | Hungary |
| 32 | Romania |
| 33 | Greece |
| 34 | Albania |
| 35 | Montenegro |
| 36 | Cyprus |
| 37 | Estonia |
| 38 | Slovenia |
| 39 | Lithuania |

League D
| Rank | Team |
|---|---|
| 40 ^{GW} | Georgia |
| 41 ^{GW} | North Macedonia |
| 42 ^{GW} | Kosovo |
| 43 ^{GW} | Belarus |
| 44 | Luxembourg |
| 45 | Armenia |
| 46 | Azerbaijan |
| 47 | Kazakhstan |
| 48 | Moldova |
| 49 | Gibraltar |
| 50 | Faroe Islands |
| 51 | Latvia |
| 52 | Liechtenstein |
| 53 | Andorra |
| 54 | Malta |
| 55 | San Marino |

Key

1. ^{GW} Nations League group winner
2. ^{H} UEFA Euro 2020 host at the time of the draw
3. Team advanced to play-offs
4. Team qualified directly to final tournament
