= SwissTech Convention Center =

- Interactive map of the SwissTech Convention Center area

General information
- Type: convention center
- Location: Route Louis-Favre 2, Ecublens, Switzerland
- Coordinates: 46.5234621°N 6.564013°E
- Elevation: 397 m (1,302 ft)
- Inaugurated: 3 April 2014
- Cost: €110 million

Height
- Top floor: Auditorium A, B & C

Technical details
- Floor count: 3
- Floor area: 10'000 m2

Design and construction
- Architecture firm: Richter Dahl Rocha & Associés
- Awards: 2016 Winner of the Best Swiss Convention Center - Swiss MICE

Other information
- Seating capacity: From 300 to 3,000
- Number of rooms: 18

Website
- Official website

The SwissTech Convention Center is a conference centre on the campus of EPFL, the Swiss Federal Institute of Technology in Lausanne.

The SwissTech Convention Center is one of the largest convention centers in the Lake Geneva region and has served many major events.

== Building ==
The building was designed by the architectural firm Richter Dahl Rocha & Associés of Lausanne. It was financed by two Credit Suisse real estate funds for 120 million Swiss francs. The Credit Suisse owns the building, while the EPFL pays an annual rent of 6 million Swiss francs. This public-private partnership was criticised by the Swiss Federal Audit Office as "the conditions are unfavourable to the EPFL and favourable to the investor".

Financial support from the Swiss electricity supply company Romande énergie allowed the west facade of the building to be covered with panels made of organic dye-sensitized solar cell, also called "Grätzel cells" after Michael Grätzel, a physical chemistry professor at the EPFL and the inventor of this technology.

== Events ==
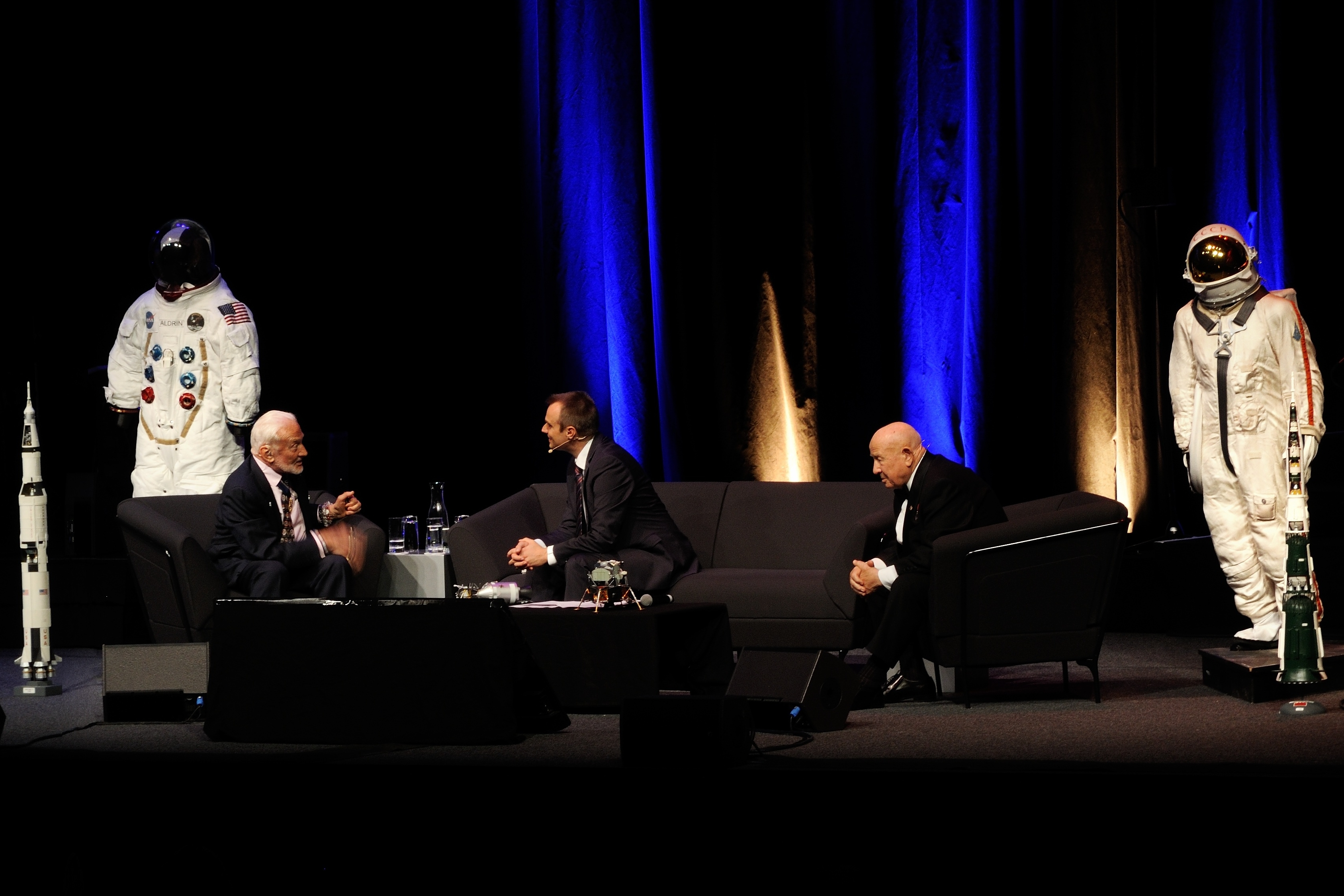
Space pioneers Buzz Aldrin and Alexei Leonov at the Swiss Tech Convention Centre in 2015

=== Regular ===
- Magistrale (EPFL graduation ceremonies)
- Planète Santé
- Forum EPFL
- PolyLAN
- The Brain Forum
- Applied Machine Learning Days

=== Other ===
- 13 November 2015: The Moon Race
- European Space Agency - EUCLID
- Sport Accord Convention 2016
- 11 July 2017: meeting of the International Olympic Committee about the 2024 Summer Olympics, with delegations including Emmanuel Macron
- 24 January 2018: draw for the 2018–19 UEFA Nations League
- June 2019: The 134th IOC Session
- 16 December 2024: draw for the UEFA Women's Euro 2025 finals.

== See also ==
- Lausanne campus
