= Gazanchi Fortress =

Fortress in Qazançı, Azerbaijan

- Azerbaijani: Qazançı Qalası
- Location within Azerbaijan

General information
- Location: Gazanchi, Julfa, Nakhchivan Autonomous Republic, Azerbaijan
- Coordinates: 39.241593°N 45.702224°E
- Completed: III-I millennium BC

The Gazanchi Fortress is a fortress dating from the third millennium BC located in the village of Gazanchi, Azerbaijan. It is believed to have been heavily occupied by local tribes and is depicted in painted ceramic artifacts as having been a significant social center during the Middle Bronze Age.

== See also ==
- Architecture of Azerbaijan
