= List of bridges in Azerbaijan =

This list of bridges in Azerbaijan lists bridges of particular historical, scenic, architectural or engineering interest. Road and railway bridges, viaducts, aqueducts and footbridges are included.

== Historical and architectural interest bridges ==
Photo		Name	Azerbaijani	Distinction	Length	Type	Carries Crosses	Opened	Location	Region	Ref.
	1	Red Bridge	Qırmızı Körpü	Azerbaijan–Georgia border Span : 26 m (85 ft)	175 m (574 ft)	Masonry; 4 arches	Footbridge; Khrami	12th century	II Şıxlı - Kirach-Mughanlo; 41°19′44.8″N 45°04′23.1″E	Ganja-Gazakh; Georgia	
	2	15-span Khudafarin Bridge	Onbeşaşırımlı Xudafərin körpüsü	Azerbaijan–Iran border	200 m (660 ft)	Masonry; 15 arches	Footbridge; Aras	12th century	Jabrayil - Khoda Afarin; 39°09′25.1″N 46°56′13.6″E	East Zangezur - East Azerbaijan	
	3	11-span Khudafarin Bridge	Onbiraşırımlı Xudafərin körpüsü	Azerbaijan–Iran border	130 m (430 ft)	Masonry; 11 arches	Out of order Aras	13th century	Jabrayil - Khoda Afarin; 39°9′2.2″N 46°56′24.0″E	East Zangezur - East Azerbaijan	
	4	Gazanchi Bridge	Qazançı körpüsü		11 m (36 ft)	Masonry; 1 arch	Footbridge; Alinja River	17th century	Qazançı; 39°9′25.0″N 46°56′13.8″E	Nakhchivan	

== Major road and railway bridges ==
This table presents the structures with spans greater than 100 meters (non-exhaustive list).

	Name	Azerbaijani	Span	Length	Type	Carries Crosses	Opened	Location	Region	Ref.
1	Cable-stayed bridge (Baku)		180 m (590 ft) (x2)	665 m (2,182 ft)	Cable-stayed; Concrete deck and pylon 180+180	Interchange; Boyuk Shor Highway	2012	Baku; 40°25′22.7″N 49°55′13.0″E	Absheron	
2	Kura River Highway Bridge (Salyan)		151 m (495 ft)	363 m (1,191 ft)	Arch; Steel tied-arch 50+50+151+50+50	M3; Kura		Salyan; 39°37′47.4″N 48°57′48.3″E	Aran	
3	Kura River Highway Bridge (Şirvan)		140 m (460 ft)	318 m (1,043 ft)	Box girder Prestressed concrete 82+140+82	M6; Kura		Şirvan; 39°56′59.9″N 48°53′03.8″E	Aran	

== See also ==
- Transport in Azerbaijan
- Rail transport in Azerbaijan
- Geography of Azerbaijan

== Notes and references ==
- Notes
- Nicolas Janberg. "International Database for Civil and Structural Engineering". Structurae.com.
- Others references
