= UEFA Euro 2020 =

16th edition of the UEFA European Football Championship

- Live It. For Real.

Tournament details
- Host countries: Azerbaijan; Denmark; England; Germany; Hungary; Italy; Netherlands; Romania; Russia; Scotland; Spain
- Dates: 11 June – 11 July 2021
- Teams: 24
- Venues: 11 (in 11 host cities)

Final positions
- Champions: Italy (2nd title)
- Runners-up: England
- Third place: Spain; Denmark

Tournament statistics
- Matches played: 51
- Goals scored: 142 (2.78 per match)
- Attendance: 1,099,278 (21,554 per match)
- Top scorers: (Czech Republic) Patrik Schick; (Portugal) Cristiano Ronaldo; (5 goals each)
- Best player: (Italy) Gianluigi Donnarumma
- Best young player: (Spain) Pedri

The 2020 UEFA European Football Championship, commonly referred to as UEFA Euro 2020 or simply Euro 2020, was the 16th UEFA European Championship, the quadrennial international men's football championship of Europe organised by the Union of European Football Associations (UEFA). To celebrate the 60th anniversary of the European Championship competition, UEFA president Michel Platini declared that the tournament would be hosted in several nations as a "romantic" one-off event, with 11 cities in 11 UEFA countries each providing venues for the tournament, making it the second senior international tournament in history after the 2007 AFC Asian Cup to have more than two nations co-hosting it.

Portugal were the defending champions, but were eliminated in the round of 16 by Belgium. Italy won their second European Championship title by beating England on penalties in the final following a 1–1 draw after extra time. The win came exactly on the 39th anniversary of Italy's 1982 FIFA World Cup final victory over West Germany.

The tournament was originally intended to be played between 12 June and 12 July 2020. Due to COVID-19 restrictions during that year, the tournament was postponed to June and July 2021, while retaining the name UEFA Euro 2020 and host venues. Alongside special rules regarding COVID-19 restrictions, UEFA also allowed two extra substitutions and implemented video assistant referee (VAR) for the first time. Initially, there were 13 venues chosen for the tournament but two were later dropped. Brussels was dropped in December 2017 after the city's Eurostadium was abandoned, while Dublin was dropped in April 2021 because there was no guarantee that spectators could attend. Spain originally intended to use Bilbao as a host venue but later changed it to Seville to allow for spectators at matches. UEFA chose Stadio Olimpico in Rome to host the opening match between Italy and Turkey, while Wembley Stadium in London was selected as a semi-final and final venue for the second time, following the 1996 tournament at the original stadium of the same name.

The tournament was well received by fans and commentators, with the most goals per game in a European Championship since the introduction of the group stage, and only two goalless games. The refereeing style was also praised, with a conservative use of VAR and quick decisions made on the pitch.

== Bid process ==
While some countries such as Belgium, Bulgaria and Romania, Germany, Hungary and Romania, Ireland, Scotland, and Wales, the Netherlands, and Turkey had already expressed an interest in bidding to host the tournament, then-UEFA president Michel Platini suggested at a press conference on 30 June 2012, a day before the UEFA Euro 2012 Final, that instead of having one host country, or joint hosting by multiple countries, the tournament could be spread over "12 or 13 cities" across the continent, as was done for that year's UEFA European Under-17 Championship elite round, where each of the seven groups was hosted by a different country.

=== European format decision ===
On 6 December 2012, UEFA announced the tournament would be held in multiple cities across Europe to mark the 60th anniversary of the tournament. The selection of the host cities did not guarantee an automatic qualifying berth to the national team of that country. UEFA reasoned that the pan-European staging of the tournament was the logical decision at a time of financial difficulty, such as the European debt crisis. Reaction to UEFA's plan was mixed across Europe. Critics cited the expanded format (from 31 matches featuring 16 nations to 51 featuring 24) and its associated additional costs as the decisive factor for only one nation (Turkey) having put forward a serious bid.

=== Bidding venues ===
The final list of bids was published by UEFA on 26 April 2014, with a decision on the hosts being made by the UEFA Executive Committee on 19 September 2014. There were two bids for the Finals Package (of which one was successful, marked with dark green for semi-finals and final) and 19 bids for the Standard Package (of which 12 were initially successful, marked with light green for quarter-finals and group stage, and yellow for round of 16 and group stage); Brussels, marked with red, were initially selected but removed from the list of venues by UEFA on 7 December 2017. Dublin, marked in red, was initially selected but removed from the list of venues by UEFA on 23 April 2021. On the same day, UEFA also announced the matches in Spain would be moved from Bilbao to Seville.

Successful bid for group stage and round of 16
Successful bid for group stage and quarter-finals
Successful bid for semi-finals and final. Later added: Group stage and round of 16
Successful bid for group stage and round of 16 at first but later removed from list
Successful bid for group stage and round of 16 but later changed to another venue in country
Unsuccessful bid (either rejected as judged by UEFA to not fulfill the bid requirements, or eliminated by vote)

Country	City	Venue	Capacity	Package	Result	#
Azerbaijan	Baku	Olympic Stadium	68,700	Standard Package	Group stage and quarter-finals	4
Belarus	Minsk	Dinamo Stadium	34,000 (to be expanded to 39,000)	Standard Package	Rejected	0
Belgium	Brussels	Eurostadium (proposed new national stadium)	50,000 (62,613 potentially)	Standard Package	Group stage and round of 16 (later cancelled)	0
Bulgaria	Sofia	Vasil Levski National Stadium	43,000 (to be expanded to 50,000)	Standard Package	Rejected	0
Denmark	Copenhagen	Parken Stadium	38,065	Standard Package	Group stage and round of 16	4
England	London	Wembley Stadium	90,000	Finals Package (withdrawn Standard Package)	Semi-finals and final Group stage and two round of 16 (later added)	8
Germany	Munich	Allianz Arena	70,000	Standard Package, Finals Package	Group stage and quarter-finals	4
Hungary	Budapest	Puskás Aréna	56,000 (proposed new 67,215 stadium)	Standard Package	Group stage and round of 16	4
Israel	Jerusalem	Teddy Stadium	34,000 (to be expanded to 53,000)	Standard Package	Rejected	0
Italy	Rome	Stadio Olimpico	70,634	Standard Package	Opening match, group stage and quarter-finals	4
Macedonia (Note: Now North Macedonia)	Skopje	Philip II Arena (Note: Renamed in 2019 to Toše Proeski Arena.)	33,460	Standard Package	Rejected	0
Netherlands	Amsterdam	Amsterdam Arena (Note: Renamed in 2018 to Johan Cruyff Arena)	54,990 (to be expanded to around 56,000)	Standard Package	Group stage and round of 16	4
Republic of Ireland	Dublin	Aviva Stadium	51,700	Standard Package	Group stage and round of 16 (later cancelled)	0
Romania	Bucharest	Arena Națională	55,600	Standard Package	Group stage and round of 16	4
Russia	Saint Petersburg	Krestovsky Stadium	68,134	Standard Package	Group stage (a second group later added) and quarter-finals	7
Scotland	Glasgow	Hampden Park	51,866	Standard Package	Group stage and round of 16	4
Spain	Bilbao	Estadio de San Mamés	53,289	Standard Package	Group stage and round of 16 (later moved to Estadio de La Cartuja in Seville)	4
Sweden	Stockholm	Friends Arena	54,329	Standard Package	Eliminated	0
Wales	Cardiff	Millennium Stadium	74,500	Standard Package	Eliminated	0

== Effects of the COVID-19 pandemic ==
=== Start of the pandemic and postponement ===
In early 2020, the COVID-19 pandemic in Europe triggered concerns regarding its potential effect on players, staff and visitors to the twelve host cities of the tournament. At the UEFA Congress in early March, UEFA president Aleksander Čeferin said the organisation was confident that the situation could be dealt with, while general secretary Theodore Theodoridis stated that UEFA was maintaining contact with the World Health Organization and national governments regarding the coronavirus. The impact on football grew later that month, as numerous domestic and UEFA competition matches began taking place behind closed doors. By 13 March 2020, upcoming UEFA competition fixtures were postponed, while major European leagues were suspended, including the Bundesliga, La Liga, Ligue 1, Premier League, and Serie A.

UEFA held a videoconference on 17 March 2020 with representatives of its 55 member associations, along with a FIFPro representative and the boards of the European Club Association and European Leagues, to discuss the response to the outbreak for domestic and European competitions, including Euro 2020. At the meeting, UEFA announced that the tournament would be postponed to the following year, proposing that it take place from 11 June to 11 July 2021. The postponement allowed for pressure to be reduced on the public services in affected countries, while also providing space in the calendar for domestic European leagues that had been suspended to complete their seasons. On the following day, the Bureau of the FIFA Council approved the date change in the FIFA International Match Calendar. As a result, the expanded FIFA Club World Cup, due to take place in June and July 2021, was cancelled. On 23 April 2020, UEFA confirmed that the tournament would still be known as UEFA Euro 2020.

=== Spectator plans and venue changes ===
In May 2020, Čeferin stated that in principle the tournament would take place in the twelve selected host cities. However, he did not rule out the possibility of reducing the number of cities, as three hosts were unsure if matches could be held under the new schedule. The tournament venues and match schedule was reviewed by the UEFA Executive Committee during their meeting on 17 June 2020. At the meeting, UEFA confirmed that all twelve original host venues would remain as hosts for the tournament in 2021, and approved the revised match schedule. However, Čeferin stated in October 2020 that it was still possible that the tournament could be played in fewer than the planned twelve host countries. The following month, UEFA stated that it "intends to hold Euro 2020 in the format and the venues confirmed earlier this year and we are working closely with all host cities on preparations". It was also announced that each host was discussing with UEFA and local health authorities on whether the venue could host matches at full capacity, between 100% and 50% capacity, at 33% capacity or behind closed doors. Each host city was asked to draw up two or three plans from the four options. The restrictions could also involve only local spectators to be permitted at matches. A final decision on which scenario would be applied individually at each venue was originally to be made on 5 March 2021. In October 2020, it was announced that UEFA matches would be suspended from taking place in Armenia and Azerbaijan until further notice due to the 2020 Nagorno-Karabakh war. However, this did not affect the planning of Euro 2020 matches to be held in Baku. This restriction was lifted in December 2020 following a ceasefire agreement between the countries.

In a New Year's interview, Čeferin said, "Vaccination has started and I think we will be able to have full stands in the summer. For now, the plan is to play in all twelve countries. Of course, there are backup options in case a country has a problem. We are ready to organise competitions in eleven, ten or nine cities... and even only in one country, if necessary. However, I am 99.9 percent sure that we will have the European Championship in all twelve cities, as planned." On 27 January 2021, UEFA met with the host associations to discuss operational matters, and reaffirmed the tournament would be held across twelve cities. The deadline for hosts to submit their venue capacity plans was moved to 7 April 2021, with a final decision on host cities and spectators to originally be made by the UEFA Executive Committee on 19 April 2021. UEFA announced on the following day that Daniel Koch, the former head of communicable diseases at Switzerland's Federal Office of Public Health, would serve as the tournament's medical advisor on matters related to the COVID-19 pandemic. In February 2021, the Israel Football Association offered to stage some tournament matches in the country, which had a high rate of vaccination. However, this was turned down by UEFA, who reiterated their commitment to the twelve host cities. In a March 2021 interview, Čeferin said, "We have several scenarios, but the one guarantee we can make is that the option of playing any Euro 2020 match in an empty stadium is off the table. Every host must guarantee there will be fans at their games." UEFA subsequently stated that no host city would be automatically dropped should they decide to play matches behind closed doors. However, UEFA would need to consider whether it would make sense to play matches without spectators, or if these matches should be reallocated to other venues. That same month, British prime minister Boris Johnson offered UEFA to host additional tournament matches in England should any venues need to be reassigned.

On 9 April 2021, UEFA announced that eight of the original twelve tournament hosts confirmed their spectator plans, with stadium capacities ranging from 25% to 100%. Only Bilbao, Dublin, Munich and Rome had yet to submit their plans, with each host originally given an extension until 19 April 2021 to submit their venue capacities. On 14 April, UEFA announced that Rome had guaranteed spectators for the tournament, and was therefore confirmed as a venue. On 19 April, it was announced that another extension was given to the three remaining hosts until 23 April, when UEFA would make its final decision. Due to the need to finalise ticketing details, host cities would have until 28 April to decide on whether to leave their spectator limits unchanged, or to upscale their allowed capacities.

On 23 April, UEFA announced that Seville would replace Bilbao as tournament host, while the matches of Dublin would be reallocated to Saint Petersburg for the group stage and London for the round of 16. Due to the COVID-19 pandemic in the Republic of Ireland, the Football Association of Ireland was unable to receive assurances from the Government of Ireland and the Dublin City Council to allow spectators into the stadium. Meanwhile, the Royal Spanish Football Federation (RFEF) said the sanitary conditions imposed by the Basque Government to host matches in Bilbao were "impossible to comply with", and thus would not allow for spectators to be present. After being removed as hosts, the Bilbao City Council stated they held UEFA and RFEF "directly responsible for us not staging this sporting event and the unilateral cancellation of our contractual relationships", and threatened legal action for financial compensation.

Also on 23 April, UEFA announced that local authorities had guaranteed "a minimum of 14,500 spectators" for the matches scheduled in Munich, which was therefore confirmed as host of four games. However, both the regional government of Bavaria and the German interior ministry subsequently reiterated their position that there was no such guarantee, and admittance of spectators would depend on the actual pandemic situation at the time of the tournament. A few days later, UEFA president Čeferin backtracked in an interview with a German newspaper, denying that UEFA had demanded guarantees for games with spectators, and conceding that "the local authorities will decide before the games whether spectators will be admitted or not."

=== Semi-final and final venue ===
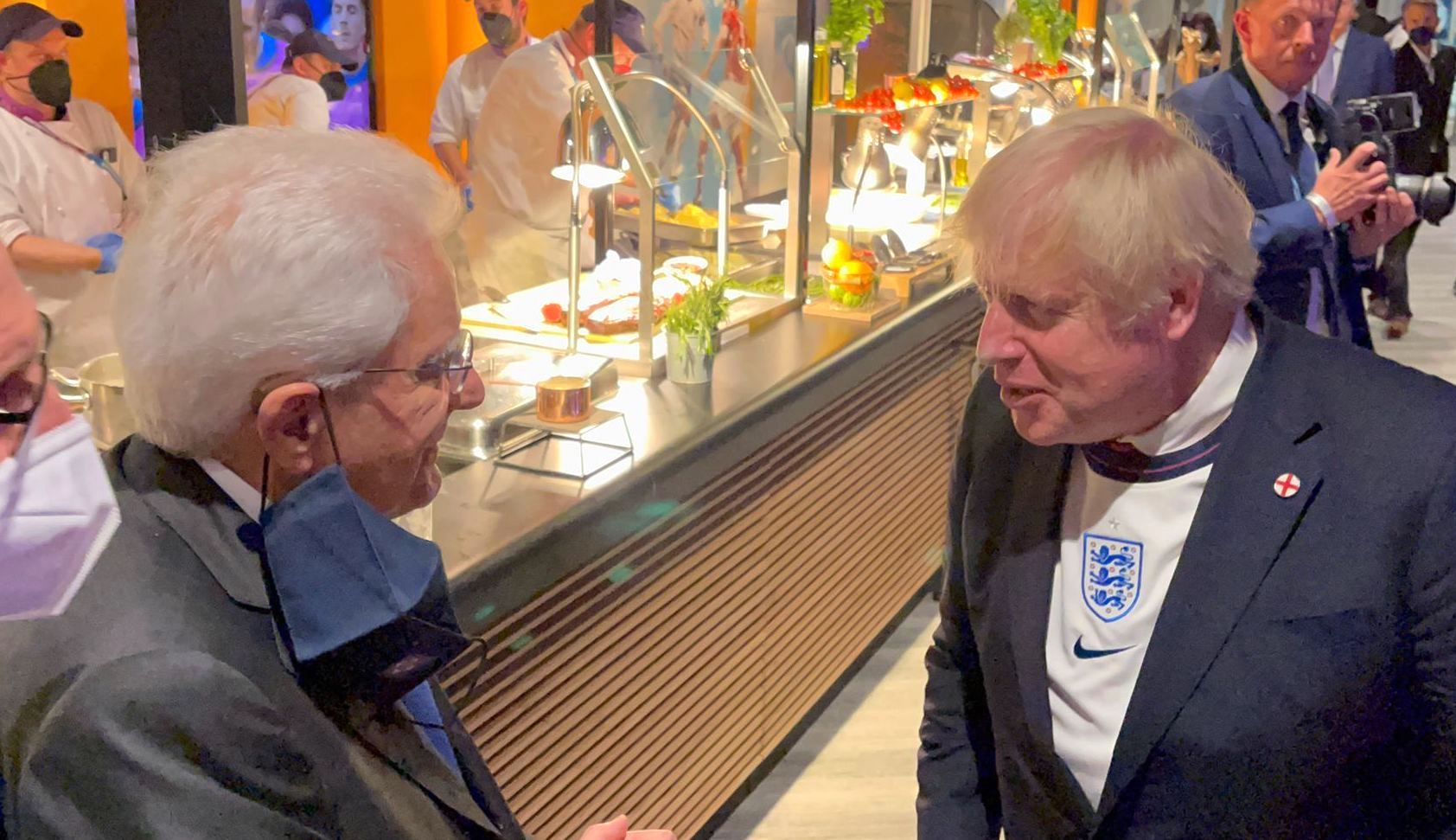
Italian President Sergio Mattarella speaks with the UK Prime Minister Boris Johnson before the final

Wembley Stadium's hosting of both the semi-finals and the final was threatened over quarantine restrictions in the United Kingdom that fans and 2,500 VIPs would be subject to. The Puskás Aréna in Budapest was considered as an alternative venue, as Hungary would have no entry restrictions for travel within the Schengen Area and could host the matches at full capacity. A spokesman for the Hungarian Football Federation said the organisation was "ready to host any high-level football event". However, UEFA remained confident that Wembley could host the final, as the organisation and the UK government discussed quarantine exemptions, but did not rule out a change in venue. Minister Kit Malthouse said the government was doing "as much as we possibly can" to host the final, while prime minister Boris Johnson stated they would try to make "sensible accommodations" for UEFA while still prioritising public health. Italian Prime Minister Mario Draghi said the final should be held in Rome due to rising COVID-19 cases in the United Kingdom. The following week, it was reported that officials and executives travelling for the matches would not need to self-isolate, though they would be subject to restrictions and required to remain in "football bubbles".

=== Rule changes ===
On 31 March 2021, the UEFA Executive Committee approved the use of a maximum of five substitutions in matches at the tournament (with a sixth allowed in extra time). However, each team are only given three opportunities to make substitutions, with a fourth opportunity allowed in extra time, excluding substitutions made at half-time, before the start of extra time and at half-time in extra time. The use of five substitutes has been permitted by IFAB during the COVID-19 pandemic due to the resulting fixture congestion, which has created a greater burden on players.

At the start of April 2021, UEFA also said they were considering allowing tournament squads to be expanded from the usual 23 players, following calls from national team managers in case of a possible COVID outbreak in a team, as well as to reduce player fatigue caused by the fixture congestion of the prior season. On 27 April, it was reported that the UEFA National Team Competitions Committee had approved the expansion of squads to 26 players, subject to confirmation by the UEFA Executive Committee. On 4 May 2021, the executive committee confirmed the use of 26-player squads. However, teams still may only name a maximum of 23 players on the match sheet for each tournament fixture (of which 12 are substitutes), in line with the Laws of the Game. These 23 must include three goalkeepers. It was also announced that after each team's first match, goalkeepers may still be replaced due to physical incapacity, even if the other goalkeepers from the squad are still available.

Water breaks were permitted so that players could drink from their own personal bottles. Cooling breaks, first seen at the 2014 FIFA World Cup were also permitted for games played in higher temperatures.

=== Special rules due to COVID-19 ===
On 4 May 2021, the UEFA Executive Committee approved special rules for the final tournament due to the COVID-19 pandemic in Europe:

- If a group of players of a team were placed into mandatory quarantine or self-isolation following a decision from national or local health officials due to positive SARS-CoV-2 tests, the match would go ahead as scheduled as long as the team had at least 13 players available (including at least one goalkeeper). If fewer than 13 players were available (including at least one goalkeeper), additional players could have been called up to meet the minimum of 13 players required. In such a case, an equivalent number of quarantined players had to have been definitively withdrawn from the 26-player list.
- If a team could not field the minimum required number of players due to positive SARS-CoV-2 tests, the match could have been rescheduled within the next 48 hours of the original date of the match by the UEFA administration, subject to viable rescheduling options being available. Additionally, UEFA could have reassigned the rescheduled match to an alternative venue if deemed appropriate.
- If the match could not be rescheduled, the UEFA Control, Ethics and Disciplinary Body would have decided on the matter. The team responsible for the match not taking place would have been considered to have forfeited the match and would have lost 3–0.
- If any member of the appointed referee team had to be replaced due to a positive SARS-CoV-2 test, UEFA could have exceptionally appointed a match official of the same nationality as one of the teams or not on the FIFA list.

== Qualification ==
Team qualified for UEFA Euro 2020 Team failed to qualify

There was no automatic qualifying berth, and all 55 UEFA national teams, including the twelve national teams whose countries were selected to stage matches, had to compete in the qualifiers for the 24 places at the finals tournament. As the host cities were appointed by UEFA in September 2014, before the qualifiers, it was possible for the national teams from the host cities to fail to qualify for the finals tournament. The qualifying draw was held on 2 December 2018 at the Convention Centre Dublin in Dublin, Ireland.

The main qualifying process started in March 2019, instead of immediately in September 2018 following the 2018 FIFA World Cup, and ended in November 2019. The format remained largely the same, although only 20 of the 24 spots for the finals tournament were decided from the main qualifying process, leaving four spots still to be decided. Following the admission of Kosovo to UEFA in May 2016, it was announced that the 55 members at the time would be drawn into ten groups after the completion of the UEFA Nations League (five groups of five teams and five groups of six teams, with the four participants of the UEFA Nations League Finals guaranteed to be drawn into groups of five teams), with the top two teams in each group qualifying. The qualifiers were played on double matchdays in March, June, September, October and November 2019.

With the creation of the UEFA Nations League starting in 2018, the 2018–19 UEFA Nations League was linked with Euro qualifying, providing teams another chance to qualify for the tournament. Four teams from each division that had not already qualified for the European Championship competed in the play-offs for each division. The winners of the play-offs for each division, which were decided by two one-off semi-finals (the best-ranked team vs. the lowest-ranked team, and the second-best-ranked team vs. the third-best-ranked team, played at home of higher-ranked teams) and a one-off final (with the venue drawn in advance between the two semi-finals winners), joined the 20 teams that had already qualified for the tournament.

=== Qualified teams ===
Of the 24 teams that qualified for the tournament, 19 were returning from the 2016 edition. Among them were Belgium and Italy, who both had recorded flawless qualifying campaigns (ten wins in ten matches), defending European champions Portugal and world champions France, with Germany also qualifying for a record 13th straight European Championship. Finland and North Macedonia made their European Championship debuts, having never previously qualified for a major tournament. Scotland, a co-host of the tournament, qualified for their first major international tournament since the 1998 FIFA World Cup, and their first European Championship since 1996. The Netherlands and Denmark returned after missing out in 2016, with the Dutch featuring in a major tournament for the first time since the 2014 FIFA World Cup. For the first time, Austria, Hungary, Slovakia, and Wales reached successive European Championship tournaments. Greece, winners in 2004, were the only former champions that failed to qualify, missing their second straight European Championship and third consecutive major tournament. Albania, Iceland, Northern Ireland, the Republic of Ireland, and Romania failed to qualify after appearing in the 2016 finals.

Nine out of eleven host countries managed to qualify for the final tournament. Denmark, England, Germany, Italy, the Netherlands, Russia, and Spain all qualified directly, while Hungary and Scotland qualified only after winning their respective play-off path. Azerbaijan and Romania failed to qualify, with Azerbaijan failing to qualify from the group stage and Romania losing in the play-off. The Republic of Ireland, one of the original host countries, also failed to qualify for the tournament after losing in the play-offs as well. UEFA later announced with just two months to go before the tournament started, that Ireland was also stripped of their hosting duties, after another COVID-19 pandemic wave struck the country, killing over a thousand people in early 2021.

As of 2026, this was the last time that Russia (Note: Since February 2022, FIFA and UEFA have indefinitely suspended Russia from all international competitions following its invasion of Ukraine. This resulted in the national team's disqualification from the 2022 FIFA World Cup and a ban from participating in future qualifying cycles for both the FIFA World Cup and the UEFA European Championship, including exclusion from UEFA Euro 2024 and the 2026 FIFA World Cup.) qualified for either the World Cup or European Championship finals, and the last time Sweden and Wales has qualified for a European Championship finals. It was also the only time Finland and North Macedonia qualified and the last time Albania, Georgia, Romania, Serbia and Slovenia failed to qualify.

Team (Note: Italic indicates team from one of the eleven host associations.)	Qualified as	Qualified on	Previous appearances in tournament (Note: Bold indicates champion for that year. Italic indicates host for that year.)
Belgium	Group I winner	10 October 2019	5 (1972, 1980, 1984, 2000, 2016)
Italy	Group J winner	12 October 2019	9 (**1968**, 1980, 1988, 1996, 2000, 2004, 2008, 2012, 2016)
Russia (Note: From 1960 to 1988, Russia competed as the Soviet Union, and in 1992 as CIS.)	Group I runner-up	13 October 2019	11 (**1960**, 1964, 1968, 1972, 1988, 1992, 1996, 2004, 2008, 2012, 2016)
Poland	Group G winner	13 October 2019	3 (2008, 2012, 2016)
Ukraine	Group B winner	14 October 2019	2 (2012, 2016)
Spain	Group F winner	15 October 2019	10 (**1964**, 1980, 1984, 1988, 1996, 2000, 2004, **2008**, **2012**, 2016)
France	Group H winner	14 November 2019	9 (1960, **1984**, 1992, 1996, **2000**, 2004, 2008, 2012, 2016)
Turkey	Group H runner-up	14 November 2019	4 (1996, 2000, 2008, 2016)
England	Group A winner	14 November 2019	9 (1968, 1980, 1988, 1992, 1996, 2000, 2004, 2012, 2016)
Czech Republic (Note: From 1960 to 1980, both the Czech Republic and Slovakia competed as Czechoslovakia.)	Group A runner-up	14 November 2019	9 (1960, **1976**, 1980, 1996, 2000, 2004, 2008, 2012, 2016)
Finland	Group J runner-up	15 November 2019	0 (debut)
Sweden	Group F runner-up	15 November 2019	6 (1992, 2000, 2004, 2008, 2012, 2016)
Croatia	Group E winner	16 November 2019	5 (1996, 2004, 2008, 2012, 2016)
Austria	Group G runner-up	16 November 2019	2 (2008, 2016)
Netherlands	Group C runner-up	16 November 2019	9 (1976, 1980, **1988**, 1992, 1996, 2000, 2004, 2008, 2012)
Germany (Note: From 1972 to 1988, Germany competed as West Germany.)	Group C winner	16 November 2019	12 (**1972**, 1976, **1980**, 1984, 1988, 1992, **1996**, 2000, 2004, 2008, 2012, 2016)
Portugal	Group B runner-up	17 November 2019	7 (1984, 1996, 2000, 2004, 2008, 2012, **2016**)
Switzerland	Group D winner	18 November 2019	4 (1996, 2004, 2008, 2016)
Denmark	Group D runner-up	18 November 2019	8 (1964, 1984, 1988, **1992**, 1996, 2000, 2004, 2012)
Wales	Group E runner-up	19 November 2019	1 (2016)
North Macedonia	Play-off Path D winner	12 November 2020	0 (debut)
Hungary	Play-off Path A winner	12 November 2020	3 (1964, 1972, 2016)
Slovakia	Play-off Path B winner	12 November 2020	4 (1960, **1976**, 1980, 2016)
Scotland	Play-off Path C winner	12 November 2020	2 (1992, 1996)

== Venues ==
The 13 original venues were selected and announced by UEFA on 19 September 2014. However, the UEFA Executive Committee removed Brussels as a host city on 7 December 2017 due to delays with the building of Eurostadium. The four matches (three group stage, one round of 16) initially scheduled to be held in Brussels were reallocated to Wembley Stadium in London. On 23 April 2021, UEFA announced that due to a lack of guarantees regarding spectators caused by the COVID-19 pandemic, Aviva Stadium in Dublin was removed as a tournament host. Their four matches were reallocated to Krestovsky Stadium in Saint Petersburg for the three group stage matches, and Wembley Stadium in London for the round of 16 fixture. Similarly, UEFA reassigned the four matches in Spain elsewhere in the country, with Estadio de La Cartuja in Seville replacing Estadio de San Mamés in Bilbao.

On 7 December 2017, it was also announced that the opening match would take place at the Stadio Olimpico in Rome, chosen ahead of Amsterdam, Glasgow and Saint Petersburg. UEFA decided that the opening match would feature Italy if they qualified.

Of the eleven selected cities and countries, seven cities and six countries had never hosted a European Championship finals match before. Seville was not a venue when Spain hosted the 1964 European Nations' Cup, and none of Azerbaijan, Denmark, Hungary, Romania, Russia or Scotland had hosted the tournament previously. Of the eleven selected stadiums, only two had hosted a European Championship match before: the Stadio Olimpico (1968 and 1980) and the Johan Cruyff Arena (2000). The original Wembley stadium hosted games and the final in UEFA Euro 1996, but although it stood on the same site, this was classified as a different stadium to the current Wembley Stadium.

(England) London	(Italy) Rome	Location of the host cities of the UEFA Euro 2020.		(Germany) Munich
Wembley Stadium	Stadio Olimpico	Location of the host cities of the UEFA Euro 2020.		Allianz Arena
Capacity: 90,000	Capacity: 70,634	Location of the host cities of the UEFA Euro 2020.		Capacity: 70,000
(Azerbaijan) Baku	(Russia) Saint Petersburg	Location of the host cities of the UEFA Euro 2020.		(Hungary) Budapest
Olympic Stadium	Krestovsky Stadium	Location of the host cities of the UEFA Euro 2020.		Puskás Aréna
Capacity: 68,000	Capacity: 68,134	Location of the host cities of the UEFA Euro 2020.		Capacity: 67,215
(Spain) Seville	(Romania) Bucharest	(Netherlands) Amsterdam	(Scotland) Glasgow	(Denmark) Copenhagen
Estadio de La Cartuja	Arena Națională	Johan Cruyff Arena	Hampden Park	Parken Stadium
Capacity: 57,600	Capacity: 55,600	Capacity: 54,990	Capacity: 51,866	Capacity: 38,065

Each city hosted three group stage matches and one match in the round of 16 or quarter-finals, with the exception of Saint Petersburg, which hosted six group stage matches, and London, which hosted two matches in the round of 16. The match allocation for the eleven stadiums is as follows:

- Group stage, round of 16, semi-finals and final: London (England)
- Group stage and quarter-finals: Baku (Azerbaijan), Munich (Germany), Rome (Italy), Saint Petersburg (Russia)
- Group stage and round of 16: Amsterdam (Netherlands), Bucharest (Romania), Budapest (Hungary), Copenhagen (Denmark), Glasgow (Scotland), Seville (Spain)

=== Group stage hosts ===
The host cities were divided into six pairings, established on the basis of sporting strength (assuming all host teams qualify), geographical considerations and security/political constraints. The pairings were allocated to groups by means of a random draw on 7 December 2017. Each qualified host country played a minimum of two matches at home. The following group venue pairings were announced:

- Group A: Rome (Italy) and Baku (Azerbaijan)
- Group B: Saint Petersburg (Russia) and Copenhagen (Denmark)
- Group C: Amsterdam (Netherlands) and Bucharest (Romania)
- Group D: London (England) and Glasgow (Scotland)
- Group E: Originally Bilbao (Spain) and Dublin (Republic of Ireland)
  - Later changed to Seville (Spain) and Saint Petersburg (Russia) (Note: In April 2021, Dublin was removed as a tournament host, with their group stage matches reallocated to Saint Petersburg, who were already hosts of Group B.)
- Group F: Munich (Germany) and Budapest (Hungary)

The following criteria applied to define the home matches of host teams within the same group:

- If both host teams qualified directly or both advanced to the play-offs, a draw determined which team would host the head to head match between both sides.
- If one host team qualified directly, and the other failed to also directly qualify, the directly qualified host team would win hosting rights for the head to head match against the other team (if that team qualified through the playoffs).
- If one host team advanced to the play-offs, and the other failed to qualify completely, the host team would win hosting rights for the head to head match between both teams if they qualified through the playoffs.
- No action was necessary if both host teams failed to qualify directly or reach the playoffs.

If a host team in the play-offs failed to qualify, the path winner would take the spot of the host in the match schedule and therefore would play the two or three matches based on the above criteria in the host city of the respective host that failed to qualify. The draw took place on 22 November 2019, 12:00 CET, at the UEFA headquarters in Nyon, Switzerland (along with the draw for the play-offs). In the draw, which was only necessary for Group B (Denmark and Russia), two balls were prepared, with the first drawn hosting the three matches.

Allocation of group stage home matches to host countries
Group	Host	Status of host	Draw	Number of home matches	
Group	Host	Status of host	Draw	Three	Two
A	Azerbaijan	Eliminated in qualifying group stage	No	Italy	None
A	Italy	Qualified directly to finals	No	Italy	None
B	Denmark	Qualified directly to finals	Yes	Denmark	Russia
B	Russia	Qualified directly to finals	Yes	Denmark	Russia
C	Netherlands	Qualified directly to finals	No	Netherlands	None
C	Romania	Eliminated via play-offs	No	Netherlands	None
D	England	Qualified directly to finals	No	England	Scotland
D	Scotland	Qualified via play-offs	No	England	Scotland
E	~~Republic of Ireland~~	Eliminated via play-offs	No	Spain	None
E	Spain	Qualified directly to finals	No	Spain	None
F	Germany	Qualified directly to finals	No	Germany	Hungary
F	Hungary	Qualified via play-offs	No	Germany	Hungary

=== Spectator limits ===
Due to the COVID-19 pandemic and the resulting restrictions on public gatherings, many of the venues at the tournament were unable to operate at full capacity. UEFA asked each host to devise a spectator plan in conjunction with their local/national government and health authorities. The hosts were given a deadline of 7 April 2021 to communicate their plans with UEFA. On 9 April, UEFA announced that eight of the tournament hosts had confirmed their stadium capacities, ranging from 25% to 100%. The remaining four hosts (Bilbao, Dublin, Munich and Rome) were given an extension until 23 April to submit their venue capacities. On 14 April, UEFA announced that Rome had also confirmed its venue capacity. On 23 April, the venue capacity for Munich was also confirmed, while Bilbao was replaced by Seville, which could guarantee spectators. In addition, Dublin was removed as a host, as it was unable to ensure spectators could attend.

Many of the matches did not see stadiums filled to their allowed capacity, with only Netherlands group stage matches that were played at the Johan Cruyff Arena seeing the stadium come within less than a thousand seats of being full. The match between England and Croatia saw an attendance of 18,497, compared to the allowed capacity of 22,500, with UEFA suggesting quarantine restrictions as the cause for the smaller attendance.

Allowed capacities of UEFA Euro 2020 venues
City	Venue	Standard capacity	Allowed capacity
Amsterdam	Johan Cruyff Arena	54,990	At least 33% (approximately 16,000), subject to possible increase
Baku	Olympic Stadium	68,700	50% (approximately 34,350), with no foreign spectators permitted other than citizens of participating teams
Bucharest	Arena Națională	55,600	At least 25% (approximately 13,000) for the group stage and 50% (approximately 25,000) for the round of 16 match
Budapest	Puskás Aréna	67,215	Full capacity, subject to spectators fulfilling strict stadium entry requirements
Copenhagen	Parken Stadium	38,065	40% (approximately 15,900) for the first match against Finland and 67% (approximately 25,000) for the remaining two group stage matches and the round of 16 match.
Glasgow	Hampden Park	51,866	25% (approximately 12,000)
London	Wembley Stadium	90,000	25% (approximately 22,500) for the group stage and the first match in the round of 16, 50% (approximately 45,000) for the second match in the round of 16 and 67% (approximately 60,000) for the semi-finals and final
Munich	Allianz Arena	70,000	20% (14,000)
Rome	Stadio Olimpico	70,634	At least 25% (approximately 17,659), subject to possible increase
Saint Petersburg	Krestovsky Stadium	68,134	At least 50% (approximately 34,067), subject to possible increase
Seville	Estadio de La Cartuja	60,000	30% (approximately 18,000)

=== Team base camps ===
Each team chose a "team base camp" for its stay between the matches. The teams trained and resided in these locations throughout the tournament, travelling to games staged away from their bases. Unlike previous tournaments, each team could set up their base camp anywhere due to the pan-European format, without any obligation of staying in any of the host countries.

The base camps selected by the 20 directly qualified teams were announced by UEFA on 27 January 2020. The base camps of the remaining teams qualified via the play-offs were announced in 2021.

Team	Base camp
Austria	Seefeld in Tirol, Austria
Belgium	Tubize, Belgium
Croatia	Rovinj, Croatia (Note: Originally St Andrews, Scotland, but moved due to COVID-19 quarantine restrictions in Scotland.)
Czech Republic	Prague, Czech Republic (Note: Originally Currie, Edinburgh, Scotland, but moved due to COVID-19 quarantine restrictions in Scotland)
Denmark	Helsingør, Denmark
England	Burton upon Trent, England
Finland	Repino, Saint Petersburg, Russia
France	Clairefontaine-en-Yvelines, France
Germany	Herzogenaurach, Germany
Hungary	Telki, Hungary
Italy	Coverciano, Florence, Italy
Netherlands	Zeist, Netherlands
North Macedonia	Bucharest, Romania
Poland	Sopot, Poland (Note: Originally Portmarnock, Republic of Ireland)
Portugal	Budapest, Hungary
Russia	Novogorsk, Khimki, Russia
Scotland	Hurworth-on-Tees, England
Slovakia	Saint Petersburg, Russia (Note: Originally Castleknock, Republic of Ireland,)
Spain	Las Rozas de Madrid, Spain
Sweden	Gothenburg, Sweden (Note: Originally Maynooth, Republic of Ireland.)
Switzerland	Rome, Italy
Turkey	Baku, Azerbaijan
Ukraine	Bucharest, Romania
Wales	Baku, Azerbaijan

== Final draw ==
The draw for the final tournament was held on 30 November 2019, 18:00 CET (19:00 local time, EET) at Romexpo in Bucharest, Romania. The 24 teams were drawn into six groups of four. The identity of the four play-off teams were not known at the time of the draw and were identified as play-off winners A to D. Should there have been groups that could not be finalised at the time of the final tournament draw, another draw would have been held after the play-offs on 1 April 2020, but UEFA confirmed the additional draw was not necessary after the identity of the 20 directly qualified teams and the 16 play-offs teams was known.

The teams were seeded in accordance with the European Qualifiers overall ranking based on their results in UEFA Euro 2020 qualifying. The following was the standard composition of the draw pots:

- Pot 1: Group winners ranked 1–6
- Pot 2: Group winners ranked 7–10, group runners-up ranked 1–2 (11–12 overall)
- Pot 3: Group runners-up ranked 3–8 (13–18 overall)
- Pot 4: Group runners-up ranked 9–10 (19–20 overall), play-off winners A–D (identity unknown at the time of the draw)

As two host teams from the same group could not be in the same seeding pot, the UEFA Emergency Panel would have either switched one host team with the lowest-ranked team of the higher pot, or switched one host team with the highest-ranked team of the lower pot (based on the principle that the move would have minimal impact on the original seeding). However, no seeding adjustments were necessary.

The draw started with Pot 1 and completed with Pot 4, from where a team was drawn and assigned to the first available group. The position in the group (for the determination of the match schedule) was then drawn. In the draw, the following conditions applied (including for teams that could still qualify via the play-offs):

- Automatic group assignments: Host teams were automatically assigned to their group based on the host city pairings.
- Prohibited clashes: For political reasons, UEFA set pairs of teams that were considered prohibited clashes. In addition to being unable to be drawn into the same group, non-host teams were prevented from being drawn into a group hosted by a country they clash with, even should the host not qualify. Only one prohibited clash, Russia / Ukraine, applied during the group stage draw. Other prohibited clashes among qualified and play-off teams were Kosovo / Bosnia and Herzegovina and Kosovo / Serbia, but the teams in these pairs were all in the play-offs and in Pot 4 for the draw, and would not be in the same group; Kosovo / Russia was also prohibited, but they also would not be in the same group due to play-off path pairings necessary for host allocation. However, these prohibited clashes would not be excluded for the knockout stage.

=== Play-off path group allocation ===
Due to the format of the play-offs, which made anticipating all possible scenarios impossible, the UEFA administration had to wait to solve issues relating to the final tournament draw until the completion of the qualifying group stage. It was not possible for UEFA to prevent one of the play-off paths from containing two host teams, resulting in Romania (Group C hosts) and Hungary (Group F hosts) being drawn together in Path A. Therefore, the winner of this play-off path needed to be assigned two groups in the final tournament draw. To allow for this, Path A was paired with Path D (which does not contain a host), therefore providing a clear scenario for each possible qualified team. A draw took place on 22 November 2019, 12:00 CET, at the UEFA headquarters in Nyon, Switzerland (along with the play-offs draw), which decided on the order of priority for the allocation of Path A to the final tournament groups.

Two balls were prepared containing the names of the two groups hosted by the teams in question (Group C and Group F for Romania and Hungary, respectively). The first ball drawn determined the group ("priority group") that was allocated to Path A, except for the host team of the second ball drawn ("non-priority group") winning Path A. In the draw, Group F was selected as the priority group, resulting in the following possible outcomes:

- Romania don't win Path A: The winner of Path A would enter Group F, and the winner of Path D would enter Group C. (As Romania lost in the semi-finals of the play-offs, this was the resulting group assignment.)
- Romania win Path A: Romania would enter Group C, and the winner of Path D would enter Group F.

=== Seeding ===
The following was the composition of the pots, with teams divided and seeded as per their European Qualifiers overall ranking:

Pot 1
Team	Host	Rank
Belgium (Note: Ukraine could not be drawn into the same group as Russia (Group B host). Since they also could not be drawn into any of the other four groups with Pot 1 hosts, Ukraine were assigned to Group C. Consequently, Belgium were assigned to Group B.)		1
Italy	Group A	2
England	Group D	3
Germany	Group F	4
Spain	Group E	5
Ukraine		6

Pot 2
Team	Host	Rank
France		7
Poland		8
Switzerland		9
Croatia		10
Netherlands	Group C	11
Russia	Group B	12

Pot 3
Team	Host	Rank
Portugal		13
Turkey		14
Denmark	Group B	15
Austria		16
Sweden		17
Czech Republic		18

Pot 4 (Note: Identity of the four play-off winners was unknown at the time of the draw.)
Team	Host	Rank
Wales		19
Finland		20
Play-off winner A	Group C & F (Note: Romania (Group C host) and Hungary (Group F host) competed in play-off Path A, and thus the winner of Path A was assigned to two groups (Group C and Group F), with the final assignment depending on the identity of the Path A winner.)	—N/a
Play-off winner B	Group E (Note: Republic of Ireland (original Group E host) competed in play-off Path B, and thus the winner of Path B was assigned to Group E.)	—N/a
Play-off winner C	Group D (Note: Scotland (Group D host) competed in play-off Path C, and thus the winner of Path C was assigned to Group D.)	—N/a
Play-off winner D (Note: Play-off Path D was paired with Path A (which contained two hosts), and thus the winner of Path D was assigned to two groups (Group C and Group F), with the final assignment depending on the identity of the Path A winner.)		—N/a

=== Draw results and group fixtures ===
The draw resulted in the following groups (teams in italics are play-off winners whose identity was not known at the time of the draw):

Group A
Team
Turkey
Italy
Wales
Switzerland

Group B
Team
Denmark
Finland
Belgium
Russia

Group C
Team
Netherlands
Ukraine
Austria
North Macedonia

Group D
Team
England
Croatia
Scotland
Czech Republic

Group E
Team
Spain
Sweden
Poland
Slovakia

Group F
Team
Hungary
Portugal
France
Germany

The fixtures for the group stage were decided based on the draw results, as follows:

Note: Positions for scheduling did not use the seeding pots, and instead used the draw positions, e.g. Team 4 was not necessarily the team from Pot 4 in the draw.

Group stage schedule
Matchday	Dates	Matches
Matchday 1	11–15 June 2021	1 v 2, 3 v 4
Matchday 2	16–19 June 2021	1 v 3, 2 v 4
Matchday 3	20–23 June 2021	4 v 1, 2 v 3

== Squads ==
To lessen the load on players due to the COVID-19 pandemic, and in case of an outbreak within a team, squad sizes were increased from 23 (used at every European Championship since 2004) to 26. However, the maximum number of players permitted on the match sheet for each tournament fixture remained 23. Each nation's squad, which had to include three goalkeepers, was submitted at least ten days before the opening match of the tournament (by 1 June 2021). If a player became injured or ill severely enough to prevent his participation in the tournament before his team's first match, he could be replaced by another player; however, goalkeepers could still be replaced after their team's first match due to physical incapacity.

== Match officials ==
On 27 September 2018, the UEFA Executive Committee approved the use of the video assistant referee (VAR) system for the first time at the UEFA European Championship. On 12 February 2020, UEFA and CONMEBOL signed a memorandum of understanding to enhance collaboration, including the possibility of a team of South American match officials appointed for the group stage of the tournament.

On 21 April 2021, UEFA announced the 19 refereeing teams for the tournament. This included Argentine referee Fernando Rapallini and his assistants, who were the first South American officials to be selected for the European Championship as part of UEFA's referee exchange programme with CONMEBOL. A group of Spanish officials were similarly selected for the 2021 Copa América.

A refereeing team of nine officials was appointed for each match. The team of five at the stadium consisted of a referee, two assistant referees, a fourth official and a reserve assistant referee. In addition, four video match officials were located at UEFA's headquarters in Nyon, Switzerland. This team consisted of a video assistant referee (the lead video official who was the main point of contact with the referee), an assistant video assistant referee (AVAR 1, who concentrated on following the match), an offside VAR (AVAR 2, who reviewed all potential offside situations) and a support VAR (AVAR 3, who acted in a coordination capacity). The tournament used the 2021 Laws of the Game, which came into force on 1 July but could be introduced in competitions that began immediately beforehand.

Refereeing teams
Country	Referee	Assistant referees	Matches assigned
Germany	Felix Brych	Mark Borsch; Stefan Lupp	Netherlands–Ukraine (Group C); Finland–Belgium (Group B); Belgium–Portugal (Round of 16); Ukraine–England (Quarter-finals); Italy–Spain (Semi-finals)
Germany	Daniel Siebert	Jan Seidel; Rafael Foltyn	Scotland–Czech Republic (Group D); Sweden–Slovakia (Group E); Wales–Denmark (Round of 16)
Turkey	Cüneyt Çakır	Bahattin Duran; Tarık Ongun	Hungary–Portugal (Group F); Ukraine–Austria (Group C); Croatia–Spain (Round of 16)
Spain	Carlos del Cerro Grande	Juan Carlos Yuste Jiménez; Roberto Alonso Fernández	France–Germany (Group F); Croatia–Czech Republic (Group D)
Spain	Antonio Mateu Lahoz	Pau Cebrián Devís; Roberto Díaz Pérez del Palomar	Belgium–Russia (Group B); England–Scotland (Group D); Portugal–France (Group F)
Sweden	Andreas Ekberg	Mehmet Culum; Stefan Hallberg	Austria–North Macedonia (Group C)
Israel	Orel Grinfeld	Roy Hassan; Idan Yarkoni	Netherlands–Austria (Group C)
Russia	Sergei Karasev	Igor Demeshko; Maksim Gavrilin	Italy–Switzerland (Group A); Germany–Hungary (Group F); Netherlands–Czech Republic (Round of 16)
Romania	Ovidiu Hațegan	Radu Ghinguleac; Sebastian Gheorghe	Poland–Slovakia (Group E); Italy–Wales (Group A)
Romania	István Kovács	Vasile Marinescu; Ovidiu Artene	North Macedonia–Netherlands (Group C)
Netherlands	Björn Kuipers	Sander van Roekel; Erwin Zeinstra	Denmark–Belgium (Group B); Slovakia–Spain (Group E); Czech Republic–Denmark (Quarter-finals); Italy–England (Final)
Netherlands	Danny Makkelie	Hessel Steegstra; Jan de Vries	Turkey–Italy (Group A); Finland–Russia (Group B); England–Germany (Round of 16); England–Denmark (Semi-finals)
Italy	Daniele Orsato	Alessandro Giallatini; Fabiano Preti	England–Croatia (Group D); Spain–Poland (Group E); Sweden–Ukraine (Round of 16)
Argentina	Fernando Rapallini	Juan Pablo Belatti; Diego Bonfá	Ukraine–North Macedonia (Group C); Croatia–Scotland (Group D); France–Switzerland (Round of 16)
Portugal	Artur Soares Dias	Rui Tavares; Paulo Soares	Turkey–Wales (Group A); Czech Republic–England (Group D)
England	Anthony Taylor	Gary Beswick; Adam Nunn	Denmark–Finland (Group B); Portugal–Germany (Group F); Italy–Austria (Round of 16)
England	Michael Oliver	Stuart Burt; Simon Bennett	Hungary–France (Group F); Sweden–Poland (Group E); Switzerland–Spain (Quarter-finals)
France	Clément Turpin	Nicolas Danos; Cyril Gringore	Wales–Switzerland (Group A); Russia–Denmark (Group B)
Slovenia	Slavko Vinčić	Tomaž Klančnik; Andraž Kovačič	Spain–Sweden (Group E); Switzerland–Turkey (Group A); Belgium–Italy (Quarter-finals)

In addition, UEFA announced 22 video match officials and twelve support match officials (who acted as fourth official or reserve assistant referee). This included support referee Stéphanie Frappart, the first female official at the UEFA European Championship finals.

Video match officials
Country	Video assistant referees	Offside VAR
England	Stuart Attwell; Chris Kavanagh	Lee Betts
France	Jérôme Brisard; François Letexier	Benjamin Pagès
Germany	Bastian Dankert; Christian Dingert; Marco Fritz	Christian Gittelmann
Italy	Marco Di Bello; Massimiliano Irrati; Paolo Valeri	Filippo Meli
Netherlands	Kevin Blom; Pol van Boekel	
Poland	Paweł Gil	
Portugal	João Pinheiro	
Spain	Alejandro Hernández Hernández; Juan Martínez Munuera; José María Sánchez Martínez	Íñigo Prieto López de Cerain

Support match officials
Country	Fourth official	Reserve assistant referee
Bulgaria	Georgi Kabakov	Martin Margaritov
France	Stéphanie Frappart	Mikaël Berchebru
Italy	Davide Massa	Stefano Alassio
Poland	Bartosz Frankowski	Marcin Boniek
Serbia	Srđan Jovanović	Uroš Stojković
Switzerland	Sandro Schärer	Stéphane De Almeida

== Opening ceremony ==
The opening ceremony took place at the Stadio Olimpico in Rome, Italy, on 11 June 2021 at 20:35 (CEST) prior to the first match of the tournament. Italian opera tenor Andrea Bocelli performed the song "Nessun dorma". Martin Garrix, Bono and the Edge also featured, performing the tournament's official anthem, "We Are the People". The performance was a virtual one amid the COVID-19 pandemic in Europe and was filmed at motion-control studios in London and at the Stadio Olimpico to recreate the stadium environment in 3D.

== Group stage ==
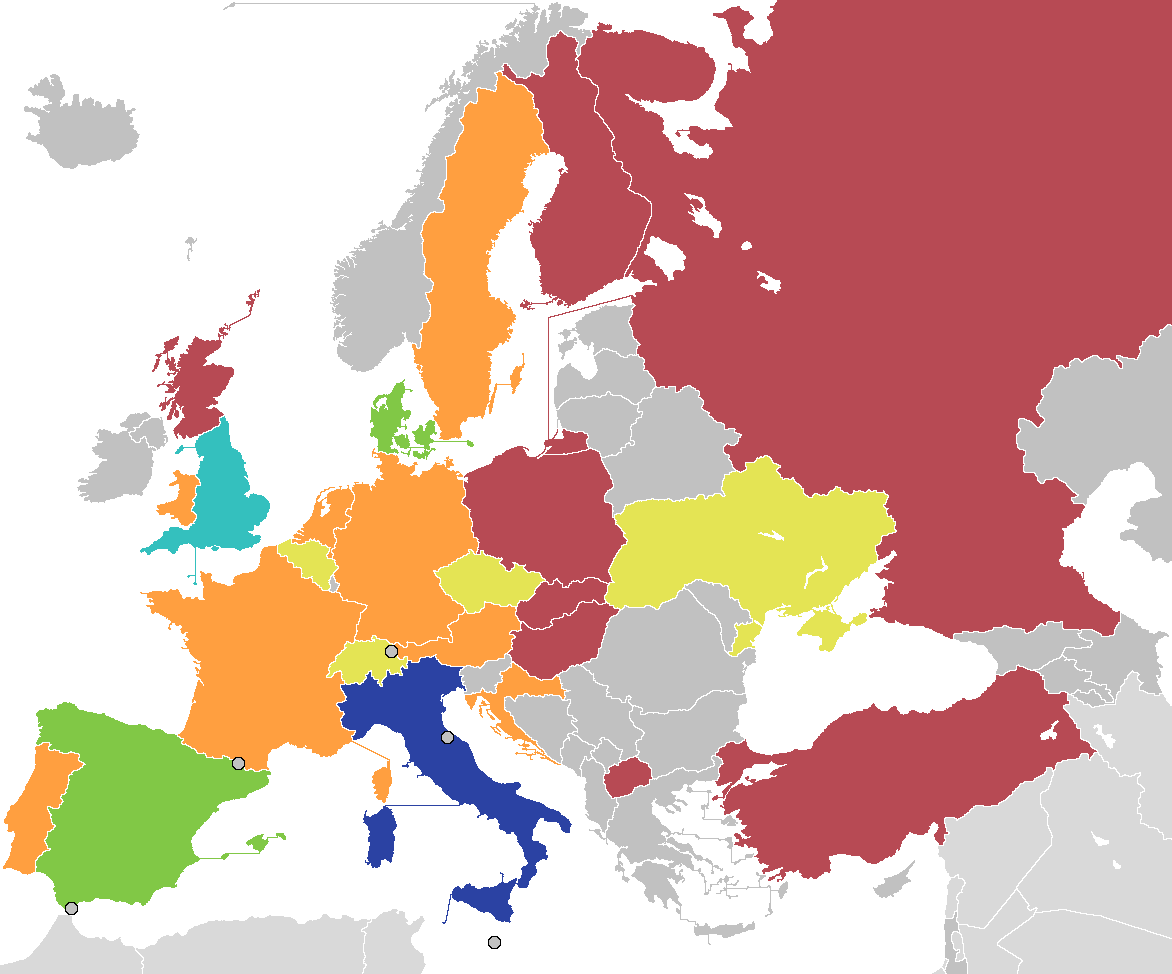
Result of teams participating in UEFA Euro 2020: Winner Runner-up / Semi-finals Quarter-finals / Round of 16 Group stage

UEFA announced the original tournament schedule on 24 May 2018, which only included kick-off times for the opening match and quarter-finals onward. The kick-off times of the remaining group stage and round of 16 matches were announced on 30 November 2019 following the final draw. On 17 June 2020, UEFA announced the revised match schedule for the tournament in 2021. All match dates, kick-off times and venues remained identical, but shifted one day earlier so matches would remain on the same day of the week (i.e. from 12 to 11 June for the opening match to remain on a Friday). On 23 April 2021, UEFA revised the venue assignments of the match schedule after one stadium was removed from the tournament and another was replaced.

Group winners, runners-up, and the best four third-placed teams advanced to the round of 16.

Times are CEST (UTC+2), as listed by UEFA. If the venue was located in a different time zone, the local time is also given.

=== Tiebreakers ===
If two or more teams were equal on points on completion of the group matches, the following tie-breaking criteria were applied:

1. Higher number of points obtained in the matches played between the teams in question;
2. Superior goal difference resulting from the matches played between the teams in question;
3. Higher number of goals scored in the matches played between the teams in question;
4. If, after having applied criteria 1 to 3, teams still had an equal ranking, criteria 1 to 3 were reapplied exclusively to the matches between the teams who were still level to determine their final rankings. (Note: If there was a three-way tie on points, the application of the first three criteria could only break the tie for one of the teams, leaving the other two teams still tied. In this case, the tiebreaking procedure was resumed, from the beginning, for the two teams that were still tied.) If this procedure did not lead to a decision, criteria 5 to 9 applied;
5. Superior goal difference in all group matches;
6. Higher number of goals scored in all group matches;
7. Higher number of wins in all group matches; (Note: This criterion could only break a tie if a point deduction were to occur, as multiple teams in the same group could not otherwise be tied on points but have a different number of wins.)
8. Lower disciplinary points total in all group matches (1 point for a single yellow card, 3 points for a red card whenever it was a straight red or two yellows, 4 points for a yellow card followed by a direct red card);
9. Higher position in the European Qualifiers overall ranking.

However, the normal tiebreaking criteria do not apply if on the last round of the group stage, two teams were facing each other and each had the same number of points, as well as the same number of goals scored and conceded, and the score finished level in their match, and no other teams have the same number of points; in that case, their ranking was determined by a penalty shoot-out.

=== Group A ===
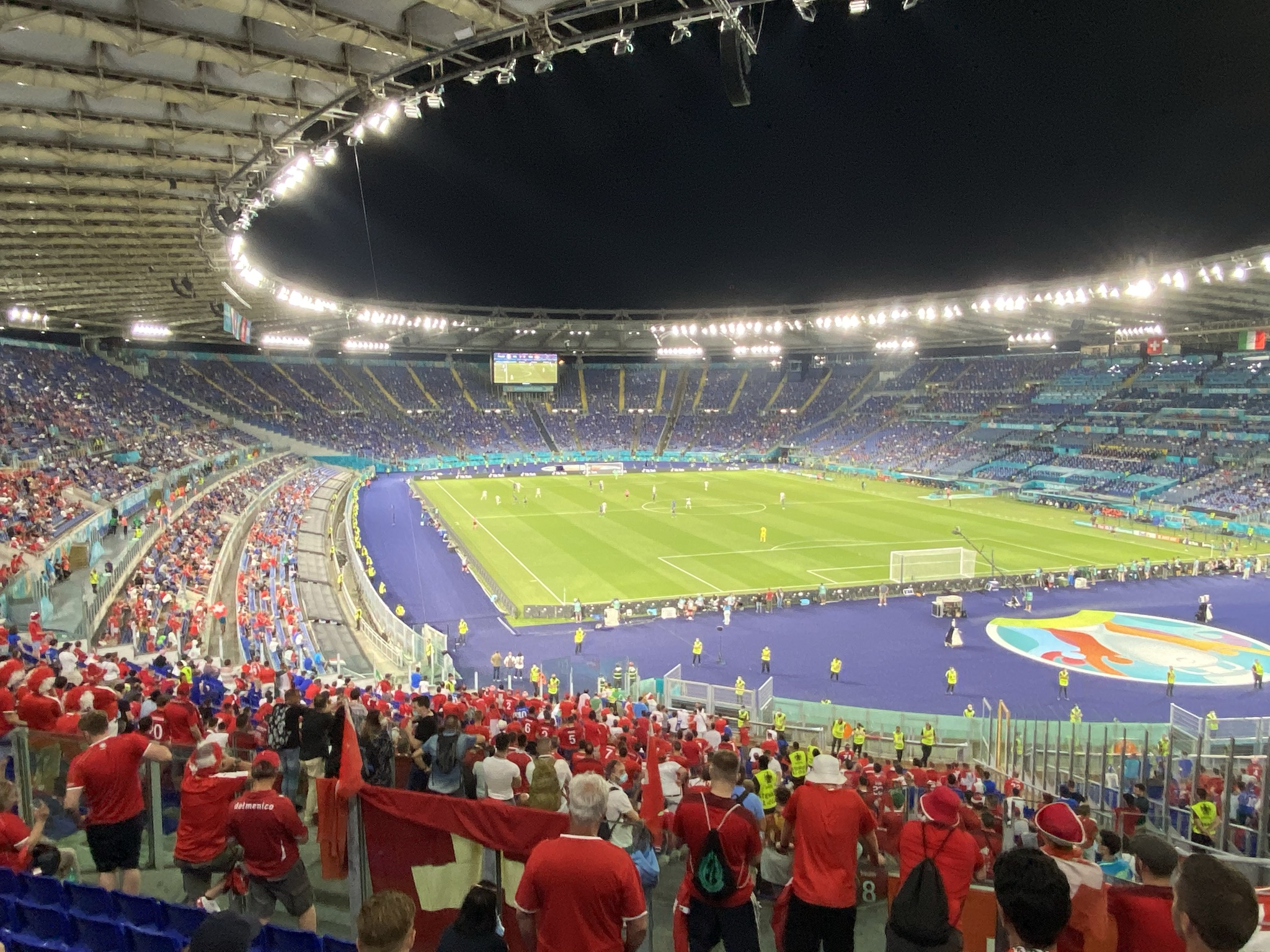
UEFA Euro 2020 match between Italy and Switzerland

Pos	Team	Pld	W	D	L	GF	GA	GD	Pts	Qualification
1	Italy (H)	3	3	0	0	7	0	+7	9	Advance to knockout stage
2	Wales	3	1	1	1	3	2	+1	4 (Note: Tied on head-to-head result (Wales 1–1 Switzerland). Overall goal difference was used as the tiebreaker.)	Advance to knockout stage
3	Switzerland	3	1	1	1	4	5	−1	4	Advance to knockout stage
4	Turkey	3	0	0	3	1	8	−7	0	

Source: UEFA
(H) Hosts
Notes:
11 June 2021
21:00

Turkey	0–3	Italy
	Report	Demiral 53' (o.g.); Immobile 66'; Insigne 79'

Stadio Olimpico, Rome
Attendance: 12,916
Referee: Danny Makkelie (Netherlands)
12 June 2021
15:00 (17:00 UTC+4)

Wales	1–1	Switzerland
Moore 74'	Report	Embolo 49'

Olympic Stadium, Baku
Attendance: 8,782
Referee: Clément Turpin (France)

16 June 2021
18:00 (20:00 UTC+4)

Turkey	0–2	Wales
	Report	Ramsey 42'; C. Roberts 90+5'

Olympic Stadium, Baku
Attendance: 19,762
Referee: Artur Soares Dias (Portugal)
16 June 2021
21:00

Italy	3–0	Switzerland
Locatelli 26', 52'; Immobile 89'	Report

Stadio Olimpico, Rome
Attendance: 12,445
Referee: Sergei Karasev (Russia)

20 June 2021
18:00 (20:00 UTC+4)

Switzerland	3–1	Turkey
Seferovic 6'; Shaqiri 26', 68'	Report	Kahveci 62'

Olympic Stadium, Baku
Attendance: 17,138
Referee: Slavko Vinčić (Slovenia)
20 June 2021
18:00

Italy	1–0	Wales
Pessina 39'	Report

Stadio Olimpico, Rome
Attendance: 11,541
Referee: Ovidiu Hațegan (Romania)

=== Group B ===
Pos	Team	Pld	W	D	L	GF	GA	GD	Pts	Qualification
1	Belgium	3	3	0	0	7	1	+6	9	Advance to knockout stage
2	Denmark (H)	3	1	0	2	5	4	+1	3 (Note: Tied on head-to-head points (3). Head-to-head goal difference: Denmark +2, Finland 0, Russia −2.)	Advance to knockout stage
3	Finland	3	1	0	2	1	3	−2	3	
4	Russia (H)	3	1	0	2	2	7	−5	3	

Source: UEFA
(H) Hosts
Notes:
12 June 2021
18:00

Denmark	0–1	Finland
	Report	Pohjanpalo 60'

Parken Stadium, Copenhagen
Attendance: 13,790
Referee: Anthony Taylor (England)
12 June 2021
21:00 (22:00 UTC+3)

Belgium	3–0	Russia
Lukaku 10', 88'; Meunier 34'	Report

Krestovsky Stadium, Saint Petersburg
Attendance: 26,264
Referee: Antonio Mateu Lahoz (Spain)

16 June 2021
15:00 (16:00 UTC+3)

Finland	0–1	Russia
	Report	Miranchuk 45+2'

Krestovsky Stadium, Saint Petersburg
Attendance: 24,540
Referee: Danny Makkelie (Netherlands)
17 June 2021
18:00

Denmark	1–2	Belgium
Poulsen 2'	Report	T. Hazard 55'; De Bruyne 70'

Parken Stadium, Copenhagen
Attendance: 23,395
Referee: Björn Kuipers (Netherlands)

21 June 2021
21:00

Russia	1–4	Denmark
Dzyuba 70' (pen.)	Report	Damsgaard 38'; Poulsen 59'; Christensen 79'; Mæhle 82'

Parken Stadium, Copenhagen
Attendance: 23,644
Referee: Clément Turpin (France)
21 June 2021
21:00 (22:00 UTC+3)

Finland	0–2	Belgium
	Report	Hradecky 74' (o.g.); Lukaku 81'

Krestovsky Stadium, Saint Petersburg
Attendance: 18,545
Referee: Felix Brych (Germany)

=== Group C ===
Pos	Team	Pld	W	D	L	GF	GA	GD	Pts	Qualification
1	Netherlands (H)	3	3	0	0	8	2	+6	9	Advance to knockout stage
2	Austria	3	2	0	1	4	3	+1	6	Advance to knockout stage
3	Ukraine	3	1	0	2	4	5	−1	3	Advance to knockout stage
4	North Macedonia	3	0	0	3	2	8	−6	0	

Source: UEFA
(H) Hosts
13 June 2021
18:00 (19:00 UTC+3)

Austria	3–1	North Macedonia
Lainer 18'; Gregoritsch 78'; Arnautović 89'	Report	Pandev 28'

Arena Națională, Bucharest
Attendance: 9,082
Referee: Andreas Ekberg (Sweden)
13 June 2021
21:00

Netherlands	3–2	Ukraine
Wijnaldum 52'; Weghorst 58'; Dumfries 85'	Report	Yarmolenko 75'; Yaremchuk 79'

Johan Cruyff Arena, Amsterdam
Attendance: 15,837
Referee: Felix Brych (Germany)

17 June 2021
15:00 (16:00 UTC+3)

Ukraine	2–1	North Macedonia
Yarmolenko 29'; Yaremchuk 34'	Report	Alioski 57'

Arena Națională, Bucharest
Attendance: 10,001
Referee: Fernando Rapallini (Argentina)
17 June 2021
21:00

Netherlands	2–0	Austria
Depay 11' (pen.); Dumfries 67'	Report

Johan Cruyff Arena, Amsterdam
Attendance: 15,243
Referee: Orel Grinfeld (Israel)

21 June 2021
18:00

North Macedonia	0–3	Netherlands
	Report	Depay 24'; Wijnaldum 50', 58'

Johan Cruyff Arena, Amsterdam
Attendance: 15,227
Referee: István Kovács (Romania)
21 June 2021
18:00 (19:00 UTC+3)

Ukraine	0–1	Austria
	Report	Baumgartner 21'

Arena Națională, Bucharest
Attendance: 10,472
Referee: Cüneyt Çakır (Turkey)

=== Group D ===
Pos	Team	Pld	W	D	L	GF	GA	GD	Pts	Qualification
1	England (H)	3	2	1	0	2	0	+2	7	Advance to knockout stage
2	Croatia	3	1	1	1	4	3	+1	4 (Note: Tied on head-to-head result (Croatia 1–1 Czech Republic) and overall goal difference (+1). Overall goals for was used as the tiebreaker.)	Advance to knockout stage
3	Czech Republic	3	1	1	1	3	2	+1	4	Advance to knockout stage
4	Scotland (H)	3	0	1	2	1	5	−4	1	

Source: UEFA
(H) Hosts
Notes:
13 June 2021
15:00 (14:00 UTC+1)

England	1–0	Croatia
Sterling 57'	Report

Wembley Stadium, London
Attendance: 18,497
Referee: Daniele Orsato (Italy)
14 June 2021
15:00 (14:00 UTC+1)

Scotland	0–2	Czech Republic
	Report	Schick 42', 52'

Hampden Park, Glasgow
Attendance: 9,847
Referee: Daniel Siebert (Germany)

18 June 2021
18:00 (17:00 UTC+1)

Croatia	1–1	Czech Republic
Perišić 47'	Report	Schick 37' (pen.)

Hampden Park, Glasgow
Attendance: 5,607
Referee: Carlos del Cerro Grande (Spain)
18 June 2021
21:00 (20:00 UTC+1)

England	0–0	Scotland
	Report

Wembley Stadium, London
Attendance: 20,306
Referee: Antonio Mateu Lahoz (Spain)

22 June 2021
21:00 (20:00 UTC+1)

Croatia	3–1	Scotland
Vlašić 17'; Modrić 62'; Perišić 77'	Report	McGregor 42'

Hampden Park, Glasgow
Attendance: 9,896
Referee: Fernando Rapallini (Argentina)
22 June 2021
21:00 (20:00 UTC+1)

Czech Republic	0–1	England
	Report	Sterling 12'

Wembley Stadium, London
Attendance: 19,104
Referee: Artur Soares Dias (Portugal)

=== Group E ===
Pos	Team	Pld	W	D	L	GF	GA	GD	Pts	Qualification
1	Sweden	3	2	1	0	4	2	+2	7	Advance to knockout stage
2	Spain (H)	3	1	2	0	6	1	+5	5	Advance to knockout stage
3	Slovakia	3	1	0	2	2	7	−5	3	
4	Poland	3	0	1	2	4	6	−2	1	

Source: UEFA
(H) Hosts
14 June 2021
18:00 (19:00 UTC+3)

Poland	1–2	Slovakia
Linetty 46'	Report	Szczęsny 18' (o.g.); Škriniar 69'

Krestovsky Stadium, Saint Petersburg
Attendance: 12,862
Referee: Ovidiu Hațegan (Romania)
14 June 2021
21:00

Spain	0–0	Sweden
	Report

Estadio de La Cartuja, Seville
Attendance: 10,559
Referee: Slavko Vinčić (Slovenia)

18 June 2021
15:00 (16:00 UTC+3)

Sweden	1–0	Slovakia
Forsberg 77' (pen.)	Report

Krestovsky Stadium, Saint Petersburg
Attendance: 11,525
Referee: Daniel Siebert (Germany)
19 June 2021
21:00

Spain	1–1	Poland
Morata 25'	Report	Lewandowski 54'

Estadio de La Cartuja, Seville
Attendance: 11,742
Referee: Daniele Orsato (Italy)

23 June 2021
18:00

Slovakia	0–5	Spain
	Report	Dúbravka 30' (o.g.); Laporte 45+3'; Sarabia 56'; F. Torres 67'; Kucka 71' (o.g.)

Estadio de La Cartuja, Seville
Attendance: 11,204
Referee: Björn Kuipers (Netherlands)
23 June 2021
18:00 (19:00 UTC+3)

Sweden	3–2	Poland
Forsberg 2', 59'; Claesson 90+4'	Report	Lewandowski 61', 84'

Krestovsky Stadium, Saint Petersburg
Attendance: 14,252
Referee: Michael Oliver (England)

=== Group F ===
Pos	Team	Pld	W	D	L	GF	GA	GD	Pts	Qualification
1	France	3	1	2	0	4	3	+1	5	Advance to knockout stage
2	Germany (H)	3	1	1	1	6	5	+1	4 (Note: Head-to-head result: Portugal 2–4 Germany.)	Advance to knockout stage
3	Portugal	3	1	1	1	7	6	+1	4	Advance to knockout stage
4	Hungary (H)	3	0	2	1	3	6	−3	2	

Source: UEFA
(H) Hosts
Notes:
15 June 2021
18:00

Hungary	0–3	Portugal
	Report	Guerreiro 84'; Ronaldo 87' (pen.), 90+2'

Puskás Aréna, Budapest
Attendance: 55,662
Referee: Cüneyt Çakır (Turkey)
15 June 2021
21:00

France	1–0	Germany
Hummels 20' (o.g.)	Report

Allianz Arena, Munich
Attendance: 13,000
Referee: Carlos del Cerro Grande (Spain)

19 June 2021
15:00

Hungary	1–1	France
Fiola 45+2'	Report	Griezmann 66'

Puskás Aréna, Budapest
Attendance: 55,998
Referee: Michael Oliver (England)
19 June 2021
18:00

Portugal	2–4	Germany
Ronaldo 15'; Jota 67'	Report	Dias 35' (o.g.); Guerreiro 39' (o.g.); Havertz 51'; Gosens 60'

Allianz Arena, Munich
Attendance: 12,926
Referee: Anthony Taylor (England)

23 June 2021
21:00

Portugal	2–2	France
Ronaldo 31' (pen.), 60' (pen.)	Report	Benzema 45+2' (pen.), 47'

Puskás Aréna, Budapest
Attendance: 54,886
Referee: Antonio Mateu Lahoz (Spain)
23 June 2021
21:00

Germany	2–2	Hungary
Havertz 66'; Goretzka 84'	Report	Ád. Szalai 11'; Schäfer 68'

Allianz Arena, Munich
Attendance: 12,413
Referee: Sergei Karasev (Russia)

=== Ranking of third-placed teams ===
Pos	Grp	Team	Pld	W	D	L	GF	GA	GD	Pts	Qualification
1	F	Portugal	3	1	1	1	7	6	+1	4	Advance to knockout stage
2	D	Czech Republic	3	1	1	1	3	2	+1	4	Advance to knockout stage
3	A	Switzerland	3	1	1	1	4	5	−1	4	Advance to knockout stage
4	C	Ukraine	3	1	0	2	4	5	−1	3	Advance to knockout stage
5	B	Finland	3	1	0	2	1	3	−2	3	
6	E	Slovakia	3	1	0	2	2	7	−5	3	

Source: UEFA
Rules for classification: 1) Points; 2) Goal difference; 3) Goals scored; 4) Wins; 5) Lower disciplinary points total; 6) European Qualifiers overall ranking.

== Knockout stage ==
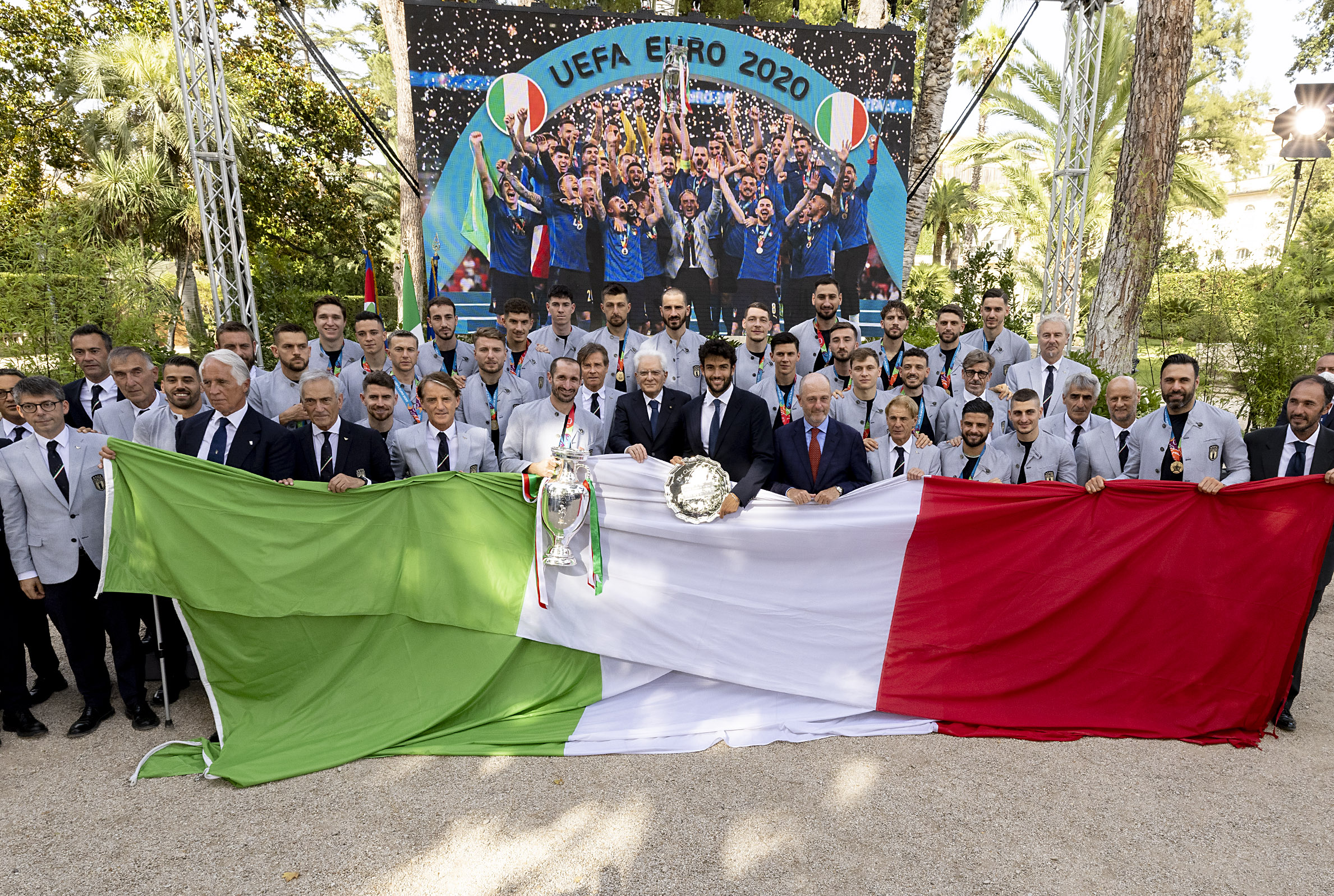
President Sergio Mattarella celebrates Italy victory and Matteo Berrettini's Wimbledon Final

In the knockout stage, if a match was level at the end of normal playing time, extra time was played (two periods of 15 minutes each), with each team being allowed to make a sixth substitution. If still tied after extra time, the match was decided by a penalty shoot-out.

As with every tournament since UEFA Euro 1984, there was no third place play-off.

Times is CEST (UTC+2), as listed by UEFA. If the venue was located in a different time zone, the local time is also given.

=== Bracket ===
Round of 16
27 June 2021 – Seville
Belgium	1
Portugal	0
26 June 2021 – London
Italy (a.e.t.)	2
Austria	1
28 June 2021 – Bucharest
France	3 (4)
Switzerland (p)	3 (5)
28 June 2021 – Copenhagen
Croatia	3
Spain (a.e.t.)	5
29 June 2021 – Glasgow
Sweden	1
Ukraine (a.e.t.)	2
29 June 2021 – London
England	2
Germany	0
27 June 2021 – Budapest
Netherlands	0
Czech Republic	2
26 June 2021 – Amsterdam
Wales	0
Denmark	4

Quarter-finals
2 July 2021 – Munich
Belgium	1
Italy	2
2 July 2021 – Saint Petersburg
Switzerland	1 (1)
Spain (p)	1 (3)
3 July 2021 – Rome
Ukraine	0
England	4
3 July 2021 – Baku
Czech Republic	1
Denmark	2

Semi-finals
6 July 2021 – London
Italy (p)	1 (4)
Spain	1 (2)
7 July 2021 – London
England (a.e.t.)	2
Denmark	1

Final
11 July 2021 – London
Italy (p)	1 (3)
England	1 (2)

=== Round of 16 ===
26 June 2021
18:00

Wales	0–4	Denmark
	Report	Dolberg 27', 48'; Mæhle 88'; Braithwaite 90+4'

Johan Cruyff Arena, Amsterdam
Attendance: 14,645
Referee: Daniel Siebert (Germany)

26 June 2021
21:00 (20:00 UTC+1)

Italy	2–1 (a.e.t.)	Austria
Chiesa 95'; Pessina 105'	Report	Kalajdžić 114'

Wembley Stadium, London
Attendance: 18,910
Referee: Anthony Taylor (England)

27 June 2021
18:00

Netherlands	0–2	Czech Republic
	Report	Holeš 68'; Schick 80'

Puskás Aréna, Budapest
Attendance: 52,834
Referee: Sergei Karasev (Russia)

27 June 2021
21:00

Belgium	1–0	Portugal
T. Hazard 42'	Report

Estadio de La Cartuja, Seville
Attendance: 11,504
Referee: Felix Brych (Germany)

28 June 2021
18:00

Croatia	3–5 (a.e.t.)	Spain
Pedri 20' (o.g.); Oršić 85'; Pašalić 90+2'	Report	Sarabia 38'; Azpilicueta 57'; F. Torres 77'; Morata 100'; Oyarzabal 103'

Parken Stadium, Copenhagen
Attendance: 22,771
Referee: Cüneyt Çakır (Turkey)

28 June 2021
21:00 (22:00 UTC+3)

France	3–3 (a.e.t.)	Switzerland
Benzema 57', 59'; Pogba 75'	Report	Seferovic 15', 81'; Gavranović 90'
Penalties
Pogba (penalty scored); Giroud (penalty scored); Thuram (penalty scored); Kimpembe (penalty scored); Mbappé (penalty missed)	4–5	(penalty scored) Gavranović; (penalty scored) Schär; (penalty scored) Akanji; (penalty scored) Vargas; (penalty scored) Mehmedi

Arena Națională, Bucharest
Attendance: 22,642
Referee: Fernando Rapallini (Argentina)

29 June 2021
18:00 (17:00 UTC+1)

England	2–0	Germany
Sterling 75'; Kane 86'	Report

Wembley Stadium, London
Attendance: 41,973
Referee: Danny Makkelie (Netherlands)

29 June 2021
21:00 (20:00 UTC+1)

Sweden	1–2 (a.e.t.)	Ukraine
Forsberg 43'	Report	Zinchenko 27'; Dovbyk 120+1'

Hampden Park, Glasgow
Attendance: 9,221
Referee: Daniele Orsato (Italy)

=== Quarter-finals ===
2 July 2021
18:00 (19:00 UTC+3)

Switzerland	1–1 (a.e.t.)	Spain
Shaqiri 68'	Report	Zakaria 8' (o.g.)
Penalties
Gavranović (penalty scored); Schär (penalty missed); Akanji (penalty missed); Vargas (penalty missed)	1–3	(penalty missed) Busquets; (penalty scored) Olmo; (penalty missed) Rodri; (penalty scored) Gerard; (penalty scored) Oyarzabal

Krestovsky Stadium, Saint Petersburg
Attendance: 24,764
Referee: Michael Oliver (England)

2 July 2021
21:00

Belgium	1–2	Italy
Lukaku 45+2' (pen.)	Report	Barella 31'; Insigne 44'

Allianz Arena, Munich
Attendance: 12,984
Referee: Slavko Vinčić (Slovenia)

3 July 2021
18:00 (20:00 UTC+4)

Czech Republic	1–2	Denmark
Schick 49'	Report	Delaney 5'; Dolberg 42'

Olympic Stadium, Baku
Attendance: 16,306
Referee: Björn Kuipers (Netherlands)

3 July 2021
21:00

Ukraine	0–4	England
	Report	Kane 4', 50'; Maguire 46'; J. Henderson 63'

Stadio Olimpico, Rome
Attendance: 11,880
Referee: Felix Brych (Germany)

=== Semi-finals ===
6 July 2021
21:00 (20:00 UTC+1)

Italy	1–1 (a.e.t.)	Spain
Chiesa 60'	Report	Morata 80'
Penalties
Locatelli (penalty missed); Belotti (penalty scored); Bonucci (penalty scored); Bernardeschi (penalty scored); Jorginho (penalty scored)	4–2	(penalty missed) Olmo; (penalty scored) Gerard; (penalty scored) Thiago; (penalty missed) Morata

Wembley Stadium, London
Attendance: 57,811
Referee: Felix Brych (Germany)

7 July 2021
21:00 (20:00 UTC+1)

England	2–1 (a.e.t.)	Denmark
Kjær 39' (o.g.); Kane 104'	Report	Damsgaard 30'

Wembley Stadium, London
Attendance: 64,950
Referee: Danny Makkelie (Netherlands)

=== Final ===
11 July 2021
21:00 (20:00 UTC+1)

Italy	1–1 (a.e.t.)	England
Bonucci 67'	Report	Shaw 2'
Penalties
Berardi (penalty scored); Belotti (penalty missed); Bonucci (penalty scored); Bernardeschi (penalty scored); Jorginho (penalty missed)	3–2	(penalty scored) Kane; (penalty scored) Maguire; (penalty missed) Rashford; (penalty missed) Sancho; (penalty missed) Saka

Wembley Stadium, London
Attendance: 67,173
Referee: Björn Kuipers (Netherlands)

== Statistics ==
=== Goalscorers ===
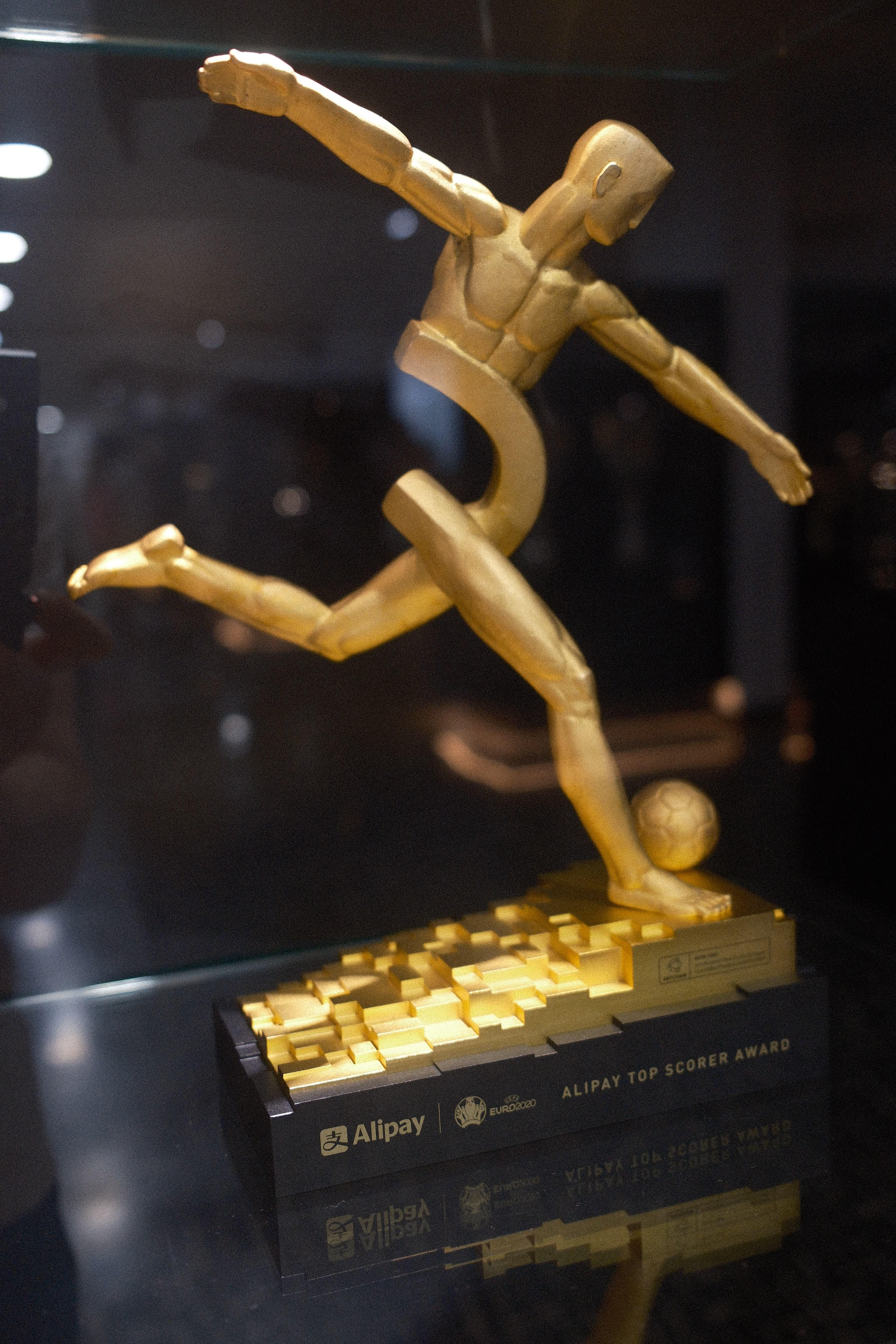
The Alipay Top Scorer award.

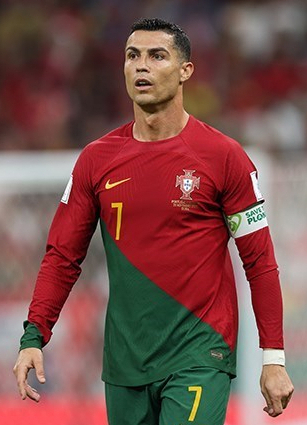
Portugal captain and forward Cristiano Ronaldo won the top scorer award after scoring five goals in the tournament.

There were 142 goals scored in 51 matches, for an average of 2.78 goals per match.

The tournament had the highest goal average since UEFA Euro 1976, prior to the introduction of the group stage. Eleven own goals were scored in the tournament, two more than at all the previous tournaments combined. With his goals in this tournament, Cristiano Ronaldo became the top goalscorer at the European Championship with 14 goals.

5 goals

- (Czech Republic) Patrik Schick
- (Portugal) Cristiano Ronaldo

4 goals

- (Belgium) Romelu Lukaku
- (England) Harry Kane
- (France) Karim Benzema
- (Sweden) Emil Forsberg

3 goals

- (Denmark) Kasper Dolberg
- (England) Raheem Sterling
- (Netherlands) Georginio Wijnaldum
- (Poland) Robert Lewandowski
- (Spain) Álvaro Morata
- (Switzerland) Haris Seferovic
- (Switzerland) Xherdan Shaqiri

2 goals

- (Belgium) Thorgan Hazard
- (Croatia) Ivan Perišić
- (Denmark) Mikkel Damsgaard
- (Denmark) Joakim Mæhle
- (Denmark) Yussuf Poulsen
- (Germany) Kai Havertz
- (Italy) Federico Chiesa
- (Italy) Ciro Immobile
- (Italy) Lorenzo Insigne
- (Italy) Manuel Locatelli
- (Italy) Matteo Pessina
- (Netherlands) Memphis Depay
- (Netherlands) Denzel Dumfries
- (Spain) Pablo Sarabia
- (Spain) Ferran Torres
- (Ukraine) Roman Yaremchuk
- (Ukraine) Andriy Yarmolenko

1 goal

- (Austria) Marko Arnautović
- (Austria) Christoph Baumgartner
- (Austria) Michael Gregoritsch
- (Austria) Saša Kalajdžić
- (Austria) Stefan Lainer
- (Belgium) Kevin De Bruyne
- (Belgium) Thomas Meunier
- (Croatia) Luka Modrić
- (Croatia) Mislav Oršić
- (Croatia) Mario Pašalić
- (Croatia) Nikola Vlašić
- (Czech Republic) Tomáš Holeš
- (Denmark) Martin Braithwaite
- (Denmark) Andreas Christensen
- (Denmark) Thomas Delaney
- (England) Jordan Henderson
- (England) Harry Maguire
- (England) Luke Shaw
- (Finland) Joel Pohjanpalo
- (France) Antoine Griezmann
- (France) Paul Pogba
- (Germany) Leon Goretzka
- (Germany) Robin Gosens
- (Hungary) Attila Fiola
- (Hungary) András Schäfer
- (Hungary) Ádám Szalai
- (Italy) Nicolò Barella
- (Italy) Leonardo Bonucci
- (Netherlands) Wout Weghorst
- (North Macedonia) Ezgjan Alioski
- (North Macedonia) Goran Pandev
- (Poland) Karol Linetty
- (Portugal) Raphaël Guerreiro
- (Portugal) Diogo Jota
- (Russia) Artem Dzyuba
- (Russia) Aleksei Miranchuk
- (Scotland) Callum McGregor
- (Slovakia) Milan Škriniar
- (Spain) César Azpilicueta
- (Spain) Aymeric Laporte
- (Spain) Mikel Oyarzabal
- (Sweden) Viktor Claesson
- (Switzerland) Breel Embolo
- (Switzerland) Mario Gavranović
- (Turkey) İrfan Kahveci
- (Ukraine) Artem Dovbyk
- (Ukraine) Oleksandr Zinchenko
- (Wales) Kieffer Moore
- (Wales) Aaron Ramsey
- (Wales) Connor Roberts

1 own goal

- (Denmark) Simon Kjær (against England)
- (Finland) Lukas Hradecky (against Belgium)
- (Germany) Mats Hummels (against France)
- (Poland) Wojciech Szczęsny (against Slovakia)
- (Portugal) Rúben Dias (against Germany)
- (Portugal) Raphaël Guerreiro (against Germany)
- (Slovakia) Martin Dúbravka (against Spain)
- (Slovakia) Juraj Kucka (against Spain)
- (Spain) Pedri (against Croatia)
- (Switzerland) Denis Zakaria (against Spain)
- (Turkey) Merih Demiral (against Italy)

Source: UEFA

=== Awards ===

UEFA Team of the Tournament

UEFA Team of the Tournament

UEFA's technical observer team was given the objective of naming a team of the best eleven players from the tournament. Five players from the winning Italian squad were named in the team.

Goalkeeper	Defenders	Midfielders	Forwards
(Italy) Gianluigi Donnarumma	(England) Kyle Walker (England) Harry Maguire (Italy) Leonardo Bonucci (Italy) Leonardo Spinazzola	(Denmark) Pierre-Emile Højbjerg (Italy) Jorginho (Spain) Pedri	(England) Raheem Sterling (Belgium) Romelu Lukaku (Italy) Federico Chiesa

Player of the Tournament

The Player of the Tournament award was given to Gianluigi Donnarumma, the first goalkeeper to win the award, who was chosen by UEFA's technical observers.

- (Italy) Gianluigi Donnarumma

Young Player of the Tournament

The Young Player of the Tournament award, open to players born on or after 1 January 1998, was given to Pedri, as chosen by UEFA's technical observers.

- (Spain) Pedri – 25 November 2002 (aged 18)

Top Scorer

The "Alipay Top Scorer" award, given to the top scorer of the tournament, was awarded to Cristiano Ronaldo, who scored five goals and recorded one assist. The ranking was determined using the following criteria: goals, assists, fewest minutes played and goals in qualifying.

Top scorer rankings
Rank	Player	Goals	Assists	Minutes
1st place, gold medalist(s)	(Portugal) Cristiano Ronaldo	5	1	360
2nd place, silver medalist(s)	(Czech Republic) Patrik Schick	5	0	404
3rd place, bronze medalist(s)	(France) Karim Benzema	4	0	349

Goal of the Tournament

The Goal of the Tournament was decided by online voting. A total 10 goals were in the shortlist. On 14 July 2021, after an open vote with over 800,000 entries, UEFA announced that Czech forward Patrik Schick's second goal against Scotland had been named the goal of the tournament.

- (Czech Republic) Patrik Schick (second goal vs Scotland)

=== Prize money ===
The prize money was finalised in February 2018. Each team received a participation fee of €9.25 million, with the winner able to earn a maximum of €34 million.

Prize money
Rank (unoff.)	Team	€ million
1	Italy	34
2	England	30.25
3	Spain	22.5
4	Denmark	21
5	Belgium	19
6	Czech Republic; Switzerland	16.75
8	Ukraine	16
9	Netherlands	15.75
10	Sweden	15
11	Austria; France	14.25
13	Portugal; Croatia; Germany; Wales	13.5
17	Finland; Slovakia; Russia; Hungary	10.75
21	Poland; Scotland	10
23	Turkey; North Macedonia	9.25

Round achieved	Amount	Number of teams
Final tournament	€9.25m	24
Group stage	€1.5m for a win €750,000 for a draw	24
Round of 16	€2m	16
Quarter-finals	€3.25m	8
Semi-finals	€5m	4
Runner-up	€7m	1
Winner	€10m	1

=== Discipline ===
A player or team official was automatically suspended for the next match for the following offences:

- Receiving a red card (red card suspensions could be extended for serious offences)
- Receiving two yellow cards in two different matches; (Note: As yellow cards are not carried forward to penalty shoot-outs, players may be shown two yellow cards in the same fixture without being sent off. However, this would result in a suspension for accumulating two yellow cards during the tournament.) yellow cards expired after the completion of the quarter-finals (yellow card suspensions were not carried forward to any other future international matches)

The following players earned a suspension during the tournament:

Player	Offence(s)	Suspension(s)
(Poland) Grzegorz Krychowiak	(yellow card) (yellow-red card) in Group E vs Slovakia (matchday 1; 14 June 2021)	Group E vs Spain (matchday 2; 19 June 2021)
(Austria) Marko Arnautović	Insulting Ezgjan Alioski in Group C vs North Macedonia (matchday 1; 13 June 2021)	Group C vs Netherlands (matchday 2; 17 June 2021)
(Wales) Ethan Ampadu	(red card) in Group A vs Italy (matchday 3; 20 June 2021)	Round of 16 vs Denmark (26 June 2021)
(Croatia) Dejan Lovren	(yellow card) in Group D vs Czech Republic (matchday 2; 18 June 2021); (yellow card) in Group D vs Scotland (matchday 3; 22 June 2021)	Round of 16 vs Spain (28 June 2021)
(Czech Republic) Jan Bořil	(yellow card) in Group D vs Croatia (matchday 2; 18 June 2021); (yellow card) in Group D vs England (matchday 3; 22 June 2021)	Round of 16 vs Netherlands (27 June 2021)
(Wales) Harry Wilson	(red card) in Round of 16 vs Denmark (26 June 2021)	Suspension served outside tournament
(Netherlands) Matthijs de Ligt	(red card) in Round of 16 vs Czech Republic (27 June 2021)	Suspension served outside tournament
(Switzerland) Granit Xhaka	(yellow card) in Group A vs Turkey (matchday 3; 20 June 2021); (yellow card) in Round of 16 vs France (28 June 2021)	Quarter-finals vs Spain (2 July 2021)
(Sweden) Marcus Danielson	(red card) in Round of 16 vs Ukraine (29 June 2021)	Suspension served outside tournament
(Switzerland) Remo Freuler	(red card) in Quarter-finals vs Spain (2 July 2021)	Suspension served outside tournament

== Marketing ==
=== Logo and slogan ===
The official logo was unveiled on 21 September 2016, during a ceremony at the City Hall in London. The logo depicted the Henri Delaunay Trophy surrounded by celebrating fans on a bridge, which, according to UEFA, represented how football connects and unifies people.

Each individual host city also had their own unique logo. The rectangular logos featured the text UEFA EURO 2020 on the top, the city name above the text host city on the bottom (all in uppercase), the main tournament logo on the left and a local bridge on the right. Each logo existed in English, along with variations in the local language when applicable. The logos were unveiled from September 2016 to January 2017.

Logos of host cities
Host city	Date announced	Bridge	Other language	Ref.
London	21 September 2016 (Note: As part of the main logo launch event.)	Tower Bridge	—N/a	
Rome	22 September 2016	Ponte Sant'Angelo	Italian	
Baku	30 September 2016	Baku cable-stayed bridge	Azerbaijani	
Bucharest	15 October 2016	Basarab Overpass	Romanian	
Glasgow	25 October 2016	Clyde Arc	—N/a	
Munich	27 October 2016	Wittelsbacherbrücke	German	
Copenhagen	1 November 2016	Circle Bridge	Danish	
Budapest	16 November 2016	Széchenyi Chain Bridge	Hungarian	
Amsterdam	16 December 2016	Magere Brug	Dutch	
Saint Petersburg	19 January 2017	Palace Bridge	Russian	
Seville	—N/a	Alamillo Bridge	Spanish	

Logos of removed host cities
Host city	Date announced	Bridge	Other language(s)	Ref.
Dublin	24 November 2016	Samuel Beckett Bridge	Irish	
Brussels	14 December 2016	Pont Sobieski	Dutch, French	
Bilbao	15 December 2016	San Antón Bridge	Spanish	

The official slogan of the tournament was "Live It. For Real." The slogan was meant to encourage fans to see the matches live in the stadiums across Europe.

=== Match ball ===
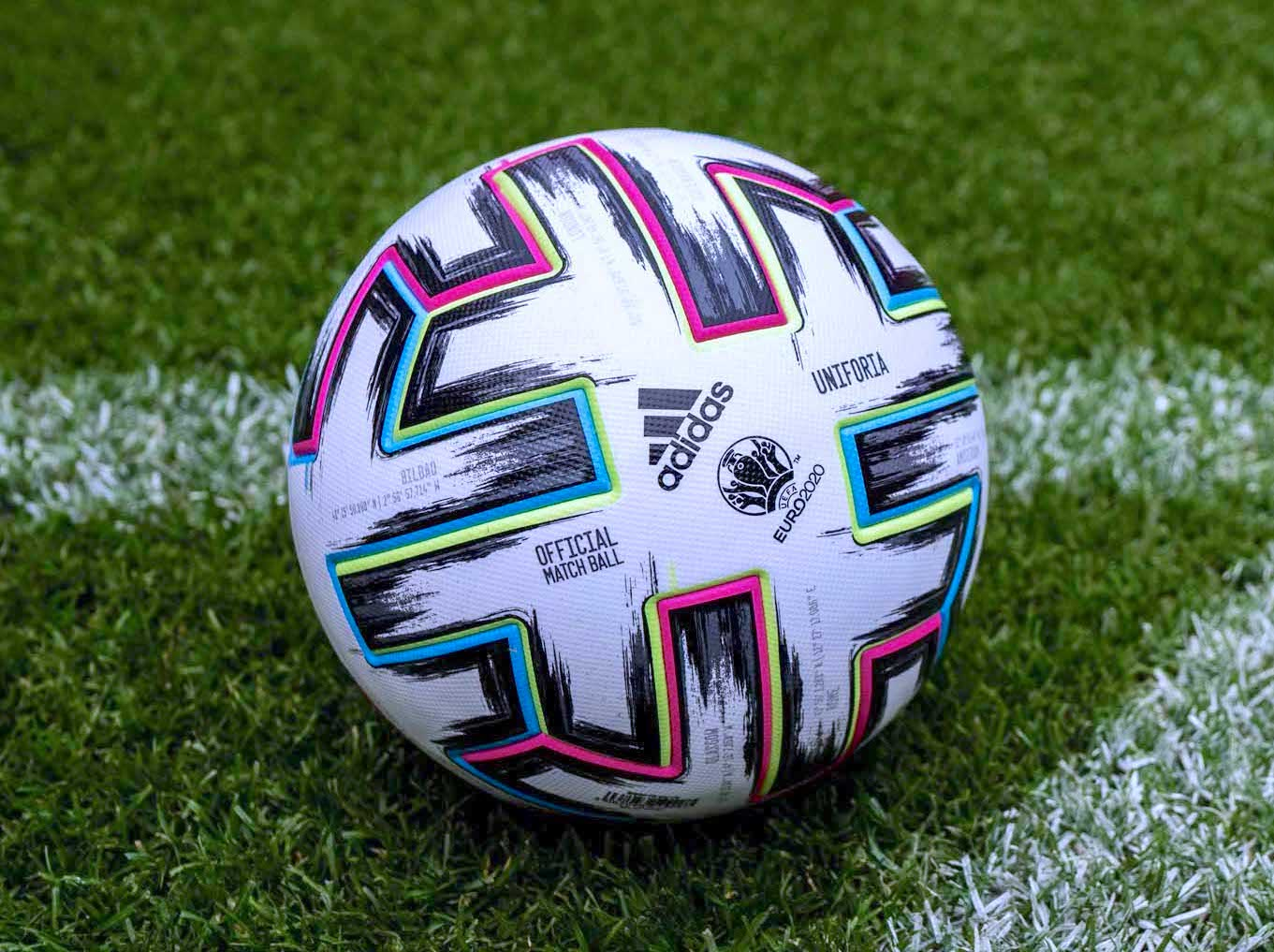
Official match ball "Adidas Uniforia"

On 6 November 2019, UEFA announced that the "Adidas Uniforia" would be the tournament's official match ball. Predominantly white, the ball featured black strokes with blue, neon and pink stripes with panels designed to resemble a hashtag, and had the coordinates of twelve cities which hosted the finals (including Dublin and Bilbao, which were later removed as the host cities). The name was derived from a portmanteau of "unity" and "euphoria".

A special variation named "Adidas Uniforia Finale" was launched on 5 July 2021, to be used in both semi-finals and the final match. The ball had a silver base, a different colour arrangement, and Wembley Stadium's coordinates (51° 33' 21,5" N, 0° 16' 46,4" W) written on the ball.

=== Mascot ===
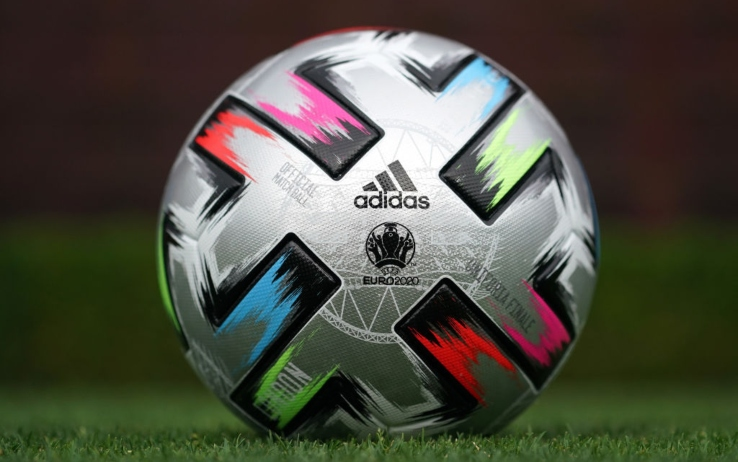
"Adidas Uniforia Finale", ball used in the semifinals and in the final match

The official mascot of the tournament, "Skillzy", was unveiled on 24 March 2019. The character was inspired by freestyle football, street football, and panna culture.

=== Official song ===
On 19 October 2019, Dutch DJ and music producer Martin Garrix was announced as the official music artist of the tournament. He produced the official song of the tournament, as well as the walkout music preceding matches and the television broadcast music. The official song, "We Are the People", featured Bono and the Edge from Irish rock band U2 and was released on 14 May 2021. It was first performed in full at a virtual opening ceremony at the Stadio Olimpico in Rome.

=== Video game ===
The game was released by Konami as a free DLC on eFootball PES 2020 in June 2020, and on the eFootball PES 2021 Season Update on launch day. It included the official kits and player likenesses for all 55 officially licensed UEFA teams. The update also included five out of eleven venues of the tournament, as well as the official match ball.

=== Sponsorship ===
UEFA had the following sponsorship partners:

- "National Team Football Official Sponsors": Alibaba Group (Alipay brand), Booking Holdings, FedEx, Gazprom, Hisense, and Volkswagen.
- "Euro 2020 Official Sponsors": Coca-Cola, Heineken, Qatar Airways, Takeaway.com, TikTok, and Vivo Mobile.
- "Euro 2020 Official Licensees": Adidas, Hublot, IMG, Konami, and Panini.

== Broadcasting ==
The International Broadcast Centre (IBC) was located at the Expo Haarlemmermeer in Vijfhuizen, Netherlands.

== Incidents and controversies ==
=== Ukraine kit ===
The team of Ukraine presented its shirt for the championship, decorated with a map of national borders, including Crimea. The peninsula was annexed by the Russian Federation in 2014 but is still considered part of its territory by Ukraine and the United Nations. The shirt carried the slogan "Glory to Ukraine! Glory to the heroes!" Russian Foreign Ministry spokeswoman Maria Zakharova said that it was a Ukrainian nationalist slogan that imitated a Nazi one. Russian Deputy Dmitry Svishchev called UEFA to intervene because the shirt was "totally inappropriate". UEFA said there was no dispute for the map of Ukraine, as it reflected the borders recognized by the United Nations, while it ordered the removal of the phrase, as "specific combination of the two slogans is deemed to be clearly political in nature, having historic and militaristic significance."

=== Collapse of Christian Eriksen ===
The Denmark vs Finland match in Group B was suspended minutes prior to half-time after Danish midfielder Christian Eriksen collapsed on the pitch after suffering a sudden cardiac arrest. He was given immediate cardiopulmonary resuscitation, then transferred to Rigshospitalet and stabilised, with the match resuming by the decision of the Danish team later that evening.

Following the match, the Danish team stated that it was unfair they had to decide to continue playing the match. Former Danish international Peter Schmeichel said that the Danish team had been given the options to finish the game that same day, finish the game the next day at 12 pm, or forfeit the game and lose 3–0. UEFA denied that either team had been threatened with a forfeit.

British broadcaster BBC received over 6,000 complaints over the UEFA video-feed broadcasting live images of Eriksen receiving CPR on the pitch. Eriksen was later fitted with an implantable cardioverter-defibrillator, and returned to playing with Brentford eight months later.

=== Marko Arnautović insult ===
In the Austria vs North Macedonia match on 13 June 2021, Austrian player Marko Arnautović insulted Macedonian player Ezgjan Alioski and his family after his goal to make it 3–1. Arnautović is of Serbian descent, and Alioski is of Albanian descent; both countries have been in conflict over Kosovo for decades. The Football Federation of North Macedonia lodged a complaint with UEFA after the game, demanding a clear penalty. The UEFA Control Committee then opened an investigation, Arnautović was banned from the next game by UEFA for "insulting another player", and was unable to play in Netherlands vs Austria, the group's second game.

=== Removing marketing drink bottles ===
At a press conference before Hungary vs Portugal on 14 June 2021, Cristiano Ronaldo removed Coca-Cola bottles from the table and then held a water bottle in front of the camera to highlight that water, healthier than Coca-Cola, is his ideal drink; it was thought that Ronaldo's actions were behind the collapse of Coca-Cola market value, but it was later found it had nothing to do with it. After France vs Germany, France's Paul Pogba, a practising Muslim, moved bottles of non-alcoholic Heineken beer from the table at a press conference. After these two actions, UEFA spoke with each team participating in the European Championship, in which it pointed out the importance of sponsors. UEFA also said that if it happened again, then punishments would be given out to those players.

=== Greenpeace protest ===
In the run-up to the France vs Germany on 15 June 2021 in Munich, a man with a paramotor got stuck on a fixed rope during a flight over the stadium, fell into a descent, grazed the spectator stands, and landed on the pitch. In the action planned as a protest by Greenpeace against car manufacturer Volkswagen, in which only a large ball with a label was supposed to be thrown onto the field, two people in the stands suffered head injuries and had to receive medical care. The campaign provoked strong criticism due to the endangerment of viewers; UEFA criticised it as a "reckless and dangerous action" that could have had serious consequences for many people. The German Football Association (DFB), the Bavarian Prime Minister Markus Söder, and other politicians made similar statements, and Greenpeace apologised. A total flight ban was issued over the stadium for the duration of the European Championship. The Munich police investigated the paramotor pilot for dangerous bodily harm, trespassing, and violation of the Aviation Act. The 40 year old pilot was later convicted of endangering air traffic and negligent bodily harm and fined €7,200 for parachuting into the stadium and a further €3,500 in damages to one of the people who were injured, while another 36-year-old man who helped to organise the protest was ordered to pay a fine of €3,000.

=== Captain's rainbow armband ===
In connection with Pride Month, the German team used related symbolism. Team captain Manuel Neuer wore a captain's armband in rainbow colours in a friendly against Latvia on 7 June and continued to wear the armband in Germany's subsequent games. An investigation by UEFA followed during the group stage of the tournament. They assessed the armband as a "team symbol for diversity" and "a good cause." UEFA decided not to impose a penalty because of the rule broken by Neuer, which obliges team captains to wear UEFA captains' armbands.

=== Illumination of the Allianz Arena in rainbow colours ===
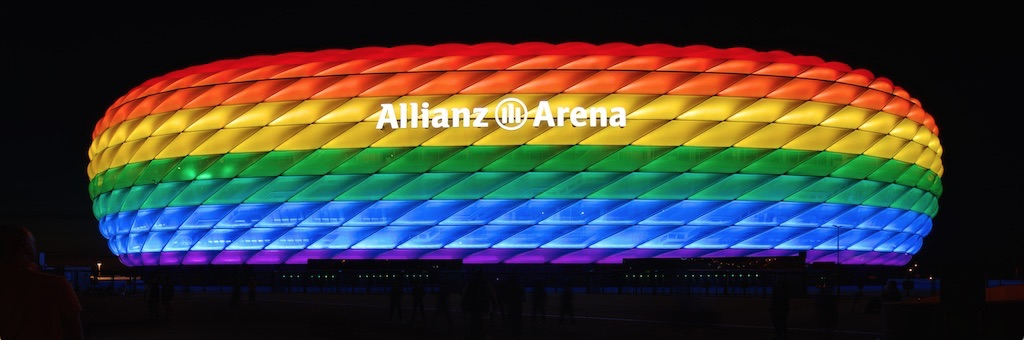
Lighting of the Allianz Arena in rainbow colours (2016)

Before the Germany vs Hungary group stage match on 23 June 2021, Munich City Council applied to UEFA to have the façade of the stadium illuminated in rainbow colours as a sign of diversity and tolerance. Since the project was understood as a protest against a law passed by the Hungarian Parliament that, according to its critics, restricts the "information rights" of young people with regard to homosexuality and gender transitioning, UEFA rejected the application with reference to its status as a politically and religiously neutral organisation. After initially approving the illumination of the stadium in rainbow colours, the German Football Association joined the UEFA position. The Mayor of Munich Dieter Reiter criticised these decisions and described the illumination not as a political measure but as what he called a sign of humanity and a symbol for the acceptance of equality between people. In contrast, the Hungarian Minister of Foreign Affairs Péter Szijjártó welcomed UEFA's decision "not to be involved in a political provocation against Hungary."

Numerous reactions from German political parties condemned the ban by UEFA. Nationwide, other football stadiums, such as those in Cologne, Augsburg, Frankfurt, Wolfsburg, Berlin, and Darmstadt, were to be illuminated in the rainbow colours. Munich illuminated the Town Hall, Olympiaturm, and the wind turbine right next to the football arena. In the Netherlands, the Erasmusbrug, Ziggo Dome, tower in Alphen aan den Rijn and several town halls were illuminated. In protest against the UEFA ban, several large German corporations also changed their company logos on social media sites to rainbow colours. This included BMW, Volkswagen, Deutsche Telekom, Siemens, Sparkasse, and HypoVereinsbank. CSD Germany announced that they would be distributing up to 11,000 flags, 5,000 cardboard boxes, and 4,500 stickers with the words "Don't Kick LGBTIQ Rights" to fans in front of the stadium. On 23 June, UEFA itself also changed their logo in social media to include a rainbow background, with a statement that "the rainbow is not a political symbol, but a sign of our firm commitment to a more diverse and inclusive society." As a counter-action, Gábor Kubatov, president of the Hungarian club Ferencváros and vice-president of Fidesz, called for stadiums in Hungary to be illuminated in the Hungarian national colours. In addition, Prime Minister of Hungary Viktor Orbán cancelled a visit to Munich in protest.

=== Confiscation of rainbow flag in Baku ===
On 3 July 2021, UEFA began an investigation after two fans had a rainbow flag confiscated during the quarter-final match between the Czech Republic and Denmark at the Baku Olympic Stadium in Azerbaijan. Photos emerged while the match was being played, showing two stewards taking a rainbow flag, waved in support of the LGBTQ+ community, being taken. In a statement, UEFA said: "UEFA never instructed stewards in Baku – or in any other stadium – to confiscate rainbow flags. We are currently investigating what happened and we will of course contact the UEFA delegate, UEFA security officer and local authorities to clear this up. The rainbow flag is a symbol that embodies UEFA core values, promoting everything that we believe in – a more just and egalitarian society, tolerant of everyone and UEFA has ensured that the flag was returned to the supporter."

=== England vs Denmark incidents ===
In the 104th minute in the England vs Denmark semi-final match, on-field referee Danny Makkelie awarded a penalty kick to England after adjudging Danish defender Joakim Mæhle to have fouled English player Raheem Sterling in the penalty area. Danish goalkeeper Kasper Schmeichel stopped Harry Kane's penalty kick, but Kane was able to score from the rebound. In a press conference shortly after the match, Danish coach Kasper Hjulmand expressed his dissatisfaction with the penalty decision, as well as the fact that there were two balls on the pitch when the foul was given. Non-English commentators such as Arsène Wenger, José Mourinho, and Dietmar Hamann criticised the penalty decision during and after the match, arguing that the penalty should not have been awarded when checked by VAR, while Roy Keane described it as "very, very soft". Former England forward Alan Shearer also described the penalty decision as "soft", and said he would be "pretty angry if that penalty was given against England", while former England full-back Gary Neville said: "If we're being fair, you'd be absolutely devastated if you lost to a penalty like that." Match official and current ESPN rules analyst Mark Clattenburg, who refereed the UEFA Euro 2016 Final, said he would not have awarded a penalty kick for a tackle of this sort "in such a key moment."

The Birmingham Mail claimed Denmark disrupted the English wall during a critical free kick that led to the opening goal of the match, and that Denmark's goal should have been disallowed as a result. According to the FIFA Laws of the Game, during a free kick, attackers must be within one metre from the defending team's wall, a rule that was violated by the Danish players who were accused of blocking goalkeeper Jordan Pickford's vision.

On 8 July 2021, a day after the match, UEFA opened a disciplinary case against the English Football Association over a laser pointed at Danish goalkeeper Schmeichel just before the decisive penalty, booing when the Danish national anthem was played, and use of pyrotechnics. The laser pointer first came to the notice of both the Football Association and UEFA in the first half of extra time but a search for the culprit was unsuccessful. The Football Association were fined £25,630 (€30,000) for the three offences.

=== Italy vs England incidents ===
==== Storming of Wembley stadium before final ====
On the day of the UEFA Euro 2020 final between Italy and England, thousands of England fans gathered at Wembley Stadium throughout the morning and afternoon, which prompted the police to urge anyone without tickets to not travel there. Two hours before the final, footage showed hundreds of fans fighting with stewards and police as they attempted to force their way past barriers to get into the stadium. Around 400 people managed to gain access to the stadium, in block 104, without paying for a ticket. Huge crowds gathered in Leicester Square throwing bottles and other objects, and Trafalgar Square, where a ticketed fan zone was set up. As a result of the violence and disorder, a total of 86 people were arrested by police, 53 of which were made at Wembley stadium for a number of offences, including public order breaches, assault, drunk and disorderly conduct and criminal damage. 19 police officers were injured, including one who lost a tooth and another suffered a broken hand.

On 12 July 2021, a day after the final, the Football Association said it would conduct a full review into how people without tickets were able to breach security and gain access to Wembley stadium for the Euro 2020 final. On 13 July 2021, following the chaotic scenes, UEFA opened a disciplinary case against the Football Association for the invasion of the pitch by an England supporter, throwing of objects by supporters, disturbances during the Italian national anthem, and the use of pyrotechnics.

On 18 October 2021, UEFA punished the Football Association (FA) for the unrest at the final by ordering England to play their next UEFA competition match behind closed doors. UEFA also imposed a ban for a second game, suspended for two years, and fined the FA £84,560 (€100,000) for the lack of order and discipline inside and around the stadium, for the invasion of the field of play, for the throwing of objects and for the disturbances during the national anthems.

==== Online racist abuse after final ====
England football players Bukayo Saka, Jadon Sancho, and Marcus Rashford were subjected to racist abuse online after missing penalties in England's Euro 2020 final defeat by Italy. The three football players took the last three penalties, two of which were saved by Italy goalkeeper Gianluigi Donnarumma, during England's 3–2 loss on penalties on Sunday 11 July 2021, and were all immediately targeted with racist language and emojis on their social media accounts.

The Football Association condemned the racist abuse and said it was "appalled by the online racism" aimed at some players on social media. In a statement, it said: "We could not be clearer that anyone behind such disgusting behaviour is not welcome in following the team. We will do all we can to support the players affected while urging the toughest punishments possible for anyone responsible. We will continue to do everything we can to stamp discrimination out of the game, but we implore government to act quickly and bring in the appropriate legislation so this abuse has real life consequences. Social media companies need to step up and take accountability and action to ban abusers from their platforms, gather evidence that can lead to prosecution and support making their platforms free from this type of abhorrent abuse."

The Metropolitan Police began investigating the abuse and said on Twitter that the abuse was "totally unacceptable" and it would not be tolerated. Then British Prime Minister Boris Johnson, Leader of the Opposition Keir Starmer, and the Football Association president Prince William, Duke of Cambridge, also condemned the racist abuse.

== Reception ==
The tournament was admired for its high scoring, with 2.78 goals per game, a record for any European Championship since the introduction of the group stage in 1980. Two of the highest-scoring games at the European Championship occurred during the tournament. 18 goals scored across four group stage matches on 23 June 2021 were a tournament record, whereas 14 goals scored in the Croatia vs Spain and France vs Switzerland matches on 28 June 2021 made it the highest-scoring day in knockout stages and the second highest overall.

The "light touch" officiating was also well received, with a perception that referees aimed to keep play moving.
