= Amenaprkich Monastery (Gazanchy) =

Armenian monastery in Nakhchivan, Azerbaijan

- Ամենափրկիչ Վանք
- Location: Qazançı, Nakhchivan
- Country: Azerbaijan
- Denomination: Armenian Apostolic Church

History
- Status: Destroyed
- Founded: 12–13th centuries

Architecture
- Style: Domed basilica
- Demolished: 1997–2009

Amenaprkich Monastery was an Armenian monastery in Gazanchy village (Julfa District) of the Nakhchivan Autonomous Republic of Azerbaijan. The monastery was located in the center of the village.

== History ==
The monastery was founded in the 12–13th centuries and was rebuilt in 1654, according to an Armenian inscription on a khachkar set above the lintel of the doorway.

== Architecture ==
In the late Soviet years, the outer walls of the monastery complex, the porch attached to the church, and other associated buildings were in ruins. It was a basilica structure consisting of a nave with two aisles, an apse and two vestries. The western facade bore an Armenian inscription while interior walls had fragments of wall painting.

== Destruction ==
The monastery was razed to ground at some point between 1997 and November 11, 2009, as documented by investigation of the Caucasus Heritage Watch.
