= Khudafarin Bridges =

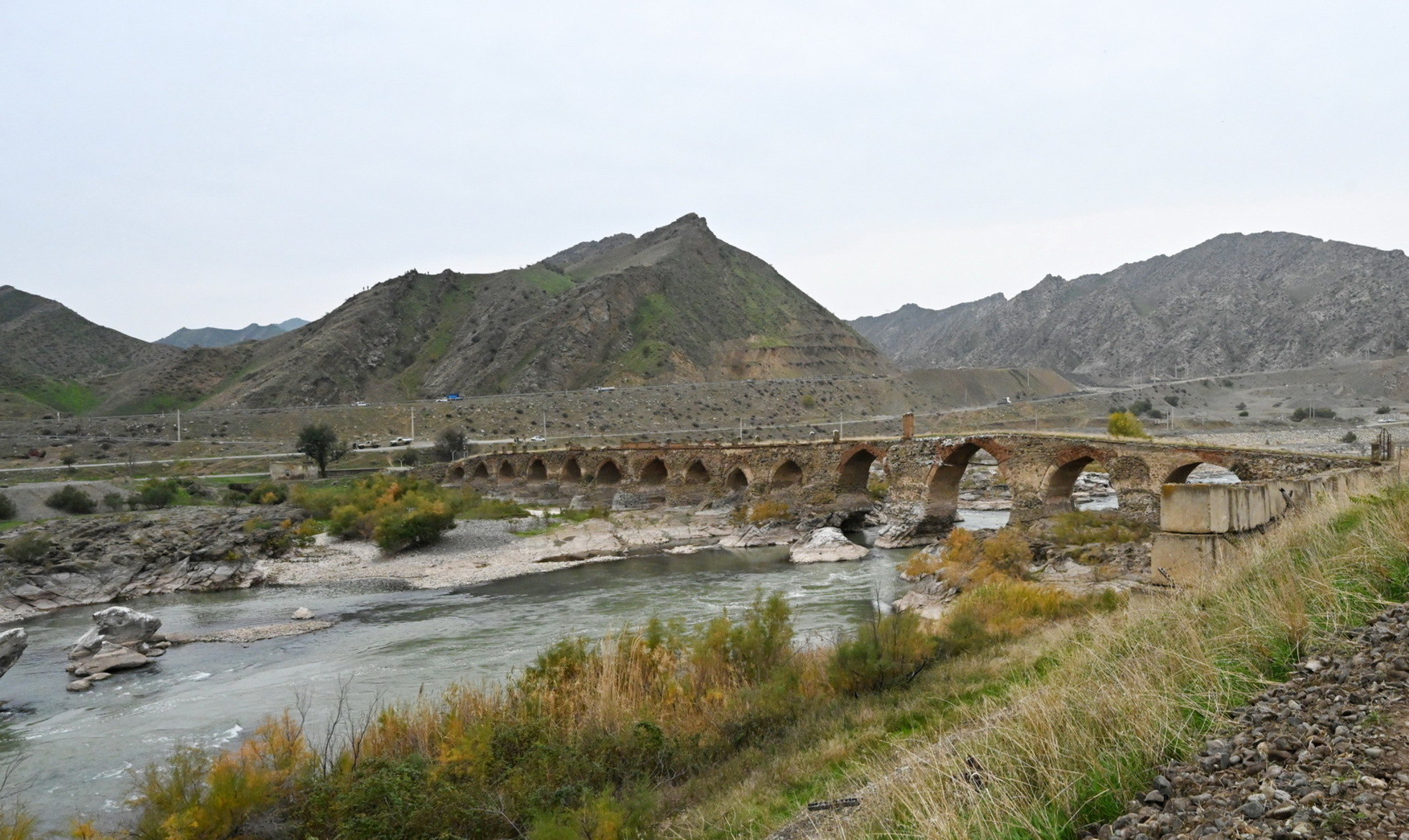
- 15-span bridge in 2020
- Coordinates: 39.15°N 46.9416°E
- Crosses: Aras River
- Locale: Jabrayil District, Azerbaijan / East Azerbaijan province, Iran
- Official name: Azerbaijani: Xudafərin körpüləri,

Characteristics
- Total length: 130 m (427 ft) (first bridge); 200 m (656 ft)) (second bridge)

History
- Closed: No

Location
- Interactive map of Khudafarin Bridges

Khudafarin Bridges or Khoda Afarin Bridges (Azerbaijani: Xudafərin körpüləri , Persian: پل خداآفرین), are two arch bridges located at the border of Azerbaijan and Iran connecting the northern and southern banks of the Aras River.

== History ==
Communication between the Caucasus and the historical Iranian region of Azerbaijan has long been hampered by the Aras River. Therefore, bridges have been built over it since ancient times. The Khudafarin bridge is strategically important and is considered one of the historical main points of contact between the Caucasus and the Iranian Azerbaijan. This bridge has also been called the "Khosrow Bridge" and "Aras Bridge" in chronicles. The bridge is first attested in the first half of the 14th century, in the Nuzhat al-Qulub by the Iranian geographer Hamdallah Mustawfi. The origin of the bridge's name has been the subject of several stories, most of which are mixed with mythology. According to the 18th-century Iranian historian Mohammad Kazem Marvi, the bridge is known as "Khudafarin" ("God created") because during the Ilkhanate era (1256–1335), fruitless efforts were made to build the bridge, until one day, the bridge suddenly appeared, having been created by the unseen.

The bridge's history and date cannot be precisely confirmed because it was destroyed numerous times throughout history and lacks any stone inscriptions or architectural inscriptions. There has likely been a bridge across the Aras River in this vicinity for a long time. Some historians consider the bridge to have existed since the era of the pre-Islamic Achaemenid Empire (550–330 BC), during the reign of Cyrus the Great (r. 550 – 530 BC), to allow him to cross into the Caucasus. They base their argument on the Achaemenid era's advancement and growth in road building as well as their campaigns throughout the Caucasus. Other historians consider the bridge that the Shaddadid ruler Abu'l-Aswar Shavur ibn Fadl (r. 1022–1067) erected in 1027 over the Aras River during his march to the Caucasus to be the Khudafarin bridge. Others consider the bridge's architectural design to date back to the era of the Seljuk Empire (1037–1194).

According to Hamdallah Mustawfi, the bridge was built by Bukayr ibn Abdallah, one of the Arab commanders who led the conquest of Iranian Azerbaijan (Adurbadagan) during the rise of Islam. The Iranian historian Hassan Mousavizadeh considers this unlikely, stating that the Arabs did not have experience with bridge building at the time. He states that, based on the available evidence, the bridge predates Islam and was present throughout the era of the Sasanian Empire (224–651). From the rise of Islam until the end of the Russo-Persian War of 1826–1828, the bridge was the scene of several fights and conflicts.

The Khodafarin bridge is frequently cited in accounts of the events of the Russo-Persian wars of 1804–1813 and 1828. This bridge was used as a staging area for military operations and a means of transportation during two wars, and it was repeatedly destroyed and rebuilt.

In 1805, the Qajar shah (king) of Iran, Fath-Ali Shah Qajar (r. 1797–1834) discovered that the Karabakh khan Ibrahim Khalil Khan had defected from the Iranian government and joined the Russian forces. He therefore dispatched the crown prince Abbas Mirza and the latter's deputy Mirza Bozorg Qa'em-Maqam to bring Ibrahim Khalil Khan under control. The Russian general Pavel Tsitsianov deployed some troops to stop Abbas Mirza's soldiers from advancing at the base of the Khudafarin bridge in an effort to aid Ibrahim Khalil Khan. However, Abbas Mirza's forces eventually overcame the Russians and took control of the Shusha fortress, Ibrahim Khalil Khan's government headquarters.

Today, there are two bridges called Khudafarin Bridges in the vicinity, one is small and the other bigger. The engineering and architectural features of these two bridges differ from one another. The age of little bridge is unknown, although most scholars have suggested that it dates to the Safavid era (1501–1736). These two bridges are currently closed on both sides of Iran's and Azerbaijan's borders.

== Researches ==
The first description of the 15-span bridge was given in the work "the Art of Iran" published in 1938 under the editorship of A. Pope. The work also includes a schematic drawing of the bridge.

A. Sadikhzade was the first Azerbaijani scientist to study the bridges on the spot and perform their visual measurements, publishing the results of research in 1963 in the "History of Azerbaijani architecture".

A detailed study of the remains of the bridges and their measurements was made in 1974.

== Construction ==
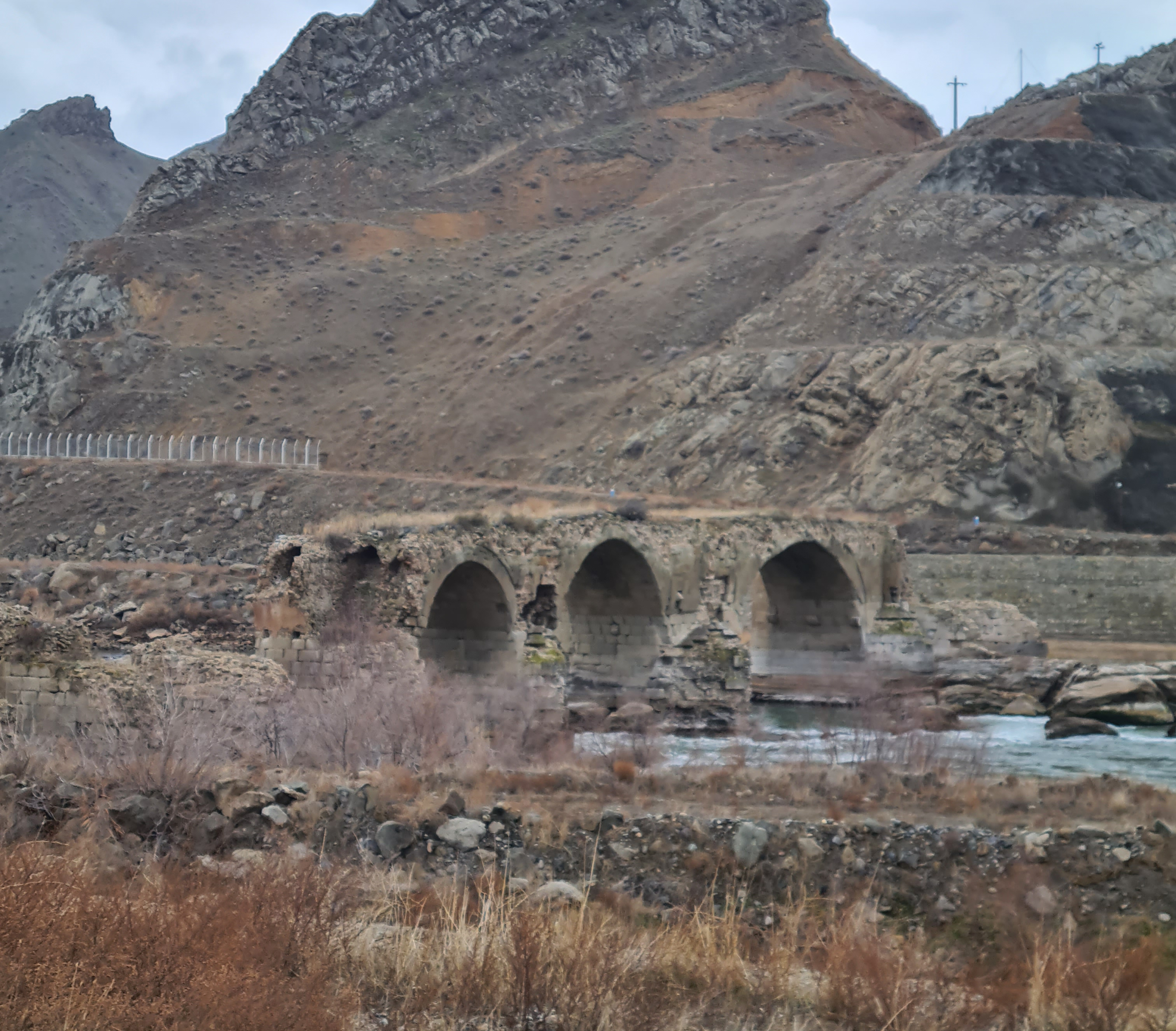
11-span bridge in 2023

The bridges are located at a distance of 800 m from each other.

The 11-span bridge is called "Synyg korpu" ("broken bridge").

Architects used river cobblestone (breakwaters and arches) and square baked brick (parapet of the upper part) to build the 15-span bridge.

Only natural rock outcrops were used as bridge abutments. The bridge spans have different sizes. Following the terrain structure, the bridge is not straight in the plan, but has a certain curvature.

The length of the 15-span bridge is about 200 meters, width – 4.5 m. The highest point of the bridge is 10 m above the water level. The breakwaters protecting the bridge abutments are triangular in plan and are built of river cobblestone. On the reverse side, the breakwaters have a semicircular shape.

Abutments of the 11-span bridge were also built of rock outcrops. In the middle part of the river, the spans are longer and, consequently, higher, and closer to the banks, the spans are smaller in both width and height. The total length of this bridge is 130 m, width – 6 m, maximum height – 12 m above the water.

The binding solution of the 15-span bridge was made of clay with an admixture of milk.

== See also ==
- Azerbaijan–Iran border
- Khoda Afarin Dam
- List of bridges in Azerbaijan

== Sources ==
- Mousavizadeh, Hassan (2018). "خدا آفرین". The Great Islamic Encyclopaedia (in Persian).

Media related to Khudafarin Bridges at Wikimedia Commons
