= Gazanchi Bridge =

17th-century bridge in Julfa, Azerbaijan

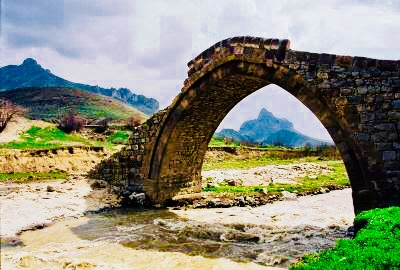
- Interactive map of Gazanchi Bridge
- 39.2338°N 45.7030°E
- Location: Qazançı, Nakhchivan,Julfa, Azerbaijan (city)

History
- Built: 17th century

Site notes
- Area: Nakhchivan Autonomous Republic

Gazanchi Bridge (Azerbaijani: Qazançı körpüsü; Persian: پل گزانچی) is a historical bridge built in the 17th century during the time of Safavid Iran, and located in the territory of Gazanchi village, Julfa District, Azerbaijan. The bridge was included in the list of architectural monuments of national importance by decision no. 132 of the Cabinet of Ministers of the Republic of Azerbaijan dated August 2, 2001, and by decision no. 98 of the Cabinet of Ministers of the Nakhchivan Autonomous Republic dated November 21, 2007. It is also known as the Kazanchi Bridge, Qazanchi Bridge, and Gazanchy Bridge.

== History ==
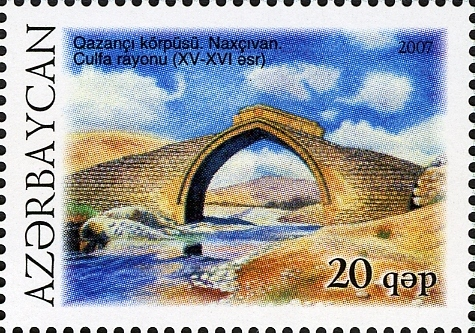
Postage stamp issued in 2007

Gazanchi Bridge spans the Alinjachay River, to the south of Gazanchi village in the Julfa District of Azerbaijan. Locals also refer to it as the “Gozbel Bridge.” Lacking any inscription or other historical reference its time of construction is uncertain. Its construction technique and architectural-structural design date it from the early 17th century, during the reign of Shah Abbas I (1587–1629).

This bridge once served the Silk Road, connecting caravan routes that extended eastward from Gazanchi village and joined the main road in the Ordubad region. The bridge is 3.55 meters wide, 10.85 meters long, and 8.8 meters high. It was built using roughly hewn rubble stones. The arches' frames and archivolts are made of finely cut sandstone, which visually distinguishes them from the uncut surfaces of the bridge walls, highlighting the structure’s architectural composition.

After Azerbaijan regained its independence, Gazanchi Bridge was included in the list of immovable historical and cultural monuments of national importance by Decision No. 132 of the Cabinet of Ministers of the Republic of Azerbaijan, dated August 2, 2001.

On November 1, 2007, the "Azermarka" company issued a set of five postage stamps dedicated to Azerbaijani bridges. One of the stamps, with a face value of 20 qapik and a circulation of 20,000 copies, was dedicated to Gazanchi Bridge. Later that same month, by decision no. 98 of the Cabinet of Ministers of the Nakhchivan Autonomous Republic, dated November 21, 2007, Qazanchi Bridge was officially recognized as a monument of national architectural significance.

In 2018, restoration work was carried out on the bridge. This included reinforcing 120 meters of the surrounding riverbanks, replacing worn stones on the load-bearing parts, thoroughly cleaning the joints between the stones, and reapplying lime mortar to secure them.

== Sources ==
- Naxçıvan ensiklopediyası [Nakhchivan encyclopedia] (in Azerbaijani). Vol. I. Naxçıvan: Elm nəşriyyatı. 2005. p. 360. ISBN 5806614689.
- The Encyclopaedia of “Nakhchivan Monuments” (in Azerbaijani). Naxçıvan: national Academy of sciences of Azerbaijan nakhchivan branch. 2008. p. 521.
- Baxşəliyev, Vəli; Quliyeva, Fizzə (2017). Naxçıvanın tarixi abidələri [Historical monuments of Nakhchivan] (PDF) (in Azerbaijani). Bakı: Nurlan nəşriyyatı. p. 212.
- İsayev, Elbrus (2012). Böyük İpək yolu və Naxçıvan [The Great Silk Road and Nakhchivan] (in Azerbaijani). Bakı: Elm və təhsil nəşriyyatı. p. 214.
- Səfərli, Hacıfəxrəddin (2017). Naxçıvanın türk-islam mədəniyyət abidələri [Turkic-Islamic Cultural Monuments of Nakhchivan] (in Azerbaijani). Naxçıvan: Əcəmi NPM. p. 216.
