= Qazançı, Nakhchivan =

Village and municipality in Nakhchivan, Azerbaijan

Gazanchy
- Municipality
- Azerbaijani: Qazançı
- Location within Azerbaijan
- Coordinates: 39°14′15″N 45°41′57″E
- Country: Azerbaijan
- Autonomous republic: Nakhchivan
- District: Julfa

Population (2005)
  - Total: 692
- Time zone: UTC+4 (AZT)

Qazançı (also rendered as Kazanchi, Gazanchy, Gazanchi, Ghazanchi), also known as Shahkert (Armenian: Շահկերտ, romanized: Šahkert), is a village and municipality in the Julfa District of Nakhchivan, Azerbaijan.

It is located 43 km in the north from the district center, on the right bank of the Alinjachay River, on the slope of the Zangezur ridge.

== History ==
The village is located in the ancient Armenian province of Goght. Its alternative name means coppersmiths (ghazanchetsi) in Armenian and the village was famous for the quality of the copper utensils produced there. In the 19th century, Armenians from Shahkert migrated to Shusha where they continued their trade as coppersmiths. The Ghazanchetsots Cathedral in Shusha is named after this village.

== Historical and archaeological monuments ==
=== Surp Amenaprkich Monastery ===
Within the village (until at least the 1990s) was an Armenian church that was originally part of a monastery called Surp Amenaprkich. Ayvazian dates it to the 12th century, with additions from the 17th century. The monastery was destroyed at some point between 1997 and November 11, 2009.

=== Gazanchi Bridge ===
Gazanchi Bridge is the historical monument in the Gazanchi village of Julfa District. According to its techniques of construction, it belongs to the 16th century. The single-span monument, known among people as "humpbacked bridge", is unsuitable for transport although it remained relatively well. The Gazanchi bridge was built with the fragments of hewed and polished stone. The shield of its arch and the archivolt were built with the hewed stones. The Gazanchi bridge is one of the best examples of the single-span bridges in the territory of Azerbaijan Republic. According to its dedicatory inscription, it was constructed in 1551 by funds provided by Poghos Ghazananchetsi, a resident of Gazanchi.

=== Gazanchi Fortress ===
Gazanchi Fortress is the monument of the beginning of the 2nd–1st millennium BC in the north from the Gazanchi village of Julfa District, on both banks of the Alinjachay River. The left bank and right bank parts of the fortress are separated from each other by deep canyons; the right bank part is in the shape of the tall conical hill. According to the sources, there was the fortress which was fortified with semicircular towers on the peak of the hill. The left coast of the monument has two parts, and is surrounded by the steepness rocks from all sides. At this part has remained the ruins of the half-round towers. The fortress consists of a magnificent multi-layered defense system. There is a passage from the barrier to each other. The defense walls (the width of 2–2.5 meters) were built in the high architectural style from the hewn large stones.

The Gazanchi Fortress probably was the center of a large tribal unity who lived in the valley of the Alinjachay at the beginning of the 2nd millennium BC. The found materials (examples of the clay plates in gray and pink colored, stone tools, grinding stones) from the Gazanchi Fortress during archaeological excavations, are typical of the culture of Nakhchivan. Techniques of construction of the fortress walls repeat the fortress of Oghlangala. Surface materials collected from the Gazanchy Fortress consist of the grain stones, examples of the clay pot in the gray and pink colored (pot, bowl, little pot-type pottery etc.). The findings are kept in the Museum of History and Ethnography of Julfa rayon. The Gazanchi Fortress is the connected with the name of the Gazan Khan, the protagonist of the epos of The Book of Dede Korkut (Babayev, S., The Toponyms of "The Book of Dede Korkut" in Nakhchivan, Baku, 1999).

=== Gazanchy ===
Gazanchy is the settlement of the Middle Ages in the northern part of the same named village of the Julfa District. Most of the monument was left under the modern buildings. At the foot of the mountain, in the unharmed part of residence the cultural layer was destroyed, the fragments of glazed and unglazed clay pots scattered to the around. In some places the remained the residues of the wall from the uncouth rocks. The animal figures and clay lamps were found from the area. According to the findings, it is assumed that the Gazanchy settlement belongs to the 9th–18th centuries.

=== Gazanchy Necropolis I ===
Gazanchy Necropolis I is the archaeological monument of the Middle Ages in the north-east from the Gazanchy village of Julfa District, on the elongated hill. In 1991, the exploration research works were carried out. The graves are in the direction of Qibla; most of the graves do not have gravestones; and the chest stones of the graves are in the oblong and rectangular shape (a group of them are in box-shaped). From the area were found the fragments of clay pots, and also have been found a few of the stone rams. It is supposed that the monument belongs to the 13th–17th centuries.

=== Gazanchy Necropolis II ===
Gazanchy Necropolis II is the archaeological monument of the Middle Ages in the south-east from the Gazanchy village of the Julfa District, on the right bank of the Alinjachay River. In 1991, the exploration research works were carried out. The graves are in the direction of Qibla; the gravestones not remained, the chest stones of the graves are in an oblong and rectangular shape. Some of the chest stones of the graves are flat. On two graves were defined the geometric lines. According to information, there have been the much more ram figured stones in the cemetery (currently kept only one). It is supposed that the monument belongs to the 14th–18th centuries.

=== Old Cemetery ===
There was an old Armenian cemetery located atop a hill, approximately 250 m northeast of the Amenaprkich Monastery. The cemetery consisted of 700–720 tombstones (including khachkars) in the late Soviet years. It was destroyed at some point between 1997 and November 11, 2009.

== Notable natives ==
- Rasul Guliyev – Speaker of the National Assembly of Azerbaijan (1993–1996)

== See also ==
Amenaprkich Monastery (Gazanchy)
