= UEFA Euro 2020 statistics =

European football tournament statistics

The following article outlines statistics for UEFA Euro 2020, which took place across Europe from 11 June to 11 July 2021 after being postponed by a year due to the COVID-19 pandemic. Goals scored during penalty shoot-outs are not counted, and matches decided by a penalty shoot-out are considered draws.

== Goalscorers ==
There were 142 goals scored in 51 matches, for an average of 2.78 goals per match.

The tournament had the highest goal average since UEFA Euro 1976, prior to the introduction of the group stage. Eleven own goals were scored in the tournament, two more than at all the previous tournaments combined. With his goals in this tournament, Cristiano Ronaldo became the top goalscorer at the European Championship with 14 goals.

5 goals

- (Czech Republic) Patrik Schick
- (Portugal) Cristiano Ronaldo

4 goals

- (Belgium) Romelu Lukaku
- (England) Harry Kane
- (France) Karim Benzema
- (Sweden) Emil Forsberg

3 goals

- (Denmark) Kasper Dolberg
- (England) Raheem Sterling
- (Netherlands) Georginio Wijnaldum
- (Poland) Robert Lewandowski
- (Spain) Álvaro Morata
- (Switzerland) Haris Seferovic
- (Switzerland) Xherdan Shaqiri

2 goals

- (Belgium) Thorgan Hazard
- (Croatia) Ivan Perišić
- (Denmark) Mikkel Damsgaard
- (Denmark) Joakim Mæhle
- (Denmark) Yussuf Poulsen
- (Germany) Kai Havertz
- (Italy) Federico Chiesa
- (Italy) Ciro Immobile
- (Italy) Lorenzo Insigne
- (Italy) Manuel Locatelli
- (Italy) Matteo Pessina
- (Netherlands) Memphis Depay
- (Netherlands) Denzel Dumfries
- (Spain) Pablo Sarabia
- (Spain) Ferran Torres
- (Ukraine) Roman Yaremchuk
- (Ukraine) Andriy Yarmolenko

1 goal

- (Austria) Marko Arnautović
- (Austria) Christoph Baumgartner
- (Austria) Michael Gregoritsch
- (Austria) Saša Kalajdžić
- (Austria) Stefan Lainer
- (Belgium) Kevin De Bruyne
- (Belgium) Thomas Meunier
- (Croatia) Luka Modrić
- (Croatia) Mislav Oršić
- (Croatia) Mario Pašalić
- (Croatia) Nikola Vlašić
- (Czech Republic) Tomáš Holeš
- (Denmark) Martin Braithwaite
- (Denmark) Andreas Christensen
- (Denmark) Thomas Delaney
- (England) Jordan Henderson
- (England) Harry Maguire
- (England) Luke Shaw
- (Finland) Joel Pohjanpalo
- (France) Antoine Griezmann
- (France) Paul Pogba
- (Germany) Leon Goretzka
- (Germany) Robin Gosens
- (Hungary) Attila Fiola
- (Hungary) András Schäfer
- (Hungary) Ádám Szalai
- (Italy) Nicolò Barella
- (Italy) Leonardo Bonucci
- (Netherlands) Wout Weghorst
- (North Macedonia) Ezgjan Alioski
- (North Macedonia) Goran Pandev
- (Poland) Karol Linetty
- (Portugal) Raphaël Guerreiro
- (Portugal) Diogo Jota
- (Russia) Artem Dzyuba
- (Russia) Aleksei Miranchuk
- (Scotland) Callum McGregor
- (Slovakia) Milan Škriniar
- (Spain) César Azpilicueta
- (Spain) Aymeric Laporte
- (Spain) Mikel Oyarzabal
- (Sweden) Viktor Claesson
- (Switzerland) Breel Embolo
- (Switzerland) Mario Gavranović
- (Turkey) İrfan Kahveci
- (Ukraine) Artem Dovbyk
- (Ukraine) Oleksandr Zinchenko
- (Wales) Kieffer Moore
- (Wales) Aaron Ramsey
- (Wales) Connor Roberts

1 own goal

- (Denmark) Simon Kjær (against England)
- (Finland) Lukas Hradecky (against Belgium)
- (Germany) Mats Hummels (against France)
- (Poland) Wojciech Szczęsny (against Slovakia)
- (Portugal) Rúben Dias (against Germany)
- (Portugal) Raphaël Guerreiro (against Germany)
- (Slovakia) Martin Dúbravka (against Spain)
- (Slovakia) Juraj Kucka (against Spain)
- (Spain) Pedri (against Croatia)
- (Switzerland) Denis Zakaria (against Spain)
- (Turkey) Merih Demiral (against Italy)

Source: UEFA

== Assists ==
4 assists

- (Switzerland) Steven Zuber

3 assists

- (Denmark) Pierre-Emile Højbjerg
- (England) Luke Shaw
- (Italy) Marco Verratti
- (Spain) Dani Olmo

2 assists

- (Austria) David Alaba
- (Belgium) Kevin De Bruyne
- (Belgium) Thomas Meunier
- (Czech Republic) Vladimír Coufal
- (England) Jack Grealish
- (Germany) Robin Gosens
- (Germany) Joshua Kimmich
- (Hungary) Roland Sallai
- (Italy) Domenico Berardi
- (Italy) Leonardo Spinazzola
- (Netherlands) Memphis Depay
- (Netherlands) Donyell Malen
- (Portugal) Rafa Silva
- (Spain) Jordi Alba
- (Spain) Gerard Moreno
- (Spain) Pablo Sarabia
- (Spain) Pau Torres
- (Sweden) Dejan Kulusevski
- (Ukraine) Andriy Yarmolenko
- (Wales) Gareth Bale

1 assist

- (Austria) Konrad Laimer
- (Austria) Marcel Sabitzer
- (Austria) Louis Schaub
- (Belgium) Eden Hazard
- (Belgium) Dries Mertens
- (Belgium) Thomas Vermaelen
- (Croatia) Mateo Kovačić
- (Croatia) Andrej Kramarić
- (Croatia) Luka Modrić
- (Croatia) Mislav Oršić
- (Croatia) Ivan Perišić
- (Czech Republic) Tomáš Holeš
- (Czech Republic) Tomáš Kalas
- (Denmark) Andreas Cornelius
- (Denmark) Mikkel Damsgaard
- (Denmark) Mathias Jensen
- (Denmark) Joakim Mæhle
- (Denmark) Jens Stryger Larsen
- (England) Mason Mount
- (England) Kalvin Phillips
- (England) Bukayo Saka
- (England) Raheem Sterling
- (England) Kieran Trippier
- (Finland) Jere Uronen
- (France) Antoine Griezmann
- (France) Lucas Hernandez
- (France) Kylian Mbappé
- (France) Paul Pogba
- (Germany) Mats Hummels
- (Hungary) Ádám Szalai
- (Italy) Francesco Acerbi
- (Italy) Nicolò Barella
- (Italy) Ciro Immobile
- (Italy) Rafael Tolói
- (Netherlands) Nathan Aké
- (Poland) Przemysław Frankowski
- (Poland) Kamil Jóźwiak
- (Poland) Maciej Rybus
- (Poland) Piotr Zieliński
- (Portugal) Diogo Jota
- (Portugal) Cristiano Ronaldo
- (Russia) Artem Dzyuba
- (Slovakia) Marek Hamšík
- (Slovakia) Róbert Mak
- (Spain) José Gayà
- (Spain) Ferran Torres
- (Sweden) Alexander Isak
- (Switzerland) Remo Freuler
- (Switzerland) Kevin Mbabu
- (Switzerland) Xherdan Shaqiri
- (Switzerland) Granit Xhaka
- (Turkey) Hakan Çalhanoğlu
- (Ukraine) Oleksandr Karavayev
- (Ukraine) Ruslan Malinovskyi
- (Ukraine) Roman Yaremchuk
- (Ukraine) Oleksandr Zinchenko
- (Wales) Joe Morrell

Source: UEFA

== Clean sheets ==
5 clean sheets

- (England) Jordan Pickford

3 clean sheets

- (Belgium) Thibaut Courtois
- (Italy) Gianluigi Donnarumma (Note: Salvatore Sirigu was substituted on for Gianluigi Donnarumma in the 89th minute of Italy's 1–0 win in Group A against Wales. Both goalkeepers were credited by UEFA with a clean sheet.)

2 clean sheets

- (Czech Republic) Tomáš Vaclík
- (Netherlands) Maarten Stekelenburg
- (Spain) Unai Simón
- (Sweden) Robin Olsen

1 clean sheet

- (Austria) Daniel Bachmann
- (Denmark) Kasper Schmeichel
- (Finland) Lukas Hradecky
- (France) Hugo Lloris
- (Italy) Salvatore Sirigu
- (Portugal) Rui Patrício
- (Russia) Matvei Safonov
- (Scotland) David Marshall
- (Wales) Danny Ward

Source: UEFA

== Awards ==
=== Golden Boot ===
Cristiano Ronaldo of Portugal and Patrik Schick of Czech Republic scored five goals each, but Ronaldo had one assist and thus received the Golden Boot award.

=== Man of the Match ===
Rank	Player	Team	Opponent(s)	Awards
1	Sergio Busquets	Spain	vs Slovakia (GS), vs Croatia (R16)	2
1	Federico Chiesa	Italy	vs Wales (GS), vs Spain (SF)	2
1	Denzel Dumfries	Netherlands	vs Ukraine (GS), vs Austria (GS)	2
1	Harry Kane	England	vs Ukraine (QF), vs Denmark (SF)	2
1	Romelu Lukaku	Belgium	vs Russia (GS), vs Denmark (GS)	2
1	Leonardo Spinazzola	Italy	vs Turkey (GS), vs Austria (R16)	2
7	David Alaba	Austria	vs North Macedonia (GS)	1
7	Jordi Alba	Spain	vs Poland (GS)	1
7	Gareth Bale	Wales	vs Turkey (GS)	1
7	Karim Benzema	France	vs Portugal (GS)	1
7	Leonardo Bonucci	Italy	vs England (Final)	1
7	Andreas Christensen	Denmark	vs Russia (GS)	1
7	Kevin De Bruyne	Belgium	vs Finland (GS)	1
7	Thomas Delaney	Denmark	vs Czech Republic (QF)	1
7	Kasper Dolberg	Denmark	vs Wales (R16)	1
7	Breel Embolo	Switzerland	vs Wales (GS)	1
7	Christian Eriksen	Denmark	vs Finland (GS)	1
7	Emil Forsberg	Sweden	vs Poland (GS)	1
7	Billy Gilmour	Scotland	vs England (GS)	1
7	Robin Gosens	Germany	vs Portugal (GS)	1
7	Florian Grillitsch	Austria	vs Ukraine (GS)	1
7	Thorgan Hazard	Belgium	vs Portugal (R16)	1
7	Tomáš Holeš	Czech Republic	vs Netherlands (R16)	1
7	Lorenzo Insigne	Italy	vs Belgium (QF)	1
7	Alexander Isak	Sweden	vs Slovakia (GS)	1
7	Joshua Kimmich	Germany	vs Hungary (GS)	1
7	László Kleinheisler	Hungary	vs France (GS)	1
7	Victor Lindelöf	Sweden	vs Spain (GS)	1
7	Manuel Locatelli	Italy	vs Switzerland (GS)	1
7	Harry Maguire	England	vs Germany (R16)	1
7	Aleksei Miranchuk	Russia	vs Finland (GS)	1
7	Luka Modrić	Croatia	vs Czech Republic (GS)	1
7	Paul Pogba	France	vs Germany (GS)	1
7	Cristiano Ronaldo	Portugal	vs Hungary (GS)	1
7	Bukayo Saka	England	vs Czech Republic (GS)	1
7	Patrik Schick	Czech Republic	vs Scotland (GS)	1
7	Xherdan Shaqiri	Switzerland	vs Turkey (GS)	1
7	Unai Simón	Spain	vs Switzerland (QF)	1
7	Milan Škriniar	Slovakia	vs Poland (GS)	1
7	Raheem Sterling	England	vs Croatia (GS)	1
7	Nikola Vlašić	Croatia	vs Scotland (GS)	1
7	Georginio Wijnaldum	Netherlands	vs North Macedonia (GS)	1
7	Granit Xhaka	Switzerland	vs France (R16)	1
7	Andriy Yarmolenko	Ukraine	vs North Macedonia (GS)	1
7	Oleksandr Zinchenko	Ukraine	vs Sweden (R16)	1

Source: UEFA

== Scoring ==
Overview

- Total number of goals scored: 142
- Average goals per match: 2.78
- Total number of braces: 14
  Karim Benzema (2), Kasper Dolberg, Emil Forsberg, Harry Kane, Robert Lewandowski, Manuel Locatelli, Romelu Lukaku, Cristiano Ronaldo (2), Patrik Schick, Haris Seferovic, Xherdan Shaqiri, Georginio Wijnaldum
- Total number of penalty kicks awarded: 16
- Total number of penalty kicks scored: 8
  Cristiano Ronaldo for Portugal against Hungary and France (2)
  Memphis Depay for Netherlands against Austria
  Emil Forsberg for Sweden against Slovakia
  Patrik Schick for Czech Republic against Croatia
  Artem Dzyuba for Russia against Denmark
  Karim Benzema for France against Portugal
  Romelu Lukaku for Belgium against Italy
- Total number of penalty kicks missed or saved: 8
  Pierre-Emile Højbjerg for Denmark against Finland
  Gareth Bale for Wales against Turkey
  Ezgjan Alioski for North Macedonia against Ukraine
  Ruslan Malinovskyi for Ukraine against North Macedonia
  Gerard Moreno for Spain against Poland
  Álvaro Morata for Spain against Slovakia
  Ricardo Rodríguez for Switzerland against France
  Harry Kane for England against Denmark
- Penalty kick success rate: 50%
- Own goals scored: 11
  Merih Demiral, Wojciech Szczęsny, Mats Hummels, Rúben Dias, Raphaël Guerreiro, Lukas Hradecky, Martin Dúbravka, Juraj Kucka, Pedri, Denis Zakaria, Simon Kjær

Timing

- First goal of the tournament: Merih Demiral (o.g.) for Italy against Turkey
- First brace of the tournament: Romelu Lukaku for Belgium against Russia
- Last goal of the tournament: Leonardo Bonucci for Italy against England
- Last brace of the tournament: Harry Kane for England against Ukraine
- Fastest goal in a match from kickoff: 2nd minute (1:22)
  Emil Forsberg for Sweden against Poland
- Fastest goal in a match after coming on as a substitute: 1 minute
  Ferran Torres for Spain against Slovakia (introduced in the 66th minute)
- Latest goal in a match without extra time: 90+5th minute
  Connor Roberts for Wales against Turkey
- Latest goal in a match with extra time: 120+1st minute
  Artem Dovbyk for Ukraine against Sweden
- Latest winning goal in a match without extra time: 90+4th minute
  Viktor Claesson for Sweden against Poland
- Latest winning goal in a match with extra time: 120+1st minute
  Artem Dovbyk for Ukraine against Sweden
- Shortest time difference between two goals scored by the same team in a match: 2 minutes
  Karim Benzema for France against Switzerland

Teams

- Most goals scored by a team: 13
  Italy, Spain
- Fewest goals scored by a team: 1
  Finland, Scotland, Turkey
- Most goals conceded by a team: 10
  Ukraine
- Fewest goals conceded by a team: 2
  England
- Best goal difference: +9
  England, Italy
- Worst goal difference: –7
  Turkey
- Most goals scored in a match by both teams: 8
  Croatia (3–5) Spain
- Most goals scored in a match by one team: 5
  Spain against Slovakia
  Spain against Croatia
- Most goals scored in a match by the losing team: 3
  Croatia against Spain
- Biggest margin of victory: 5 goals
  Slovakia (0–5) Spain
- Most clean sheets achieved by a team: 5
  England
- Fewest clean sheets achieved by a team: 0
  Croatia, Germany, Hungary, North Macedonia, Poland, Slovakia, Switzerland, Turkey, Ukraine
- Most clean sheets given by an opposing team: 2
  Finland, Germany, Scotland, Slovakia, Turkey, Ukraine, Wales
- Fewest clean sheets given by an opposing team: 0
  Belgium, France, Italy, Poland
- Most consecutive clean sheets achieved by a team: 5
  England
- Most consecutive clean sheets given by an opposing team: 2
  Finland, Scotland, Slovakia, Turkey, Wales

Individual

- Most goals scored by an individual: 5
  Cristiano Ronaldo, Patrik Schick
- Most assists provided by an individual: 4
  Steven Zuber
- Most goals and assists produced by an individual: 6
  Cristiano Ronaldo (5 goals, 1 assist)
- Most clean sheets achieved by a goalkeeper: 5
  Jordan Pickford
- Fewest clean sheets achieved by a goalkeeper: 0
  Heorhiy Bushchan, Uğurcan Çakır, Stole Dimitrievski, Martin Dúbravka, Péter Gulácsi, Dominik Livaković, Manuel Neuer, Anton Shunin, Yann Sommer, Wojciech Szczęsny
- Most consecutive clean sheets achieved by a goalkeeper: 5
  Jordan Pickford
- Most goals scored by one player in a match: 2
  Romelu Lukaku for Belgium against Russia, Patrik Schick for Czech Republic against Scotland, Cristiano Ronaldo for Portugal against Hungary, Manuel Locatelli for Italy against Switzerland, Xherdan Shaqiri for Switzerland against Turkey, Georginio Wijnaldum for Netherlands against North Macedonia, Emil Forsberg for Sweden against Poland, Robert Lewandowski for Poland against Sweden, Karim Benzema for France against Portugal, Cristiano Ronaldo for Portugal against France, Kasper Dolberg for Denmark against Wales, Karim Benzema for France against Switzerland, Haris Seferovic for Switzerland against France, Harry Kane for England against Ukraine
- Oldest goal scorer: 37 years and 321 days
  Goran Pandev for North Macedonia against Austria
- Youngest goal scorer: 20 years and 353 days
  Mikkel Damsgaard for Denmark against Russia

== Attendance ==
- Overall attendance: 1,099,278
- Average attendance per match: 21,554
- Highest attendance: 67,173 – Italy vs England
- Lowest attendance: 5,607 – Croatia vs Czech Republic

== Wins and losses ==
- Most wins: 5 – England, Italy
- Fewest wins: 0 – Hungary, North Macedonia, Poland, Scotland, Turkey
- Most losses: 3 – Denmark, North Macedonia, Turkey, Ukraine
- Fewest losses: 0 – England, France, Italy, Spain
- Most draws: 4 – Spain
- Fewest draws: 0 – Austria, Belgium, Denmark, Finland, Netherlands, North Macedonia, Russia, Slovakia, Turkey, Ukraine
- Most points in the group stage: 9 – Belgium, Italy, Netherlands
- Fewest points in the group stage: 0 – North Macedonia, Turkey

== Discipline ==
=== Summary ===
- Total number of yellow cards: 151
- Average yellow cards per match: 2.96
- Total number of red cards: 6
- Average red cards per match: 0.12
- First yellow card of the tournament: Çağlar Söyüncü for Turkey against Italy
- First red card of the tournament: Grzegorz Krychowiak for Poland against Slovakia
- Fastest yellow card from kick off: 2nd minute – Marko Arnautović for Austria against Italy
- Fastest yellow card after coming on as a substitute: 1 minute – Scott McKenna for Scotland against Croatia (introduced in the 33rd minute)
- Latest yellow card in a match without extra time: 90+5th minute – Rodri for Spain against Poland
- Latest yellow card in a match with extra time: 120+1st minute – Aleksandar Dragović for Austria against Italy, Artem Dovbyk for Ukraine against Sweden, Mario Gavranović for Switzerland against Spain
- Fastest dismissal from kick off: 55th minute – Ethan Ampadu for Wales against Italy, Matthijs de Ligt for Netherlands against Czech Republic
- Fastest dismissal of a substitute: 31 minutes – Harry Wilson for Wales against Denmark (introduced in the 59th minute)
- Latest dismissal in a match without extra time: 90th minute – Harry Wilson for Wales against Denmark
- Latest dismissal in a match with extra time: 99th minute – Marcus Danielson for Sweden against Ukraine
- Shortest time difference between two yellow cards given to the same player: 40 minutes – Grzegorz Krychowiak for Poland against Slovakia (booked in the 22nd minute and again in the 62nd minute)
- Most yellow cards (team): 12 – Italy
- Most red cards (team): 2 – Wales
- Fewest yellow cards (team): 3 – Netherlands, Scotland
- Most yellow cards (player): 3 – Grzegorz Krychowiak, Harry Maguire
- Most red cards (player): 1 – Grzegorz Krychowiak, Ethan Ampadu, Harry Wilson, Matthijs de Ligt, Marcus Danielson, Remo Freuler
- Most yellow cards (match): 7 – France vs Switzerland
- Most red cards (match): 1 – Poland vs Slovakia, Italy vs Wales, Wales vs Denmark, Netherlands vs Czech Republic, Sweden vs Ukraine, Switzerland vs Spain
- Fewest yellow cards (match): 0 – Belgium vs Russia, Scotland vs Czech Republic, Ukraine vs Austria, Finland vs Belgium, Ukraine vs England
- Most cards in one match: 7 – France vs Switzerland (7 yellow cards)

=== Sanctions ===
==== By match ====
Day	Home	Score	Away	Round	Referee	Total cards	Booked	(yellow card) (yellow-red card)	Sent off (straight red)
Group stage
Day 1	Turkey	0–3	Italy	Group A	(Netherlands) Danny Makkelie	2	2	0	0
Day 2	Wales	1–1	Switzerland	Group A	(France) Clément Turpin	3	3	0	0
Day 2	Denmark	0–1	Finland	Group B	(England) Anthony Taylor	2	2	0	0
Day 2	Belgium	3–0	Russia	Group B	(Spain) Antonio Mateu Lahoz	0	0	0	0
Day 3	England	1–0	Croatia	Group D	(Italy) Daniele Orsato	4	4	0	0
Day 3	Austria	3–1	North Macedonia	Group C	(Sweden) Andreas Ekberg	3	3	0	0
Day 3	Netherlands	3–2	Ukraine	Group C	(Germany) Felix Brych	1	1	0	0
Day 4	Scotland	0–2	Czech Republic	Group D	(Germany) Daniel Siebert	0	0	0	0
Day 4	Poland	1–2	Slovakia	Group E	(Romania) Ovidiu Hațegan	3	2	1	0
Day 4	Spain	0–0	Sweden	Group E	(Slovenia) Slavko Vinčić	1	1	0	0
Day 5	Hungary	0–3	Portugal	Group F	(Turkey) Cüneyt Çakır	3	3	0	0
Day 5	France	1–0	Germany	Group F	(Spain) Carlos del Cerro Grande	1	1	0	0
Day 6	Finland	0–1	Russia	Group B	(Netherlands) Danny Makkelie	5	5	0	0
Day 6	Turkey	0–2	Wales	Group A	(Portugal) Artur Soares Dias	4	4	0	0
Day 6	Italy	3–0	Switzerland	Group A	(Russia) Sergei Karasev	2	2	0	0
Day 7	Ukraine	2–1	North Macedonia	Group C	(Argentina) Fernando Rapallini	3	3	0	0
Day 7	Denmark	1–2	Belgium	Group B	(Netherlands) Björn Kuipers	4	4	0	0
Day 7	Netherlands	2–0	Austria	Group C	(Israel) Orel Grinfeld	3	3	0	0
Day 8	Sweden	1–0	Slovakia	Group E	(Germany) Daniel Siebert	4	4	0	0
Day 8	Croatia	1–1	Czech Republic	Group D	(Spain) Carlos del Cerro Grande	4	4	0	0
Day 8	England	0–0	Scotland	Group D	(Spain) Antonio Mateu Lahoz	2	2	0	0
Day 9	Hungary	1–1	France	Group F	(England) Michael Oliver	2	2	0	0
Day 9	Portugal	2–4	Germany	Group F	(England) Anthony Taylor	2	2	0	0
Day 9	Spain	1–1	Poland	Group E	(Italy) Daniele Orsato	6	6	0	0
Day 10	Italy	1–0	Wales	Group A	(Romania) Ovidiu Hațegan	4	3	0	1
Day 10	Switzerland	3–1	Turkey	Group A	(Slovenia) Slavko Vinčić	4	4	0	0
Day 11	Ukraine	0–1	Austria	Group C	(Turkey) Cüneyt Çakır	0	0	0	0
Day 11	North Macedonia	0–3	Netherlands	Group C	(Romania) István Kovács	4	4	0	0
Day 11	Finland	0–2	Belgium	Group B	(Germany) Felix Brych	0	0	0	0
Day 11	Russia	1–4	Denmark	Group B	(France) Clément Turpin	3	3	0	0
Day 12	Czech Republic	0–1	England	Group D	(Portugal) Artur Soares Dias	1	1	0	0
Day 12	Croatia	3–1	Scotland	Group D	(Argentina) Fernando Rapallini	2	2	0	0
Day 13	nbn	3–2	Poland	Group E	(England) Michael Oliver	3	3	0	0
Day 13	Slovakia	0–5	Spain	Group E	(Netherlands) Björn Kuipers	4	4	0	0
Day 13	Germany	2–2	Hungary	Group F	(Russia) Sergei Karasev	5	5	0	0
Day 13	Portugal	2–2	France	Group F	(Spain) Antonio Mateu Lahoz	4	4	0	0
Round of 16
Day 14	Wales	0–4	Denmark	Round of 16	(Germany) Daniel Siebert	5	4	0	1
Day 14	Italy	2–1 (a.e.t.)	Austria	Round of 16	(England) Anthony Taylor	5	5	0	0
Day 15	Netherlands	0–2	Czech Republic	Round of 16	(Russia) Sergei Karasev	4	3	0	1
Day 15	Belgium	1–0	Portugal	Round of 16	(Germany) Felix Brych	5	5	0	0
Day 16	Croatia	3–5 (a.e.t.)	Spain	Round of 16	(Turkey) Cüneyt Çakır	2	2	0	0
Day 16	France	3–3 (a.e.t.) (4–5 p)	Switzerland	Round of 16	(Argentina) Fernando Rapallini	7	7	0	0
Day 17	England	2–0	Germany	Round of 16	(Netherlands) Danny Makkelie	5	5	0	0
Day 17	Sweden	1–2 (a.e.t.)	Ukraine	Round of 16	(Italy) Daniele Orsato	5	4	0	1
Quarter-finals
Day 18	Switzerland	1–1 (a.e.t.) (1–3 p)	Spain	Quarter-finals	(England) Michael Oliver	4	3	0	1
Day 18	Belgium	1–2	Italy	Quarter-finals	(Slovenia) Slavko Vinčić	3	3	0	0
Day 19	Czech Republic	1–2	Denmark	Quarter-finals	(Netherlands) Björn Kuipers	2	2	0	0
Day 19	Ukraine	0–4	England	Quarter-finals	(Germany) Felix Brych	0	0	0	0
Semi-finals
Day 20	Italy	1–1 (a.e.t.) (4–2 p)	Spain	Semi-finals	(Germany) Felix Brych	3	3	0	0
Day 21	England	2–1 (a.e.t.)	Denmark	Semi-finals	(Netherlands) Danny Makkelie	2	2	0	0
Final
Day 22	Italy	1–1 (a.e.t.) (3–2 p)	England	Final	(Netherlands) Björn Kuipers	6	6	0	0

Source: UEFA

==== By referee ====
Referee	Nation	Pld	Red card	Yellow card	Pen.	Red cards
Felix Brych	Germany	5	0	8	0	—N/a
Cüneyt Çakır	Turkey	3	0	5	1	—N/a
Carlos del Cerro Grande	Spain	2	0	5	1	—N/a
Andreas Ekberg	Sweden	1	0	3	0	—N/a
Orel Grinfeld	Israel	1	0	3	1	—N/a
Ovidiu Hațegan	Romania	2	2	5	0	1 second yellow, 1 straight red
Sergei Karasev	Russia	3	1	10	0	1 straight red
István Kovács	Romania	1	0	4	0	—N/a
Björn Kuipers	Netherlands	4	0	16	1	—N/a
Danny Makkelie	Netherlands	4	0	14	1	—N/a
Antonio Mateu Lahoz	Spain	3	0	6	3	—N/a
Michael Oliver	England	3	1	8	0	1 straight red
Daniele Orsato	Italy	3	1	14	1	1 straight red
Fernando Rapallini	Argentina	3	0	12	3	—N/a
Daniel Siebert	Germany	3	1	8	1	1 straight red
Artur Soares Dias	Portugal	2	0	5	1	—N/a
Anthony Taylor	England	3	0	9	1	—N/a
Clément Turpin	France	2	0	6	1	—N/a
Slavko Vinčić	Slovenia	3	0	8	1	—N/a

Source: UEFA

==== By team ====
Team	Red card	Yellow card	Red cards	Suspensions
Austria	0	6	—N/a	Arnautović vs Netherlands
Belgium	0	4	—N/a	—N/a
Croatia	0	7	—N/a	Lovren vs Spain
Czech Republic	0	7	—N/a	Bořil vs Netherlands
Denmark	0	5	—N/a	—N/a
England	0	6	—N/a	—N/a
Finland	0	4	—N/a	—N/a
France	0	8	—N/a	—N/a
Germany	0	7	—N/a	—N/a
Hungary	0	6	—N/a	—N/a
Italy	0	12	—N/a	—N/a
Netherlands	1	3	De Ligt vs Czech Republic (straight red)	—N/a
North Macedonia	0	8	—N/a	—N/a
Poland	1	8	Krychowiak vs Slovakia (second booking)	Krychowiak vs Spain
Portugal	0	4	—N/a	—N/a
Russia	0	5	—N/a	—N/a
Scotland	0	3	—N/a	—N/a
Slovakia	0	6	—N/a	—N/a
Spain	0	6	—N/a	—N/a
Sweden	1	5	Danielson vs Ukraine (straight red)	—N/a
Switzerland	1	11	Freuler vs Spain (straight red)	Xhaka vs Spain
Turkey	0	7	—N/a	—N/a
Ukraine	0	4	—N/a	—N/a
Wales	2	9	Ampadu vs Italy (straight red); Wilson vs Denmark (straight red)	Ampadu vs Denmark

Source: UEFA

==== By individual ====
Player	Team	Red card	Yellow card	Suspended for match(es)
Grzegorz Krychowiak	Poland	1	3	vs Spain
Marcus Danielson	Sweden	1	1	—N/a
Ethan Ampadu	Wales	1	0	vs Denmark
Remo Freuler	Switzerland	1	0	—N/a
Matthijs de Ligt	Netherlands	1	0	—N/a
Harry Wilson	Wales	1	0	—N/a
Harry Maguire	England	0	3	—N/a
Ezgjan Alioski	North Macedonia	0	2	—N/a
Nicolò Barella	Italy	0	2	—N/a
Leonardo Bonucci	Italy	0	2	—N/a
Jan Bořil	Czech Republic	0	2	vs Netherlands
Endre Botka	Hungary	0	2	—N/a
Marcelo Brozović	Croatia	0	2	—N/a
Sergio Busquets	Spain	0	2	—N/a
Duje Ćaleta-Car	Croatia	0	2	—N/a
Hakan Çalhanoğlu	Turkey	0	2	—N/a
Ondrej Duda	Slovakia	0	2	—N/a
Mario Gavranović	Switzerland	0	2	—N/a
Matthias Ginter	Germany	0	2	—N/a
Dejan Lovren	Croatia	0	2	vs Spain
Kieffer Moore	Wales	0	2	—N/a
Benjamin Pavard	France	0	2	—N/a
Çağlar Söyüncü	Turkey	0	2	—N/a
Daniel Wass	Denmark	0	2	—N/a
Granit Xhaka	Switzerland	0	2	vs Spain
Manuel Akanji	Switzerland	0	1	—N/a
David Alaba	Austria	0	1	—N/a
Jordi Alba	Spain	0	1	—N/a
Toby Alderweireld	Belgium	0	1	—N/a
Joe Allen	Wales	0	1	—N/a
Marko Arnautović	Austria	0	1	vs Netherlands
Daniel Avramovski	North Macedonia	0	1	—N/a
Daniel Bachmann	Austria	0	1	—N/a
Gareth Bale	Wales	0	1	—N/a
Dmitri Barinov	Russia	0	1	—N/a
Domenico Berardi	Italy	0	1	—N/a
David Brooks	Wales	0	1	—N/a
Zeki Çelik	Turkey	0	1	—N/a
Giorgio Chiellini	Italy	0	1	—N/a
Kingsley Coman	France	0	1	—N/a
Vladimír Coufal	Czech Republic	0	1	—N/a
Diogo Dalot	Portugal	0	1	—N/a
Mikkel Damsgaard	Denmark	0	1	—N/a
Ben Davies	Wales	0	1	—N/a
Thomas Delaney	Denmark	0	1	—N/a
Halil Dervişoğlu	Turkey	0	1	—N/a
Giovanni Di Lorenzo	Italy	0	1	—N/a
Rúben Dias	Portugal	0	1	—N/a
Igor Diveyev	Russia	0	1	—N/a
Artem Dovbyk	Ukraine	0	1	—N/a
Aleksandar Dragović	Austria	0	1	—N/a
Martin Dúbravka	Slovakia	0	1	—N/a
Denzel Dumfries	Netherlands	0	1	—N/a
Georgi Dzhikiya	Russia	0	1	—N/a
Nico Elvedi	Switzerland	0	1	—N/a
Breel Embolo	Switzerland	0	1	—N/a
Attila Fiola	Hungary	0	1	—N/a
Phil Foden	England	0	1	—N/a
Emil Forsberg	Sweden	0	1	—N/a
Kamil Glik	Poland	0	1	—N/a
Robin Gosens	Germany	0	1	—N/a
Antoine Griezmann	France	0	1	—N/a
İlkay Gündoğan	Germany	0	1	—N/a
Chris Gunter	Wales	0	1	—N/a
Kai Havertz	Germany	0	1	—N/a
Thorgan Hazard	Belgium	0	1	—N/a
Lucas Hernandez	France	0	1	—N/a
Martin Hinteregger	Austria	0	1	—N/a
Adam Hložek	Czech Republic	0	1	—N/a
Tomáš Hubočan	Slovakia	0	1	—N/a
Lorenzo Insigne	Italy	0	1	—N/a
Mathias Jensen	Denmark	0	1	—N/a
Frenkie de Jong	Netherlands	0	1	—N/a
Jorginho	Italy	0	1	—N/a
Kamil Jóźwiak	Poland	0	1	—N/a
Tomáš Kalas	Czech Republic	0	1	—N/a
Glen Kamara	Finland	0	1	—N/a
Joshua Kimmich	Germany	0	1	—N/a
Presnel Kimpembe	France	0	1	—N/a
Mateusz Klich	Poland	0	1	—N/a
Tihomir Kostadinov	North Macedonia	0	1	—N/a
Mateo Kovačić	Croatia	0	1	—N/a
Michael Krmenčík	Czech Republic	0	1	—N/a
Fyodor Kudryashov	Russia	0	1	—N/a
Dejan Kulusevski	Sweden	0	1	—N/a
Stefan Lainer	Austria	0	1	—N/a
Aymeric Laporte	Spain	0	1	—N/a
Robert Lewandowski	Poland	0	1	—N/a
Hugo Lloris	France	0	1	—N/a
Robin Lod	Finland	0	1	—N/a
Mikael Lustig	Sweden	0	1	—N/a
Lukáš Masopust	Czech Republic	0	1	—N/a
Kevin Mbabu	Switzerland	0	1	—N/a
John McGinn	Scotland	0	1	—N/a
Chris Mepham	Wales	0	1	—N/a
Jakub Moder	Poland	0	1	—N/a
Visar Musliu	North Macedonia	0	1	—N/a
Loïc Négo	Hungary	0	1	—N/a
Stephen O'Donnell	Scotland	0	1	—N/a
Kristoffer Olsson	Sweden	0	1	—N/a
Willi Orbán	Hungary	0	1	—N/a
Daniel O'Shaughnessy	Finland	0	1	—N/a
Magomed Ozdoyev	Russia	0	1	—N/a
João Palhinha	Portugal	0	1	—N/a
Pepe	Portugal	0	1	—N/a
Matteo Pessina	Italy	0	1	—N/a
Kalvin Phillips	England	0	1	—N/a
Declan Rice	England	0	1	—N/a
Stefan Ristovski	North Macedonia	0	1	—N/a
Joe Rodon	Wales	0	1	—N/a
Rodri	Spain	0	1	—N/a
Ricardo Rodríguez	Switzerland	0	1	—N/a
Marten de Roon	Netherlands	0	1	—N/a
Leroy Sané	Germany	0	1	—N/a
Fabian Schär	Switzerland	0	1	—N/a
Mykola Shaparenko	Ukraine	0	1	—N/a
Milan Škriniar	Slovakia	0	1	—N/a
Tim Sparv	Finland	0	1	—N/a
Serhiy Sydorchuk	Ukraine	0	1	—N/a
Ádám Szalai	Hungary	0	1	—N/a
Youri Tielemans	Belgium	0	1	—N/a
Rafael Tolói	Italy	0	1	—N/a
Pau Torres	Spain	0	1	—N/a
Aleksandar Trajkovski	North Macedonia	0	1	—N/a
Raphaël Varane	France	0	1	—N/a
Darko Velkovski	North Macedonia	0	1	—N/a
Thomas Vermaelen	Belgium	0	1	—N/a
Marco Verratti	Italy	0	1	—N/a
Vladimír Weiss	Slovakia	0	1	—N/a
Silvan Widmer	Switzerland	0	1	—N/a
Andriy Yarmolenko	Ukraine	0	1	—N/a
Burak Yılmaz	Turkey	0	1	—N/a

Source: UEFA

== Overall statistics ==
Team	Pld	W	D	L	Pts	APts	GF	AGF	GA	AGA	GD	AGD	CS	ACS	YC	AYC	RC	ARC
Austria	4	2	0	2	6	1.50	5	1.25	5	1.25	0	0.00	1	0.25	6	1.50	0	0.00
Belgium	5	4	0	1	12	2.40	9	1.80	3	0.60	+6	1.20	3	0.60	4	0.80	0	0.00
Croatia	4	1	1	2	4	1.00	7	1.75	8	2.00	−1	−0.25	0	0.00	7	1.75	0	0.00
Czech Republic	5	2	1	2	7	1.40	6	1.20	4	0.80	+2	0.40	2	0.40	7	1.40	0	0.00
Denmark	6	3	0	**3**	9	1.50	12	2.00	7	1.17	+5	0.83	1	0.17	5	0.83	0	0.00
England	**7**	**5**	2	0	**17**	**2.43**	11	1.57	2	0.29	**+9**	**1.29**	**5**	**0.71**	6	0.86	0	0.00
Finland	3	1	0	2	3	1.00	1	0.33	3	1.00	−2	−0.67	1	0.33	4	1.33	0	0.00
France	4	1	3	0	6	1.50	7	1.75	6	1.50	+1	0.25	1	0.25	8	2.00	0	0.00
Germany	4	1	1	2	4	1.00	6	1.50	7	1.75	−1	−0.25	0	0.00	7	1.75	0	0.00
Hungary	3	0	2	1	2	0.67	3	1.00	6	2.00	−3	−1.00	0	0.00	6	2.00	0	0.00
**Italy**	**7**	**5**	2	0	**17**	**2.43**	**13**	1.86	4	0.57	**+9**	**1.29**	3	0.43	**12**	1.71	0	0.00
Netherlands	4	3	0	1	9	2.25	8	2.00	4	1.00	+4	1.00	2	0.50	3	0.75	1	0.25
North Macedonia	3	0	0	**3**	0	0.00	2	0.67	8	**2.67**	−6	−2.00	0	0.00	8	**2.67**	0	0.00
Poland	3	0	1	2	1	0.33	4	1.33	6	2.00	−2	−0.67	0	0.00	8	**2.67**	1	0.33
Portugal	4	1	1	2	4	1.00	7	1.75	7	1.75	0	0.00	1	0.25	4	1.00	0	0.00
Russia	3	1	0	2	3	1.00	2	0.67	7	2.33	−5	−1.67	1	0.33	5	1.67	0	0.00
Scotland	3	0	1	2	1	0.33	1	0.33	5	1.67	−4	−1.33	1	0.33	3	1.00	0	0.00
Slovakia	3	1	0	2	3	1.00	2	0.67	7	2.33	−5	−1.67	0	0.00	6	2.00	0	0.00
Spain	6	2	**4**	0	10	1.67	**13**	**2.17**	6	1.00	+7	1.17	2	0.33	6	1.00	0	0.00
Sweden	4	2	1	1	7	1.75	5	1.25	4	1.00	+1	0.25	2	0.50	5	1.25	1	0.25
Switzerland	5	1	3	1	6	1.20	8	1.60	9	1.80	−1	−0.20	0	0.00	11	2.20	1	0.20
Turkey	3	0	0	**3**	0	0.00	1	0.33	8	**2.67**	−7	−2.33	0	0.00	7	2.33	0	0.00
Ukraine	5	2	0	**3**	6	1.20	6	1.20	**10**	2.00	−4	−0.80	0	0.00	4	0.80	0	0.00
Wales	4	1	1	2	4	1.00	3	0.75	6	1.50	−3	−0.75	1	0.25	9	2.25	**2**	**0.50**
Total	51^{(1)}	39	12^{(2)}	39	141	1.38	142	1.39	142	1.39	0	0.00	27	0.26	151	1.48	6	0.06

Team(s) rendered in italics represent(s) the host nation(s). The competition's winning team is rendered in bold.
^{(1)} – Total games lost not counted in total games played (total games lost = total games won)
^{(2)} – Total number of games drawn (tied) for all teams = Total number of games drawn (tied) ÷ 2 (both teams involved)
^{(3)} – As per statistical convention in football, matches decided in extra time are counted as wins and losses, while matches decided by penalty shoot-outs are counted as draws.

Source: UEFA
