= North Macedonia at the UEFA European Championship =

International football delegation

North Macedonia have qualified once for a UEFA European Championship, the 2020 edition (played in 2021 due to the COVID-19 pandemic). They qualified after winning play-off path D; this meant they would appear in a major tournament finals for the first time in their history. At the tournament, the side competed in Group C, but were eliminated in the first round after losing all three of their matches.

== Euro 2020 ==
=== Group stage ===
Pos	Team	Pld	W	D	L	GF	GA	GD	Pts	Qualification
1	Netherlands (H)	3	3	0	0	8	2	+6	9	Advance to knockout stage
2	Austria	3	2	0	1	4	3	+1	6	Advance to knockout stage
3	Ukraine	3	1	0	2	4	5	−1	3	Advance to knockout stage
4	North Macedonia	3	0	0	3	2	8	−6	0	

Source: UEFA
Rules for classification: Group stage tiebreakers
(H) Hosts
13 June 2021
18:00 (19:00 UTC+3)

Austria	3–1	North Macedonia
Lainer 18'; Gregoritsch 78'; Arnautović 89'	Report	Pandev 28'

Arena Națională, Bucharest
Attendance: 9,082
Referee: Andreas Ekberg (Sweden)

17 June 2021
15:00 (16:00 UTC+3)

Ukraine	2–1	North Macedonia
Yarmolenko 29'; Yaremchuk 34'	Report	Alioski 57'

Arena Națională, Bucharest
Attendance: 10,001
Referee: Fernando Rapallini (Argentina)

21 June 2021
18:00

North Macedonia	0–3	Netherlands
	Report	Depay 24'; Wijnaldum 50', 58'

Johan Cruyff Arena, Amsterdam
Attendance: 15,227
Referee: István Kovács (Romania)

== Overall record ==
UEFA European Championship record									Qualification record						
Year	Round	Position	Pld	W	D	L	GF	GA	Pld	W	D	L	GF	GA	Position
(France) 1960 to (Sweden) 1992	Part of Yugoslavia								Part of Yugoslavia						
(England) 1996	Did not qualify								10	1	4	5	9	18	4/6
(Belgium) (Netherlands) 2000	Did not qualify								8	2	2	4	13	14	4/5
(Portugal) 2004	Did not qualify								8	1	3	4	11	14	4/5
(Austria) (Switzerland) 2008	Did not qualify								12	4	2	6	12	12	5/7
(Poland) (Ukraine) 2012	Did not qualify								10	2	2	6	8	14	5/6
(France) 2016	Did not qualify								10	1	1	8	6	18	6/6
(Europe) 2020	Group stage	23rd	3	0	0	3	2	8	12	6	2	4	15	14	3/6 (PO winners)
(Germany) 2024	Did not qualify								8	2	2	4	10	20	4/5
(United Kingdom) (Republic of Ireland) 2028	To be determined								To be determined						
(Italy) (Turkey) 2032	To be determined								To be determined						
Total	Group stage	1/8	3	0	0	3	2	8	79	19	18	41	84	124	—

== See also ==
- Serbia at the UEFA European Championship (records for Yugoslavia)

== Head-to-head record ==
Opponent	Pld	W	D	L	GF	GA	GD	Win %
Austria	1	0	0	1	1	3	−2	0.00
Netherlands	1	0	0	1	0	3	−3	0.00
Ukraine	1	0	0	1	1	2	−1	0.00
Total	3	0	0	3	2	8	−6	0.00
