= Poland national football team results (2020–present) =

2020 - present

- Win Draw Loss

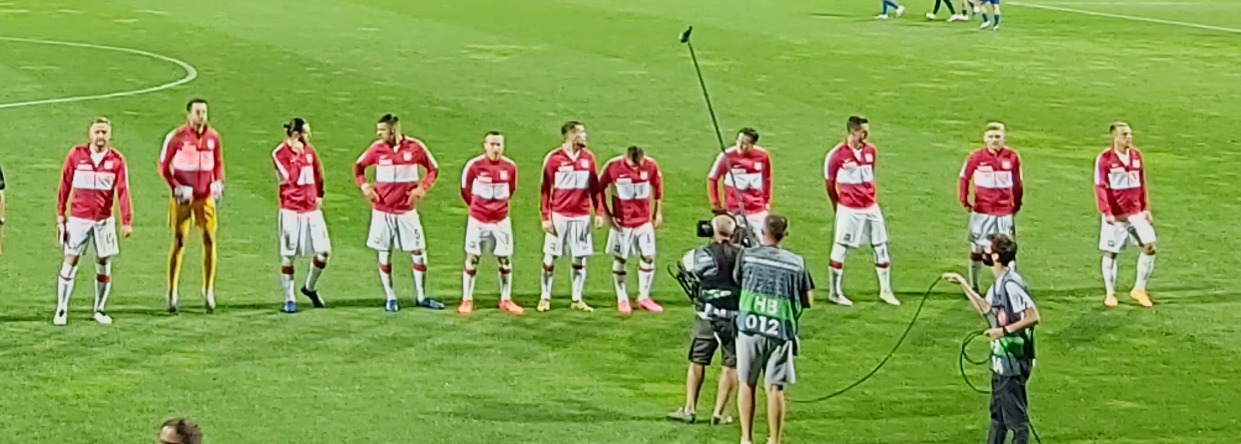
Poland team lining up before match against Bosnia and Herzegovina, 7 September 2020

This article provides details of international football games played by the Poland national football team from 2020 to present.

== Results ==
Key
Win
Draw
Defeat

=== 2020 ===
4 September 2020 2020–21 Nations League	Netherlands	1–0	Poland	Amsterdam, Netherlands
20:45 UTC+2	Bergwijn 61'; De Roon (yellow card) 71'; Depay (yellow card) 74'; De Jong (yellow card) 89'	Report	Piątek (yellow card) 21'; Klich (yellow card) 33'; Jóźwiak (yellow card) 56'; Glik (yellow card) 63'; Bednarek (yellow card) 90+2'	Stadium: Johan Cruyff Arena; Attendance: 0 (Note: Due to the COVID-19 pandemic in Europe, all matches scheduled for September 2020 were played behind closed doors.); Referee: Anastasios Sidiropoulos (Greece)

7 September 2020 2020–21 Nations League	Bosnia and Herzegovina	1–2	Poland	Zenica, Bosnia and Herzegovina
20:45 UTC+2	Hajradinović 24' (pen.)	Report	Glik 45'; Grosicki 67'	Stadium: Bilino Polje; Attendance: 0 Referee: Cüneyt Çakır (Turkey)

7 October 2020 Friendly	Poland	5–1	Finland	Gdańsk, Poland
20:45 UTC+2	Grosicki 9', 18', 38'; Piątek 53'; Milik 87'	Report	Niskanen 68'	Stadium: Stadion Energa Gdańsk; Attendance: 3,000; Referee: Michal Ocenáš (Slovakia)
Note: The match was originally scheduled for 27 March 2020, but postponed due to the COVID-19 pandemic in Poland.

11 October 2020 2020–21 Nations League	Poland	0–0	Italy	Gdańsk, Poland
20:45 UTC+2		Report		Stadium: Stadion Energa Gdańsk; Attendance: 9,200; Referee: José María Sánchez Martínez (Spain)

14 October 2020 2020–21 Nations League	Poland	3–0	Bosnia and Herzegovina	Wrocław, Poland
20:45 UTC+2	Lewandowski 40', 51'; Linetty 45+1'	Report		Stadium: Stadion Miejski; Attendance: 8,152; Referee: Craig Pawson (England)

11 November 2020 Friendly	Poland	2–0	Ukraine	Chorzów, Poland
20:45 UTC+1	Piątek 40'; Moder 63'	Report		Stadium: Silesian Stadium; Attendance: 0 Referee: Manuel Schüttengruber (Austria)
Note: The match was originally scheduled for 31 March 2020, but postponed due to the COVID-19 pandemic in Poland.

15 November 2020 2020–21 Nations League	Italy	2–0	Poland	Reggio Emilia, Italy
20:45 UTC+1	Jorginho 27' (pen.); Berardi 84'	Report		Stadium: Stadio Città del Tricolore; Attendance: 0 Referee: Clément Turpin (France)

18 November 2020 2020–21 Nations League	Poland	1–2	Netherlands	Chorzów, Poland
20:45 UTC+1	Jóźwiak 6'	Report	Depay 77' (pen.); Wijnaldum 84'	Stadium: Silesian Stadium; Attendance: 0 Referee: Orel Grinfeld (Israel)

=== 2021 ===
25 March 2021 2022 World Cup qualification	Hungary	3–3	Poland	Budapest, Hungary
20:45 UTC+1	Fiola (yellow card) 8' (yellow-red card) 90+4'; Sallai 6'; Szalai 53'; Lang (yellow card) 73'; Orbán 78'; Nagy (yellow card) 80'; Szalai (yellow card) 87'	Report	Helik (yellow card) 34'; Bereszyński (yellow card) 49'; Piątek 60'; Jóźwiak 61'; Lewandowski 83'	Stadium: Puskás Aréna; Attendance: 0 Referee: Felix Brych (Germany)

28 March 2021 2022 World Cup qualification	Poland	3–0	Andorra	Warsaw, Poland
20:45 UTC+2	Lewandowski 30', 55'; Świderski 88'	Report		Stadium: Stadion Wojska Polskiego; Attendance: 0 Referee: Erik Lambrechts (Belgium)

31 March 2021 2022 World Cup qualification	England	2–1	Poland	London, England
19:45 UTC+1	Kane 19' (pen.); Maguire 85'	Report	Moder 58'	Stadium: Wembley Stadium; Attendance: 0 Referee: Björn Kuipers (Netherlands)

1 June 2021 Friendly	Poland	1–1	Russia	Wrocław, Poland
20:45 UTC+2	Świerczok 4'	Report	Karavayev 21'	Stadium: Stadion Miejski; Attendance: 19,297; Referee: Marco Guida (Italy)

8 June 2021 Friendly	Poland	2–2	Iceland	Poznań, Poland
18:00 UTC+2	Zieliński 34'; Świderski 88'	Report	Guðmundsson 24'; Br. Bjarnason 47'	Stadium: Stadion Miejski; Attendance: 19,614; Referee: Balázs Berke (Hungary)

14 June 2021 UEFA Euro 2020 Group E	Poland	1–2	Slovakia	Saint Petersburg, Russia
19:00 UTC+3	Krychowiak (yellow card) 22' (yellow-red card) 62'; Linetty 46'	Report	Szczęsny 18' (o.g.); Hubočan (yellow card) 20'; Škriniar 69'	Stadium: Krestovsky Stadium; Attendance: 12,862; Referee: Ovidiu Hațegan (Romania)

19 June 2021 UEFA Euro 2020 Group E	Spain	1–1	Poland	Seville, Spain
21:00 UTC+2	Morata 25'; Gerard (penalty missed) 58'; P. Torres (yellow card) 81'; Rodri (yellow card) 90+5'	Report	Klich (yellow card) 36'; Lewandowski 54', (yellow card) 90+3'; Moder (yellow card) 57'; Jóźwiak (yellow card) 59'	Stadium: La Cartuja; Attendance: 11,732; Referee: Daniele Orsato (Italy)

23 June 2021 UEFA Euro 2020 Group E	Sweden	3–2	Poland	Saint Petersburg, Russia
19:00 UTC+3	Forsberg 2', 59'; Claesson 90+4'	Report	Lewandowski 61', 84'	Stadium: Krestovsky Stadium; Attendance: 14,252; Referee: Michael Oliver (England)

2 September 2021 2022 World Cup qualification	Poland	4–1	Albania	Warsaw, Poland
20:45 UTC+2	Lewandowski 12'; Buksa 44'; Krychowiak 54'; Linetty 89'	Report	Cikalleshi 25'	Stadium: National Stadium; Attendance: 38,254; Referee: Maurizio Marani (Italy)

5 September 2021 2022 World Cup qualification	San Marino	1–7	Poland	Serravalle, San Marino
20:45 UTC+2	Nanni 48'	Report	Lewandowski 5', 21'; Świderski 16'; Linetty 44'; Buksa 67', 90+2', 90+4'	Stadium: San Marino Stadium; Attendance: 500; Referee: Mattias Gestranius (Finland)

8 September 2021 2022 World Cup qualification	Poland	1–1	England	Warsaw, Poland
20:45 UTC+2	Szymański 90+2'	Report	Kane 72'	Stadium: National Stadium; Attendance: 56,212; Referee: Daniel Siebert (Germany)

9 October 2021 2022 World Cup qualification	Poland	5–0	San Marino	Warsaw, Poland
20:45 UTC+2	Świderski 10'; Brolli 20' (o.g.); Kędziora 50'; Buksa 84'; Piątek 90+1'	Report		Stadium: PGE Narodowy; Attendance: 56,128; Referee: Fran Jović (Croatia)

12 October 2021 2022 World Cup qualification	Albania	0–1	Poland	Tirana, Albania
20:45 UTC+2		Report	Świderski 77'	Stadium: Arena Kombëtare; Attendance: 21,000; Referee: Clément Turpin (France)

12 November 2021 2022 World Cup qualification	Andorra	1–4	Poland	Andorra la Vella, Andorra
20:45 UTC+1	Vales 45'	Report	Lewandowski 5', 73'; Jóźwiak 11'; Milik 45+2'	Stadium: Estadi Nacional; Attendance: 1,049; Referee: John Beaton (Scotland)

15 November 2021 2022 World Cup qualification	Poland	1–2	Hungary	Warsaw, Poland
20:45 UTC+1	Świderski 61'	Report	Schäfer 37'; Gazdag 80'	Stadium: National Stadium; Attendance: 56,197; Referee: Tiago Martins (Portugal)

=== 2022 ===
2022 World Cup qualification play-offs	Russia (Note: On 2 May 2022, UEFA announced that Russia were suspended and automatically relegated to League C due to their country's invasion of Ukraine.)	w/o	Poland	Moscow, Russia
		Report		Stadium: VTB Arena (Note: The Russia v Poland match, originally scheduled to be played at Luzhniki Stadium, Moscow, was later moved on 2 February 2022 to VTB Arena, Moscow, due to the epidemiological situation in Moscow and the possible limitations associated with it.)
Note: The match was to be played on 24 March 2022. The Russia v Poland match, originally scheduled to be played at Luzhniki Stadium, Moscow, was later moved on 2 February 2022 to VTB Arena, Moscow, due to the epidemiological situation in Moscow and the possible limitations associated with it. Due to the Russian invasion of Ukraine, Russia were suspended, and Poland advanced to the final on a walkover.

24 March 2022 Friendly	Scotland	1–1	Poland	Glasgow, Scotland
19:45 UTC+0	Tierney 68'	Report	Piątek 90+4' (pen.)	Stadium: Hampden Park; Attendance: 39,090; Referee: Robert Hennessy (Ireland)

29 March 2022 2022 World Cup qualification play-offs	Poland	2–0	Sweden	Chorzów, Poland
20:45 UTC+2	Lewandowski 50' (pen.); Zieliński 72'	Report		Stadium: Stadion Śląski (Note: The potential final match hosted by Poland, originally scheduled to be played at Stadion Narodowy, Warsaw, was later moved on 19 January 2022 to Stadion Śląski, Chorzów, due to the presence of a temporary hospital at the Stadion Narodowy.); Attendance: 54,078; Referee: Daniele Orsato (Italy)

1 June 2022 2022–23 Nations League	Poland	2–1	Wales	Wrocław, Poland
20:45 UTC+2	Kamiński 72'; Świderski 85'	Report	J. Williams 52'	Stadium: Stadion Wrocław; Attendance: 35,214; Referee: Rade Obrenovič (Slovenia)

8 June 2022 2022–23 Nations League	Belgium	6–1	Poland	Brussels, Belgium
20:45 UTC+2	Witsel 42'; De Bruyne 59'; Trossard 73', 80'; Dendoncker 84'; Openda 90+3'	Report	Lewandowski 28'	Stadium: King Baudouin Stadium; Attendance: 27,409; Referee: Ivan Kružliak (Slovakia)

11 June 2022 2022–23 Nations League	Netherlands	2–2	Poland	Rotterdam, Netherlands
20:45 UTC+2	Klaassen 51'; Dumfries 54'	Report	Cash 18'; Zieliński 49'	Stadium: De Kuip; Attendance: 39,382; Referee: Halil Umut Meler (Turkey)

14 June 2022 2022–23 Nations League	Poland	0–1	Belgium	Warsaw, Poland
20:45 UTC+2		Report	Batshuayi 16'	Stadium: Stadion Narodowy; Attendance: 56,803; Referee: Irfan Peljto (Bosnia and Herzegovina)

22 September 2022 2022–23 Nations League	Poland	0–2	Netherlands	Warsaw, Poland
20:45 UTC+2		Report	Gakpo 13'; Bergwijn 60'	Stadium: Stadion Narodowy; Attendance: 56,673; Referee: Alejandro Hernández Hernández (Spain)

25 September 2022 2022–23 Nations League	Wales	0–1	Poland	Cardiff, Wales
19:45 UTC+1		Report	Świderski 58'	Stadium: Cardiff City Stadium; Attendance: 31,520; Referee: Andris Treimanis (Latvia)

16 November 2022 Friendly	Poland	1–0	Chile	Warsaw, Poland
18:00 UTC+1	Piątek 85'	Report		Stadium: Stadion Wojska Polskiego; Attendance: 28,000; Referee: Harm Osmers (Germany)

22 November 2022 2022 World Cup Group C	Mexico	0–0	Poland	Doha, Qatar
19:00 UTC+3		Report		Stadium: Stadium 974; Attendance: 39,369; Referee: Chris Beath (Australia)

26 November 2022 2022 World Cup Group C	Poland	2–0	Saudi Arabia	Al Rayyan, Qatar
16:00 UTC+3	Zieliński 39'; Lewandowski 82'	Report		Stadium: Education City Stadium; Attendance: 44,259; Referee: Wilton Sampaio (Brazil)

30 November 2022 2022 World Cup Group C	Poland	0–2	Argentina	Doha, Qatar
22:00 UTC+3		Report	Mac Allister 46'; Álvarez 67'	Stadium: Stadium 974; Attendance: 44,089; Referee: Danny Makkelie (Netherlands)

4 December 2022 2022 World Cup Round of 16	France	3–1	Poland	Doha, Qatar
18:00 UTC+3	Giroud 44'; Mbappé 74', 90+1'	Report	Lewandowski 90+9' (pen.)	Stadium: Al Thumama Stadium; Attendance: 40,989; Referee: Jesús Valenzuela (Venezuela)

=== 2023 ===
24 March 2023 UEFA Euro 2024 qualifying	Czech Republic	3–1	Poland	Prague, Czech Republic
20:45	Krejčí 1'; Čvančara 3'; Kuchta 64'	Report	Szymański 87'	Stadium: Fortuna Arena; Attendance: 19,045; Referee: Anastasios Sidiropoulos (Greece)

27 March 2023 UEFA Euro 2024 qualifying	Poland	1–0	Albania	Warsaw, Poland
20:45	Świderski 41'	Report		Stadium: Stadion Narodowy; Attendance: 56,227; Referee: Slavko Vinčić (Slovenia)

16 June 2023 Friendly	Poland	1–0	Germany	Warsaw, Poland
20:45 UTC+2	Kiwior 31'	Report		Stadium: Stadion Narodowy; Attendance: 57,098; Referee: Orel Grinfeld (Israel)

20 June 2023 UEFA Euro 2024 qualifying	Moldova	3–2	Poland	Chișinău, Moldova
20:45	Nicolaescu 48', 79'; Babohlo 85'	Report	Milik 12'; Lewandowski 34'	Stadium: Zimbru Stadium; Attendance: 9,442; Referee: Filip Glova (Slovakia)

7 September 2023 UEFA Euro 2024 qualifying	Poland	2–0	Faroe Islands	Warsaw, Poland
20:45	Lewandowski 73' (pen.), 83'	Report		Stadium: Stadion Narodowy; Attendance: 54,129; Referee: David Smajc (Slovenia)

10 September 2023 UEFA Euro 2024 qualifying	Albania	2–0	Poland	Tirana, Albania
20:45	Asani 37'; Daku 62'	Report		Stadium: Arena Kombëtare; Attendance: 22,785; Referee: José María Sánchez Martínez (Spain)

12 October 2023 UEFA Euro 2024 qualifying	Faroe Islands	0–2	Poland	Tórshavn, Faroe Islands
20:45		Report	S. Szymański 4'; Buksa 65'	Stadium: Tórsvøllur; Attendance: 3,220; Referee: Allard Lindhout (Netherlands)

15 October 2023 UEFA Euro 2024 qualifying	Poland	1–1	Moldova	Warsaw, Poland
20:45	Świderski 53'	Report	Nicolaescu 26'	Stadium: Stadion Narodowy; Attendance: 51,672; Referee: Artur Soares Dias (Portugal)

17 November 2023 UEFA Euro 2024 qualifying	Poland	1–1	Czech Republic	Warsaw, Poland
20:45	Piotrowski 38'	Report	Souček 49'	Stadium: Stadion Narodowy; Attendance: 56,310; Referee: Daniele Orsato (Italy)

21 November 2023 Friendly	Poland	2–0	Latvia	Warsaw, Poland
21:45 UTC+2	Frankowski 7'; Lewandowski 49'	Report		Stadium: Stadion Narodowy; Attendance: 31,000; Referee: Ondrej Berka (Czech Republic)

=== 2024 ===
21 March 2024 UEFA Euro 2024 qualifying play-offs	Poland	5–1	Estonia	Warsaw, Poland
20:45	Frankowski 22'; Zieliński 50'; Piotrowski 70'; Mets 74' (o.g.); S. Szymański 76'	Report	Vetkal 78'	Stadium: Stadion Narodowy; Attendance: 53,868; Referee: Slavko Vinčić (Slovenia)

26 March 2024 UEFA Euro 2024 qualifying play-offs	Wales	0–0 (a.e.t.) (4–5 p)	Poland	Cardiff, Wales
19:45	Mepham (yellow card) 98' (yellow-red card) 120+1'	UEFA report		Stadium: Cardiff City Stadium; Attendance: 31,876; Referee: Daniele Orsato (Italy)
	Penalties
	Davies (penalty scored); Moore (penalty scored); Wilson (penalty scored); Williams (penalty scored); James (penalty missed)		(penalty scored) Lewandowski; (penalty scored) Szymański; (penalty scored) Frankowski; (penalty scored) Zalewski; (penalty scored) Piątek

7 June 2024 Friendly	Poland	3–1	Ukraine	Warsaw, Poland
20:45	Walukiewicz 11'; Zieliński 16'; Romanczuk 30'	Report	Dovbyk 41'	Stadium: Stadion Narodowy; Attendance: 47,013; Referee: Andrew Madley (England)

10 June 2024 Friendly	Poland	2–1	Turkey	Warsaw, Poland
20:45	Świderski 12'; Zalewski 90'	Report	Yılmaz 77'	Stadium: Stadion Narodowy; Attendance: 48,677; Referee: Balázs Berke (Hungary)

16 June 2024 UEFA Euro 2024 Group D	Poland	1–2	Netherlands	Hamburg, Germany
15:00	Buksa 16'	Report	Gakpo 29'; Weghorst 83'	Stadium: Volksparkstadion; Attendance: 48,117; Referee: Artur Soares Dias (Portugal)

21 June 2024 UEFA Euro 2024 Group D	Poland	1–3	Austria	Berlin, Germany
18:00	Piątek 30'	Report	Trauner 9'; Baumgartner 66'; Arnautović 78' (pen.)	Stadium: Olympiastadion; Attendance: 69,455; Referee: Halil Umut Meler (Turkey)

25 June 2024 UEFA Euro 2024 Group D	France	1–1	Poland	Dortmund, Germany
18:00	Mbappé 56' (pen.)	Report	Lewandowski 79' (pen.)	Stadium: Westfalenstadion; Attendance: 59,728; Referee: Marco Guida (Italy)

5 September 2024 2024–25 Nations League	Scotland	2–3	Poland	Glasgow, Scotland
20:45 (19:45 UTC+1)	Gilmour 46'; McTominay 76'	Report	Szymański 8'; Lewandowski 44' (pen.); Zalewski 90+7' (pen.)	Stadium: Hampden Park, Glasgow; Attendance: 46,356; Referee: Glenn Nyberg (Sweden)

8 September 2024 2024–25 Nations League	Croatia	1–0	Poland	Osijek, Croatia
20:45	Modrić 52'	Report		Stadium: Opus Arena; Attendance: 12,612; Referee: François Letexier (France)

12 October 2024 2024–25 Nations League	Poland	1–3	Portugal	Warsaw, Poland
20:45 CEST (UTC+2)	Zieliński 78'	Report	Silva 26'; Ronaldo 37'; Bednarek 88' (o.g.)	Stadium: Stadion Narodowy; Attendance: 56,854; Referee: Serdar Gözübüyük (Netherlands)

15 October 2024 2024–25 Nations League	Poland	3–3	Croatia	Warsaw, Poland
20:45	Zieliński 5'; Zalewski 45'; Szymański 68'	Report	Sosa 19'; Sučić 24'; Baturina 26'; Livaković (red card) 76'	Stadium: Stadion Narodowy; Attendance: 56,103; Referee: Alejandro Hernández Hernández (Spain)

15 November 2024 2024–25 Nations League	Portugal	5–1	Poland	Porto, Portugal
19:45 WET (UTC±0)	Leão 59'; Ronaldo 72' (pen.), 87'; Fernandes 80'; Neto 83'	Report	Marczuk 88'	Stadium: Estádio do Dragão; Attendance: 47,239; Referee: Donatas Rumšas (Lithuania)

18 November 2024 2024–25 Nations League	Poland	1–2	Scotland	Warsaw, Poland
20:45 CET (UTC+1)	Piątkowski 59'	Report	McGinn 3'; Robertson 90+3'	Stadium: National Stadium; Attendance: 55,433; Referee: Christian Dingert (Germany)

=== 2025 ===
21 March 2025 2026 World Cup qualification	Poland	1–0	Lithuania	Warsaw, Poland
20:45 CET (UTC+1)	Lewandowski 81'	Report		Stadium: National Stadium; Attendance: 55,738; Referee: Tasos Sidiropoulos (Greece)

24 March 2025 2026 World Cup qualification	Poland	2–0	Malta	Warsaw, Poland
20:45 CET (UTC+1)	Świderski 27', 51'	Report		Stadium: National Stadium; Attendance: 45,872; Referee: Morten Krogh (Denmark)

6 June 2025 Friendly	Poland	2–0	Moldova	Chorzów, Poland
20:45 CEST (UTC+2)	Cash 30'; Slisz 88'			Stadium: Stadion Śląski; Attendance: 36,357; Referee: David Dickinson (Scotland)

10 June 2025 2026 World Cup qualification	Finland	2–1	Poland	Helsinki, Finland
21:45 EEST (UTC+3)	Pohjanpalo 31' (pen.); Källman 64'	Report	Kiwior 69'	Stadium: Helsinki Olympic Stadium; Attendance: 16,511; Referee: João Pinheiro (Portugal)

4 September 2025 2026 World Cup qualification	Netherlands	1–1	Poland	Rotterdam, Netherlands
20:45 CEST (UTC+2)	Dumfries 28'	Report	Cash 80'	Stadium: De Kuip; Attendance: 40,904; Referee: Simone Sozza (Italy)

7 September 2025 2026 World Cup qualification	Poland	3–1	Finland	Chorzów, Poland
20:45 CEST (UTC+1)	Cash 27'; Lewandowski 45+2'; Kamiński 54'	Report	Källman 88'	Stadium: Stadion Śląski; Attendance: 50,897; Referee: Rade Obrenović (Slovenia)

9 October 2025 Friendly	Poland	1–0	New Zealand	Chorzów, Poland
20:45 CEST (UTC+2)	Zieliński 49'	Report		Stadium: Stadion Śląski; Attendance: 30,412; Referee: Erik Lambrechts (Belgium)

12 October 2025 2026 World Cup qualification	Lithuania	0–2	Poland	Kaunas, Lithuania
21:45 EEST (UTC+3)		Report	Szymański 15'; Lewandowski 64'	Stadium: Darius and Girėnas Stadium; Attendance: 11,741; Referee: Ondřej Berka (Czech Republic)

14 November 2025 2026 World Cup qualification	Poland	1–1	Netherlands	Warsaw, Poland
20:45 CET (UTC+1)	Kamiński 43'	Report	Depay 47'	Stadium: National Stadium; Attendance: 56,278; Referee: Maurizio Mariani (Italy)

17 November 2025 2026 World Cup qualification	Malta	2–3	Poland	Ta' Qali, Malta
20:45 CET (UTC+1)	Cardona 36'; Teuma 68' (pen.)	Report	Lewandowski 32'; Wszołek 59'; Zieliński 85'	Stadium: National Stadium; Attendance: 10,326; Referee: Igor Pajač (Croatia)

=== 2026 ===
26 March 2026 2026 World Cup qualification play-offs	Poland	2–1	Albania	Warsaw, Poland
20:45 CET (UTC+1)	Lewandowski 63'; Zieliński 73'	Report	Hoxha 42'	Stadium: Stadion Narodowy; Attendance: 56,412; Referee: Anthony Taylor (England)

31 March 2026 2026 World Cup qualification play-offs	Sweden	3–2	Poland	Solna, Sweden
20:45 CEST (UTC+2)	Elanga 20'; Lagerbielke 44'; Gyökeres 88'	Report	Zalewski 33'; Świderski 55'	Stadium: Nationalarenan; Attendance: 49,627; Referee: Slavko Vinčić (Slovenia)

31 May 2026 Friendly	Poland	0–2	Ukraine	Wrocław, Poland
17:30 CEST (UTC+2)		Report	Yaremchuk 34'; Yarmolenko 44'	Stadium: Wrocław Stadium; Attendance: 37,904; Referee: Filip Glova (Slovakia)

3 June 2026 Friendly	Poland	2–2	Nigeria	Warsaw, Poland
20:45 CEST (UTC+2)	Potulski 45+1'; Wiśniewski 90+5'	Report	Moffi 23'; Onuachu 77' (pen.)	Stadium: Stadion Narodowy; Attendance: 54,408; Referee: Marian Barbu (Romania)

25 September 2026 2026–27 Nations League	Poland	0–0	Bosnia and Herzegovina	Warsaw, Poland
20:45 CEST (UTC+2)		Report		Stadium: Stadion Narodowy; Attendance: 46,775; Referee: Anastasios Papapetrou (Greece)

28 September 2026 2026–27 Nations League	Sweden	3–1	Poland	Solna, Sweden
20:45 CEST (UTC+2)	Nygren 8'; Ayari 63'; Gyökeres 72'	Report	Szymański 43'	Stadium: Nationalarenan; Attendance: 24,637; Referee: Javier Alberola Rojas (Spain)

2 October 2026 2026–27 Nations League	Poland	6–0	Romania	Warsaw, Poland
20:45 CEST (UTC+2)	Lewandowski 24' (pen.), 47', 86'; Ghiță (o.g.); Zieliński 62'; Bednarek 66'	Report		Stadium: Stadion Narodowy; Attendance: 51,054; Referee: Urs Schnyder (Switzerland)

5 October 2026 2026–27 Nations League	Bosnia and Herzegovina	1–0	Poland	Zenica, Bosnia and Herzegovina
20:45 CEST (UTC+2)	Bašić 84' (pen.)	Report		Stadium: Bilino Polje Stadium; Attendance: 11,700; Referee: Jeremie Pignard (France)

14 November 2026 2026–27 Nations League	Romania	2–1	Poland	Bucharest, Romania
21:45 CEST (UTC+2)	Cicâldău 68'; Man 72'	Report	Reguła 82'	Stadium: Arena Națională; Attendance: 45,827; Referee: Sebastian Gishamer (Austria)

17 November 2026 2026–27 UEFA Nations League	Poland	1–1	Sweden	Wrocław, Poland
20:45 CET (UTC+1)	Benedyczak 16'	Report	Larsson 24'	Stadium: Wrocław Stadium; Attendance: 38,516; Referee: Felix Zwayer (Germany)

== Head to head records ==
As of match played 17 November 2026

Head to head records
Opponent	P	W	D	L	GF	GA	W%	D%	L%
Albania	5	4	0	1	8	4	80	0	20
Andorra	2	2	0	0	7	1	100	0	0
Argentina	1	0	0	1	0	2	0	0	100
Austria	1	0	0	1	1	3	0	0	100
Belgium	2	0	0	2	1	7	0	0	100
Bosnia and Herzegovina	4	2	1	1	5	2	50	25	25
Chile	1	1	0	0	1	0	100	0	0
Croatia	2	0	1	1	3	4	0	50	50
Czech Republic	2	0	1	1	2	4	0	50	50
England	2	0	1	1	2	3	0	50	50
Estonia	1	1	0	0	5	1	100	0	0
Faroe Islands	2	2	0	0	4	0	100	0	0
Finland	3	2	0	1	9	4	66.67	0	33.33
France	2	0	1	1	2	4	0	50	50
Germany	1	1	0	0	1	0	100	0	0
Hungary	2	0	1	1	4	5	0	50	50
Iceland	1	0	1	0	2	2	0	100	0
Italy	2	0	1	1	0	2	0	50	50
Latvia	1	1	0	0	2	0	100	0	0
Lithuania	2	2	0	0	3	0	100	0	0
Malta	2	2	0	0	5	2	100	0	0
Mexico	1	0	1	0	0	0	0	100	0
Moldova	3	1	1	1	5	4	33.33	33.33	33.33
Netherlands	8	0	4	4	7	12	0	50	50
New Zealand	1	1	0	0	1	0	100	0	0
Nigeria	1	0	1	0	2	2	0	100	0
Portugal	2	0	0	2	2	8	0	0	100
Romania	2	1	0	1	7	2	50	0	50
Russia	1	0	1	0	1	1	0	100	0
San Marino	2	2	0	0	12	1	100	0	0
Saudi Arabia	1	1	0	0	2	0	100	0	0
Scotland	3	1	1	1	5	5	33.33	33.33	33.33
Slovakia	1	0	0	1	1	2	0	0	100
Spain	1	0	1	0	1	1	0	100	0
Sweden	5	1	1	3	8	10	20	20	60
Turkey	1	1	0	0	2	1	100	0	0
Ukraine	3	2	0	1	5	3	66.67	0	33.33
Wales	3	2	1	0	3	1	66.67	33.33	0
Totals	80	33	20	27	131	103	41.25	25	33.75
