= UEFA Euro 2020 Group C =

Football tournament group stage

Group C of UEFA Euro 2020 took place from 13 to 21 June 2021 in Amsterdam's Johan Cruyff Arena and Bucharest's Arena Națională. The group contained host nation the Netherlands, Ukraine, Austria and North Macedonia.

== Teams ==
Draw position	Team	Pot	Method of qualification	Date of qualification	Finals appearance	Last appearance	Previous best performance	Qualifying Rankings November 2019 (Note: The European Qualifiers overall rankings from November 2019 were used for seeding for the final draw.)	FIFA Rankings May 2021
C1	Netherlands (host)	2	Group C runner-up	16 November 2019	10th	2012	Winners (1988)	11	16
C2	Ukraine	1	Group B winner	14 October 2019	3rd	2016	Group stage (2012, 2016)	6	24
C3	Austria	3	Group G runner-up	16 November 2019	3rd	2016	Group stage (2008, 2016)	16	23
C4	North Macedonia	4	Play-off Path D winner	12 November 2020	1st	—	Debut	30	62

== Standings ==
Pos	Team	Pld	W	D	L	GF	GA	GD	Pts	Qualification
1	Netherlands (H)	3	3	0	0	8	2	+6	9	Advance to knockout stage
2	Austria	3	2	0	1	4	3	+1	6	Advance to knockout stage
3	Ukraine	3	1	0	2	4	5	−1	3	Advance to knockout stage
4	North Macedonia	3	0	0	3	2	8	−6	0	

Source: UEFA
Rules for classification: Group stage tiebreakers
(H) Hosts

In the round of 16,

- The winner of Group C, the Netherlands, advanced to play the third-placed team of Group D, the Czech Republic.
- The runner-up of Group C, Austria, advanced to play the winner of Group A, Italy.
- The third-placed team of Group C, Ukraine, advanced as one of the four best third-placed teams to play the winner of Group E, Sweden.

== Matches ==
=== Austria vs North Macedonia ===
13 June 2021
18:00 (19:00 UTC+3)

Austria	3–1	North Macedonia
Lainer 18'; Gregoritsch 78'; Arnautović 89'	Report	Pandev 28'

Arena Națională, Bucharest
Attendance: 9,082
Referee: Andreas Ekberg (Sweden)

Austria	North Macedonia

GK	13	Daniel Bachmann
RB	21	Stefan Lainer	(yellow card) 85'
CB	3	Aleksandar Dragović		(substituted off) 46'
CB	4	Martin Hinteregger
LB	2	Andreas Ulmer
RM	19	Christoph Baumgartner		(substituted off) 58'
CM	24	Konrad Laimer		(substituted off) 90+3'
CM	23	Xaver Schlager		(substituted off) 90+4'
LM	8	David Alaba (c)
AM	9	Marcel Sabitzer
CF	25	Saša Kalajdžić		(substituted off) 59'
Substitutions:
DF	15	Philipp Lienhart		(substituted on) 46'
FW	11	Michael Gregoritsch		(substituted on) 58'
FW	7	Marko Arnautović		(substituted on) 59'
MF	14	Julian Baumgartlinger		(substituted on) 90+3'
MF	6	Stefan Ilsanker		(substituted on) 90+4'
Manager:
(Germany) Franco Foda

GK	1	Stole Dimitrievski
CB	13	Stefan Ristovski
CB	14	Darko Velkovski
CB	6	Visar Musliu		(substituted off) 86'
RWB	16	Boban Nikolov		(substituted off) 63'
LWB	8	Ezgjan Alioski	(yellow card) 52'
CM	17	Enis Bardhi		(substituted off) 82'
CM	5	Arijan Ademi
CM	21	Eljif Elmas
CF	10	Goran Pandev (c)
CF	9	Aleksandar Trajkovski	(yellow card) 42'	(substituted off) 63'
Substitutions:
DF	2	Egzon Bejtulai		(substituted on) 63'
MF	15	Tihomir Kostadinov		(substituted on) 63'
FW	7	Ivan Trichkovski		(substituted on) 82'
MF	26	Milan Ristovski		(substituted on) 86'
Manager:
Igor Angelovski

Man of the Match:
David Alaba (Austria)

Assistant referees:
Mehmet Culum (Sweden)
Stefan Hallberg (Sweden)
Fourth official:
Sergei Karasev (Russia)
Reserve assistant referee:
Igor Demeshko (Russia)
Video assistant referee:
Bastian Dankert (Germany)
Assistant video assistant referees:
Chris Kavanagh (England)
Benjamin Pagès (France)
Jérôme Brisard (France)

=== Netherlands vs Ukraine ===
13 June 2021
21:00

Netherlands	3–2	Ukraine
Wijnaldum 52'; Weghorst 58'; Dumfries 85'	Report	Yarmolenko 75'; Yaremchuk 79'

Johan Cruyff Arena, Amsterdam
Attendance: 15,837
Referee: Felix Brych (Germany)

Netherlands	Ukraine

GK	1	Maarten Stekelenburg
CB	25	Jurriën Timber	(substituted off) 88'
CB	6	Stefan de Vrij
CB	17	Daley Blind	(substituted off) 64'
RWB	22	Denzel Dumfries
LWB	12	Patrick van Aanholt	(substituted off) 64'
CM	15	Marten de Roon
CM	8	Georginio Wijnaldum (c)
CM	21	Frenkie de Jong
CF	19	Wout Weghorst	(substituted off) 88'
CF	10	Memphis Depay	(substituted off) 90+1'
Substitutions:
DF	4	Nathan Aké	(substituted on) 64'
DF	5	Owen Wijndal	(substituted on) 64'
FW	9	Luuk de Jong	(substituted on) 88'
DF	2	Joël Veltman	(substituted on) 88'
FW	18	Donyell Malen	(substituted on) 90+1'
Manager:
Frank de Boer

GK	1	Heorhiy Bushchan
RB	21	Oleksandr Karavayev
CB	13	Illya Zabarnyi
CB	22	Mykola Matviyenko
LB	16	Vitalii Mykolenko
DM	17	Oleksandr Zinchenko
CM	5	Serhiy Sydorchuk	(yellow card) 90+3'
CM	8	Ruslan Malinovskyi
RW	7	Andriy Yarmolenko (c)
LW	20	Oleksandr Zubkov		(substituted off) 13'
CF	9	Roman Yaremchuk
Substitutions:
MF	11	Marlos		(substituted on) 13'	(substituted off) 64'
MF	10	Mykola Shaparenko			(substituted on) 64'
Manager:
Andriy Shevchenko

Man of the Match:
Denzel Dumfries (Netherlands)

Assistant referees:
Mark Borsch (Germany)
Stefan Lupp (Germany)
Fourth official:
Bartosz Frankowski (Poland)
Reserve assistant referee:
Marcin Boniek (Poland)
Video assistant referee:
Marco Fritz (Germany)
Assistant video assistant referees:
Christian Dingert (Germany)
Lee Betts (England)
Stuart Attwell (England)

=== Ukraine vs North Macedonia ===
17 June 2021
15:00 (16:00 UTC+3)

Ukraine	2–1	North Macedonia
Yarmolenko 29'; Yaremchuk 34'	Report	Alioski 57'

Arena Națională, Bucharest
Attendance: 10,001
Referee: Fernando Rapallini (Argentina)

Ukraine	North Macedonia

GK	1	Heorhiy Bushchan
RB	21	Oleksandr Karavayev
CB	13	Illya Zabarnyi
CB	22	Mykola Matviyenko
LB	16	Vitalii Mykolenko
DM	6	Taras Stepanenko
CM	10	Mykola Shaparenko	(yellow card) 43'	(substituted off) 78'
CM	17	Oleksandr Zinchenko
RW	7	Andriy Yarmolenko (c)		(substituted off) 70'
LW	8	Ruslan Malinovskyi		(substituted off) 90+2'
CF	9	Roman Yaremchuk		(substituted off) 70'
Substitutions:
MF	15	Viktor Tsyhankov		(substituted on) 70'
FW	19	Artem Besyedin		(substituted on) 70'
MF	5	Serhiy Sydorchuk		(substituted on) 78'
DF	2	Eduard Sobol		(substituted on) 90+2'
Manager:
Andriy Shevchenko

GK	1	Stole Dimitrievski
CB	13	Stefan Ristovski
CB	14	Darko Velkovski	(yellow card) 59'	(substituted off) 85'
CB	6	Visar Musliu
RWB	16	Boban Nikolov		(substituted off) 46'
LWB	8	Ezgjan Alioski
CM	5	Arijan Ademi		(substituted off) 85'
CM	20	Stefan Spirovski		(substituted off) 46'
AM	17	Enis Bardhi		(substituted off) 77'
CF	10	Goran Pandev (c)
CF	21	Eljif Elmas
Substitutions:
MF	25	Darko Churlinov		(substituted on) 46'
FW	9	Aleksandar Trajkovski		(substituted on) 46'
FW	24	Daniel Avramovski	(yellow card) 83'	(substituted on) 77'
DF	4	Kire Ristevski		(substituted on) 85'
FW	7	Ivan Trichkovski		(substituted on) 85'
Manager:
Igor Angelovski

Man of the Match:
Andriy Yarmolenko (Ukraine)

Assistant referees:
Juan Pablo Belatti (Argentina)
Diego Bonfá (Argentina)
Fourth official:
Slavko Vinčić (Slovenia)
Reserve assistant referee:
Tomaž Klančnik (Slovenia)
Video assistant referee:
Alejandro Hernández Hernández (Spain)
Assistant video assistant referees:
José María Sánchez Martínez (Spain)
Filippo Meli (Italy)
Juan Martínez Munuera (Spain)

=== Netherlands vs Austria ===
17 June 2021
21:00

Netherlands	2–0	Austria
Depay 11' (pen.); Dumfries 67'	Report

Johan Cruyff Arena, Amsterdam
Attendance: 15,243
Referee: Orel Grinfeld (Israel)

Netherlands	Austria

GK	1	Maarten Stekelenburg
CB	6	Stefan de Vrij
CB	3	Matthijs de Ligt
CB	17	Daley Blind		(substituted off) 64'
RWB	22	Denzel Dumfries
LWB	12	Patrick van Aanholt		(substituted off) 64'
CM	15	Marten de Roon	(yellow card) 14'	(substituted off) 74'
CM	8	Georginio Wijnaldum (c)
CM	21	Frenkie de Jong
CF	19	Wout Weghorst		(substituted off) 64'
CF	10	Memphis Depay		(substituted off) 82'
Substitutions:
DF	4	Nathan Aké		(substituted on) 64'
FW	18	Donyell Malen		(substituted on) 64'
DF	5	Owen Wijndal		(substituted on) 64'
MF	16	Ryan Gravenberch		(substituted on) 74'
FW	9	Luuk de Jong		(substituted on) 82'
Manager:
Frank de Boer

GK	13	Daniel Bachmann	(yellow card) 67'
RB	21	Stefan Lainer
CB	3	Aleksandar Dragović		(substituted off) 84'
CB	4	Martin Hinteregger
LB	2	Andreas Ulmer
RM	19	Christoph Baumgartner		(substituted off) 70'
CM	23	Xaver Schlager		(substituted off) 84'
CM	24	Konrad Laimer		(substituted off) 61'
LM	8	David Alaba (c)	(yellow card) 10'
CF	11	Michael Gregoritsch		(substituted off) 61'
CF	9	Marcel Sabitzer
Substitutions:
MF	10	Florian Grillitsch		(substituted on) 61'
FW	25	Saša Kalajdžić		(substituted on) 61'
MF	22	Valentino Lazaro		(substituted on) 70'
DF	15	Philipp Lienhart		(substituted on) 84'
MF	20	Karim Onisiwo		(substituted on) 84'
Manager:
(Germany) Franco Foda

Man of the Match:
Denzel Dumfries (Netherlands)

Assistant referees:
Roy Hassan (Israel)
Idan Yarkoni (Israel)
Fourth official:
Davide Massa (Italy)
Reserve assistant referee:
Stefano Alassio (Italy)
Video assistant referee:
Paweł Gil (Poland)
Assistant video assistant referees:
Paolo Valeri (Italy)
Lee Betts (England)
Stuart Attwell (England)

=== North Macedonia vs Netherlands ===
21 June 2021
18:00

North Macedonia	0–3	Netherlands
	Report	Depay 24'; Wijnaldum 50', 58'

Johan Cruyff Arena, Amsterdam
Attendance: 15,227
Referee: István Kovács (Romania)

North Macedonia	Netherlands

GK	1	Stole Dimitrievski
RB	13	Stefan Ristovski	(yellow card) 18'
CB	14	Darko Velkovski
CB	6	Visar Musliu	(yellow card) 48'
LB	8	Ezgjan Alioski	(yellow card) 65'
CM	17	Enis Bardhi		(substituted off) 78'
CM	5	Arijan Ademi		(substituted off) 78'
RW	7	Ivan Trichkovski		(substituted off) 56'
AM	21	Eljif Elmas
LW	9	Aleksandar Trajkovski		(substituted off) 68'
CF	10	Goran Pandev (c)		(substituted off) 68'
Substitutions:
MF	25	Darko Churlinov		(substituted on) 56'
MF	11	Ferhan Hasani		(substituted on) 68'
MF	15	Tihomir Kostadinov	(yellow card) 84'	(substituted on) 68'
FW	18	Vlatko Stojanovski		(substituted on) 78'
MF	16	Boban Nikolov		(substituted on) 78'
Manager:
Igor Angelovski

GK	1	Maarten Stekelenburg
CB	6	Stefan de Vrij	(substituted off) 46'
CB	3	Matthijs de Ligt
CB	17	Daley Blind
RWB	22	Denzel Dumfries	(substituted off) 46'
LWB	12	Patrick van Aanholt
CM	21	Frenkie de Jong	(substituted off) 78'
CM	8	Georginio Wijnaldum (c)
CM	16	Ryan Gravenberch
CF	10	Memphis Depay	(substituted off) 66'
CF	18	Donyell Malen	(substituted off) 66'
Substitutions:
FW	7	Steven Berghuis	(substituted on) 46'
MF	25	Jurriën Timber	(substituted on) 46'
FW	19	Wout Weghorst	(substituted on) 66'
MF	11	Quincy Promes	(substituted on) 66'
FW	26	Cody Gakpo	(substituted on) 78'
Manager:
Frank de Boer

Man of the Match:
Georginio Wijnaldum (Netherlands)

Assistant referees:
Vasile Marinescu (Romania)
Ovidiu Artene (Romania)
Fourth official:
Georgi Kabakov (Bulgaria)
Reserve assistant referee:
Martin Margaritov (Bulgaria)
Video assistant referee:
Marco Di Bello (Italy)
Assistant video assistant referees:
Paolo Valeri (Italy)
Lee Betts (England)
Paweł Gil (Poland)

=== Ukraine vs Austria ===
21 June 2021
18:00 (19:00 UTC+3)

Ukraine	0–1	Austria
	Report	Baumgartner 21'

Arena Națională, Bucharest
Attendance: 10,472
Referee: Cüneyt Çakır (Turkey)

Ukraine	Austria

GK	1	Heorhiy Bushchan
RB	21	Oleksandr Karavayev
CB	13	Illya Zabarnyi
CB	22	Mykola Matviyenko
LB	16	Vitalii Mykolenko	(substituted off) 85'
DM	5	Serhiy Sydorchuk
CM	10	Mykola Shaparenko	(substituted off) 68'
CM	17	Oleksandr Zinchenko
RW	7	Andriy Yarmolenko (c)
LW	8	Ruslan Malinovskyi	(substituted off) 46'
CF	9	Roman Yaremchuk
Substitutions:
MF	15	Viktor Tsyhankov	(substituted on) 46'
MF	11	Marlos	(substituted on) 68'
FW	19	Artem Besyedin	(substituted on) 85'
Manager:
Andriy Shevchenko

GK	13	Daniel Bachmann
RB	21	Stefan Lainer
CB	3	Aleksandar Dragović
CB	4	Martin Hinteregger
LB	8	David Alaba (c)
CM	23	Xaver Schlager
CM	24	Konrad Laimer	(substituted off) 72'
CM	10	Florian Grillitsch
AM	19	Christoph Baumgartner	(substituted off) 32'
AM	9	Marcel Sabitzer
CF	7	Marko Arnautović	(substituted off) 90'
Substitutions:
MF	18	Alessandro Schöpf	(substituted on) 32'
MF	6	Stefan Ilsanker	(substituted on) 72'
FW	25	Saša Kalajdžić	(substituted on) 90'
Manager:
(Germany) Franco Foda

Man of the Match:
Florian Grillitsch (Austria)

Assistant referees:
Bahattin Duran (Turkey)
Tarık Ongun (Turkey)
Fourth official:
Daniel Siebert (Germany)
Reserve assistant referee:
Jan Seidel (Germany)
Video assistant referee:
Massimiliano Irrati (Italy)
Assistant video assistant referees:
José María Sánchez Martínez (Spain)
Íñigo Prieto López de Cerain (Spain)
Juan Martínez Munuera (Spain)

== Discipline ==
Fair play points were to be used as a tiebreaker if the head-to-head and overall records of teams were tied (and if a penalty shoot-out was not applicable as a tiebreaker). These were calculated based on yellow and red cards received in all group matches as follows:

- yellow card = 1 point
- red card as a result of two yellow cards = 3 points
- direct red card = 3 points
- yellow card followed by direct red card = 4 points

Only one of the above deductions was applied to a player in a single match.

Team	Match 1				Match 2				Match 3				Points
Team	Booked	(yellow card) (yellow-red card)	Sent off (straight red)	(yellow card) (red card)	Booked	(yellow card) (yellow-red card)	Sent off (straight red)	(yellow card) (red card)	Booked	(yellow card) (yellow-red card)	Sent off (straight red)	(yellow card) (red card)	Points
Netherlands					1								−1
Ukraine	1				1								−2
Austria	1				2								−3
North Macedonia	2				2				4				−8

== See also ==
- Austria at the UEFA European Championship
- Netherlands at the UEFA European Championship
- North Macedonia at the UEFA European Championship
- Ukraine at the UEFA European Championship
