= UEFA Euro 2020 qualifying play-offs =

European football tournament

The play-offs of the UEFA Euro 2020 qualifying tournament decided the last four teams that qualified for the UEFA Euro 2020 final tournament, to be staged across Europe in June and July 2020 before being delayed until 2021. Unlike previous editions, the participants of the play-offs were not decided based on results from the qualifying group stage. Instead, 16 teams that failed to qualify through their group were selected based on their performance in the 2018–19 UEFA Nations League. The sixteen teams were then divided into four paths, each containing four teams, with each play-off path featuring two single-leg semi-finals and one single-leg final. The four play-off path winners joined the twenty teams that had already qualified for UEFA Euro 2020. The matches were originally scheduled for March 2020, but were postponed to 8 October and 12 November 2020 by UEFA due to the COVID-19 pandemic in Europe.

Hungary, Slovakia, Scotland and North Macedonia qualified for the final tournament.

== Format ==
With the new play-off format, the qualifying process guaranteed that at least one team from each division of the previous Nations League season would qualify for the final tournament.

The 16 teams were selected based on their performance in the 2018–19 UEFA Nations League. These teams were divided into four paths, each containing four teams, with one team from each path qualifying for the final tournament. Each league would have its own play-off path if at least four teams were available. The Nations League group winners then qualified automatically for the play-off path of their league. If a group winner had already qualified through the conventional qualifying group stage, they were then replaced by the next best-ranked team in the same league. However, if there were not enough teams in the same league, then the spot went to the next-best team in the overall ranking. However, group winners could not face teams from a higher league.

With the final tournament draw being held on 30 November 2019 before the play-offs, it was possible that some groups could not be finalized based on the hosts in the play-offs. In that case, a second draw would have taken place after the play-offs on 1 April 2020. However, UEFA confirmed the additional draw was not necessary after the identity of the 20 directly qualified teams and the 16 play-offs teams was known.

=== Team selection ===
Based on the Nations League rankings, the 16 selected teams were chosen as follows, starting with League D and working up to League A:

1. All available group winners were selected.
2. If a group winner had already qualified through the UEFA Euro 2020 qualifying group stage, they were replaced by the next best-ranked team from the same league that had not also already qualified.
3. If fewer than four teams from a given league had failed to qualify, then the remaining spaces for that league were allocated by the overall ranking:
  - If the league had a group winner selected for the play-offs, then the next best team in the overall ranking from a lower league was selected.
  - If the league had no group winner available, then the best team in the overall ranking was selected.

=== Path formation ===
The 16 selected teams were then allocated to paths of 4 teams. The draw to allocate teams to the different paths was subject to the following general conditions:

1. Group winners could not form a path with a team from a higher league.
2. If four or more teams from a league entered the play-offs, a path with four teams from the league in question had to be formed.
3. Additional conditions may have been applied, subject to approval, including seeding principles and the possibility of final tournament hosts being drawn into different paths.

With these conditions, the draw procedure was as follows, starting with League D and working up to League A:

1. Form a path with four teams from the same league.
2. If there were more than four teams qualified in a given league, draw which teams would participate in the play-off path of that league.
3. Remaining teams were drawn into a path of a higher league.

This procedure meant that if there were no teams from League A (i.e. they all qualified directly for the final tournament), then four teams from lower leagues would be allocated to the path of League A.

=== Match pairings and rules ===
Each play-off path featured two single-leg semi-finals and one single-leg final. In the semi-finals of each path, based on the Nations League rankings, the best-ranked team hosted the lowest-ranked team, and the second-ranked team hosted the third-ranked team. The host of the final was decided during the 22 November 2019 draw, chosen between the winners of the semi-final pairings.

The play-offs were played in single-leg knockout matches. If scores were level at the end of normal time, 30 minutes of extra time were played. If the scores remained tied, a penalty shoot-out was used to determine the winner.

The UEFA Executive Committee approved the use of the video assistant referee system for the qualifying play-offs during their meeting in Nyon, Switzerland on 4 December 2019.

=== Effects of the COVID-19 pandemic ===
Due to the COVID-19 pandemic in Europe, the UEFA Executive Committee approved on 24 September 2020 the following principles for the UEFA Euro 2020 qualifying play-offs:

- Each team could use a maximum of five substitutions, with a sixth allowed in extra time. However, each team was only given three opportunities to make substitutions, with a fourth opportunity in extra time, excluding substitutions made at half-time, before the start of extra time, and at half-time in extra time.
- If a group of players of a team were placed into mandatory quarantine or self-isolation following a decision from national or local health officials due to positive SARS-CoV-2 tests, the match would go ahead as scheduled as long as the team had at least 13 players available (including at least one goalkeeper).
- If a team could not field the minimum required number of players due to positive SARS-CoV-2 tests, the match would be rescheduled at a later date to be decided by the UEFA administration, including May or June 2021 preceding the start of the UEFA Euro 2020 final tournament. Additionally, UEFA could have the venue reassigned to a neutral UEFA member association if deemed appropriate.
- If any member of the appointed referee team had to be replaced due to a positive SARS-CoV-2 test, UEFA could exceptionally appoint a match official of the same nationality as one of the teams and not on the FIFA list.

On 1 October 2020, UEFA announced the partial return of spectators to matches beginning in October 2020, restricted to a maximum of 30 percent of the respective stadium capacity. However, the return of spectators was subject to the decision of local authorities, with regional limits (including requirements for matches to be played behind closed doors) taking precedence over UEFA's maximum allowed capacity. Away supporters were not allowed at the venues. Social distancing was mandatory for spectators, and additional preventive measures (such as face masks) were implemented per local regulations.

== Teams selected ==
The team selection process determined the 16 teams that competed in the play-offs based on a set of criteria. Teams in bold advanced to the play-offs.

League A
Rank	Team
1 ^{GW}	Portugal
2 ^{GW}	Netherlands
3 ^{GW}	England
4 ^{GW}	Switzerland
5	Belgium
6	France
7	Spain
8	Italy
9	Croatia
10	Poland
11	Germany
12	Iceland

League B
Rank	Team
13 ^{GW}	Bosnia and Herzegovina
14 ^{GW}	Ukraine
15 ^{GW}	Denmark
16 ^{GW}	Sweden
17	Russia
18	Austria
19	Wales
20	Czech Republic
21	Slovakia
22	Turkey
23	Republic of Ireland
24	Northern Ireland

League C
Rank	Team
25 ^{GW}	Scotland
26 ^{GW}	Norway
27 ^{GW}	Serbia
28 ^{GW}	Finland
29	Bulgaria
30	Israel
31	Hungary
32	Romania
33	Greece
34	Albania
35	Montenegro
36	Cyprus
37	Estonia
38	Slovenia
39	Lithuania

League D
Rank	Team
40 ^{GW}	Georgia
41 ^{GW}	North Macedonia
42 ^{GW}	Kosovo
43 ^{GW}	Belarus
44	Luxembourg
45	Armenia
46	Azerbaijan
47	Kazakhstan
48	Moldova
49	Gibraltar
50	Faroe Islands
51	Latvia
52	Liechtenstein
53	Andorra
54	Malta
55	San Marino

Key

1. ^{GW} Nations League group winner
2. ^{H} UEFA Euro 2020 host at the time of the draw
3. Team advanced to play-offs
4. Team qualified directly to final tournament

== Draw ==
The qualifying play-off draw took place on 22 November 2019, 12:00 CET, at the UEFA headquarters in Nyon, Switzerland. The draw followed the path formation rules to determine the play-off paths that the non-group winners would participate in. Four separate draws determining the host of the play-off final of each path also took place between the winners of the semi-final pairings (identified as semi-final 1 for 1 v 4, and semi-final 2 for 2 v 3). Due to the specificity of the draw, the procedure could only be finalised following the conclusion of the qualifying group stage. Depending on the combination of teams entering the play-offs, one or more draws may have been required to complete the formation of the play-off paths. While UEFA set the following general principles for the draw, none were ultimately necessary:

- Competition-related reasons: To give host teams a fair chance to qualify for the final tournament, they may have allocated to different paths when possible.
- Prohibited clashes: Several prohibited clashes were also identified by UEFA, (Note: The restriction would have applied to the following pairings: Armenia / Azerbaijan, Gibraltar / Spain, Kosovo / Bosnia and Herzegovina, Kosovo / Russia, Kosovo / Serbia, Russia / Ukraine.) preventing matches between various pairs of teams for political reasons. If it were not possible to keep the teams in separate paths (e.g. they were both group winners from the same path), the conditions to play the match would have needed to be defined (e.g. playing the match at a neutral venue and/or behind closed doors).
- Possible seeding: Seeding may have been necessary depending on the specific combinations of teams that advanced to the play-offs.

Based on the 16 teams that advanced to the play-offs, the four play-off paths were formed following the path formation rules, starting with League D and working up to League A:

- As there were four group-winning teams from League D, they were all placed in Path D.
- As there were seven teams from League C (three group winners and four non-group winners), the three group winners were placed in Path C, while a draw decided which one of the four non-group winners was also placed in Path C.
- As there were four teams from League B (one group winner and three non-group winners), they were all placed in Path B.
- As there was only one non-group winning team from League A, it was placed in Path A. The three non-group winners from League C that were not drawn to Path C were then placed in Path A.

The following four non-group winners from League C (ordered by Nations League ranking) took part in the draw, with one being drawn into Path C, while the remaining three were allocated to Path A:

1. Bulgaria
2. Israel
3. Hungary
4. Romania

The team drawn into Path C occupied position C4, while the three teams drawn into Path A occupied positions A2, A3 and A4, following their Nations League ranking.

The following was the composition of the play-off paths:

Path A
Rank	Team
1	Iceland
2	Bulgaria
3	Hungary
4	Romania

Path B
Rank	Team
1	Bosnia and Herzegovina
2	Slovakia
3	Republic of Ireland
4	Northern Ireland

Path C
Rank	Team
1	Scotland
2	Norway
3	Serbia
4	Israel

Path D
Rank	Team
1	Georgia
2	North Macedonia
3	Kosovo
4	Belarus

Key

1. ^{H} UEFA Euro 2020 host at the time of the draw

The following semi-final winners were drawn to host the play-off final:

- Path A: Winner semi-final 2 (Bulgaria v Hungary)
- Path B: Winner semi-final 1 (Bosnia and Herzegovina v Northern Ireland)
- Path C: Winner semi-final 2 (Norway v Serbia)
- Path D: Winner semi-final 1 (Georgia v Belarus)

With host Scotland in Path C, and two other hosts Hungary and Romania to be drawn into Path A or C, it was not possible to prevent one of these paths from containing two host teams. Therefore, the winner of the path with two hosts had to be assigned to two final tournament groups.

== Schedule ==
The semi-finals took place on 8 October 2020, while the final matches took place on 12 November 2020. The semi-final and potential final hosts had until 20 December 2019 to confirm their venue.

The initial fixture list was published by UEFA on 22 November 2019 following the draw. Originally, the semi-finals were scheduled to take place on 26 March 2020, while the final matches would take place five days later on 31 March. However, the play-offs were postponed by UEFA on 17 March 2020 due to the COVID-19 pandemic in Europe. Afterwards, UEFA tentatively scheduled for the matches to take place on 4 and 9 June 2020. However, the play-offs were later postponed indefinitely by UEFA on 1 April 2020. The scheduling of the play-offs was reviewed by the UEFA Executive Committee during their meeting on 17 June 2020. At the meeting, UEFA decided to stage the play-offs in October and November 2020. To facilitate this, an additional matchday was added to both international windows, allowing for triple-headers to be played to complete the league phase of the 2020–21 UEFA Nations League as scheduled. The changes to the International Match Calendar for October and November 2020 were approved by the FIFA Council on 25 June 2020.

Times are CET/CEST, (Note: CEST (UTC+2) for the semi-finals (8 October), and CET (UTC+1) for the finals (12 November).) as listed by UEFA (local times, if different, are in parentheses). Kick-off times were generally 20:45, with some exceptions at 18:00 based on the local time zone.

== Path A ==
The winner of Path A, Hungary, entered Group F in the final tournament. If Romania had won Path A, they would have entered Group C instead.

=== Bracket ===
Semi-finals
8 October 2020 – Sofia
Bulgaria	1
Hungary	3
8 October 2020 – Reykjavík
Iceland	2
Romania	1

Final
12 November 2020 – Budapest
Hungary	2
Iceland	1

=== Semi-finals ===
8 October 2020
20:45 (18:45 UTC±0)

Iceland	2–1	Romania
G. Sigurðsson 16', 34'	Report	Maxim 63' (pen.)

Laugardalsvöllur, Reykjavík
Attendance: 60
Referee: Damir Skomina (Slovenia)

8 October 2020
20:45 (21:45 UTC+3)

Bulgaria	1–3	Hungary
Yomov 89'	Report	Orbán 17'; Kalmár 47'; Nikolić 75'

Vasil Levski National Stadium, Sofia
Attendance: 1,929
Referee: Szymon Marciniak (Poland)

=== Final ===
12 November 2020
20:45

Hungary	2–1	Iceland
Négo 88'; Szoboszlai 90+2'	Report	G. Sigurðsson 11'

Puskás Aréna, Budapest
Attendance: 0 (Note: The Hungary v Iceland match was played behind closed doors due to the COVID-19 pandemic in Hungary.)
Referee: Björn Kuipers (Netherlands)

== Path B ==
The winner of Path B, Slovakia, entered Group E in the final tournament.

=== Bracket ===
Semi-finals
8 October 2020 – Sarajevo
Bosnia and Herzegovina	1 (3)
Northern Ireland (p)	1 (4)
8 October 2020 – Bratislava
Slovakia (p)	0 (4)
Republic of Ireland	0 (2)

Final
12 November 2020 – Belfast
Northern Ireland	1
Slovakia (a.e.t.)	2

=== Semi-finals ===
8 October 2020
20:45

Bosnia and Herzegovina	1–1 (a.e.t.)	Northern Ireland
Krunić 14'	Report	McGinn 53'
Penalties
Pjanić (penalty scored); Hajradinović (penalty missed); Višća (penalty missed); Hotić (penalty scored); Džeko (penalty scored)	3–4	(penalty scored) Dallas; (penalty scored) Lafferty; (penalty missed) Saville; (penalty scored) Washington; (penalty scored) Boyce

Stadion Grbavica, Sarajevo (Note: The Bosnia and Herzegovina v Northern Ireland match, originally scheduled to be played at Bilino Polje Stadium, Zenica, was later moved to Stadion Grbavica, Sarajevo.)
Attendance: 1,800
Referee: Antonio Mateu Lahoz (Spain)

8 October 2020
20:45

Slovakia	0–0 (a.e.t.)	Republic of Ireland
	Report
Penalties
Hamšík (penalty scored); Hrošovský (penalty scored); Haraslín (penalty scored); Greguš (penalty scored)	4–2	(penalty scored) Hourihane; (penalty scored) Brady; (penalty missed) Browne; (penalty missed) Doherty

Tehelné pole, Bratislava
Attendance: 0 (Note: The Slovakia v Republic of Ireland match was played behind closed doors due to the COVID-19 pandemic in Slovakia.)
Referee: Clément Turpin (France)

=== Final ===
12 November 2020
20:45 (19:45 UTC±0)

Northern Ireland	1–2 (a.e.t.)	Slovakia
Škriniar 88' (o.g.)	Report	Kucka 17'; Ďuriš 110'

Windsor Park, Belfast
Attendance: 1,060
Referee: Felix Brych (Germany)

== Path C ==
The winner of Path C, Scotland, entered Group D in the final tournament.

=== Bracket ===
Semi-finals
8 October 2020 – Oslo
Norway	1
Serbia (a.e.t.)	2
8 October 2020 – Glasgow
Scotland (p)	0 (5)
Israel	0 (3)

Final
12 November 2020 – Belgrade
Serbia	1 (4)
Scotland (p)	1 (5)

=== Semi-finals ===
8 October 2020
20:45 (19:45 UTC+1)

Scotland	0–0 (a.e.t.)	Israel
	Report
Penalties
McGinn (penalty scored); McGregor (penalty scored); McTominay (penalty scored); Shankland (penalty scored); McLean (penalty scored)	5–3	(penalty missed) Zahavi; (penalty scored) Bitton; (penalty scored) Weissman; (penalty scored) Abu Fani

Hampden Park, Glasgow
Attendance: 0 (Note: The Scotland v Israel match was played behind closed doors due to the COVID-19 pandemic in Scotland.)
Referee: Ovidiu Hațegan (Romania)

8 October 2020
20:45

Norway	1–2 (a.e.t.)	Serbia
Normann 88'	Report	Milinković-Savić 82', 102'

Ullevaal Stadion, Oslo
Attendance: 200
Referee: Daniele Orsato (Italy)

=== Final ===
12 November 2020
20:45

Serbia	1–1 (a.e.t.)	Scotland
Jović 90'	Report	Christie 52'
Penalties
Tadić (penalty scored); Jović (penalty scored); Gudelj (penalty scored); Katai (penalty scored); A. Mitrović (penalty missed)	4–5	(penalty scored) Griffiths; (penalty scored) McGregor; (penalty scored) McTominay; (penalty scored) McBurnie; (penalty scored) McLean

Red Star Stadium, Belgrade
Attendance: 0 (Note: The Serbia v Scotland match was played behind closed doors due to the COVID-19 pandemic in Serbia.)
Referee: Antonio Mateu Lahoz (Spain)

== Path D ==
The winner of Path D, North Macedonia, entered Group C in the final tournament. If Romania had won Path A, the winner of Path D would have entered Group F instead.

=== Bracket ===
Semi-finals
8 October 2020 – Tbilisi
Georgia	1
Belarus	0
8 October 2020 – Skopje
North Macedonia	2
Kosovo	1

Final
12 November 2020 – Tbilisi
Georgia	0
North Macedonia	1

=== Semi-finals ===
8 October 2020
18:00 (20:00 UTC+4)

Georgia	1–0	Belarus
Okriashvili 7' (pen.)	Report

Boris Paichadze Dinamo Arena, Tbilisi
Attendance: 0 (Note: The Georgia v Belarus match was played behind closed doors due to the COVID-19 pandemic in Georgia.)
Referee: Cüneyt Çakır (Turkey)

8 October 2020
20:45

North Macedonia	2–1	Kosovo
Kololli 16' (o.g.); Velkovski 33'	Report	Hadergjonaj 29'

Toše Proeski Arena, Skopje
Attendance: 0 (Note: The North Macedonia v Kosovo match was played behind closed doors due to the COVID-19 pandemic in North Macedonia.)
Referee: Danny Makkelie (Netherlands)

=== Final ===
12 November 2020
18:00 (21:00 UTC+4)

Georgia	0–1	North Macedonia
	Report	Pandev 56'

Boris Paichadze Dinamo Arena, Tbilisi
Attendance: 0 (Note: The Georgia v North Macedonia match was played behind closed doors due to the COVID-19 pandemic in Georgia.)
Referee: Anthony Taylor (England)

== Goalscorers ==
There were 25 goals scored in 12 matches, for an average of 2.08 goals per match.

3 goals

- (Iceland national football team) Gylfi Sigurðsson

2 goals

- (Serbia national football team) Sergej Milinković-Savić

1 goal

- (Bosnia and Herzegovina national football team) Rade Krunić
- (Bulgaria national football team) Georgi Yomov
- (Georgia national football team) Tornike Okriashvili
- (Hungary national football team) Zsolt Kalmár
- (Hungary national football team) Loïc Négo
- (Hungary national football team) Nemanja Nikolić
- (Hungary national football team) Willi Orbán
- (Hungary national football team) Dominik Szoboszlai
- (Kosovo national football team) Florent Hadergjonaj
- (North Macedonia national football team) Goran Pandev
- (North Macedonia national football team) Darko Velkovski
- (Northern Ireland national football team) Niall McGinn
- (Norway national football team) Mathias Normann
- (Romania national football team) Alexandru Maxim
- (Scotland national football team) Ryan Christie
- (Serbia national football team) Luka Jović
- (Slovakia national football team) Michal Ďuriš
- (Slovakia national football team) Juraj Kucka

1 own goal

- (Kosovo national football team) Benjamin Kololli (against North Macedonia)
- (Slovakia national football team) Milan Škriniar (against Northern Ireland)

== Discipline ==
A player would have been automatically suspended for the next match for the following offences:

- Receiving a red card (red card suspensions could be extended for serious offences)

Yellow cards and pending yellow card suspensions expired on completion of the qualifying group stage, and were not carried forward to the play-offs, finals or any other future international matches.

== Goal of the Round ==
Following the semi-finals and finals, UEFA.com shortlisted four goals for users to vote on as "Goal of the Round", which was sponsored by SOCAR.

Round	Goalscorer	Opponent	Score	Minute	Result	Ref.
Semi-finals	(Kosovo) Florent Hadergjonaj	North Macedonia	1–1	29'	1–2	
Finals	(Hungary) Dominik Szoboszlai	Iceland	2–1	90+2'	2–1	
