= Orel Grinfeld =

Israeli football referee

Orel Grinfeld אוראל גרינפלד
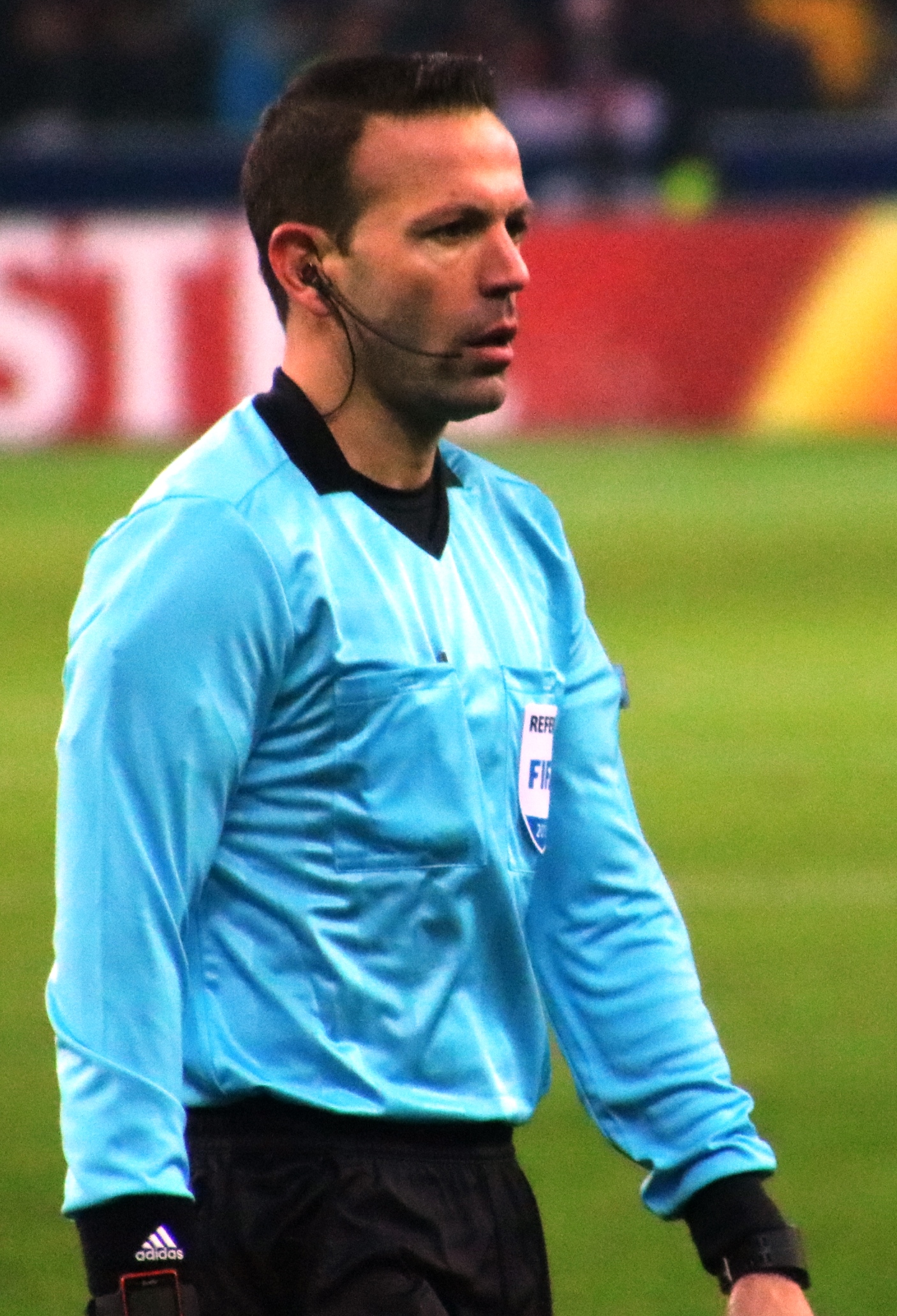
- Full name: Orel Grinfeld
- Born: 21 August 1981 (age 45); Kiryat Yam, Israel

International
| Years | League | Role |
| 2012– | FIFA | Referee |

Orel Grinfeld (Hebrew: אוראל גרינפלד; born 21 August 1981) is an Israeli football referee. He has been on the FIFA list of international referees since 2012, and took charge of his first international matches in March that year, officiating in two Group 1 matches in the 2012 UEFA European Under-17 Championship elite round. He has since gone on to referee senior matches, making his debut in the UEFA Europa League group stage in 2015–16. He made his UEFA Champions League debut in a 2018–19 group stage game between Real Madrid and Viktoria Plzeň. In 2019–20 season, he became the first Israeli referee to officiate a game in the UEFA Champions League knockout stage, in a last 16 game between Lazio and Bayern Munich.

== UEFA Euro 2020 ==
This was Grinfeld's first appearance at a major tournament. Grinfeld refereed the Netherlands–Austria (Group C) match.

== See also ==
- List of football referees
- List of Jews in sports (non-players)
