= UEFA Euro 2020 Group E =

Football tournament group stage

Group E of UEFA Euro 2020 took place from 14 to 23 June 2021 in Saint Petersburg's Krestovsky Stadium and Seville's La Cartuja. The group contained host nation Spain, Sweden, Poland and Slovakia.

The matches were originally scheduled to be played at Bilbao's San Mamés and Dublin's Aviva Stadium. However, due to a lack of guarantees regarding spectators caused by the COVID-19 pandemic, UEFA announced on 23 April 2021 that the matches scheduled in Bilbao were moved to Seville, and the group stage matches scheduled in Dublin were reallocated to Saint Petersburg.

== Teams ==
Draw position	Team	Pot	Method of qualification	Date of qualification	Finals appearance	Last appearance	Previous best performance	Qualifying Rankings November 2019 (Note: The European Qualifiers overall rankings from November 2019 were used for seeding for the final draw.)	FIFA Rankings May 2021
E1	Spain (host)	1	Group F winner	15 October 2019	11th	2016	Winners (1964, 2008, 2012)	5	6
E2	Sweden	3	Group F runner-up	15 November 2019	7th	2016	Semi-finals (1992)	17	18
E3	Poland	2	Group G winner	13 October 2019	4th	2016	Quarter-finals (2016)	8	21
E4	Slovakia (Note: From 1960 to 1980, Slovakia competed as Czechoslovakia.)	4	Play-off Path B winner	12 November 2020	5th	2016	Winners (1976)	22	36

== Standings ==
Pos	Team	Pld	W	D	L	GF	GA	GD	Pts	Qualification
1	Sweden	3	2	1	0	4	2	+2	7	Advance to knockout stage
2	Spain (H)	3	1	2	0	6	1	+5	5	Advance to knockout stage
3	Slovakia	3	1	0	2	2	7	−5	3	
4	Poland	3	0	1	2	4	6	−2	1	

Source: UEFA
Rules for classification: Group stage tiebreakers
(H) Hosts

In the round of 16,

- The winner of Group E, Sweden, advanced to play the third-placed team of Group C, Ukraine.
- The runner-up of Group E, Spain, advanced to play the runner-up of Group D, Croatia.

== Matches ==
=== Poland vs Slovakia ===
14 June 2021
18:00 (19:00 UTC+3)

Poland	1–2	Slovakia
Linetty 46'	Report	Szczęsny 18' (o.g.); Škriniar 69'

Krestovsky Stadium, Saint Petersburg
Attendance: 12,862
Referee: Ovidiu Hațegan (Romania)

Poland	Slovakia

GK	1	Wojciech Szczęsny
RB	18	Bartosz Bereszyński
CB	15	Kamil Glik
CB	5	Jan Bednarek
LB	13	Maciej Rybus		(substituted off) 74'
CM	8	Karol Linetty		(substituted off) 74'
CM	10	Grzegorz Krychowiak	(yellow card) 22' (yellow-red card) 62'
CM	14	Mateusz Klich		(substituted off) 85'
RF	21	Kamil Jóźwiak
CF	9	Robert Lewandowski (c)
LF	20	Piotr Zieliński		(substituted off) 85'
Substitutions:
MF	19	Przemysław Frankowski		(substituted on) 74'
DF	26	Tymoteusz Puchacz		(substituted on) 74'
MF	16	Jakub Moder		(substituted on) 85'
FW	11	Karol Świderski		(substituted on) 85'
Manager:
(Portugal) Paulo Sousa

GK	1	Martin Dúbravka
RB	2	Peter Pekarík		(substituted off) 79'
CB	5	Ľubomír Šatka
CB	14	Milan Škriniar
LB	15	Tomáš Hubočan	(yellow card) 20'
RM	18	Lukáš Haraslín		(substituted off) 87'
CM	19	Juraj Kucka
CM	25	Jakub Hromada		(substituted off) 79'
LM	20	Róbert Mak		(substituted off) 87'
SS	17	Marek Hamšík (c)
CF	8	Ondrej Duda		(substituted off) 90+2'
Substitutions:
MF	13	Patrik Hrošovský		(substituted on) 79'
DF	24	Martin Koscelník		(substituted on) 79'
FW	21	Michal Ďuriš		(substituted on) 87'
MF	10	Tomáš Suslov		(substituted on) 87'
MF	6	Ján Greguš		(substituted on) 90+2'
Manager:
Štefan Tarkovič

Man of the Match:
Milan Škriniar (Slovakia)

Assistant referees:
Radu Ghinguleac (Romania)
Sebastian Gheorghe (Romania)
Fourth official:
István Kovács (Romania)
Reserve assistant referee:
Vasile Marinescu (Romania)
Video assistant referee:
Marco Di Bello (Italy)
Assistant video assistant referees:
Jérôme Brisard (France)
Filippo Meli (Italy)
Massimiliano Irrati (Italy)

=== Spain vs Sweden ===
14 June 2021
21:00

Spain	0–0	Sweden
	Report

Estadio de La Cartuja, Seville
Attendance: 10,559
Referee: Slavko Vinčić (Slovenia)

Spain	Sweden

GK	23	Unai Simón
RB	6	Marcos Llorente
CB	24	Aymeric Laporte
CB	4	Pau Torres
LB	18	Jordi Alba (c)
CM	8	Koke	(substituted off) 87'
CM	16	Rodri	(substituted off) 66'
CM	26	Pedri
RF	11	Ferran Torres	(substituted off) 74'
CF	7	Álvaro Morata	(substituted off) 66'
LF	19	Dani Olmo	(substituted off) 74'
Substitutions:
MF	10	Thiago	(substituted on) 66'
MF	22	Pablo Sarabia	(substituted on) 66'
FW	21	Mikel Oyarzabal	(substituted on) 74'
FW	9	Gerard Moreno	(substituted on) 74'
MF	17	Fabián Ruiz	(substituted on) 87'
Manager:
Luis Enrique

GK	1	Robin Olsen
RB	2	Mikael Lustig	(yellow card) 55'	(substituted off) 75'
CB	3	Victor Lindelöf
CB	24	Marcus Danielson
LB	6	Ludwig Augustinsson
RM	7	Sebastian Larsson (c)
CM	20	Kristoffer Olsson		(substituted off) 84'
CM	8	Albin Ekdal
LM	10	Emil Forsberg		(substituted off) 84'
CF	9	Marcus Berg		(substituted off) 69'
CF	11	Alexander Isak		(substituted off) 69'
Substitutions:
MF	22	Robin Quaison		(substituted on) 69'
MF	17	Viktor Claesson		(substituted on) 69'
DF	16	Emil Krafth		(substituted on) 75'
MF	26	Jens Cajuste		(substituted on) 84'
DF	5	Pierre Bengtsson		(substituted on) 84'
Manager:
Janne Andersson

Man of the Match:
Victor Lindelöf (Sweden)

Assistant referees:
Tomaž Klančnik (Slovenia)
Andraž Kovačič (Slovenia)
Fourth official:
Davide Massa (Italy)
Reserve assistant referee:
Stefano Alassio (Italy)
Video assistant referee:
Bastian Dankert (Germany)
Assistant video assistant referees:
Chris Kavanagh (England)
Lee Betts (England)
Kevin Blom (Netherlands)

=== Sweden vs Slovakia ===
18 June 2021
15:00 (16:00 UTC+3)

Sweden	1–0	Slovakia
Forsberg 77' (pen.)	Report

Krestovsky Stadium, Saint Petersburg
Attendance: 11,525
Referee: Daniel Siebert (Germany)

Sweden	Slovakia

GK	1	Robin Olsen
RB	2	Mikael Lustig
CB	3	Victor Lindelöf
CB	24	Marcus Danielson
LB	6	Ludwig Augustinsson		(substituted off) 88'
RM	7	Sebastian Larsson (c)
CM	20	Kristoffer Olsson	(yellow card) 23'	(substituted off) 64'
CM	8	Albin Ekdal		(substituted off) 88'
LM	10	Emil Forsberg		(substituted off) 90+3'
CF	9	Marcus Berg		(substituted off) 64'
CF	11	Alexander Isak
Substitutions:
MF	17	Viktor Claesson		(substituted on) 64'
MF	22	Robin Quaison		(substituted on) 64'
MF	13	Gustav Svensson		(substituted on) 88'
DF	5	Pierre Bengtsson		(substituted on) 88'
DF	16	Emil Krafth		(substituted on) 90+3'
Manager:
Janne Andersson

GK	1	Martin Dúbravka	(yellow card) 76'
RB	2	Peter Pekarík		(substituted off) 64'
CB	5	Ľubomír Šatka
CB	14	Milan Škriniar
LB	15	Tomáš Hubočan		(substituted off) 84'
CM	19	Juraj Kucka
CM	13	Patrik Hrošovský		(substituted off) 84'
RW	24	Martin Koscelník
AM	17	Marek Hamšík (c)		(substituted off) 77'
LW	20	Róbert Mak		(substituted off) 77'
CF	8	Ondrej Duda	(yellow card) 80'
Substitutions:
MF	18	Lukáš Haraslín		(substituted on) 64'
MF	7	Vladimír Weiss	(yellow card) 87'	(substituted on) 77'
MF	11	László Bénes		(substituted on) 77'
FW	21	Michal Ďuriš		(substituted on) 84'
DF	16	Dávid Hancko		(substituted on) 84'
Manager:
Štefan Tarkovič

Man of the Match:
Alexander Isak (Sweden)

Assistant referees:
Jan Seidel (Germany)
Rafael Foltyn (Germany)
Fourth official:
Georgi Kabakov (Bulgaria)
Reserve assistant referee:
Martin Margaritov (Bulgaria)
Video assistant referee:
Marco Fritz (Germany)
Assistant video assistant referees:
Christian Dingert (Germany)
Lee Betts (England)
Stuart Attwell (England)

=== Spain vs Poland ===
19 June 2021
21:00

Spain	1–1	Poland
Morata 25'	Report	Lewandowski 54'

Estadio de La Cartuja, Seville
Attendance: 11,742
Referee: Daniele Orsato (Italy)

Spain	Poland

GK	23	Unai Simón
RB	6	Marcos Llorente
CB	24	Aymeric Laporte
CB	4	Pau Torres	(yellow card) 81'
LB	18	Jordi Alba (c)
CM	8	Koke		(substituted off) 68'
CM	16	Rodri	(yellow card) 90+5'
CM	26	Pedri
RF	9	Gerard Moreno		(substituted off) 68'
CF	7	Álvaro Morata		(substituted off) 87'
LF	19	Dani Olmo		(substituted off) 61'
Substitutions:
MF	11	Ferran Torres		(substituted on) 61'
MF	17	Fabián Ruiz		(substituted on) 68'
MF	22	Pablo Sarabia		(substituted on) 68'
FW	21	Mikel Oyarzabal		(substituted on) 87'
Manager:
Luis Enrique

GK	1	Wojciech Szczęsny
CB	18	Bartosz Bereszyński
CB	15	Kamil Glik
CB	5	Jan Bednarek		(substituted off) 85'
RM	21	Kamil Jóźwiak	(yellow card) 59'
CM	16	Jakub Moder	(yellow card) 57'	(substituted off) 85'
CM	14	Mateusz Klich	(yellow card) 36'	(substituted off) 55'
LM	26	Tymoteusz Puchacz
AM	11	Karol Świderski		(substituted off) 68'
AM	20	Piotr Zieliński
CF	9	Robert Lewandowski (c)	(yellow card) 90+3'
Substitutions:
MF	6	Kacper Kozłowski		(substituted on) 55'
MF	19	Przemysław Frankowski		(substituted on) 68'
DF	3	Paweł Dawidowicz		(substituted on) 85'
MF	8	Karol Linetty		(substituted on) 85'
Manager:
(Portugal) Paulo Sousa

Man of the Match:
Jordi Alba (Spain)

Assistant referees:
Alessandro Giallatini (Italy)
Fabiano Preti (Italy)
Fourth official:
Stéphanie Frappart (France)
Reserve assistant referee:
Mikaël Berchebru (France)
Video assistant referee:
Massimiliano Irrati (Italy)
Assistant video assistant referees:
Marco Di Bello (Italy)
Filippo Meli (Italy)
Paolo Valeri (Italy)

=== Slovakia vs Spain ===
23 June 2021
18:00

Slovakia	0–5	Spain
	Report	Dúbravka 30' (o.g.); Laporte 45+3'; Sarabia 56'; F. Torres 67'; Kucka 71' (o.g.)

Estadio de La Cartuja, Seville
Attendance: 11,204
Referee: Björn Kuipers (Netherlands)

Slovakia	Spain

GK	1	Martin Dúbravka
RB	2	Peter Pekarík
CB	5	Ľubomír Šatka
CB	14	Milan Škriniar	(yellow card) 90+4'
LB	15	Tomáš Hubočan
RM	18	Lukáš Haraslín		(substituted off) 69'
CM	19	Juraj Kucka
CM	25	Jakub Hromada		(substituted off) 46'
LM	20	Róbert Mak		(substituted off) 69'
AM	17	Marek Hamšík (c)		(substituted off) 90'
CF	8	Ondrej Duda	(yellow card) 12'	(substituted off) 46'
Substitutions:
FW	21	Michal Ďuriš		(substituted on) 46'
MF	22	Stanislav Lobotka		(substituted on) 46'
MF	7	Vladimír Weiss		(substituted on) 69'
MF	10	Tomáš Suslov		(substituted on) 69'
MF	11	László Bénes		(substituted on) 90'
Manager:
Štefan Tarkovič

GK	23	Unai Simón
RB	2	César Azpilicueta		(substituted off) 77'
CB	12	Eric García		(substituted off) 71'
CB	24	Aymeric Laporte
LB	18	Jordi Alba	(yellow card) 60'
CM	8	Koke
CM	5	Sergio Busquets (c)	(yellow card) 40'	(substituted off) 71'
CM	26	Pedri
RF	22	Pablo Sarabia
CF	7	Álvaro Morata		(substituted off) 66'
LF	9	Gerard Moreno		(substituted off) 77'
Substitutions:
MF	11	Ferran Torres		(substituted on) 66'
MF	10	Thiago		(substituted on) 71'
DF	4	Pau Torres		(substituted on) 71'
MF	20	Adama Traoré		(substituted on) 77'
FW	21	Mikel Oyarzabal		(substituted on) 77'
Manager:
Luis Enrique

Man of the Match:
Sergio Busquets (Spain)

Assistant referees:
Sander van Roekel (Netherlands)
Erwin Zeinstra (Netherlands)
Fourth official:
Stéphanie Frappart (France)
Reserve assistant referee:
Mikaël Berchebru (France)
Video assistant referee:
Pol van Boekel (Netherlands)
Assistant video assistant referees:
Kevin Blom (Netherlands)
Christian Gittelmann (Germany)
Bastian Dankert (Germany)

=== Sweden vs Poland ===
23 June 2021
18:00 (19:00 UTC+3)

Sweden	3–2	Poland
Forsberg 2', 59'; Claesson 90+4'	Report	Lewandowski 61', 84'

Krestovsky Stadium, Saint Petersburg
Attendance: 14,252
Referee: Michael Oliver (England)

Sweden	Poland

GK	1	Robin Olsen
RB	2	Mikael Lustig		(substituted off) 68'
CB	3	Victor Lindelöf
CB	24	Marcus Danielson	(yellow card) 10'
LB	6	Ludwig Augustinsson
RM	7	Sebastian Larsson (c)
CM	8	Albin Ekdal
CM	20	Kristoffer Olsson
LM	10	Emil Forsberg		(substituted off) 78'
CF	22	Robin Quaison		(substituted off) 55'
CF	11	Alexander Isak		(substituted off) 68'
Substitutions:
MF	21	Dejan Kulusevski		(substituted on) 55'
FW	9	Marcus Berg		(substituted on) 68'
DF	16	Emil Krafth		(substituted on) 68'
MF	17	Viktor Claesson		(substituted on) 78'
Manager:
Janne Andersson

GK	1	Wojciech Szczęsny
CB	18	Bartosz Bereszyński
CB	15	Kamil Glik	(yellow card) 83'
CB	5	Jan Bednarek
RM	21	Kamil Jóźwiak		(substituted off) 61'
CM	10	Grzegorz Krychowiak	(yellow card) 74'	(substituted off) 78'
CM	14	Mateusz Klich		(substituted off) 73'
LM	26	Tymoteusz Puchacz		(substituted off) 46'
AM	11	Karol Świderski
AM	20	Piotr Zieliński
CF	9	Robert Lewandowski (c)
Substitutions:
MF	19	Przemysław Frankowski		(substituted on) 46'
FW	24	Jakub Świerczok		(substituted on) 61'
MF	6	Kacper Kozłowski		(substituted on) 73'
MF	17	Przemysław Płacheta		(substituted on) 78'
Other disciplinary actions:
TS	—	Jakub Kwiatkowski	(yellow card) 83'
Manager:
(Portugal) Paulo Sousa

Man of the Match:
Emil Forsberg (Sweden)

Assistant referees:
Stuart Burt (England)
Simon Bennett (England)
Fourth official:
Anthony Taylor (England)
Reserve assistant referee:
Gary Beswick (England)
Video assistant referee:
Chris Kavanagh (England)
Assistant video assistant referees:
Christian Dingert (Germany)
Lee Betts (England)
Stuart Attwell (England)

== Discipline ==
Fair play points were to be used as a tiebreaker if the head-to-head and overall records of teams were tied (and if a penalty shoot-out was not applicable as a tiebreaker). These were calculated based on yellow and red cards received in all group matches as follows:

- yellow card = 1 point
- red card as a result of two yellow cards = 3 points
- direct red card = 3 points
- yellow card followed by direct red card = 4 points

Only one of the above deductions was applied to a player in a single match.

Team	Match 1				Match 2				Match 3				Points
Team	Booked	(yellow card) (yellow-red card)	Sent off (straight red)	(yellow card) (red card)	Booked	(yellow card) (yellow-red card)	Sent off (straight red)	(yellow card) (red card)	Booked	(yellow card) (yellow-red card)	Sent off (straight red)	(yellow card) (red card)	Points
Sweden	1				1				1				−3
Spain					2				2				−4
Slovakia	1				3				2				−6
Poland		1			4				3 (Note: Count includes a card from a technical staff member of the team)				−10

== See also ==
- Poland at the UEFA European Championship
- Slovakia at the UEFA European Championship
- Spain at the UEFA European Championship
- Sweden at the UEFA European Championship
