= Stefan Lainer =

Austrian footballer (born 1992)

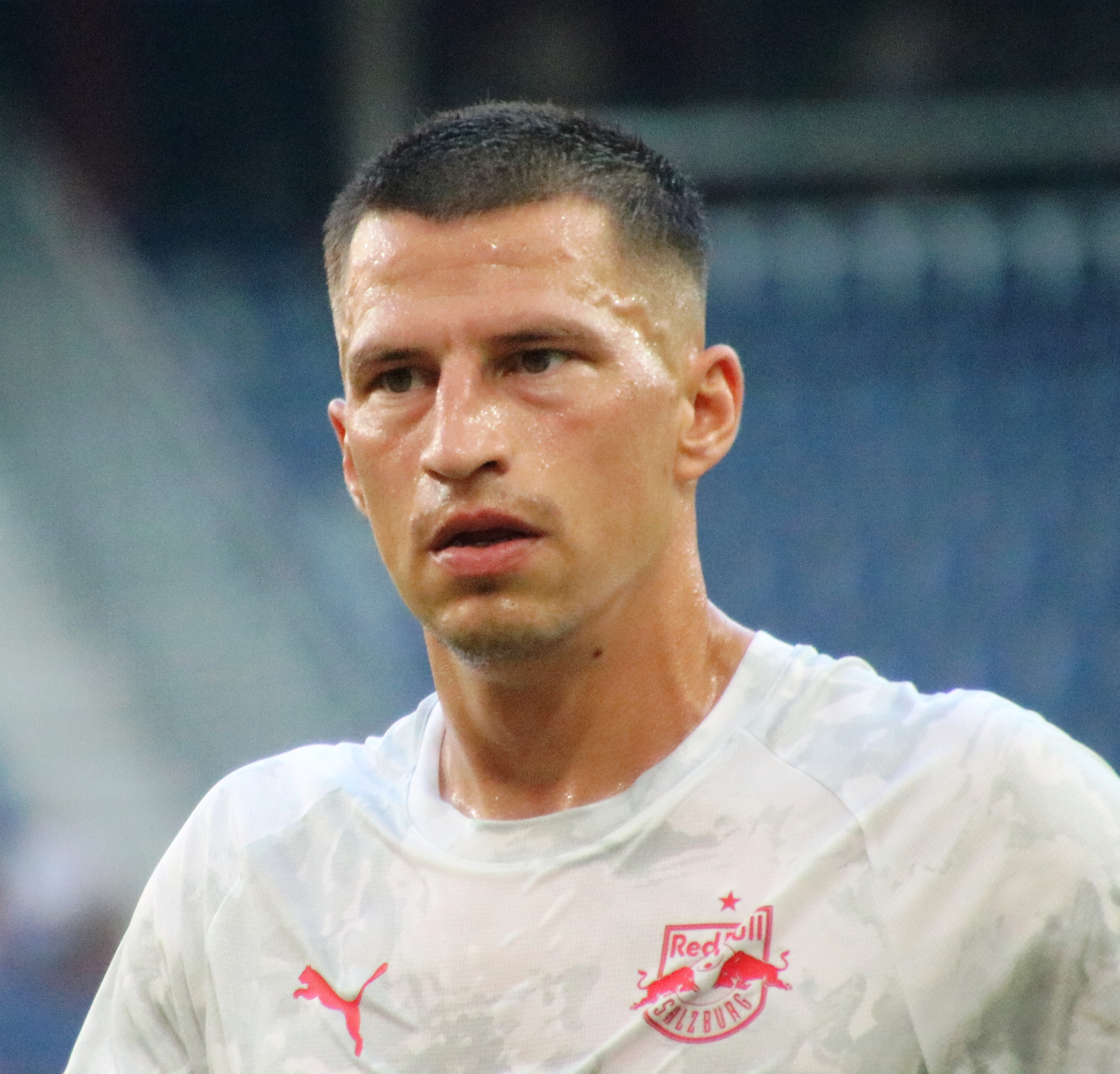
- Lainer with Red Bull Salzburg in 2025

Personal information
- Date of birth: 27 August 1992 (age 34)
- Place of birth: Salzburg, Austria
- Height: 1.75 m (5 ft 9 in)
- Position: Right-back

Team information
- Current team: Red Bull Salzburg
- Number: 22

Youth career
- Seekirchen
- 2009–2013: Red Bull Salzburg
- 2011–2012: → SV Grödig (loan)

Senior career*
Years	Team	Apps	(Gls)
2013–2014	FC Liefering	62	(3)
2014–2015	SV Ried	34	(1)
2015–2019	Red Bull Salzburg	110	(9)
2019–2025	Borussia Mönchengladbach	138	(5)
2025–	Red Bull Salzburg	26	(1)

International career^{‡}
2017–	Austria	39	(2)
- * Club domestic league appearances and goals as of 19:00, 10 October 2026 (UTC) ‡ National team caps and goals as of 23:13, 23 March 2024 (UTC)

Stefan Lainer (born 27 August 1992) is an Austrian professional footballer who plays as right-back for Austrian Bundesliga club Red Bull Salzburg and the Austria national team.

== Club career ==
=== Early career ===
Lainer started his career with the local club SV Seekirchen. In 2006, he came to Red Bull Salzburg. In 2010, he played his first match for the second team of Red Bull. His next step was SV Grödig, where he played on loan. In 2012, he returned to Salzburg where he was in the squad of FC Liefering, the second team of FC Red Bull Salzburg.

Lainer is the son of Leo Lainer, who played for SV Austria Salzburg and the Austria national football team.

=== Red Bull Salzburg ===
On 1 July 2015, Lainer transferred to FC Red Bull Salzburg on a three-year contract for £140,000.

During the 2017–18 season Salzburg had their best ever European campaign. They finished top of their Europa League group for a record fourth time, before beating Real Sociedad, Borussia Dortmund and Lazio, thus making their first ever appearance in the UEFA Europa League semi-final. On 3 May 2018, he played in the Europa League semi-finals as Marseille played out a 1–2 away loss but a 3–2 aggregate win to secure a place in the 2018 UEFA Europa League Final.

=== Return to Red Bull Salzburg ===
On 8 June 2025, Lainer returned from Germany to Red Bull Salzburg on a two-year deal.

== Career statistics ==
=== Club ===
As of match played 28 October 2026

Appearances and goals by club, season and competition
Club	Season	League			National cup (Note: Includes Austrian Cup, DFB-Pokal)		Europe		Other		Total	
Club	Season	Division	Apps	Goals	Apps	Goals	Apps	Goals	Apps	Goals	Apps	Goals
SV Grödig	2011–12	Austrian 2. Liga	23	3	3	0	—		—		26	3
FC Liefering	2012–13	Austrian Regionalliga West	28	2	—		—		2	0	30	2
FC Liefering	2013–14	Austrian 2. Liga	34	1	—		—		—		34	1
FC Liefering	Total		62	3	—		—		2	0	64	3
Ried	2014–15	Austrian Bundesliga	34	1	2	0	—		—		36	1
Red Bull Salzburg	2015–16	Austrian Bundesliga	21	1	4	1	3 (Note: Two appearances in UEFA Champions League, one appearance in UEFA Europa League)	0	—		28	2
Red Bull Salzburg	2016–17	Austrian Bundesliga	31	6	5	2	9 (Note: Four appearances in UEFA Champions League, five appearance in UEFA Europa League)	0	—		45	8
Red Bull Salzburg	2017–18	Austrian Bundesliga	33	1	4	0	18 (Note: Sixteen appearances and one goal in UEFA Europa League, two appearances in UEFA Champions League)	1	—		55	2
Red Bull Salzburg	2018–19	Austrian Bundesliga	25	1	4	0	14 (Note: Four appearances in UEFA Champions League, ten appearances in UEFA Europa League)	0	—		43	1
Red Bull Salzburg	Total		110	9	19	0	44	0	—		173	13
Borussia Mönchengladbach	2019–20	Bundesliga	31	1	2	0	6 (Note: Appearances in UEFA Europa League)	0	—		39	1
Borussia Mönchengladbach	2020–21	Bundesliga	33	2	4	0	8 (Note: Appearances in UEFA Champions League)	0	—		45	2
Borussia Mönchengladbach	2021–22	Bundesliga	21	1	2	0	—		—		23	1
Borussia Mönchengladbach	2022–23	Bundesliga	17	0	1	0	—		—		18	0
Borussia Mönchengladbach	2023–24	Bundesliga	15	0	1	0	—		—		16	0
Borussia Mönchengladbach	2024–25	Bundesliga	19	1	1	0	—		—		20	1
Borussia Mönchengladbach	Total		136	5	11	0	14	0	—		161	5
Red Bull Salzburg	2024–25	Austrian Bundesliga	—		—		—		3 (Note: Appearances in FIFA Club World Cup)	0	3	0
Red Bull Salzburg	2025–26	Austrian Bundesliga	25	1	3	0	10 (Note: Four appearances in UEFA Champions League, six appearances in UEFA Europa League)	0	—		38	1
Red Bull Salzburg	2026–27	Austrian Bundesliga	1	0	1	1	0	0	—		2	1
Red Bull Salzburg	Total		26	1	4	1	10	0	3	0	43	2
Career total			391	22	39	2	68	1	5	0	503	25

=== International ===
As of match played 23 March 2024

Appearances and goals by national team and year
National team	Year	Apps	Goals
Austria	2017	3	0
Austria	2018	9	0
Austria	2019	6	1
Austria	2020	7	0
Austria	2021	8	1
Austria	2022	5	0
Austria	2024	1	0
Total		39	2

Scores and results list Austria's goal tally first, score column indicates score after each Lainer goal.

List of international goals scored by Stefan Lainer
No.	Date	Venue	Opponent	Score	Result	Competition
1	16 November 2019	Ernst-Happel-Stadion, Vienna, Austria	North Macedonia	2–0	2–1	UEFA Euro 2020 qualifying
2	13 June 2021	Arena Națională, Bucharest, Romania	North Macedonia	1–0	3–1	UEFA Euro 2020

== Honours ==
Red Bull Salzburg

- Austrian Bundesliga: 2015–16, 2016–17, 2017–18, 2018–19
- Austrian Cup: 2015–16, 2016–17, 2018–19

Individual

- UEFA Europa League Squad of the Season: 2017–18
- Austrian Bundesliga Team of the Year: 2016–17, 2017–18, 2018–19
