= Netherlands national football team results (2010–2019) =

- Win Draw Loss

This is a list of football games played by the Netherlands national football team between 2010 and 2019. The Netherlands began this period by reaching and losing the 2010 World Cup final 0–1 to Spain and ended this period by reaching and losing the 2019 Nations League final 0–1 to Portugal. In the meantime, they secured qualification for Euro 2012 with only one loss in the qualifiers, but then lost all three matches of the group stages, and also secured qualification for the 2014 World Cup with an impressive unbeaten record, and at the tournament the Dutch were able to bounce back from their disappointing 2012 Euro campaign by finishing third. However, the results worsen greatly in the next years as they failed to qualify for both Euro 2016 and the 2018 World Cup.

The overall balance over the course of the decade was positive, with 72 wins versus 27 losses and 22 draws.

== Matches ==
=== 2010 ===
3 March Friendly	Netherlands	2–1	United States	Amsterdam, Netherlands
20:45 UTC+1	Kuyt 40'; Huntelaar 73'	Report	Bocanegra 89'	Stadium: Amsterdam ArenA; Attendance: 46,630; Referee: Cüneyt Çakır (Turkey)

26 May Friendly	Netherlands	2–1	Mexico	Freiburg, Germany
20:00 UTC+2	van Persie 17', 41'	Report	Hernández 74'	Stadium: Badenova-Stadion; Attendance: 22,000; Referee: Manuel Gräfe (Germany)

1 June Friendly	Netherlands	4–1	Ghana	Rotterdam, Netherlands
20:30 UTC+2	Kuyt 30'; van der Vaart 72'; Sneijder 81'; van Persie 87' (pen.)	Report	Gyan 78'	Stadium: De Kuip; Attendance: 45,000; Referee: Svein Oddvar Moen (Norway)

5 June Friendly	Netherlands	6–1	Hungary	Amsterdam, Netherlands
14:00 UTC+2	van Persie 21'; Sneijder 56'; Robben 64', 78'; van Bommel 71'; Elia 74'	Report	Dzsudzsák 6'	Stadium: Amsterdam ArenA; Attendance: 45,000; Referee: Florian Meyer (Germany)

14 June 2010 FIFA World Cup Group E	Netherlands	2–0	Denmark	Johannesburg, South Africa
13:30 UTC+2	Agger 46' (o.g.); Kuyt 85'	Report		Stadium: Soccer City; Attendance: 83,465; Referee: Stéphane Lannoy (France)

19 June 2010 FIFA World Cup Group E	Netherlands	1–0	Japan	Durban, South Africa
13:30 UTC+2	Sneijder 53'	Report		Stadium: Moses Mabhida Stadium; Attendance: 62,010; Referee: Héctor Baldassi (Argentina)

24 June 2010 FIFA World Cup Group E	Cameroon	1–2	Netherlands	Cape Town, South Africa
20:30 UTC+2	Eto'o 65' (pen.)	Report	v. Persie 36'; Huntelaar 83'	Stadium: Cape Town Stadium; Attendance: 63,093; Referee: Pablo Pozo (Chile)

28 June 2010 FIFA World Cup Round of 16	Netherlands	2–1	Slovakia	Durban, South Africa
16:00 UTC+2	Robben 18'; Sneijder 84'	fifa.com/fifaplus/en/match-centre/match/17/249715/249717/300111113?date=2010-06-28	Vittek 90+4' (pen.)	Stadium: Moses Mabhida Stadium; Attendance: 61,962; Referee: Alberto Undiano Mallenco (Spain)

2 July 2010 FIFA World Cup Quarter-final	Netherlands	2–1	Brazil	Port Elizabeth, South Africa
16:00 UTC+2	Sneijder 53', 68'	Report	Robinho 10' Melo (red card) 73'	Stadium: Nelson Mandela Bay Stadium; Attendance: 40,186; Referee: Yuichi Nishimura (Japan)

6 July 2010 FIFA World Cup Semi-final	Uruguay	2–3	Netherlands	Cape Town, South Africa
20:30 UTC+2	Forlán 41'; M. Pereira 90+2'	Report	van Bronckhorst 18'; Sneijder 70'; Robben 73'	Stadium: Cape Town Stadium; Attendance: 62,479; Referee: Ravshan Irmatov (Uzbekistan)

11 July 2010 FIFA World Cup Final	Netherlands	0–1 (a.e.t.)	Spain	Johannesburg, South Africa
20:30 UTC+2		Report	Iniesta 116'	Stadium: Soccer City; Attendance: 84,490; Referee: Howard Webb (England)

11 August Friendly	Ukraine	1–1	Netherlands	Donetsk, Ukraine
20:00 UTC+3	Aliyev 75'	Report	Lens 73'	Stadium: Donbas Arena; Attendance: 18,051; Referee: Damir Skomina (Slovenia)

3 September UEFA Euro 2012 qualifying	San Marino	0–5	Netherlands	Serravalle, San Marino
20:45 UTC+2		Report	Kuyt 16' (pen.); Huntelaar 38', 48', 66'; v. Nistelrooy 89'	Stadium: Stadio Olimpico; Attendance: 4,127; Referee: Simon Lee Evans (Wales)

7 September UEFA Euro 2012 qualifying	Netherlands	2–1	Finland	Rotterdam, Netherlands
20:30 UTC+2	Huntelaar 7', 16' (pen.)	Report	Forssell 18'	Stadium: De Kuip; Attendance: 25,000; Referee: Alexey Nikolaev (Russia)

8 October UEFA Euro 2012 qualifying	Moldova	0–1	Netherlands	Chişinău, Moldova
21:30 UTC+3		Report	Huntelaar 37'	Stadium: Zimbru Stadium; Attendance: 10,500; Referee: Florian Meyer (Germany)

12 October UEFA Euro 2012 qualifying	Netherlands	4–1	Sweden	Amsterdam, Netherlands
20:30 UTC+2	Huntelaar 4', 55'; Afellay 37', 59'	Report	Granqvist 69'	Stadium: Amsterdam ArenA; Attendance: 46,000; Referee: Stéphane Lannoy (France)

17 November Friendly	Netherlands	1–0	Turkey	Amsterdam, Netherlands
20:30 UTC+1	Huntelaar 52'	Report		Stadium: Amsterdam ArenA; Attendance: 35,500; Referee: Viktor Kassai (Hungary)

=== 2011 ===
9 February Friendly	Netherlands	3–1	Austria	Eindhoven, Netherlands
20:30 UTC+1	Sneijder 28'; Huntelaar 48'; Kuyt 70' (pen.)	Report	Arnautovic 84' (pen.)	Stadium: Philips Stadion; Attendance: 33,000; Referee: Felix Brych (Germany)

25 March UEFA Euro 2012 qualifying	Hungary	0–4	Netherlands	Budapest, Hungary
20:30 UTC+1		Report	Van der Vaart 8'; Afellay 45'; Kuyt 54'; Van Persie 62'	Stadium: Stadium Puskás Ferenc; Attendance: 23,817; Referee: Carlos Velasco Carballo (Spain)

29 March UEFA Euro 2012 qualifying	Netherlands	5–3	Hungary	Amsterdam, Netherlands
20:30 UTC+2	Van Persie 13'; Sneijder 61'; Van Nistelrooy 73'; Kuyt 78', 81'	Report	Rudolf 46'; Gera 50', 75'	Stadium: Amsterdam Arena; Attendance: 51,774; Referee: Svein Oddvar Moen (Norway)

4 June Friendly	Brazil	0–0	Netherlands	Goiânia, Brazil
16:10 UTC-3		Report		Stadium: Estádio Serra Dourada; Attendance: 36,449; Referee: Carlos Amarilla (Paraguay)

8 June Copa Confraternidad de Antel	Uruguay	1–1 (4–3 p)	Netherlands	Montevideo, Uruguay
15:30 UTC-3	Suárez 82'	Report	Kuyt 90+1'	Stadium: Estadio Centenario; Attendance: 55,000; Referee: Néstor Pitana (Argentina)
	Penalties
	Cavani (penalty scored); Hernández (penalty scored); Victorino (penalty scored); Lodeiro (penalty missed); Á. Pereira (penalty scored)		(penalty missed) Van Persie; (penalty scored) Schaars; (penalty scored) L. De Jong; (penalty missed) Elia; (penalty scored) Heitinga

2 September UEFA Euro 2012 qualifying	Netherlands	11–0	San Marino	Eindhoven, Netherlands
20:30 UTC+2	Van Persie 7', 65', 67', 79'; Sneijder 12', 87'; Heitinga 17'; Kuyt 49'; Huntelaar 56', 77'; Wijnaldum 89'	Report		Stadium: Philips Stadion; Attendance: 35,000; Referee: Liran Liany (Israel)

6 September UEFA Euro 2012 qualifying	Finland	0–2	Netherlands	Helsinki, Finland
20:00 UTC+3		Report	Strootman 29'; L. de Jong 90+3'	Stadium: Olympic Stadium; Attendance: 21,580; Referee: Manuel Gräfe (Germany)

7 October UEFA Euro 2012 qualifying	Netherlands	1–0	Moldova	Rotterdam, Netherlands
20:30 UTC+2	Huntelaar 40'	Report		Stadium: De Kuip; Attendance: 47,226; Referee: Matej Jug (Slovenia)

11 October UEFA Euro 2012 qualifying	Sweden	3–2	Netherlands	Solna, Sweden
20:15 UTC+2	Källström 14'; Larsson 52' (pen.); Toivonen 53'	Report	Huntelaar 23'; Kuyt 50'	Stadium: Råsunda Stadium; Attendance: 33,066; Referee: Cüneyt Çakır (Turkey)

11 November Friendly	Netherlands	0–0	Switzerland	Amsterdam, Netherlands
20:30 UTC+1		Report		Stadium: Amsterdam ArenA; Attendance: 50,000; Referee: Jonas Eriksson (Sweden)

15 November Friendly	Germany	3–0	Netherlands	Hamburg, Germany
20:45 UTC+2	Müller 15'; Klose 26'; Özil 66'	Report		Stadium: Imtech Arena; Attendance: 51,500; Referee: Cüneyt Çakır (Turkey)

=== 2012 ===
29 February Friendly	England	2–3	Netherlands	London, England
21:00 UTC+0	Cahill 85'; Young 90+1'	Report	Robben 58', 90+2'; Huntelaar 59'	Stadium: Wembley Stadium; Attendance: 76,283; Referee: Felix Brych (Germany)

26 May Friendly	Netherlands	1–2	Bulgaria	Amsterdam, Netherlands
20:00 UTC+2	Van Persie 45'	Report	Popov 50' (pen.); Mitsanski 90+3'	Stadium: Amsterdam Arena; Attendance: 51,000; Referee: Fernando Teixeira Vitienes (Spain)

30 May Friendly	Netherlands	2–0	Slovakia	Rotterdam, Netherlands
20:30 UTC+2	Saláta 7' (o.g.); Van Der Vaart 75'	Report		Stadium: De Kuip; Attendance: 51,000; Referee: Vladislav Bezborodov (Russia)

2 June Friendly	Netherlands	6–0	Northern Ireland	Amsterdam, Netherlands
20:00 UTC+2	Van Persie 11', 29' (pen.); Sneijder 15'; Afellay 37', 51'; Vlaar 78'	Report		Stadium: Amsterdam Arena; Attendance: 50,000; Referee: Robert Schörgenhofer (Austria)

9 June UEFA Euro 2012 Group B	Netherlands	0–1	Denmark	Kharkiv, Ukraine
19:00 UTC+3		Report	Krohn-Dehli 24'	Stadium: Metalist Stadium; Attendance: 35,923; Referee: Damir Skomina (Slovenia)

13 June UEFA Euro 2012 Group B	Netherlands	1–2	Germany	Kharkiv, Ukraine
21:45 UTC+3	Van Persie 73'	Report	Gómez 24', 38'	Stadium: Metalist Stadium; Attendance: 37,750; Referee: Jonas Eriksson (Sweden)

17 June UEFA Euro 2012 Group B	Portugal	2–1	Netherlands	Kharkiv, Ukraine
21:45 UTC+3	Ronaldo 28', 74'	Report	Van Der Vaart 11'	Stadium: Metalist Stadium; Attendance: 37,445; Referee: Nicola Rizzoli (Italy)

15 August Friendly	Belgium	4–2	Netherlands	Brussels, Belgium
20:45 UTC+2	Benteke 20'; Mertens 75'; Lukaku 77'; Vertonghen 80'	Report	Narsingh 54'; Huntelaar 55'	Stadium: King Baudouin Stadium; Attendance: 50,000; Referee: Martin Atkinson (England)

7 September 2014 FIFA World Cup qualification	Netherlands	2–0	Turkey	Amsterdam, Netherlands
20:30 UTC+2	Van Persie 17'; Narsingh 90+3'	Report		Stadium: Amsterdam Arena; Attendance: 49,500; Referee: Carlos Velasco Carballo (Spain)

11 September 2014 FIFA World Cup qualification	Hungary	1–4	Netherlands	Budapest, Hungary
20:30 UTC+2	Dzsudzsák 7' (pen.)	Report	Lens 3', 53'; Martins Indi 19'; Huntelaar 75'	Stadium: Puskás Ferenc Stadion; Attendance: 22,700; Referee: Pedro Proença (Portugal)

12 October 2014 FIFA World Cup qualification	Netherlands	3–0	Andorra	Rotterdam, Netherlands
20:30 UTC+2	Van Der Vaart 7'; Huntelaar 15'; Schaken 50'	Report		Stadium: De Kuip; Attendance: 43,000; Referee: Aleksei Kulbakov (Belarus)

16 October 2014 FIFA World Cup qualification	Romania	1–4	Netherlands	Bucharest, Romania
21:00 UTC+3	Marica 40'	Report	Lens 9'; Martins Indi 29'; Van Der Vaart 45+1' (pen.); Van Persie 86'	Stadium: Arena Națională; Attendance: 53,329; Referee: Craig Thomson (Scotland)

14 November Friendly	Netherlands	0–0	Germany	Amsterdam, Netherlands
20:30 UTC+1		Report		Stadium: Amsterdam Arena; Attendance: 51,000; Referee: Pedro Proença (Portugal)

=== 2013 ===
6 February Friendly	Netherlands	1–1	Italy	Amsterdam, Netherlands
20:30 UTC+1	Lens 33'	Report	Verratti 90+1'	Stadium: Amsterdam Arena; Attendance: 45,000; Referee: Cüneyt Çakır (Turkey)

22 March 2014 FIFA World Cup qualification	Netherlands	3–0	Estonia	Amsterdam, Netherlands
20:30 UTC+1	Van Der Vaart 47'; Van Persie 72'; Schaken 84'	Report		Stadium: Amsterdam Arena; Attendance: 48,675; Referee: Vitali Meshkov (Russia)

26 March 2014 FIFA World Cup qualification	Netherlands	4–0	Romania	Amsterdam, Netherlands
20:30 UTC+1	Van Der Vaart 12'; Van Persie 56', 65' (pen.); Lens 90'	Report		Stadium: Amsterdam Arena; Attendance: 47,496; Referee: Mark Clattenburg (England)

7 June Friendly	Indonesia	0–3	Netherlands	Jakarta, Indonesia
20:30 UTC+7		Report	S. de Jong 57', 67'; Robben 90'	Stadium: Gelora Bung Karno Stadium; Attendance: 80,000; Referee: Nagor Amir Noor Mohamed (Malaysia)

11 June Friendly	China	0–2	Netherlands	Beijing, China
20:00 UTC+8		Report	Van Persie 11' (pen.); Sneijder 66'	Stadium: Workers Stadium; Attendance: 35,000; Referee: Chris Beath (Australia)

14 August Friendly	Portugal	1–1	Netherlands	Faro, Portugal
21:30 UTC+1	Ronaldo 87'	Report	Strootman 17'	Stadium: Estádio Algarve; Attendance: 26,000; Referee: Paolo Mazzoleni (Italy)

6 September 2014 FIFA World Cup qualification	Estonia	2–2	Netherlands	Tallinn, Estonia
21:30 UTC+3	Vassiljev 18', 57'	Report	Robben 2'; Van Persie 90+4' (pen.)	Stadium: A. Le Coq Arena; Attendance: 10,210; Referee: Serhiy Boyko (Ukraine)

10 September 2014 FIFA World Cup qualification	Andorra	0–2	Netherlands	Andorra la Vella, Andorra
20:30 UTC+2		Report	Van Persie 50', 54'	Stadium: Estadi Comunal; Attendance: 1,100; Referee: Ante Vučemilović-Šimunović Jr. (Croatia)

11 October 2014 FIFA World Cup qualification	Netherlands	8–1	Hungary	Amsterdam, Netherlands
20:30 UTC+2	Van Persie 16', 44', 53'; Strootman 25'; Lens 38'; Devecseri 65' (o.g.); Van der Vaart 86'; Robben 90'	Report	Dzsudzsák 47' (pen.)	Stadium: Amsterdam Arena; Attendance: 52,027; Referee: Martin Atkinson (England)

15 October 2014 FIFA World Cup qualification	Turkey	0–2	Netherlands	Istanbul, Turkey
21:00 UTC+3		Report	Robben 8'; Sneijder 47'	Stadium: Şükrü Saracoğlu Stadium; Attendance: 41,814; Referee: Olegário Benquerença (Portugal)

16 November Friendly	Japan	2–2	Netherlands	Genk, Belgium
13:15 UTC+1	Ōsako 44'; Honda 60'	Report	Van der Vaart 13'; Robben 39'	Stadium: Cristal Arena; Attendance: 13,616; Referee: Serge Gumienny (Belgium)

19 November Friendly	Netherlands	0–0	Colombia	Amsterdam, Netherlands
20:30 UTC+1		Report		Stadium: Amsterdam Arena; Attendance: 51,000; Referee: Florian Meyer (Germany)

=== 2014 ===
5 March Friendly	France	2–0	Netherlands	Paris, France
21:00 (UTC+1)	Benzema 32'; Matuidi 41'	Report		Stadium: Stade de France; Attendance: 80,000; Referee: Martin Atkinson (England)

17 May Friendly	Netherlands	1–1	Ecuador	Amsterdam, Netherlands
20:30 (UTC+2)	Van Persie 37'	Report	Montero 9'	Stadium: Amsterdam Arena; Attendance: 50,000; Referee: Pavel Královec (Czech Republic)

31 May Friendly	Netherlands	1–0	Ghana	Rotterdam, Netherlands
20:30 (UTC+2)	Van Persie 5'	Report		Stadium: De Kuip; Attendance: 48,000; Referee: Carlos Miguel Taborda Xistra (Portugal)

4 June Friendly	Netherlands	2–0	Wales	Amsterdam, Netherlands
20:30 (UTC+2)	Robben 32'; Lens 76'	Report		Stadium: Amsterdam Arena; Attendance: 51,000; Referee: Bülent Yıldırım (Turkey)

13 June 2014 FIFA World Cup Group B	Spain	1–5	Netherlands	Salvador, Brazil
16:00 (UTC−3)	Alonso 27' (pen.)	Report	Van Persie 44', 72'; Robben 53', 80'; De Vrij 65'	Stadium: Arena Fonte Nova; Attendance: 48,173; Referee: Nicola Rizzoli (Italy)

18 June 2014 FIFA World Cup Group B	Australia	2–3	Netherlands	Porto Alegre, Brazil
13:00 (UTC−3)	Cahill 21'; Jedinak 54' (pen.)	Report	Robben 20'; Van Persie 58'; Depay 68'	Stadium: Estádio Beira-Rio; Attendance: 42,877; Referee: Djamel Haimoudi (Algeria)

23 June 2014 FIFA World Cup Group B	Netherlands	2–0	Chile	São Paulo, Brazil
13:00 (UTC−3)	Fer 77'; Depay 90+2'	Report		Stadium: Arena de São Paulo; Attendance: 62,996; Referee: Bakary Gassama (Gambia)

29 June 2014 FIFA World Cup Round of 16	Netherlands	2–1	Mexico	Fortaleza, Brazil
13:00 (UTC−3)	Sneijder 88'; Huntelaar 90+4' (pen.)	Report	G. dos Santos 48'	Stadium: Estádio Castelão; Attendance: 58,817; Referee: Pedro Proença (Portugal)

5 July 2014 FIFA World Cup Quarter-final	Netherlands	0–0 (a.e.t.) (4–3 p)	Costa Rica	Salvador, Brazil
17:00 (UTC−3)		Report		Stadium: Arena Fonte Nova; Attendance: 51,179; Referee: Ravshan Irmatov (Uzbekistan)
	Penalties
	Van Persie (penalty scored); Robben (penalty scored); Sneijder (penalty scored); Kuyt (penalty scored)		(penalty scored) Borges; (penalty missed) Ruiz; (penalty scored) González; (penalty scored) Bolaños; (penalty missed) Umaña

9 July 2014 FIFA World Cup Semi-final	Netherlands	0–0 (a.e.t.) (2–4 p)	Argentina	São Paulo, Brazil
17:00 (UTC−3)		Report		Stadium: Arena de São Paulo; Attendance: 63,267; Referee: Cüneyt Çakır (Turkey)
	Penalties
	Vlaar (penalty missed); Robben (penalty scored); Sneijder (penalty missed); Kuyt (penalty scored)		(penalty scored) Messi; (penalty scored) Garay; (penalty scored) Agüero; (penalty scored) Rodríguez

12 July 2014 FIFA World Cup Third place match	Brazil	0–3	Netherlands	Brasília, Brazil
17:00 (UTC−3)		Report	Van Persie 3' (pen.); Blind 17'; Wijnaldum 90+1'	Stadium: Estádio Nacional Mané Garrincha; Attendance: 68,034; Referee: Djamel Haimoudi (Algeria)

4 September Friendly	Italy	2–0	Netherlands	Bari, Italy
20:45 (UTC+2)	Immobile 3'; De Rossi 10' (pen.)	Report		Stadium: Stadio San Nicola; Attendance: 50,000; Referee: Sergei Karasev (Russia)

9 September UEFA Euro 2016 qualifying	Czech Republic	2–1	Netherlands	Prague, Czech Republic
20:45 (UTC+2)	Dočkal 22'; Pilař 90+1'	Report	de Vrij 55'	Stadium: Generali Arena; Attendance: 17,946; Referee: Gianluca Rocchi (Italy)

10 October UEFA Euro 2016 qualifying	Netherlands	3–1	Kazakhstan	Amsterdam, Netherlands
20:45 (UTC+2)	Huntelaar 62'; Afellay 82'; Van Persie 89' (pen.)	Report	Abdulin 17'	Stadium: Amsterdam Arena; Attendance: 47,500; Referee: Matej Jug (Slovenia)

13 October UEFA Euro 2016 qualifying	Iceland	2–0	Netherlands	Reykjavík, Iceland
18:45 (UTC±0)	G. Sigurðsson 10' (pen.), 42'	Report		Stadium: Laugardalsvöllur; Attendance: 9,760; Referee: Carlos Velasco Carballo (Spain)

12 November Friendly	Netherlands	2–3	Mexico	Amsterdam, Netherlands
20:30 (UTC+1)	Sneijder 49'; Blind 74'	Report1; Report2	Vela 8', 62'; J. Hernandez 69'	Stadium: Amsterdam Arena; Attendance: 40,500; Referee: Szymon Marciniak (Poland)

16 November UEFA Euro 2016 qualifying	Netherlands	6–0	Latvia	Amsterdam, Netherlands
18:00 (UTC+1)	Van Persie 6'; Robben 35', 82'; Huntelaar 42', 89'; Bruma 78'	Report		Stadium: Amsterdam Arena; Attendance: 47,500; Referee: Liran Liany (Israel)

=== 2015 ===
28 March UEFA Euro 2016 qualifying	Netherlands	1–1	Turkey	Amsterdam, Netherlands
20:45 CET (UTC+01:00)	Huntelaar 90+2'	Report	Yılmaz 37'	Stadium: Amsterdam Arena; Attendance: 49,500; Referee: Felix Brych (Germany)

31 March Friendly	Netherlands	2–0	Spain	Amsterdam, Netherlands
20:45 CEST (UTC+02:00)	De Vrij 13'; Klaassen 16'	Report		Stadium: Amsterdam Arena; Attendance: 51,500; Referee: Willie Collum (Scotland)

5 June Friendly	Netherlands	3–4	United States	Amsterdam, Netherlands
20:30 CEST (UTC+02:00)	Huntelaar 27', 49'; Depay 53'	Report	Zardes 33'; Brooks 70'; Williams 89'; Wood 90'	Stadium: Amsterdam Arena; Attendance: 46,000; Referee: Martin Strömbergsson (Sweden)

12 June UEFA Euro 2016 qualifying	Latvia	0–2	Netherlands	Riga, Latvia
20:45 CEST (UTC+02:00); 21:45 EEST (UTC+03:00)		Report	Wijnaldum 67'; Narsingh 71'	Stadium: Skonto Stadium; Attendance: 8,067; Referee: Svein Oddvar Moen (Norway)

3 September UEFA Euro 2016 qualifying	Netherlands	0–1	Iceland	Amsterdam, Netherlands
20:45 CEST (UTC+02:00)		Report	G. Sigurðsson 51' (pen.)	Stadium: Amsterdam Arena; Attendance: 50,275; Referee: Milorad Mažić (Serbia)

6 September UEFA Euro 2016 qualifying	Turkey	3–0	Netherlands	Konya, Turkey
18:00 CEST (UTC+02:00); 19:00 EEST (UTC+03:00)	Özyakup 8'; Turan 26'; Yılmaz 86'	Report		Stadium: Torku Arena; Attendance: 41,007; Referee: Antonio Mateu Lahoz (Spain)

10 October UEFA Euro 2016 qualifying	Kazakhstan	1–2	Netherlands	Astana, Kazakhstan
18:00 CEST (UTC+02:00); 22:00 ALMT(UTC+06:00)	Kuat 90+6'	Report	Wijnaldum 33'; Sneijder 50'	Stadium: Astana Arena; Attendance: 20,716; Referee: Clément Turpin (France)

13 October UEFA Euro 2016 qualifying	Netherlands	2–3	Czech Republic	Amsterdam, Netherlands
20:45 CEST (UTC+02:00)	Huntelaar 70'; Van Persie 83'	Report	Kadeřábek 24'; Šural 35'; Van Persie 66' (o.g.)	Stadium: Amsterdam Arena; Attendance: 48,000; Referee: Damir Skomina (Slovenia)

13 November Friendly	Wales	2–3	Netherlands	Cardiff, Wales
19:45 GMT (UTC±00:00)	Ledley 45+3'; Huws 70'	Report	Dost 32'; Robben 54', 81'	Stadium: Cardiff City Stadium; Attendance: 25,699; Referee: Benoît Bastien (France)

=== 2016 ===
25 March Friendly	Netherlands	2–3	France	Amsterdam, Netherlands
20:45 CET (UTC+01:00)	De Jong 47'; Afellay 86'	Report	Griezmann 6'; Giroud 13'; Matuidi 88'	Stadium: Amsterdam Arena; Attendance: 46,103; Referee: Felix Zwayer (Germany)

29 March Friendly	England	1–2	Netherlands	London, England
20:00 BST (UTC+01:00)	Vardy 41'	Report	Janssen 51' (pen.); Narsingh 77'	Stadium: Wembley Stadium; Attendance: 82,835; Referee: Antonio Mateu Lahoz (Spain)

27 May Friendly	Republic of Ireland	1–1	Netherlands	Dublin, Ireland
19:45 BST (UTC+01:00)	Long 30'	Report	De Jong 85'	Stadium: Aviva Stadium; Attendance: 42,438; Referee: Artur Soares Dias (Portugal)

1 June Friendly	Poland	1–2	Netherlands	Gdańsk, Poland
20:45 CEST (UTC+02:00)	Jędrzejczyk 60'	Report	Janssen 33'; Wijnaldum 76'	Stadium: Stadion Energa Gdańsk; Attendance: 40,392; Referee: Miroslav Zelinka (Czech Republic)

4 June Friendly	Austria	0–2	Netherlands	Vienna, Austria
20:30 CET (UTC+02:00)		Report	Janssen 9'; Wijnaldum 66'	Stadium: Ernst-Happel-Stadion; Attendance: 48,000; Referee: Alberto Undiano Mallenco (Spain)

1 September Friendly	Netherlands	1–2	Greece	Eindhoven, Netherlands
20:45 CEST (UTC+02:00)	Wijnaldum 14'	Report	Mitroglou 29'; Gianniotas 74'	Stadium: Philips Stadion; Attendance: 36,128; Referee: Mete Kalkavan (Turkey)

6 September 2018 FIFA World Cup qualification	Sweden	1–1	Netherlands	Solna, Sweden
20:45 CEST (UTC+02:00)	Berg 43'	Report (FIFA); Report (UEFA)	Sneijder 67'	Stadium: Friends Arena; Attendance: 36,128; Referee: Daniele Orsato (Italy)

7 October 2018 FIFA World Cup qualification	Netherlands	4–1	Belarus	Rotterdam, Netherlands
20:30 CEST (UTC+02:00)	Promes 15', 31'; Klaassen 55'; Janssen 64'	Report	Rios 47'	Stadium: De Kuip; Attendance: 41,200; Referee: Craig Thomson (Scotland)

10 October 2018 FIFA World Cup qualification	Netherlands	0–1	France	Amsterdam, Netherlands
20:45 CEST (UTC+02:00)		Report 1 Report2	Pogba 30'	Stadium: Amsterdam Arena; Attendance: 50,220; Referee: Damir Skomina (Slovenia)

9 November Friendly	Netherlands	1–1	Belgium	Amsterdam, Netherlands
20:45 CET (UTC+01:00)	Klaassen 38' (pen.)	Report	Carrasco 82'	Stadium: Amsterdam Arena; Attendance: 37,500; Referee: Szymon Marciniak (Poland)

13 November 2018 FIFA World Cup qualification	Luxembourg	1–3	Netherlands	Luxembourg City, Luxembourg
18:00 CET (UTC+01:00)	Chanot 44' (pen.)	Report	Robben 36'; Depay 58', 84'	Stadium: Stade Josy Barthel; Attendance: 8,000; Referee: Anthony Taylor (England)

=== 2017 ===
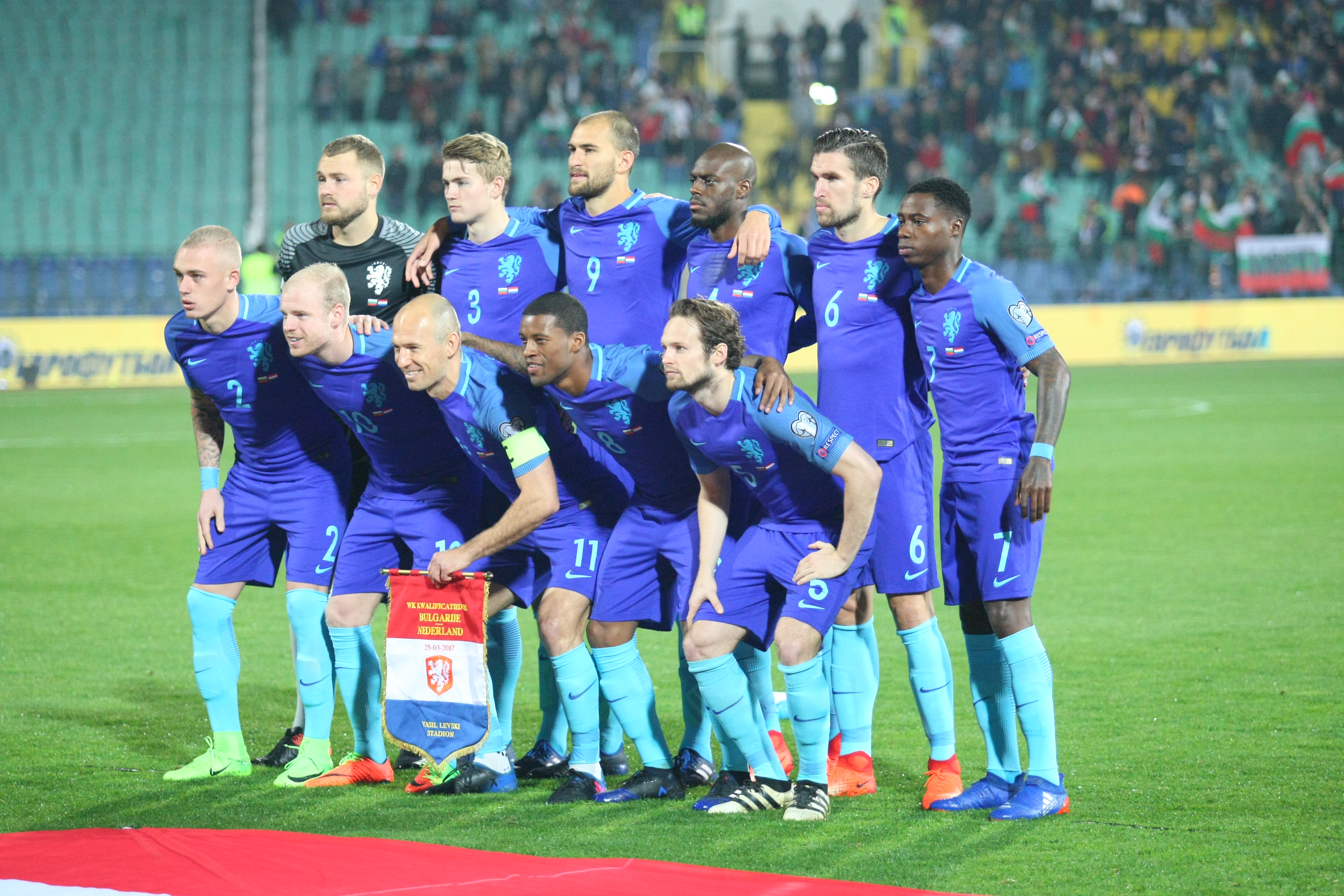
Netherlands team lining up before match against Bulgaria on 25 March 2017

25 March 2018 FIFA World Cup qualification	Bulgaria	2–0	Netherlands	Sofia, Bulgaria
20:45 (21:45 UTC+2)	Delev 5', 20'	Report (FIFA); Report (UEFA)		Stadium: Vasil Levski National Stadium; Attendance: 10,900; Referee: Willie Collum (Scotland)

28 March Friendly	Netherlands	1–2	Italy	Amsterdam, Netherlands
20:45 CEST (UTC+02:00)	Romagnoli 10' (o.g.)	Report	Éder 11'; Bonucci 32'	Stadium: Amsterdam Arena; Attendance: 46,228; Referee: Jonas Eriksson (Sweden)

31 May Friendly	Morocco	1–2	Netherlands	Agadir, Morocco
20:45 (UTC+02:00)	Boussoufa 72'	Report	Promes 22'; Janssen 68'	Stadium: Stade Adrar; Attendance: 25,000; Referee: Mahamadou Keita (Mali)

4 June Friendly	Netherlands	5–0	Ivory Coast	Rotterdam, Netherlands
19:30 CEST (UTC+02:00)	Veltman 13', 36'; Robben 32'; Klaassen 69'; Janssen 75'	Report		Stadium: De Kuip; Attendance: 51,777; Referee: Harald Lechner (Austria)

9 June 2018 FIFA World Cup qualification	Netherlands	5–0	Luxembourg	Rotterdam, Netherlands
20:45 (20:45 UTC+2)	Robben 21'; Sneijder 34'; Wijnaldum 62'; Promes 70'; Janssen 84' (pen.)	Report (FIFA); Report (UEFA)		Stadium: De Kuip; Attendance: 41,300; Referee: Bartosz Frankowski (Poland)

31 August 2018 FIFA World Cup qualification	France	4–0	Netherlands	Saint-Denis, France
20:45 (20:45 UTC+2)	Griezmann 14'; Lemar 73', 88'; Mbappé 90+1'	Report (FIFA); Report (UEFA)		Stadium: Stade de France; Attendance: 79,551; Referee: Gianluca Rocchi (Italy)

3 September 2018 FIFA World Cup qualification	Netherlands	3–1	Bulgaria	Amsterdam, Netherlands
18:00 (18:00 UTC+2)	Pröpper 7', 80'; Robben 67'	Report (FIFA); Report (UEFA)	Kostadinov 69'	Stadium: Amsterdam Arena; Attendance: 47,079; Referee: Tasos Sidiropoulos (Greece)

7 October 2018 FIFA World Cup qualification	Belarus	1–3	Netherlands	Barysaw, Belarus
20:45 (21:45 UTC+3)	Valadzko 55'	Report (FIFA); Report (UEFA)	Propper 24'; Robben 84' (pen.); Depay 90+3'	Stadium: Borisov Arena; Attendance: 6,850; Referee: Michael Oliver (England)

10 October 2018 FIFA World Cup qualification	Netherlands	2–0	Sweden	Amsterdam, Netherlands
20:45 (UTC+2)	Robben 16', 40'	Report (FIFA); Report (UEFA)		Stadium: Amsterdam Arena; Attendance: 41,244; Referee: Sergei Karasev (Russia)

9 November Friendly	Scotland	0–1	Netherlands	Aberdeen, Scotland
19:45 (UTC+0)		Report	Depay 40'	Stadium: Pittodrie Stadium; Attendance: 17,883; Referee: Ruddy Buquet (France)

14 November Friendly	Romania	0–3	Netherlands	Bucharest, Romania
21:00 (UTC+2)		Report	Depay 47'; Babel 57' de Jong 81'	Stadium: Arena Națională; Attendance: 25,000; Referee: Christos Nikolaidis (Cyprus)

=== 2018 ===
23 March Friendly	Netherlands	0–1	England	Amsterdam, Netherlands
20:45 CET		Report	Lingard 59'	Stadium: Johan Cruyff Arena; Attendance: 51,500; Referee: Jesús Gil Manzano (Spain)

26 March Friendly	Portugal	0–3	Netherlands	Genève, Switzerland
20:30 CEST (UTC+2)		Report	Depay 11'; Babel 32'; Van Dijk 45+2'	Stadium: Stade de Genève; Attendance: 20,006; Referee: Ruddy Buquet (France)

31 May Friendly	Slovakia	1–1	Netherlands	Trnava, Slovakia
20:45 CEST (UTC+2)	Nemec 8'	Report	Promes 59'	Stadium: Štadión Antona Malatinského; Attendance: 16,000; Referee: Bartosz Frankowski (Poland)

4 June Friendly	Italy	1–1	Netherlands	Turin, Italy
20:45 CEST (UTC+2)	Zaza 67'	Report	Aké 88'	Stadium: Allianz Stadium; Attendance: 20,500; Referee: Vladislav Bezborodov (Russia)

6 September Friendly	Netherlands	2–1	Peru	Amsterdam, Netherlands
20:45 CEST (UTC+2)	Depay 60', 83'	Report	Aquino 13'	Stadium: Johan Cruyff Arena; Attendance: 40,127; Referee: Tobias Stieler (Germany)

9 September 2018–19 UEFA Nations League group stage	France	2–1	Netherlands	Saint–Denis, France
20:45 CEST (UTC+2)	Mbappé 14'; Giroud 75'	Report	Babel 67'	Stadium: Stade de France; Attendance: 76,452; Referee: Alberto Undiano Mallenco (Spain)

13 October 2018–19 UEFA Nations League group stage	Netherlands	3–0	Germany	Amsterdam, Netherlands
20:45 CEST (UTC+2)	Van Dijk 30'; Depay 87'; Wijnaldum 90+3'	Report		Stadium: Johan Cruyff Arena; Attendance: 52,536; Referee: Cüneyt Çakır (Turkey)

16 October Friendly	Belgium	1–1	Netherlands	Brussels, Belgium
20:45 CEST (UTC+2)	Mertens 5'	Report	Groeneveld 27'	Stadium: King Baudouin Stadium; Attendance: 30,000; Referee: Artur Soares Dias (Portugal)

16 November 2018–19 UEFA Nations League group stage	Netherlands	2–0	France	Rotterdam, Netherlands
20:45 CET (UTC+1)	Wijnaldum 44'; Depay 90+6' (pen.)	Report		Stadium: De Kuip; Attendance: 44,366; Referee: Anthony Taylor (England)

19 November 2018–19 UEFA Nations League group stage	Germany	2–2	Netherlands	Gelsenkirchen, Germany
20:45 CET (UTC+1)	Werner 9'; Sané 20'	Report	Promes 85'; Van Dijk 90+1'	Stadium: Veltins-Arena; Attendance: 42,186; Referee: Ovidiu Hațegan (Romania)

=== 2019 ===
21 March UEFA Euro 2020 qualifying	Netherlands	4–0	Belarus	Rotterdam, Netherlands
20:45 CET (UTC+1)	Depay 1', 55' (pen.); Wijnaldum 21'; Van Dijk 86'	Report		Stadium: De Kuip; Attendance: 38,604; Referee: Davide Massa (Italy)

24 March UEFA Euro 2020 qualifying	Netherlands	2–3	Germany	Amsterdam, Netherlands
20:45 CET (UTC+1)	de Ligt 48'; Depay 63'	Report	Sané 15'; Gnabry 34'; Schulz 90'	Stadium: Johan Cruyff Arena; Attendance: 51,694; Referee: Jesús Gil Manzano (Spain)

6 June 2019 UEFA Nations League semi-final	Netherlands	3–1 (a.e.t.)	England	Guimarães, Portugal
19:45 CEST (UTC+2)	de Ligt 73'; Walker 97' (o.g.); Promes 114'	Report	Rashford 32' (pen.)	Stadium: Estádio D. Afonso Henriques; Attendance: 25,711; Referee: Clément Turpin (France)

9 June 2019 UEFA Nations League Final	Portugal	1–0	Netherlands	Porto, Portugal
19:45 CEST (UTC+2)	Guedes 60'	Report		Stadium: Estádio do Dragão; Attendance: 43,199; Referee: Alberto Undiano Mallenco (Spain)

6 September UEFA Euro 2020 qualifying	Germany	2–4	Netherlands	Hamburg, Germany
20:45 CEST (UTC+2)	Gnabry 9'; Kroos 73' (pen.)	Report	F. de Jong 59'; Tah 66' (o.g.); Malen 79'; Wijnaldum 90+1'	Stadium: Volksparkstadion; Attendance: 51,299; Referee: Artur Soares Dias (Portugal)

9 September UEFA Euro 2020 qualifying	Estonia	0–4	Netherlands	Tallinn, Estonia
21:45 EEST (UTC+3)		Report	Babel 17', 47'; Depay 76'; Wijnaldum 87'	Stadium: A. Le Coq Arena; Attendance: 11,006; Referee: Serhiy Boiko (Ukraine)

10 October UEFA Euro 2020 qualifying	Netherlands	3–1	Northern Ireland	Rotterdam, Netherlands
20:45 CEST (UTC+2)	Depay 81', 90+4'; L. de Jong 90+1'	Report	Magennis 75'	Stadium: De Kuip; Attendance: 41,348; Referee: Benoît Bastien (France)

13 October UEFA Euro 2020 qualifying	Belarus	1–2	Netherlands	Barysaw, Belarus
19:00 FET (UTC+3)	Drahun 53'	Report	Wijnaldum 32', 41'	Stadium: Borisov Arena; Attendance: 21,639; Referee: Anastasios Sidiropoulos (Greece)

16 November UEFA Euro 2020 qualifying	Northern Ireland	0–0	Netherlands	Belfast, Northern Ireland
19:45 GMT (UTC±0)		Report		Stadium: Windsor Park; Attendance: 18,404; Referee: Szymon Marciniak (Poland)

19 November UEFA Euro 2020 qualifying	Netherlands	5–0	Estonia	Amsterdam, Netherlands
20:45 CET (UTC+1)	Wijnaldum 6', 66', 79'; Aké 19'; Boadu 87'	Report		Stadium: Johan Cruijff Arena; Attendance: 50,386; Referee: Davide Massa (Italy)
