= 2014–15 in Dutch football =

Football in Netherlands
- Season: 2014–15

Men's football
- Johan Cruijff Schaal: PEC Zwolle

The 2014–15 season is the 126th season of competitive football in the Netherlands.

== Promotion and relegation ==
=== Pre-season ===
League	Promoted to league	Relegated from league
Eredivisie	Willem II; Dordrecht; Excelsior	Roda JC; N.E.C.; RKC
Eerste Divisie	No team from 2013–14 Topklasse willing to be promoted	None

== National teams ==
=== Netherlands national football team ===
==== 2014 FIFA World Cup ====
Pos	Team	Pld	W	D	L	GF	GA	GD	Pts	Qualification
1	Netherlands	3	3	0	0	10	3	+7	9	Advance to knockout stage
2	Chile	3	2	0	1	5	3	+2	6	Advance to knockout stage
3	Spain	3	1	0	2	4	7	−3	3	
4	Australia	3	0	0	3	3	9	−6	0	

Source: FIFA
Rules for classification: Tie-breaking criteria

13 June 2014 FIFA World Cup	Spain	1 – 5	Netherlands	Salvador, Brazil
16:00 (UTC−3)	Alonso 27' (pen.)	Report	Van Persie 44', 72'; Robben 53', 80'; De Vrij 65'	Stadium: Arena Fonte Nova; Attendance: 48,173; Referee: Nicola Rizzoli (Italy)

18 June 2014 FIFA World Cup	Australia	2 – 3	Netherlands	Porto Alegre, Brazil
13:00 (UTC−3)	Cahill 21'; Jedinak 54' (pen.)	Report	Robben 20'; Van Persie 58'; Memphis 68'	Stadium: Estádio Beira-Rio; Attendance: 42,877; Referee: Djamel Haimoudi (Algeria)

23 June 2014 FIFA World Cup	Netherlands	2 – 0	Chile	São Paulo, Brazil
13:00 (UTC−3)	Fer 77'; Memphis 90+2'	Report		Stadium: Arena de São Paulo; Attendance: 62,996; Referee: Bakary Gassama (Gambia)

29 June 2014 FIFA World Cup	Netherlands	2 – 1	Mexico	Fortaleza, Brazil
13:00 (UTC−3)	Sneijder 88'; Huntelaar 90+4' (pen.)	Report	G. dos Santos 48'	Stadium: Estádio Castelão; Attendance: 58,817; Referee: Pedro Proença (Portugal)

5 July 2014 FIFA World Cup	Netherlands	0 – 0 (a.e.t.) (4 – 3 p)	Costa Rica	Salvador, Brazil
17:00 (UTC−3)		Report		Stadium: Arena Fonte Nova; Attendance: 51,179; Referee: Ravshan Irmatov (Uzbekistan)
	Penalties
	Van Persie (penalty scored); Robben (penalty scored); Sneijder (penalty scored); Kuyt (penalty scored)		(penalty scored) Borges; (penalty missed) Ruiz; (penalty scored) González; (penalty scored) Bolaños; (penalty missed) Umaña

9 July 2014 FIFA World Cup	Netherlands	0 – 0 (a.e.t.) (2 – 4 p)	Argentina	São Paulo, Brazil
17:00 (UTC−3)		Report		Stadium: Arena de São Paulo; Attendance: 61,606; Referee: Cüneyt Çakır (Turkey)
	Penalties
	Vlaar (penalty missed); Robben (penalty scored); Sneijder (penalty missed); Kuyt (penalty scored)		(penalty scored) Messi; (penalty scored) Garay; (penalty scored) Agüero; (penalty scored) Rodríguez

12 July 2014 FIFA World Cup	Brazil	0 – 3	Netherlands	Brasília, Brazil
17:00 (UTC−3)		Report	Van Persie 3' (pen.); Blind 17'; Wijnaldum 90+1'	Stadium: Estádio Nacional Mané Garrincha; Attendance: 68,034; Referee: Djamel Haimoudi (Algeria)

==== UEFA Euro 2016 qualifying ====
Pos	Team	Pld	W	D	L	GF	GA	GD	Pts	Qualification	(Czech Republic)	(Iceland)	(Turkey)	(Netherlands)	(Kazakhstan)	(Latvia)
1	Czech Republic	10	7	1	2	19	14	+5	22	Qualify for final tournament	—	2–1	0–2	2–1	2–1	1–1
2	Iceland	10	6	2	2	17	6	+11	20	Qualify for final tournament	2–1	—	3–0	2–0	0–0	2–2
3	Turkey	10	5	3	2	14	9	+5	18	Qualify for final tournament	1–2	1–0	—	3–0	3–1	1–1
4	Netherlands	10	4	1	5	17	14	+3	13		2–3	0–1	1–1	—	3–1	6–0
5	Kazakhstan	10	1	2	7	7	18	−11	5 (Note: Head-to-head points: Kazakhstan 4, Latvia 1.)		2–4	0–3	0–1	1–2	—	0–0
6	Latvia	10	0	5	5	6	19	−13	5		1–2	0–3	1–1	0–2	0–1	—

Source: UEFA
Rules for classification: Qualification tiebreakers
Notes:

9 September 2014 UEFA Euro 2016 Q	Czech Republic	2 – 1	Netherlands	Prague
20:45 (UTC+2)	Dočkal 22'; Pilař 90+1'	Report	de Vrij 55'	Stadium: Generali Arena; Attendance: 17,946; Referee: Gianluca Rocchi (Italy)

10 October 2014 UEFA Euro 2016 Q	Netherlands	3 – 1	Kazakhstan	Amsterdam
20:45 (UTC+2)	Huntelaar 62'; Afellay 82'; Van Persie 89' (pen.)	Report	Abdulin 17'	Stadium: Amsterdam Arena; Attendance: 45,000; Referee: Matej Jug (Slovenia)

13 October 2014 UEFA Euro 2016 Q	Iceland	2 – 0	Netherlands	Reykjavík
18:45 (UTC±0)	G. Sigurðsson 10' (pen.), 42'	Report		Stadium: Laugardalsvöllur; Attendance: 10,000; Referee: Carlos Velasco Carballo (Spain)

16 November 2014 UEFA Euro 2016 Q	Netherlands	6 – 0	Latvia	Amsterdam
18:00 (UTC+1)	Van Persie 6'; Robben 35', 82'; Huntelaar 42', 89'; Bruma 78'	Report		Stadium: Amsterdam Arena; Attendance: 47,500; Referee: Liran Liany (Israel)

28 March 2015 UEFA Euro 2016 Q	Netherlands	1 – 1	Turkey	Amsterdam
20:45 (UTC+1)	Huntelaar 90+2'	Report	Yılmaz 37'	Stadium: Amsterdam Arena; Attendance: 49,500; Referee: Felix Brych (Germany)

12 June 2015 UEFA Euro 2016 Q	Latvia	0 – 2	Netherlands	Riga
21:45 (UTC+3)		Report	Wijnaldum 67'; Narsingh 71'	Stadium: Skonto stadions Attendance: 8,067; Referee: Svein Oddvar Moen (Norway)

==== International Friendlies ====
5 March Friendly	France	2 – 0	Netherlands	Paris, France
21:00 (UTC+1)	Benzema 32'; Matuidi 41'	Report		Stadium: Stade de France; Attendance: 80,000; Referee: Martin Atkinson (England)

17 May Friendly	Netherlands	1 – 1	Ecuador	Amsterdam, Netherlands
20:30 (UTC+2)	Van Persie 37'	Report	Montero 9'	Stadium: Amsterdam Arena; Attendance: 50,000; Referee: Pavel Královec (Czech Republic)

31 May Friendly	Netherlands	1 – 0	Ghana	Rotterdam, Netherlands
20:30 (UTC+2)	Van Persie 5'	Report		Stadium: De Kuip; Attendance: 51,117; Referee: Carlos Miguel Taborda Xistra (Portugal)

4 June Friendly	Netherlands	2 – 0	Wales	Amsterdam, Netherlands
20:30 (UTC+2)	Robben 32'; Lens 76'	Report		Stadium: Amsterdam Arena; Attendance: 51,000; Referee: Bülent Yıldırım (Turkey)

4 September Friendly	Italy	2 – 0	Netherlands	Bari, Italy
20:45 (UTC+2)	Immobile 3'; De Rossi 10' (pen.)	Report		Stadium: Stadio San Nicola; Attendance: 50,000; Referee: Sergei Karasev (Russia)

12 November Friendly	Netherlands	2 – 3	Mexico	Amsterdam, Netherlands
20:30 (UTC+1)	Sneijder 49'; Blind 74'	Report	Vela 8', 62'; J. Hernandez 69'	Stadium: Amsterdam Arena; Referee: Szymon Marciniak (Poland)

=== Netherlands women's national football team ===
==== 2015 FIFA Women's World Cup qualification (UEFA) ====
Pos	Team	Pld	W	D	L	GF	GA	GD	Pts	Qualification	Norway	Netherlands	Belgium	Portugal	Greece	Albania
1	Norway	10	9	0	1	41	5	+36	27	Women's World Cup	—	0–2	4–1	2–0	6–0	7–0
2	Netherlands	10	8	1	1	43	6	+37	25	Play-offs	1–2	—	1–1	3–2	7–0	10–1
3	Belgium	10	6	1	3	34	11	+23	19		1–2	0–2	—	4–1	11–0	2–0
4	Portugal	10	4	0	6	19	21	−2	12		0–2	0–7	0–1	—	1–0	7–1
5	Greece	10	1	0	9	6	49	−43	3 (Note: Greece scored more head-to-head goals than Albania)		0–5	0–6	1–7	1–5	—	4–0
6	Albania	10	1	0	9	3	54	−51	3		0–11	0–4	0–6	0–3	1–0	—

Source: UEFA
Rules for classification: Tiebreakers

===== Play-offs =====
Semifinal

Team 1	Agg.	Team 2	1st leg	2nd leg
Scotland	1–4	Netherlands	1–2	0–2

Final

Team 1	Agg.	Team 2	1st leg	2nd leg
Netherlands	3–2	Italy	1–1	2–1

== League season ==
=== Eredivisie ===
Pos	Team	Pld	W	D	L	GF	GA	GD	Pts	Qualification or relegation
1	PSV (C)	34	29	1	4	92	31	+61	88	Qualification for the Champions League group stage
2	Ajax	34	21	8	5	69	29	+40	71	Qualification for the Champions League third qualifying round
3	AZ	34	19	5	10	63	56	+7	62	Qualification for the Europa League third qualifying round
4	Feyenoord	34	17	8	9	56	39	+17	59	Qualification for the European competition play-offs
5	Vitesse (O)	34	16	10	8	66	43	+23	58	Qualification for the European competition play-offs
6	PEC Zwolle	34	16	5	13	59	43	+16	53	Qualification for the European competition play-offs
7	Heerenveen	34	13	11	10	53	46	+7	50	Qualification for the European competition play-offs
8	Groningen	34	11	13	10	49	53	−4	46	Qualification for the Europa League group stage (Note: Groningen qualified for the Europa League group stage by winning the 2014–15 KNVB Cup.)
9	Willem II	34	13	7	14	46	50	−4	46	
10	Twente (Note: FC Twente were deducted three points twice since they did not meet the financial standards set by the KNVB.)	34	13	10	11	56	51	+5	43	
11	Utrecht	34	11	8	15	60	62	−2	41	
12	Cambuur	34	11	8	15	46	56	−10	41	
13	ADO Den Haag	34	9	10	15	44	53	−9	37	
14	Heracles	34	11	4	19	47	64	−17	37	
15	Excelsior	34	6	14	14	47	63	−16	32	
16	NAC Breda (R)	34	6	10	18	36	68	−32	28	Qualification for the Relegation play-offs (Note: Ten teams, two from the Eredivisie and eight from the Eerste Divisie, played for two spots in the 2015–16 Eredivisie, the remaining eight teams play in the 2015–16 Eerste Divisie.)
17	Go Ahead Eagles (R)	34	7	6	21	29	59	−30	27	Qualification for the Europa League first qualifying round and for the relegation play-offs (Note: Go Ahead Eagles was awarded a spot in the 2015–16 UEFA Europa League first qualifying round because of its Fair Play ranking. They were also relegated to the 2015–16 Eerste Divisie after losing in the second round of the relegation play-offs.)
18	Dordrecht (R)	34	4	8	22	24	76	−52	20	Relegation to Eerste Divisie

Source: NUsport
Rules for classification: 1) points; 2) goal difference; 3) number of goals scored
(C) Champions; (O) Play-off winners; (R) Relegated

=== Eerste divisie ===
==== Winners by period ====
- First period (Weeks 1–9): N.E.C.

== Managerial changes ==
Team	Outgoing manager	Manner of departure	Date of vacancy	Position in table	Replaced by	Date of appointment
Heerenveen	(Netherlands) Marco van Basten	End of contract	1 July 2014	Pre-season	(Netherlands) Dwight Lodeweges	1 July 2014
AZ	(Netherlands) Dick Advocaat	End of contract	1 July 2014	Pre-season	(Netherlands) Marco van Basten	1 July 2014
Feyenoord	(Netherlands) Ronald Koeman	End of contract	1 July 2014	Pre-season	(Netherlands) Fred Rutten	1 July 2014
Utrecht	(Netherlands) Jan Wouters	Mutual consent	1 July 2014	Pre-season	(Netherlands) Rob Alflen	1 July 2014
Dordrecht	(Netherlands) Harry van den Ham	End of contract	1 July 2014	Pre-season	(Netherlands) Ernie Brandts	1 July 2014
Heracles Almelo	(Netherlands) Jan de Jonge	Sacked	31 August 2014	18th	(Netherlands) John Stegeman	17 September 2014
AZ	(Netherlands) Marco van Basten	Mutual consent	16 September 2014	12th	(Netherlands) John van den Brom	29 September 2014
NAC Breda	(Serbia) Nebojša Gudelj	Sacked	13 October 2014	15th	(Netherlands) Eric Hellemons (caretaker)	13 October 2014

== Deaths ==
- 13 July 2014: Joop van Basten (84), Professional football player, father of Marco van Basten
- 24 July 2014: Cees Heerschop (79), former PSV and N.E.C. defender.
- 20 September 2014: Erwin Sparendam (80)
- 28 September 2014: Joop Pattiselanno (79)
- 9 October 2014: Frans van Tuijl (89)
- 13 October 2014: Wally Jansen (69)
- 29 October 2014: Klas Ingesson, 46, former Sweden and PSV midfielder.
