= UEFA Euro 2020 qualifying Group C =

Football tournament qualifying stage

Group C of UEFA Euro 2020 qualifying was one of the ten groups to decide which teams would qualify for the UEFA Euro 2020 finals tournament. Group C consisted of five teams: Belarus, Estonia, Germany, Netherlands and Northern Ireland, where they played against each other home-and-away in a round-robin format.

The top two teams, Germany and Netherlands, qualified directly for the finals. Unlike previous editions, the participants of the play-offs were not decided based on results from the qualifying group stage, but instead based on their performance in the 2018–19 UEFA Nations League.

== Standings ==
Pos	Team	Pld	W	D	L	GF	GA	GD	Pts	Qualification	(Germany)	(Netherlands)	(Northern Ireland)	(Belarus)	(Estonia)
1	Germany	8	7	0	1	30	7	+23	21	Qualify for final tournament	—	2–4	6–1	4–0	8–0
2	Netherlands	8	6	1	1	24	7	+17	19	Qualify for final tournament	2–3	—	3–1	4–0	5–0
3	Northern Ireland	8	4	1	3	9	13	−4	13	Advance to play-offs via Nations League	0–2	0–0	—	2–1	2–0
4	Belarus	8	1	1	6	4	16	−12	4	Advance to play-offs via Nations League	0–2	1–2	0–1	—	0–0
5	Estonia	8	0	1	7	2	26	−24	1		0–3	0–4	1–2	1–2	—

Source: UEFA
Rules for classification: Qualification tiebreakers

== Matches ==
The fixtures were released by UEFA the same day as the draw, which was held on 2 December 2018 in Dublin, Ireland. Times are CET/CEST, (Note: CET (UTC+1) for matches in March and November 2019, and CEST (UTC+2) for all other matches.) as listed by UEFA (local times, if different, are in parentheses).

21 March 2019
20:45

Netherlands	4–0	Belarus
Depay 1', 55' (pen.); Wijnaldum 21'; Van Dijk 86'	Report

De Kuip, Rotterdam
Attendance: 38,604
Referee: Davide Massa (Italy)
21 March 2019
20:45 (19:45 UTC+0)

Northern Ireland	2–0	Estonia
McGinn 56'; Davis 75' (pen.)	Report

Windsor Park, Belfast
Attendance: 18,176
Referee: Ivan Bebek (Croatia)

24 March 2019
20:45

Netherlands	2–3	Germany
De Ligt 48'; Depay 63'	Report	Sané 15'; Gnabry 34'; Schulz 90'

Johan Cruyff Arena, Amsterdam
Attendance: 51,694
Referee: Jesús Gil Manzano (Spain)
24 March 2019
20:45 (19:45 UTC+0)

Northern Ireland	2–1	Belarus
J. Evans 30'; Magennis 87'	Report	Stasevich 33'

Windsor Park, Belfast
Attendance: 18,188
Referee: Paweł Raczkowski (Poland)

8 June 2019
18:00 (19:00 UTC+3)

Estonia	1–2	Northern Ireland
Vassiljev 25'	Report	Washington 77'; Magennis 80'

Lilleküla Stadium, Tallinn
Attendance: 8,378
Referee: Fabio Verissimo (Portugal)
8 June 2019
20:45 (21:45 UTC+3)

Belarus	0–2	Germany
	Report	Sané 13'; Reus 62'

Borisov Arena, Barysaw
Attendance: 12,510
Referee: Srđan Jovanović (Serbia)

11 June 2019
20:45 (21:45 UTC+3)

Belarus	0–1	Northern Ireland
	Report	McNair 86'

Borisov Arena, Barysaw
Attendance: 5,250
Referee: Harald Lechner (Austria)
11 June 2019
20:45

Germany	8–0	Estonia
Reus 10', 37'; Gnabry 17', 62'; Goretzka 20'; Gündoğan 26' (pen.); Werner 79'; Sané 88'	Report

Opel Arena, Mainz
Attendance: 26,050
Referee: Ali Palabıyık (Turkey)

6 September 2019
18:00 (19:00 UTC+3)

Estonia	1–2	Belarus
Sorga 54'	Report	Naumov 48'; Skavysh 90+2'

Lilleküla Stadium, Tallinn
Attendance: 7,314
Referee: Alain Durieux (Luxembourg)
6 September 2019
20:45

Germany	2–4	Netherlands
Gnabry 9'; Kroos 73' (pen.)	Report	F. de Jong 59'; Tah 66' (o.g.); Malen 79'; Wijnaldum 90+1'

Volksparkstadion, Hamburg
Attendance: 51,299
Referee: Artur Soares Dias (Portugal)

9 September 2019
20:45 (21:45 UTC+3)

Estonia	0–4	Netherlands
	Report	Babel 17', 47'; Depay 76'; Wijnaldum 87'

Lilleküla Stadium, Tallinn
Attendance: 11,006
Referee: Serhiy Boiko (Ukraine)
9 September 2019
20:45 (19:45 UTC+1)

Northern Ireland	0–2	Germany
	Report	Halstenberg 48'; Gnabry 90+3'

Windsor Park, Belfast
Attendance: 18,326
Referee: Daniele Orsato (Italy)

10 October 2019
18:00 (19:00 UTC+3)

Belarus	0–0	Estonia
	Report

Dinamo Stadium, Minsk
Attendance: 11,300
Referee: Ricardo de Burgos Bengoetxea (Spain)
10 October 2019
20:45

Netherlands	3–1	Northern Ireland
Depay 80', 90+4'; L. de Jong 90+1'	Report	Magennis 75'

De Kuip, Rotterdam
Attendance: 41,348
Referee: Benoît Bastien (France)

13 October 2019
18:00 (19:00 UTC+3)

Belarus	1–2	Netherlands
Drahun 54'	Report	Wijnaldum 32', 41'

Dinamo Stadium, Minsk
Attendance: 21,639
Referee: Anastasios Sidiropoulos (Greece)
13 October 2019
20:45 (21:45 UTC+3)

Estonia	0–3	Germany
	Report	Gündoğan 51', 57'; Werner 71'

Lilleküla Stadium, Tallinn
Attendance: 12,062
Referee: Georgi Kabakov (Bulgaria)

16 November 2019
20:45

Germany	4–0	Belarus
Ginter 41'; Goretzka 49'; Kroos 55', 83'	Report

Borussia-Park, Mönchengladbach
Attendance: 33,164
Referee: Orel Grinfeld (Israel)
16 November 2019
20:45 (19:45 UTC+0)

Northern Ireland	0–0	Netherlands
	Report

Windsor Park, Belfast
Attendance: 18,404
Referee: Szymon Marciniak (Poland)

19 November 2019
20:45

Germany	6–1	Northern Ireland
Gnabry 19', 47', 60'; Goretzka 43', 73'; Brandt 90+1'	Report	Smith 7'

Waldstadion, Frankfurt
Attendance: 42,855
Referee: Carlos del Cerro Grande (Spain)
19 November 2019
20:45

Netherlands	5–0	Estonia
Wijnaldum 6', 66', 79'; Aké 19'; Boadu 87'	Report

Johan Cruyff Arena, Amsterdam
Attendance: 50,386
Referee: Davide Massa (Italy)

== Goalscorers ==
There were 69 goals scored in 20 matches, for an average of 3.45 goals per match.

8 goals

- (Germany national football team) Serge Gnabry
- (Netherlands national football team) Georginio Wijnaldum

6 goals

- (Netherlands national football team) Memphis Depay

4 goals

- (Germany national football team) Leon Goretzka

3 goals

- (Germany national football team) İlkay Gündoğan
- (Germany national football team) Toni Kroos
- (Germany national football team) Marco Reus
- (Germany national football team) Leroy Sané
- (Northern Ireland national football team) Josh Magennis

2 goals

- (Germany national football team) Timo Werner
- (Netherlands national football team) Ryan Babel

1 goal

- (Belarus national football team) Stanislaw Drahun
- (Belarus national football team) Nikita Naumov
- (Belarus national football team) Maksim Skavysh
- (Belarus national football team) Ihar Stasevich
- (Estonia national football team) Erik Sorga
- (Estonia national football team) Konstantin Vassiljev
- (Germany national football team) Julian Brandt
- (Germany national football team) Matthias Ginter
- (Germany national football team) Marcel Halstenberg
- (Germany national football team) Nico Schulz
- (Netherlands national football team) Nathan Aké
- (Netherlands national football team) Myron Boadu
- (Netherlands national football team) Virgil van Dijk
- (Netherlands national football team) Frenkie de Jong
- (Netherlands national football team) Luuk de Jong
- (Netherlands national football team) Matthijs de Ligt
- (Netherlands national football team) Donyell Malen
- (Northern Ireland national football team) Steven Davis
- (Northern Ireland national football team) Jonny Evans
- (Northern Ireland national football team) Niall McGinn
- (Northern Ireland national football team) Paddy McNair
- (Northern Ireland national football team) Michael Smith
- (Northern Ireland national football team) Conor Washington

1 own goal

- (Germany national football team) Jonathan Tah (against Netherlands)

== Discipline ==
A player was automatically suspended for the next match for the following offences:

- Receiving a red card (red card suspensions could be extended for serious offences)
- Receiving three yellow cards in three different matches, as well as after fifth and any subsequent yellow card (yellow card suspensions were not carried forward to the play-offs, the finals or any other future international matches)

The following suspensions were served during the qualifying matches:

Team	Player	Offence(s)	Suspended for match(es)
Estonia	Joonas Tamm	(yellow card) vs Northern Ireland (21 March 2019); (yellow card) vs Germany (11 June 2019); (yellow card) vs Netherlands (9 September 2019)	vs Belarus (10 October 2019)
Germany	Emre Can	(red card) vs Estonia (13 October 2019)	vs Belarus (16 November 2019)
Netherlands	Marten de Roon	(yellow card) vs Belarus (21 March 2019); (yellow card) vs Germany (6 September 2019); (yellow card) vs Northern Ireland (16 November 2019)	vs Estonia (19 November 2019)
