= Cees Heerschop =

Dutch footballer (1935–2014)

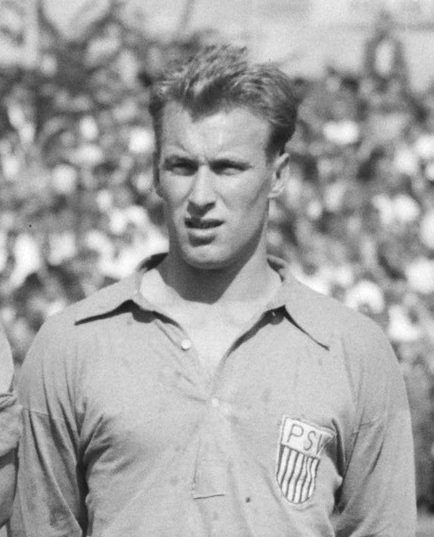

Personal information
- Date of birth: 14 February 1935
- Place of birth: Hilversum, Netherlands
- Date of death: 24 July 2014 (aged 79)
- Place of death: Eindhoven, Netherlands
- Position: Right back

Youth career
- HV & AV Donar

Senior career*
Years	Team	Apps	(Gls)
1956–1964	PSV	191	(1)
1964–1965	NEC	10	(1)
Total		201	(2)
- * Club domestic league appearances and goals

Cees Heerschop (14 February 1935 – 24 July 2014) was a Dutch footballer who played for PSV as a right back, making 191 appearances for the club in all competitions, between 1956 and 1964. He won the 1962-63 Eredivisie title with the club and he later spent a year with NEC.

Born in Hilversum and known as a tough-tackling defender, Heerschop played almost 200 matches for PSV alongside players including Pim Bekkering, Fons van Wissen, Toon Brusselers and Pierre Kerkhoffs.
