= Bořek Dočkal =

Czech footballer (born 1988)

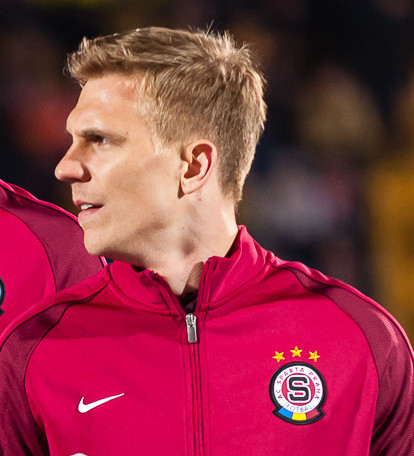
- Bořek Dočkal with Sparta in 2017

Personal information
- Full name: Bořek Dočkal
- Date of birth: 30 September 1988 (age 38)
- Place of birth: Městec Králové, Czechoslovakia
- Height: 1.82 m (6 ft 0 in)
- Position: Midfielder

Youth career
- 1995–1998: TJ Bohemia Poděbrady
- 1998–2006: Slavia Prague

Senior career*
Years	Team	Apps	(Gls)
2006–2008	Slavia Prague	6	(1)
2006–2007	→ SK Kladno (loan)	14	(2)
2008–2011	Slovan Liberec	84	(13)
2010–2011	→ Konyaspor (loan)	9	(0)
2011–2013	Rosenborg	55	(14)
2013–2017	Sparta Prague	95	(24)
2017–2018	Henan Jianye	23	(4)
2018	→ Philadelphia Union (loan)	32	(5)
2019–2022	Sparta Prague	76	(6)
Total		393	(69)

International career^{‡}
2003	Czech Republic U16	2	(0)
2004–2005	Czech Republic U17	8	(0)
2006–2007	Czech Republic U19	10	(2)
2007–2011	Czech Republic U21	17	(6)
2012–2022	Czech Republic	40	(7)
- * Club domestic league appearances and goals as of 18 May 2022 ‡ National team caps and goals as of 20 November 2018

Bořek Dočkal (born 30 September 1988) is a Czech former professional footballer who played as a midfielder and captained Sparta Prague. Outside of his native Czech Republic, he played club football in Turkey, Norway, China, and the United States. Dočkal represented Czech Republic at international level, serving as captain at both youth and senior levels.

== Club career ==
=== Early career ===
Dočkal began his football career in Poděbrady and moved to Slavia Prague at the age of 10. He went through all the youth teams of Slavia and made his first team debut against SK Kladno. Dočkal scored his first goal for Slavia in his third match against FK Teplice and was sent on a loan to Czech First League side Slovan Liberec in winter 2008, where he signed a contract several months later. Dočkal went on a year loan to Turkish Super League side Konyaspor in July 2010.

=== Rosenborg ===
In August 2011, Dočkal signed a long-term contract with Norwegian side Rosenborg. He contributed with one assist in his first game, where Rosenborg won 3–1 against rivals Molde. During the 2012–13 UEFA Europa League, Dočkal scored 7 goals in 12 matches (6 goals in 7 games over the course of the preliminary stages), including a dramatic injury-time goal against Kazakh club FC Ordabasy on 26 July 2012, to propel nine-man Rosenborg to a 4–3 aggregate victory. After two years with Rosenborg, during which Dočkal scored 14 goals in 55 league matches, he returned to the Czech Republic in August 2013, signing a three-year contract with Sparta Prague.

=== Henan Jianye ===
In February 2017, Dočkal secured a transfer from Sparta Prague to Chinese Super League club Henan Jianye. The transfer was reported in the range of €8.5 million, among the highest recorded for the Czech top division. Dočkal made 23 starts and scored four goals during the 2017 season.

==== Loan to Philadelphia Union ====
In February 2018, Dočkal signed a loan move with the Philadelphia Union in Major League Soccer as the team's third designated player. After a few matches with his new team, Dočkal's first goal was a game-winner for the Union against D.C. United. Dočkal proved to be successful in Philadelphia, earning the Union's most valuable player for the season and setting the record for most assists for a season, and lead Major League Soccer in assists for the 2018 season.

=== Return to Sparta Prague ===
In February 2019, Dočkal returned to Sparta Prague. He announced his retirement from professional football in May 2022.

== International career ==
Dočkal was the captain of the Czech U-21 team. He represented the team at the 2011 UEFA European Under-21 Football Championship.

Dočkal debuted for the Czech senior squad against Slovakia in November 2012. With the introduction of 2018–19 UEFA Nations League, he became captain and made two assists in another match against Slovakia.

== Career statistics ==
=== Club ===
As of match played 18 May 2022

Appearances and goals by club, season and competition
Club	Season	League	League		Cup		Continental		Total	
Club	Season	League	Apps	Goals	Apps	Goals	Apps	Goals	Apps	Goals
Slavia Prague	2006–07	Czech First League	6	1	0	0	–		6	1
SK Kladno (loan)	2007–08	Czech First League	14	2	0	0	–		14	2
Slovan Liberec	2007–08	Czech First League	14	1	0	0	–		14	1
Slovan Liberec	2008–09	Czech First League	27	5	0	0	2	0	29	5
Slovan Liberec	2009–10	Czech First League	29	5	0	0	4	0	33	5
Slovan Liberec	2010–11	Czech First League	13	2	0	0	–		13	2
Slovan Liberec	2011–12	Czech First League	1	0	0	0	–		1	0
Slovan Liberec	Total		84	13	0	0	6	0	90	13
Konyaspor (loan)	2010–11	Süper Lig	9	0	0	0	–		9	0
Rosenborg	2011	Tippeligaen	13	2	1	0	2	0	16	2
Rosenborg	2012	Tippeligaen	27	10	4	6	12	7	43	23
Rosenborg	2013	Tippeligaen	15	2	2	2	4	1	21	5
Rosenborg	Total		55	14	7	8	18	8	80	30
Sparta Prague	2013–14	Czech First League	25	3	8	1	–		33	4
Sparta Prague	2014–15	Czech First League	29	10	4	1	12	1	45	12
Sparta Prague	2015–16	Czech First League	29	8	2	0	16	5	47	13
Sparta Prague	2016–17	Czech First League	11	4	1	0	6	1	18	5
Sparta Prague	Total		94	25	15	2	34	7	143	34
Henan Jianye	2017	Chinese Super League	23	4	0	0	–		23	4
Philadelphia Union (loan)	2018	Major League Soccer	32	5	4	0	–		36	5
Sparta Prague	2018–19	Czech First League	3	0	0	0	–		3	0
Sparta Prague	2019–20	Czech First League	13	1	3	0	–		16	1
Sparta Prague	2020–21	Czech First League	33	4	2	0	5	1	40	5
Sparta Prague	2021–22	Czech First League	27	1	3	1	9	0	39	2
Sparta Prague	Total		76	6	8	1	14	1	98	8
Career total			393	69	34	11	72	16	499	96

=== International goals ===
Scores and results list Czech Republic's goal tally first, score column indicates score after each Dočkal goal.

List of international goals scored by Bořek Dočkal
No.	Date	Venue	Opponent	Score	Result	Competition
1	14 November 2012	Andrův stadion, Olomouc	Slovakia	3–0	3–0	Friendly
2	15 October 2013	Vasil Levski National Stadium, Sofia	Bulgaria	1–0	1–0	2014 World Cup qualifier
3	9 September 2014	Generali Arena, Prague	Netherlands	1–0	2–1	UEFA Euro 2016 qualifier
4	10 October 2014	Şükrü Saracoğlu Stadium, Istanbul	Turkey	2–1	2–1	UEFA Euro 2016 qualifier
5	13 October 2014	Astana Arena, Astana	Kazakhstan	1–0	4–2	UEFA Euro 2016 qualifier
6	12 June 2015	Laugardalsvöllur stadium, Reykjavík	Iceland	1–0	1–2	UEFA Euro 2016 qualifier
7	4 September 2020	Tehelné pole, Bratislava	Slovakia	2–0	3–1	2020–21 UEFA Nations League B

== Honours ==
=== Individual ===
- MLS top assist provider: 2018
