= UEFA Euro 2016 qualifying Group A =

Football tournament qualifying stage

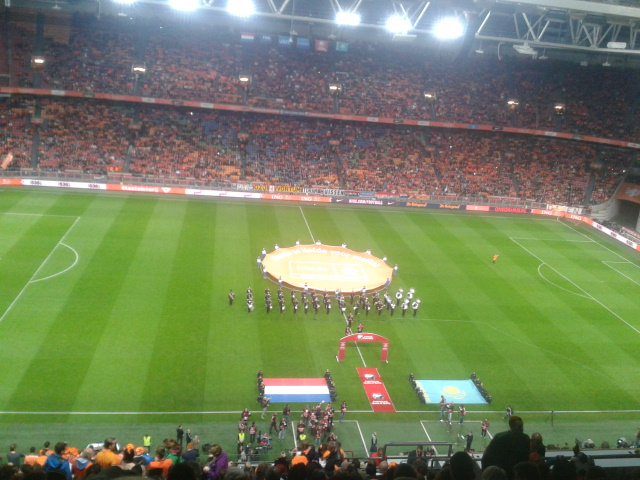
Line-up of the Netherlands–Kazakhstan teams prior to the match

The UEFA Euro 2016 qualifying Group A was one of the nine groups to decide which teams would qualify for the UEFA Euro 2016 finals tournament. Group A consisted of six teams: Netherlands, Czech Republic, Turkey, Latvia, Iceland, and Kazakhstan, where they played against each other home-and-away in a round-robin format.

The top two teams, the Czech Republic and Iceland, qualified directly for the finals. Turkey's win over Iceland, combined with Kazakhstan's win over Latvia on the final day of matches, also allowed Turkey to qualify directly as the best ranked third-placed team of the qualifiers. As Turkey earned 6 points against Kazakhstan and 2 points against Latvia through their home and away fixtures, and as Kazakhstan's win over Latvia ensured that Latvia finished in last place in the group based on head-to-head record, not Kazakhstan, it then meant that only 2, not 6, of Turkey's total of 18 points earned would not count towards their third-placed ranking (as results against the team finishing in last place in the group were not included when ranking third-placed teams because one group had fewer teams than the others).

== Standings ==
Pos	Team	Pld	W	D	L	GF	GA	GD	Pts	Qualification	(Czech Republic)	(Iceland)	(Turkey)	(Netherlands)	(Kazakhstan)	(Latvia)
1	Czech Republic	10	7	1	2	19	14	+5	22	Qualify for final tournament	—	2–1	0–2	2–1	2–1	1–1
2	Iceland	10	6	2	2	17	6	+11	20	Qualify for final tournament	2–1	—	3–0	2–0	0–0	2–2
3	Turkey	10	5	3	2	14	9	+5	18	Qualify for final tournament	1–2	1–0	—	3–0	3–1	1–1
4	Netherlands	10	4	1	5	17	14	+3	13		2–3	0–1	1–1	—	3–1	6–0
5	Kazakhstan	10	1	2	7	7	18	−11	5 (Note: Head-to-head points: Kazakhstan 4, Latvia 1.)		2–4	0–3	0–1	1–2	—	0–0
6	Latvia	10	0	5	5	6	19	−13	5		1–2	0–3	1–1	0–2	0–1	—

Source: UEFA
Rules for classification: Qualification tiebreakers

== Matches ==
The fixtures were released by UEFA the same day as the draw, which was held on 23 February 2014 in Nice. Times are CET/CEST, (Note: CET (UTC+1) for matches on 16 November 2014 and 28 March 2015, and CEST (UTC+2) for all other matches.) as listed by UEFA (local times are in parentheses).

9 September 2014
18:00
(22:00 UTC+6)

Kazakhstan	0–0	Latvia
	Report

Astana Arena, Astana
Attendance: 10,200
Referee: Ivan Kružliak (Slovakia)
9 September 2014
20:45
(20:45 UTC+2)

Czech Republic	2–1	Netherlands
Dočkal 22'; Pilař 90+1'	Report	De Vrij 55'

Generali Arena, Prague
Attendance: 17,946
Referee: Gianluca Rocchi (Italy)
9 September 2014
20:45
(18:45 UTC±0)

Iceland	3–0	Turkey
Böðvarsson 19'; G. Sigurðsson 76'; Sigþórsson 77'	Report

Laugardalsvöllur, Reykjavík
Attendance: 8,811
Referee: Ivan Bebek (Croatia)

10 October 2014
20:45
(21:45 UTC+3)

Latvia	0–3	Iceland
	Report	G. Sigurðsson 66'; Gunnarsson 77'; Gíslason 90'

Skonto Stadium, Riga
Attendance: 6,354
Referee: Robert Schörgenhofer (Austria)
10 October 2014
20:45
(20:45 UTC+2)

Netherlands	3–1	Kazakhstan
Huntelaar 62'; Afellay 82'; Van Persie 89' (pen.)	Report	Abdulin 17'

Amsterdam Arena, Amsterdam
Attendance: 47,500
Referee: Matej Jug (Slovenia)
10 October 2014
20:45
(21:45 UTC+3)

Turkey	1–2	Czech Republic
Bulut 8'	Report	Sivok 15'; Dočkal 58'

Şükrü Saracoğlu Stadium, Istanbul
Attendance: 24,007
Referee: Jonas Eriksson (Sweden)

13 October 2014
18:00
(22:00 UTC+6)

Kazakhstan	2–4	Czech Republic
Logvinenko 84', 90+1'	Report	Dočkal 13'; Lafata 44'; Krejčí 56'; Necid 88'

Astana Arena, Astana
Attendance: 13,752
Referee: Mattias Gestranius (Finland)
13 October 2014
20:45
(18:45 UTC±0)

Iceland	2–0	Netherlands
G. Sigurðsson 10' (pen.), 42'	Report

Laugardalsvöllur, Reykjavík
Attendance: 9,760
Referee: Carlos Velasco Carballo (Spain)
13 October 2014
20:45
(21:45 UTC+3)

Latvia	1–1	Turkey
Šabala 54' (pen.)	Report	Kısa 47'

Skonto Stadium, Riga
Attendance: 6,442
Referee: Bobby Madden (Scotland)

16 November 2014
18:00
(18:00 UTC+1)

Netherlands	6–0	Latvia
Van Persie 6'; Robben 35', 82'; Huntelaar 42', 89'; Bruma 78'	Report

Amsterdam Arena, Amsterdam
Attendance: 47,500
Referee: Liran Liany (Israel)
16 November 2014
20:45
(20:45 UTC+1)

Czech Republic	2–1	Iceland
Kadeřábek 45+1'; Böðvarsson 61' (o.g.)	Report	R. Sigurðsson 9'

Doosan Arena, Plzeň
Attendance: 11,533
Referee: Wolfgang Stark (Germany)
16 November 2014
20:45
(21:45 UTC+2)

Turkey	3–1	Kazakhstan
Yılmaz 26' (pen.), 29'; Aziz 83'	Report	Smakov 87' (pen.)

Türk Telekom Arena, Istanbul
Attendance: 27,549
Referee: Aleksei Eskov (Russia)

28 March 2015
16:00
(21:00 UTC+6)

Kazakhstan	0–3	Iceland
	Report	Guðjohnsen 20'; B. Bjarnason 32', 90+1'

Astana Arena, Astana
Attendance: 13,182
Referee: Anastasios Sidiropoulos (Greece)
28 March 2015
18:00
(18:00 UTC+1)

Czech Republic	1–1	Latvia
Pilař 90'	Report	A. Višņakovs 30'

Eden Arena, Prague
Attendance: 13,722
Referee: Javier Estrada Fernández (Spain)
28 March 2015
20:45
(20:45 UTC+1)

Netherlands	1–1	Turkey
Huntelaar 90+2'	Report	Yılmaz 37'

Amsterdam Arena, Amsterdam
Attendance: 49,500
Referee: Felix Brych (Germany)

12 June 2015
18:00
(22:00 UTC+6)

Kazakhstan	0–1	Turkey
	Report	Turan 83'

Central Stadium, Almaty
Attendance: 25,125
Referee: Michael Oliver (England)
12 June 2015
20:45
(18:45 UTC±0)

Iceland	2–1	Czech Republic
Gunnarsson 60'; Sigþórsson 76'	Report	Dočkal 55'

Laugardalsvöllur, Reykjavík
Attendance: 9,767
Referee: William Collum (Scotland)
12 June 2015
20:45
(21:45 UTC+3)

Latvia	0–2	Netherlands
	Report	Wijnaldum 67'; Narsingh 71'

Skonto Stadium, Riga
Attendance: 8,067
Referee: Svein Oddvar Moen (Norway)

3 September 2015
20:45
(20:45 UTC+2)

Czech Republic	2–1	Kazakhstan
Škoda 74', 86'	Report	Logvinenko 21'

Doosan Arena, Plzeň
Attendance: 10,572
Referee: Martin Strömbergsson (Sweden)
3 September 2015
20:45
(20:45 UTC+2)

Netherlands	0–1	Iceland
	Report	G. Sigurðsson 51' (pen.)

Amsterdam Arena, Amsterdam
Attendance: 50,275
Referee: Milorad Mažić (Serbia)
3 September 2015
20:45
(21:45 UTC+3)

Turkey	1–1	Latvia
İnan 77'	Report	Šabala 90+1'

Torku Arena, Konya
Attendance: 35,900
Referee: Stefan Johannesson (Sweden)

6 September 2015
18:00
(19:00 UTC+3)

Latvia	1–2	Czech Republic
Zjuzins 73'	Report	Limberský 13'; Darida 25'

Skonto Stadium, Riga
Attendance: 7,913
Referee: Deniz Aytekin (Germany)
6 September 2015
18:00
(19:00 UTC+3)

Turkey	3–0	Netherlands
Özyakup 8'; Turan 26'; Yılmaz 86'	Report

Torku Arena, Konya
Attendance: 41,007
Referee: Antonio Mateu Lahoz (Spain)
6 September 2015
20:45
(18:45 UTC±0)

Iceland	0–0	Kazakhstan
	Report

Laugardalsvöllur, Reykjavík
Attendance: 9,767
Referee: Yevhen Aranovsky (Ukraine)

10 October 2015
18:00
(16:00 UTC±0)

Iceland	2–2	Latvia
Sigþórsson 5'; G. Sigurðsson 27'	Report	Cauņa 49'; Šabala 68'

Laugardalsvöllur, Reykjavík
Attendance: 9,767
Referee: Aleksei Eskov (Russia)
10 October 2015
18:00
(22:00 UTC+6)

Kazakhstan	1–2	Netherlands
Kuat 90+6'	Report	Wijnaldum 33'; Sneijder 50'

Astana Arena, Astana
Attendance: 20,716
Referee: Clément Turpin (France)
10 October 2015
20:45
(20:45 UTC+2)

Czech Republic	0–2	Turkey
	Report	İnan 62' (pen.); Çalhanoğlu 79'

Generali Arena, Prague
Attendance: 17,190
Referee: Martin Atkinson (England)

13 October 2015
20:45
(21:45 UTC+3)

Latvia	0–1	Kazakhstan
	Report	Kuat 65'

Skonto Stadium, Riga
Attendance: 7,027
Referee: Steven McLean (Scotland)
13 October 2015
20:45
(20:45 UTC+2)

Netherlands	2–3	Czech Republic
Huntelaar 70'; Van Persie 83'	Report	Kadeřábek 24'; Šural 35'; Van Persie 66' (o.g.)

Amsterdam Arena, Amsterdam
Attendance: 48,000
Referee: Damir Skomina (Slovenia)
13 October 2015
20:45
(21:45 UTC+3)

Turkey	1–0	Iceland
İnan 89'	Report

Torku Arena, Konya
Attendance: 39,404
Referee: Gianluca Rocchi (Italy)

== Goalscorers ==
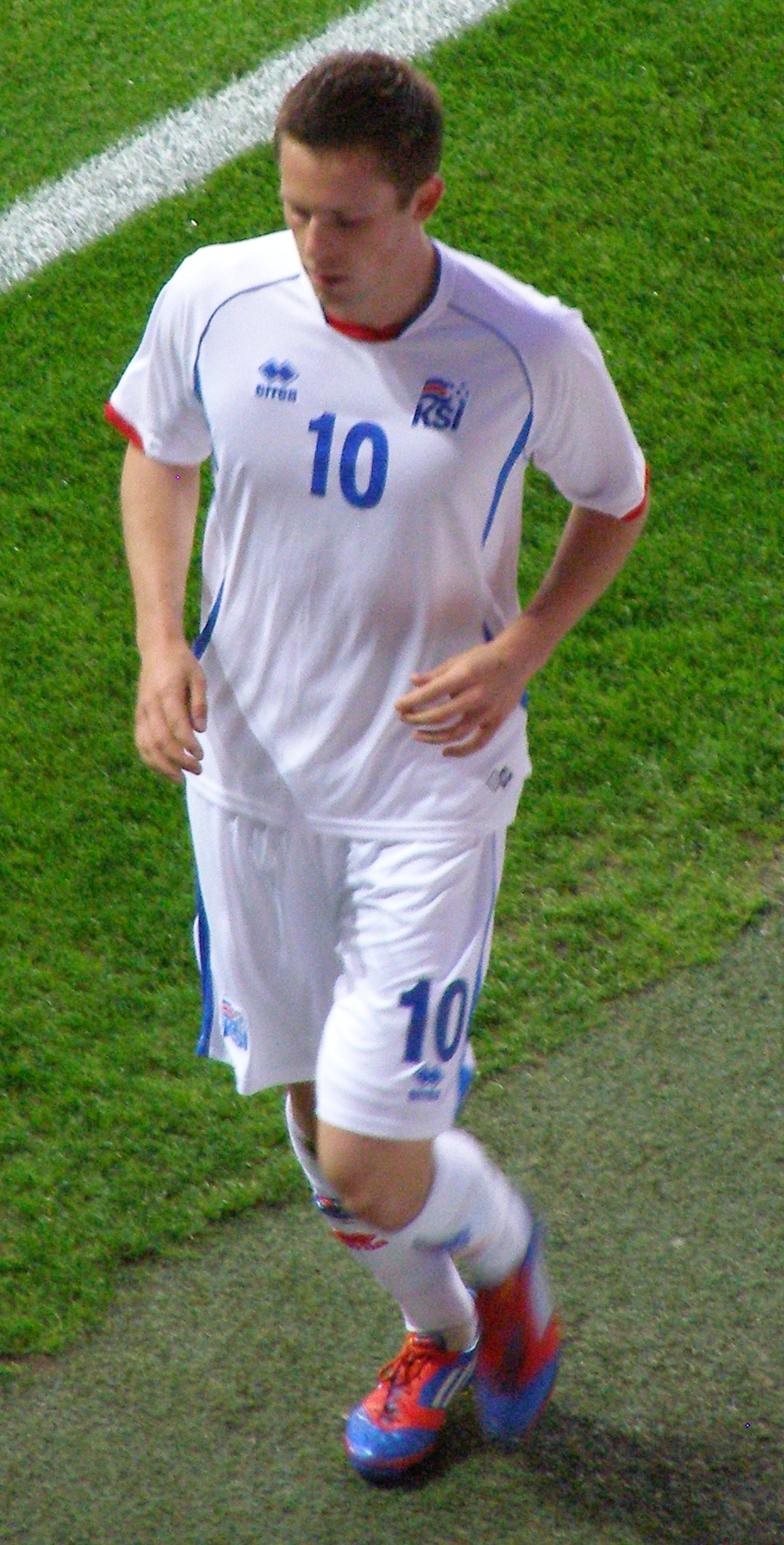
Iceland's Gylfi Sigurðsson was the group's top scorer, with six goals

There were 80 goals scored in 30 matches, for an average of 2.67 goals per match.

6 goals

- (Iceland national football team) Gylfi Sigurðsson

5 goals

- (Netherlands national football team) Klaas-Jan Huntelaar

4 goals

- (Czech Republic national football team) Bořek Dočkal
- (Turkey national football team) Burak Yılmaz

3 goals

- (Iceland national football team) Kolbeinn Sigþórsson
- (Kazakhstan national football team) Yuriy Logvinenko
- (Latvia national football team) Valērijs Šabala
- (Netherlands national football team) Robin van Persie
- (Turkey national football team) Selçuk İnan

2 goals

- (Czech Republic national football team) Pavel Kadeřábek
- (Czech Republic national football team) Václav Pilař
- (Czech Republic national football team) Milan Škoda
- (Iceland national football team) Birkir Bjarnason
- (Iceland national football team) Aron Gunnarsson
- (Kazakhstan national football team) Islambek Kuat
- (Netherlands national football team) Arjen Robben
- (Netherlands national football team) Georginio Wijnaldum
- (Turkey national football team) Arda Turan

1 goal

- (Czech Republic national football team) Vladimír Darida
- (Czech Republic national football team) Ladislav Krejčí
- (Czech Republic national football team) David Lafata
- (Czech Republic national football team) David Limberský
- (Czech Republic national football team) Tomáš Necid
- (Czech Republic national football team) Tomáš Sivok
- (Czech Republic national football team) Josef Šural
- (Iceland national football team) Jón Daði Böðvarsson
- (Iceland national football team) Rúrik Gíslason
- (Iceland national football team) Eiður Guðjohnsen
- (Iceland national football team) Ragnar Sigurðsson
- (Kazakhstan national football team) Rinat Abdulin
- (Kazakhstan national football team) Samat Smakov
- (Latvia national football team) Aleksandrs Cauņa
- (Latvia national football team) Aleksejs Višņakovs
- (Latvia national football team) Artūrs Zjuzins
- (Netherlands national football team) Ibrahim Afellay
- (Netherlands national football team) Jeffrey Bruma
- (Netherlands national football team) Stefan de Vrij
- (Netherlands national football team) Luciano Narsingh
- (Netherlands national football team) Wesley Sneijder
- (Turkey national football team) Serdar Aziz
- (Turkey national football team) Umut Bulut
- (Turkey national football team) Hakan Çalhanoğlu
- (Turkey national football team) Bilal Kısa
- (Turkey national football team) Oğuzhan Özyakup

1 own goal

- (Iceland national football team) Jón Daði Böðvarsson (against Czech Republic)
- (Netherlands national football team) Robin van Persie (against Czech Republic)

== Discipline ==
A player was automatically suspended for the next match for the following offences:

- Receiving a red card (red card suspensions could be extended for serious offences)
- Receiving three yellow cards in three different matches, as well as after the fifth and any subsequent yellow card (yellow card suspensions were carried forward to the playoffs, but not the finals or any other future international matches)

The following suspensions were served during the qualifying matches:

Team	Player	Offence(s)	Suspended for match(es)
Czech Republic	Bořek Dočkal	(yellow card) vs Iceland (16 November 2014); (yellow card) vs Latvia (28 March 2015); (yellow card) vs Turkey (10 October 2015)	vs Netherlands (13 October 2015)
Iceland	Aron Gunnarsson	(yellow card) (yellow-red card) vs Kazakhstan (6 September 2015)	vs Latvia (10 October 2015)
Kazakhstan	Bauyrzhan Dzholchiyev	(red card) vs Netherlands (10 October 2014)	vs Czech Republic (13 October 2014) vs Turkey (16 November 2014) vs Iceland (28 March 2015)
Kazakhstan	Dmitri Shomko	(yellow card) vs Netherlands (10 October 2014); (yellow card) vs Turkey (12 June 2015); (yellow card) vs Czech Republic (3 September 2015)	vs Iceland (6 September 2015)
Latvia	Artjoms Rudņevs	(yellow card) (yellow-red card) vs Iceland (10 October 2014)	vs Turkey (13 October 2014)
Latvia	Gints Freimanis	(yellow card) (yellow-red card) vs Turkey (13 October 2014)	vs Netherlands (16 November 2014)
Netherlands	Bruno Martins Indi	(red card) vs Iceland (3 September 2015)	vs Turkey (6 September 2015) vs Kazakhstan (10 October 2015)
Netherlands	Gregory van der Wiel	(yellow card) vs Turkey (28 March 2015); (yellow card) vs Iceland (3 September 2015); (yellow card) vs Turkey (6 September 2015)	vs Kazakhstan (10 October 2015)
Turkey	Ömer Toprak	(yellow card) (yellow-red card) vs Iceland (9 September 2014)	vs Czech Republic (10 October 2014)
Turkey	Arda Turan	(yellow card) vs Iceland (9 September 2014); (yellow card) vs Latvia (13 October 2014); (yellow card) vs Kazakhstan (16 November 2014)	vs Netherlands (28 March 2015)
