= Georginio Wijnaldum =

Dutch footballer (born 1990)

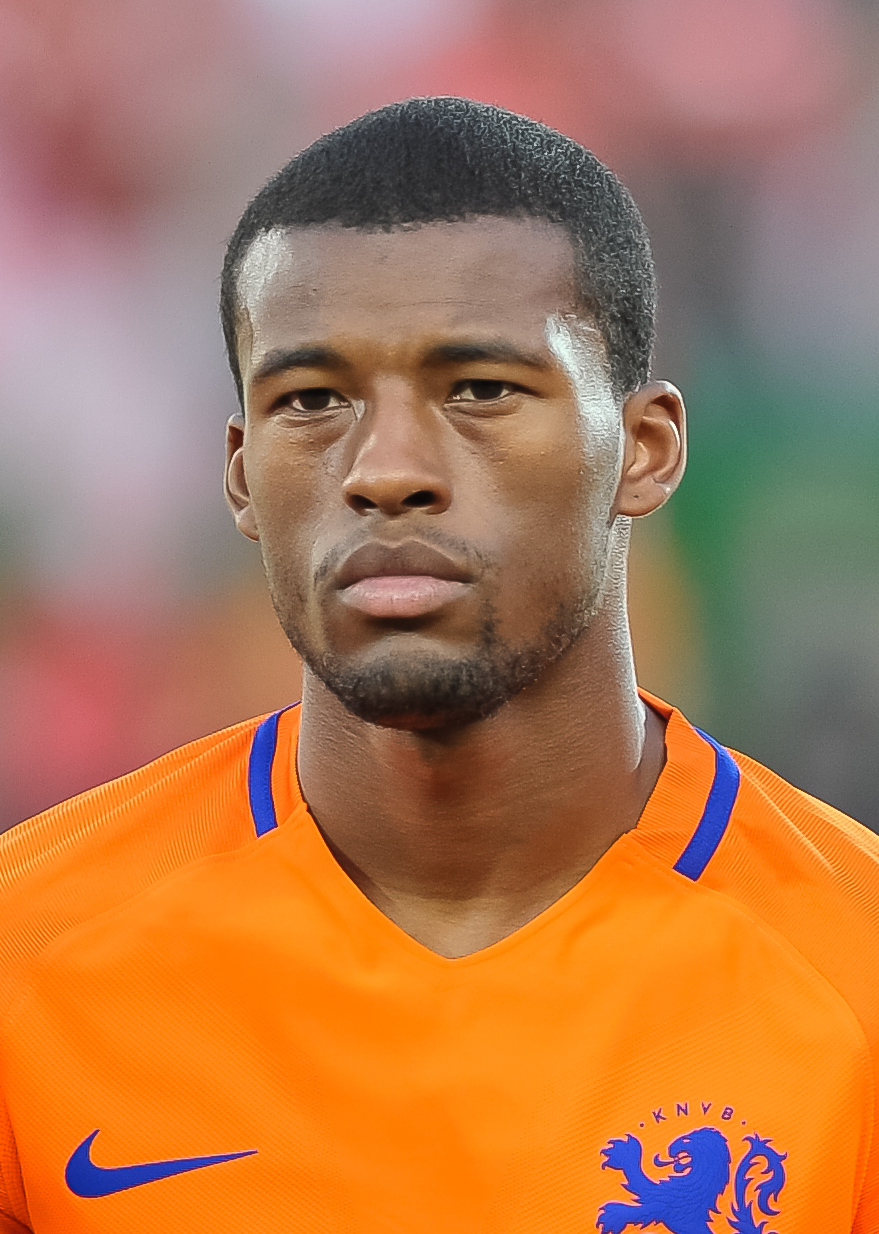
- Wijnaldum with the Netherlands in 2016

Personal information
- Full name: Georginio Gregion Emile Wijnaldum
- Date of birth: 11 November 1990 (age 36)
- Place of birth: Rotterdam, Netherlands
- Height: 1.73 m (5 ft 8 in)
- Position: Midfielder

Team information
- Current team: Al-Ittihad
- Number: 23

Youth career
- 1997–2004: Sparta Rotterdam
- 2004–2007: Feyenoord

Senior career*
Years	Team	Apps	(Gls)
2007–2011	Feyenoord	111	(23)
2011–2015	PSV	109	(40)
2015–2016	Newcastle United	38	(11)
2016–2021	Liverpool	179	(16)
2021–2023	Paris Saint-Germain	31	(1)
2022–2023	→ Roma (loan)	14	(2)
2023–2026	Al-Ettifaq	96	(36)
2026–	Al-Ittihad	5	(1)

International career
2005–2007	Netherlands U17	15	(4)
2007–2009	Netherlands U19	17	(5)
2009–2013	Netherlands U21	24	(10)
2011–2024	Netherlands	96	(28)
Medal record
Representing Netherlands
FIFA World Cup
Bronze medal – third place	2014 Brazil	Team
UEFA European Championship
Bronze medal – third place	2024 Germany	Team
UEFA Nations League
Runner-up	2019 Portugal	Team
- * Club domestic league appearances and goals as of 19:43, 30 October 2026 (UTC)

Georginio Gregion Emile Wijnaldum (born Georginio Gregion Emile Boateng; pronounced [dʑoːrˈdʑiɲoː ʋɛiˈnɑldʏm]; 11 November 1990) is a Dutch professional footballer who plays as a midfielder for Saudi Pro League club Al-Ittihad.

A youth product of Eredivisie side Feyenoord, Wijnaldum became the youngest player ever to represent the club when he made his debut in 2007, and went on to play 134 matches over the course of a five-year spell, winning the KNVB Cup in 2008. Following his departure from Feyenoord, Wijnaldum spent four seasons at PSV, where he won the KNVB Cup in his first season and the Eredivisie in his last, a season where he also earned the Dutch Footballer of the Year award.

In 2015, Wijnaldum joined Premier League side Newcastle United for £14.5 million, before departing a year later to join fellow club Liverpool in a £23 million deal. At Liverpool, Wijnaldum took on a role deeper in the midfield than in his previous clubs. In the 2018–19 season, Wijnaldum scored twice against Barcelona in the Champions League semi-final second leg comeback as Liverpool went through 4–3 on aggregate, and he started as the club were victorious in the 2019 UEFA Champions League final. In the following season, he played an integral role as Liverpool won the UEFA Super Cup, FIFA Club World Cup and Premier League, the club's first league title in 30 years. Wijnaldum appeared 237 times for Liverpool and is often regarded as a club legend who played a major part in Liverpool's successes over his six years at the club. Wijnaldum signed for French club Paris Saint-Germain (PSG) in 2021 on a free transfer, spending a loan stint at Italy with Roma for the 2022–23 season. In 2023, he signed for Saudi Arabian side Al-Ettifaq.

Wijnaldum is a former Dutch youth and senior international, having earned over 90 caps since making his debut for the Netherlands national team in 2011, and was a member of the squads which finished third at the 2014 FIFA World Cup and runners-up in the 2018–19 UEFA Nations League. He also took part at the 2020 and 2024 editions of the UEFA European Championship.

== Early and personal life ==
Wijnaldum was born and raised in Rotterdam, South Holland. When he was six years old, his parents, who are both of Surinamese descent, went through a divorce resulting in his mother moving to Amsterdam. However, Wijnaldum stayed in Rotterdam and moved in with his grandmother, where he lived for the remainder of his childhood.

In Wijnaldum's younger years, he never showed interest in football. He never played with a ball or watched football on TV. His ambition was to become a gymnast or acrobat. This changed when Wijnaldum's cousin asked him to come to Sparta Rotterdam's opening day with him; then he was invited to the Sparta Rotterdam youth academy and his love for football started to grow slowly.

Wijnaldum has two younger brothers, one of whom, Giliano Wijnaldum, most recently played for Sparta Rotterdam, as well as a half-brother, Rajiv van La Parra, who most recently played for Apollon Smyrnis. His cousin, Royston Drenthe, was another Feyenoord academy product who most notably played for Real Madrid.

Wijnaldum was formerly known as Georginio Boateng, but following his mother's divorce, he took her maiden name (Wijnaldum).

== Club career ==
=== Early career ===
At age six, Wijnaldum developed himself rapidly at Sparta Rotterdam, winning two championship titles in his first two seasons. Soon Ajax, PSV and Feyenoord showed interest in the youngster, but Wijnaldum declined all offers: "I didn't watch football on TV and I didn't know any of the first team players of Sparta or any of the top clubs. I only knew the real famous players of Oranje, so the offers didn't impress me much. I had a good time at Sparta, I wanted to stay." After playing for Sparta Rotterdam for seven seasons and representing the Netherlands at various youth levels, Wijnaldum decided to accept a new Feyenoord offer. He was convinced playing for Feyenoord was better for his development as a football player and believed in Feyenoord's vision.

At Feyenoord, Wijnaldum joined a successful generation with the likes of Leroy Fer and Luís Pedro. Wijnaldum stood out as an exceptional talent. In January 2007, a few weeks after turning 16, Wijnaldum was invited to the first team's training camp in Belek, Turkey, by Feyenoord manager Erwin Koeman.

=== Feyenoord ===
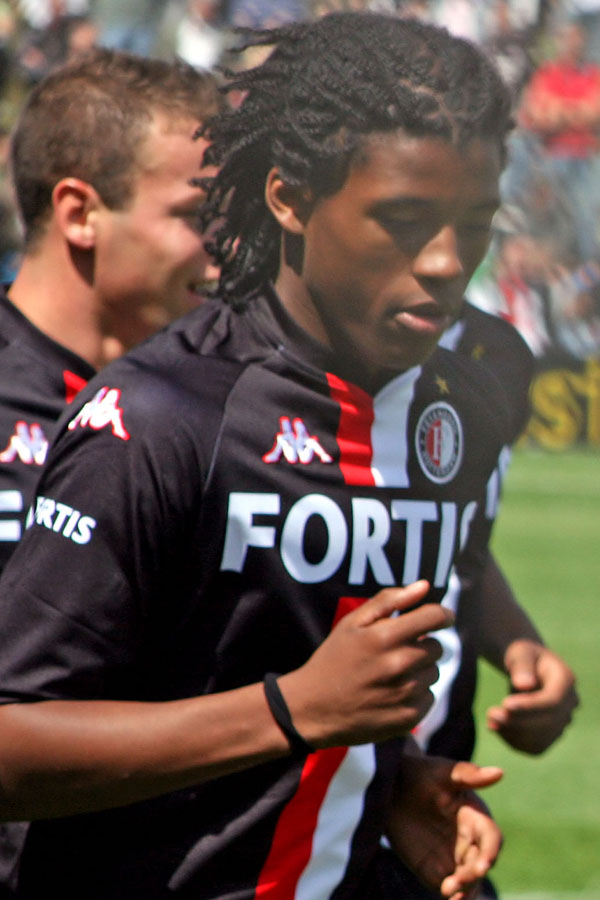
Wijnaldum playing for Feyenoord in 2007

On 8 April 2007, Wijnaldum made his official debut in Feyenoord's starting line-up in the 4–0 Eredivisie home defeat to Groningen. At the age of 16 and 148 days, Wijnaldum became the youngest player ever to play in Feyenoord's first team and was chosen Feyenoord's man of the match. On 2 December 2007, Wijnaldum scored his first Eredivisie goal for Feyenoord, against Heracles Almelo in a 6–0 home win.

In the 2008–09 season, Wijnaldum made his official European debut. On 18 September 2008, he was named in the starting line-up in the 1–0 UEFA Cup home loss to Kalmar FF. On 2 October 2008, he scored his first European goal for Feyenoord in the return match over Kalmar FF, which resulted in a 1–2 win and a place in the competition's group stage.

On 6 March 2009, Wijnaldum signed a new contract at Feyenoord which would have kept him at De Kuip until summer 2012. On 27 February 2011, he helped his struggling Feyenoord to a 5–1 demolition of Groningen, scoring four goals. He scored two goals from open play in the first half and two more from the penalty spot to add his total for the season to eight goals.

=== PSV ===
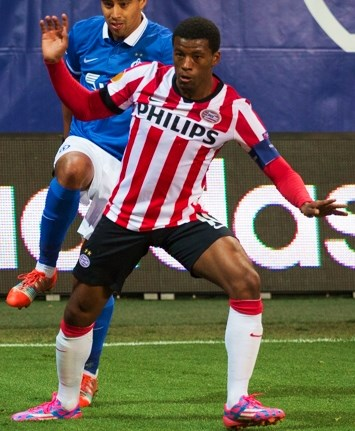
Wijnaldum playing for PSV in 2014

On 29 June 2011, the technical director of Feyenoord announced the club had reached a transfer deal for Wijnaldum reported to be worth €5 million with PSV. On the opening day of the 2011–12 Eredivisie season, Wijnaldum made his debut for PSV in a 3–1 loss against AZ. On 21 August 2011, Wijnaldum scored his first goal for PSV in a 3–0 victory against ADO Den Haag. Since joining the club, Wijnaldum established himself in the starting 11 as he scored goals and developed assists from his attacking role in midfield in Eredivisie, the KNVB Cup and the UEFA Europa League. After the retirement of Mark van Bommel and the departure of Kevin Strootman in the summer of 2013, Wijnaldum was named PSV's captain for the 2013–14 Eredivisie season. However, he played just 11 matches that year, scoring four goals, due to a back injury. For the 2014–15 Eredivisie season, Wijnaldum returned to full fitness and captained PSV to their first Eredivisie title since 2008.

=== Newcastle United ===
On 11 July 2015, Wijnaldum joined English Premier League club Newcastle United on a five-year contract, for a reported transfer fee of £14.5 million, making him the most expensive signing of Mike Ashley's ownership. Wijnaldum made his debut on 9 August as Newcastle began the season with a 2–2 home draw against Southampton, heading in a goal from Gabriel Obertan's cross. He would score his second Newcastle goal in a 2–2 draw with Chelsea on 26 September. On 18 October, Wijnaldum scored four goals in a 6–2 home win over Norwich City, becoming only the second Newcastle player to score more than three goals in a Premier League match. Wijnaldum was considered the player of the match in a game against Liverpool when he forced Martin Škrtel into an own goal as well as scoring himself in a 2–0 win. He scored against Manchester United in a 3–3 draw on 12 January 2016, and again four days later in a 2–1 win against West Ham United, and later scored twice against Tottenham Hotspur in a 5–1 win on the final day of the season, finishing the season as Newcastle's top goalscorer. However, after the season, Newcastle were relegated to the Championship.

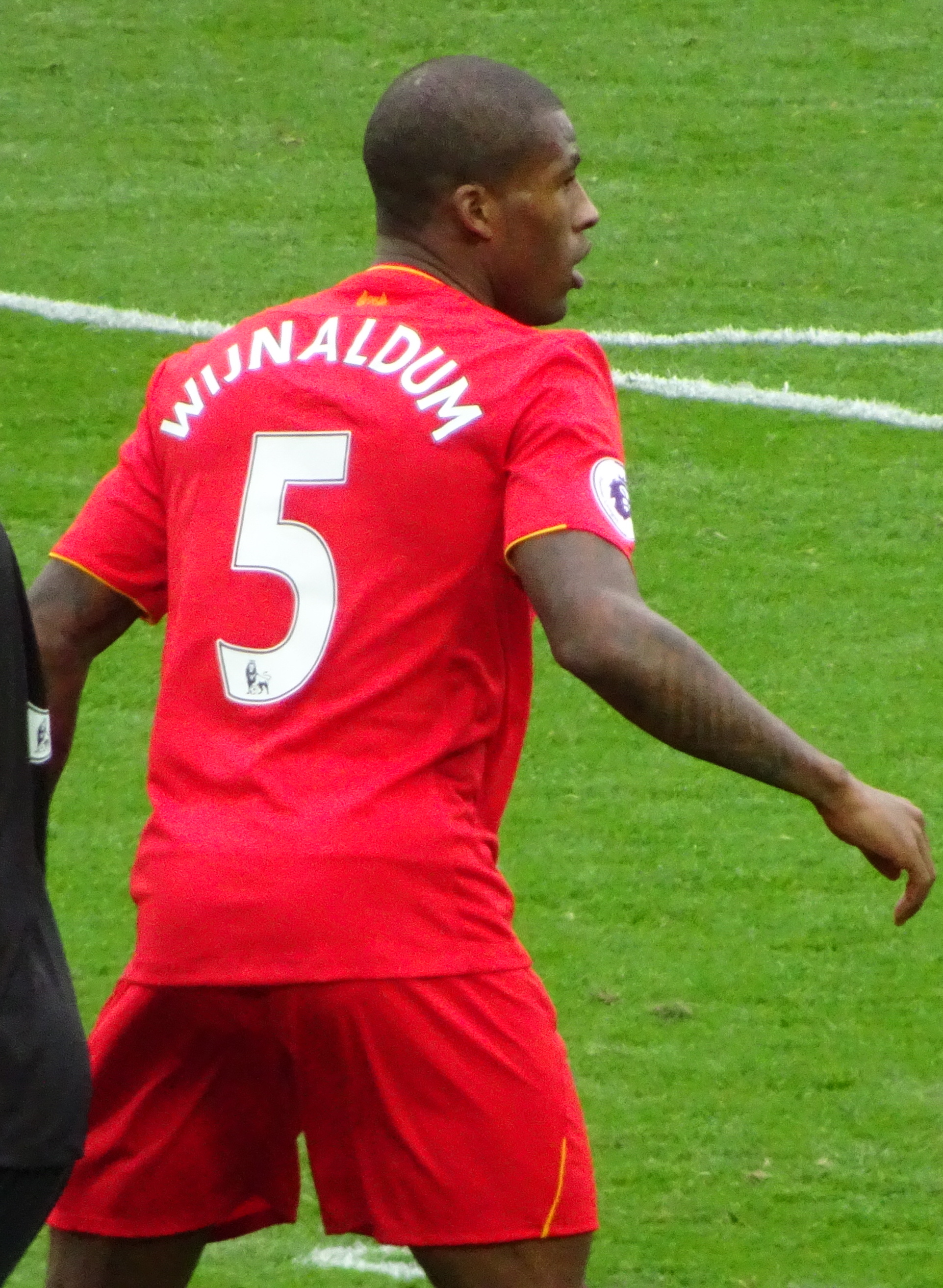
Wijnaldum playing for Liverpool in 2016

=== Liverpool ===
On 22 July 2016, Wijnaldum returned to the Premier League, signing for Liverpool on a five-year contract, for an initial £23 million with a further £2 million in conditional add-ons. He was given the number 5 shirt.

==== 2016–17 season ====
Wijnaldum made his Premier League debut for Liverpool at Arsenal on 14 August 2016, where he played 80 minutes and provided an assist for Adam Lallana before being replaced by Kevin Stewart in a 4–3 win. He scored his first goal for the club in a 6–1 thrashing of Watford on 6 November. On 31 December, he scored the match's only goal with a powerful header in Liverpool's 1–0 win over Manchester City to take Liverpool four points clear in second. He was highly praised for his goal. Wijnaldum sealed Liverpool's 3–1 win over Arsenal on 4 March 2017 with a close-range finish in stoppage time. In the final match of the 2016–17 Premier League season, with Liverpool needing a win over Middlesbrough to secure a top-four finish and a 2017–18 UEFA Champions League berth, Wijnaldum opened the scoring with a first-half stoppage time goal as Liverpool won 3–0.

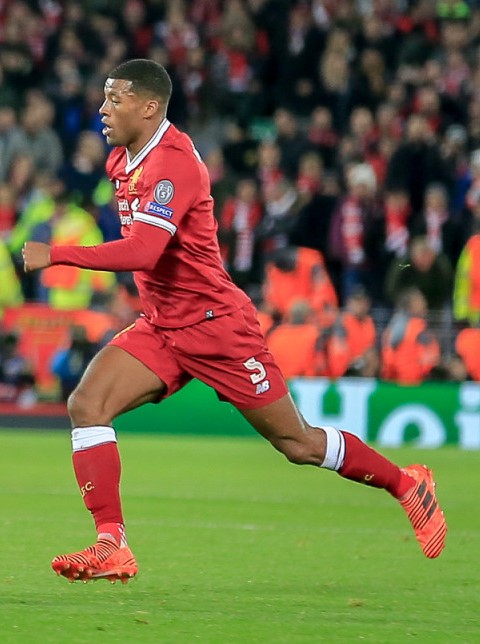
Wijnaldum playing for Liverpool in 2017

==== 2017–18 season ====
On 28 October 2017, Wijnaldum scored his first goal of the 2017–18 season, scoring the third goal in Liverpool's 3–0 win over newly promoted Huddersfield Town. On 2 May 2018, Wijnaldum scored his first away goal since May 2015, and his first for an English club, when he netted in a 7–6 aggregate victory over Roma to help Liverpool progress to the final of the 2017–18 Champions League. His goal also saw Liverpool break the competition's record for the most goals scored in a single campaign, with the club's tally of 46 surpassing the record of 45 previously held by Barcelona. Wijnaldum played for Liverpool in the 2018 UEFA Champions League Final against Real Madrid, playing the full 90 minutes as Liverpool lost 1–3.

==== 2018–19 season ====
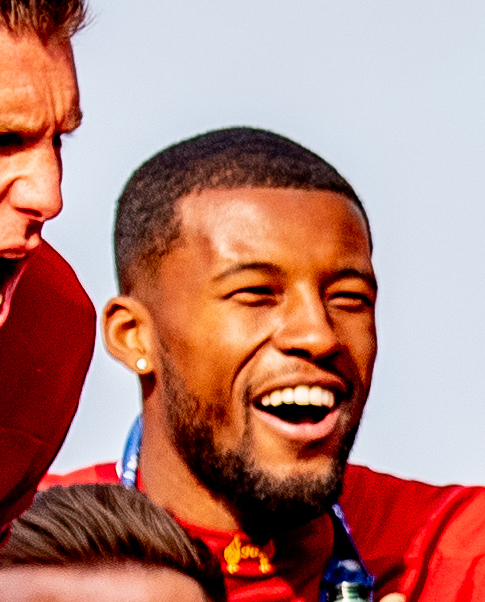
Wijnaldum during the victory parade after Liverpool won the 2019 UEFA Champions League Final

On 15 September 2018, Wijnaldum scored his first ever Premier League away goal, scoring the opening goal in a 2–1 win over Tottenham Hotspur. He made his 100th appearance for the club on 29 September in a 1–1 Premier League draw with Chelsea. On 14 April 2019, and against the same opposition, he made his 100th Premier League appearance for Liverpool. Notably coming on as a substitute in the second leg of the Champions League semi-final against Barcelona, Wijnaldum scored twice in two minutes to draw Liverpool level with Barcelona at 3–3 on aggregate before Divock Origi's second goal of the night sent Liverpool to the final. In the final, Liverpool went on to beat Tottenham Hotspur 2–0.

==== 2019–20 season ====
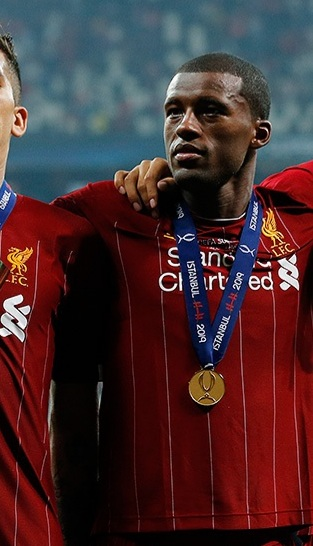
Wijnaldum with Liverpool after winning the 2019 UEFA Super Cup

At the start of the 2019–20 season, Wijnaldum was first choice in Liverpool's competitive midfield selection. Following Manchester City's FA Cup and League double the previous season, Liverpool were invited to the 2019 FA Community Shield as the league runners-up. Wijnaldum was named in the starting lineup, playing the full match and was one of Liverpool's penalty takers in the subsequent penalty shoot-out but missed what turned out to be the crucial penalty as Man City won 5–4 on spot-kicks. After starting against Norwich City in the Red's opening Premier League game, he was on the bench for the 2019 UEFA Super Cup against Chelsea which Liverpool had qualified for via last season's Champions League win. Wijnaldum was brought on for James Milner in the 64th minute. He played the remainder of the game but was not included among the penalty takers for the resulting shoot-out. Liverpool ended up winning 6–5 on penalties as Wijnaldum won his second trophy in three months. On 4 December 2019, just two days after being voted 26th in the polls for the 2019 Ballon d'Or award, Wijnaldum scored for Liverpool in the club's 5–2 Merseyside derby win over Everton as Liverpool extended their unbeaten run in league football to a club-record 32 matches. He was one of Liverpool's key players as they won their first league title in 30 years, playing in all but one of the club's 38 Premier League matches, scoring four goals.

==== 2020–21 season ====
During the 2020–21 season, Wijnaldum scored 3 goals in 51 appearances in all competitions for Liverpool. He helped the club make the quarter-finals of the Champions League and secure a spot for the following season in the competition. On 23 May 2021, Wijnaldum played his final match for Liverpool, a 2–0 win over Crystal Palace. Manager Jürgen Klopp officially confirmed his departure from the club at the end of his contract.

=== Paris Saint-Germain ===
On 7 June 2021, Wijnaldum signed a three-year contract with Ligue 1 club Paris Saint-Germain (PSG), as reported by Fabrizio Romano and The Guardian. PSG reportedly "hijacked" a move for the midfielder by La Liga club Barcelona, offering him "twice the wage" Barcelona had offered. The move was officially announced on 10 June, and Wijnaldum's presentation at PSG was on 22 July. He chose the number 18 jersey.

Wijnaldum scored his first two goals for PSG in a 2–2 Champions League draw against RB Leipzig on 3 November 2021. His first Ligue 1 goal came in a 1–1 away draw with Lens on 4 December, when he rescued a point with an injury-time header. By the end of the season, Wijnaldum had won the league title with Paris Saint-Germain.

==== Loan to Roma ====
On 4 August 2022, Serie A club Roma announced the signing of Wijnaldum, on loan from PSG. As part of the agreement, Roma received an option to make the move permanent at the end of the 2022–23 season. On 14 August, he made his debut for the club, as a substitute, in a 1–0 away win over Salernitana. On 21 August, it was announced that Wijnaldum had suffered a tibia fracture in training, and that he would be expected to miss the majority of the season. He made his return to competition with Roma on 11 February 2023, almost six months later, as a substitute in a 1–1 away draw against Lecce. On 12 March, Wijnaldum scored his first goal for Roma in a 4–3 home defeat to Sassuolo, a chip over the goalkeeper in stoppage time.

=== Al-Ettifaq ===
On 2 September 2023, Wijnaldum signed for Saudi Pro League club Al-Ettifaq on a three-year contract, in which he rejoined his former teammate at Liverpool, Jordan Henderson. In January 2024, Henderson left the club and Wijnaldum assumed the captaincy.

Wijnaldum left the club on 1 June 2026 after his contract was not renewed.

=== Al-Ittihad ===
On 7 September 2026, Wijnaldum joined fellow Saudi side Al-Ittihad on a free transfer.

== International career ==
=== Youth ===
Wijnaldum was one of the key players of the Netherlands under-17 squad on the 2007 UEFA European Under-17 Championship in Belgium. However, the team finished third in their group behind England and Belgium, failing to qualify for the knockout stage. Quickly after the tournament, Wijnaldum was selected for the Netherlands under-19 squad. Despite excellent individual performances, the team underachieved and failed to qualify for the 2008 UEFA European Under-19 Championship in the Czech Republic and 2009 UEFA European Under-19 Championship in Ukraine.

On 12 November 2008, Wijnaldum was invited to the Netherlands B squad by manager Johan Neeskens but had to deny the invitation due to an injury.

Wijnaldum had to deny his first Netherlands under-21 invitation on 9 August 2009. He received an invitation for the friendly match against England by manager Cor Pot. Wijnaldum made his official Netherlands under-21 debut on 4 September 2009 in a 2011 UEFA European Under-21 Championship qualification match against Finland, which ended in a 2–0 victory.

Wijnaldum was selected for the Netherlands at the 2013 UEFA European Under-21 Championship, where he made three appearances and scored against both Germany and Russia, as the Jong Oranje reached the semi-final stage, where they were beaten by Italy.

=== Senior ===
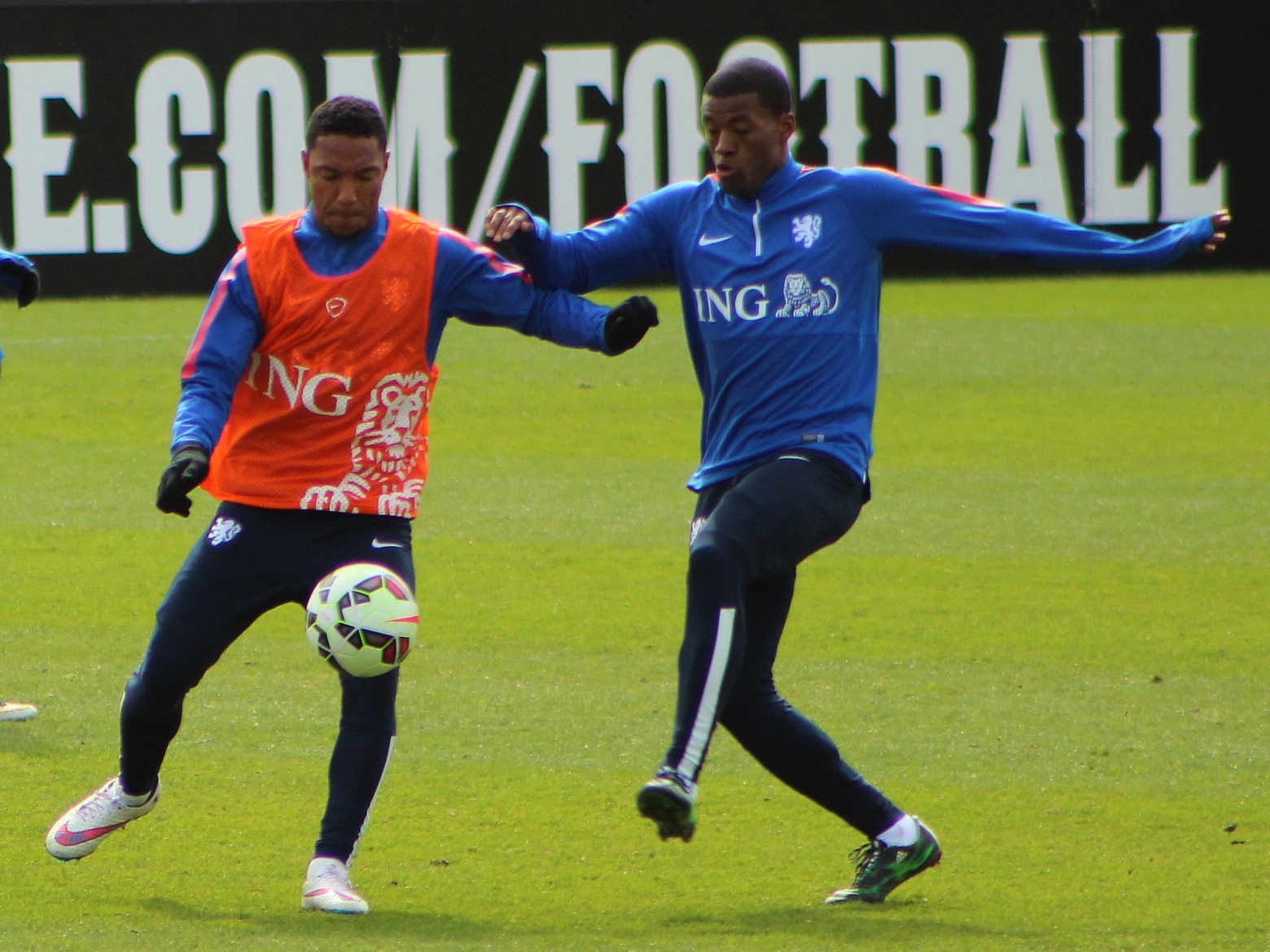
Wijnaldum (right) training alongside Jonathan de Guzman (left) with the Netherlands in 2015

On 30 May 2011, Wijnaldum was named in the Netherlands senior squad for friendlies against Brazil and Uruguay, but did not play in either match. He made his international debut in the match against San Marino on 2 September 2011, appearing as a substitute in the 86th minute and promptly scoring the final goal in an 11–0 win.

Wijnaldum was a member of the Netherlands squad for the 2014 FIFA World Cup, where he appeared as a substitute in the team's opening two group matches against Spain and Australia. After making his first start of the tournament in the final Group B match against Chile, Wijnaldum retained his place in the starting line-up for the remainder of the Netherlands' run to the semi-finals, where they were beaten by Argentina in a penalty shootout. In the third-place play-off, he scored his second goal for the Oranje as they defeated host nation Brazil 3–0 .

On 9 September 2018, he made his 50th appearance for the Netherlands in a 2–1 UEFA Nations League loss to France. He went on to score in home wins against Germany and France as the Netherlands qualified for the 2019 UEFA Nations League Finals, where he played the full match in both the semi-final win against England and final loss to Portugal.

During qualification for UEFA Euro 2020, Wijnaldum was the leading goalscorer for the Netherlands with eight goals. At the tournament finals, he captained the nation in the absence of Virgil van Dijk, who was recovering from an anterior cruciate ligament injury. Wijnaldum scored the first goal of the Netherlands' 3–2 win over Ukraine in their opening Euro 2020 match and scored a further two goals in the final Group C match – a 3–0 victory of North Macedonia.

After sustaining a fractured tibia while playing for A.S. Roma in August 2022, Wijnaldum was unable to feature for the Netherlands at the 2022 FIFA World Cup. He returned to the squad for the UEFA Euro 2024 qualifiers in March 2023, where he started both matches against France and Gibraltar.

In June 2023, Wijnaldum was a member of the Dutch squad for the 2023 UEFA Nations League Finals. He appeared as a substitute against both Croatia in the semi-final and Italy in the third place play-off, scoring the team's second goal of a 3–2 loss in the latter.

On 29 May 2024, Wijnaldum was named in the Netherlands' squad for UEFA Euro 2024.

== Activism and campaigning ==
On 20 November 2019, following racist abuse aimed at Ahmad Mendes Moreira in the Eredivisie, Wijnaldum celebrated a goal for the Netherlands against Estonia by gesturing at his skin colour in support of Mendes Moreira.

On 23 June 2021, Wijnaldum announced that he would wear a rainbow armband under the slogan OneLove during the Netherlands' UEFA Euro 2020 round of 16 match against Czechia in a show of solidarity to both the LGBT community and German captain Manuel Neuer, who had a case opened against him at UEFA for wearing the rainbow armband. The case was later dismissed.

== Career statistics ==
=== Club ===
As of match played 20 October 2026

Appearances and goals by club, season and competition
Club	Season	League			National cup (Note: Includes KNVB Cup, FA Cup, Coupe de France, King's Cup)		League cup (Note: Includes Football League/EFL Cup)		Continental		Other		Total	
Club	Season	Division	Apps	Goals	Apps	Goals	Apps	Goals	Apps	Goals	Apps	Goals	Apps	Goals
Feyenoord	2006–07	Eredivisie	3	0	0	0	—		0	0	—		3	0
Feyenoord	2007–08	Eredivisie	10	1	2	0	—		0	0	—		12	1
Feyenoord	2008–09	Eredivisie	33	4	3	0	—		6 (Note: Appearances in UEFA Cup)	1	3 (Note: One appearance in Johan Cruyff Shield, two in Eredivisie European play-offs)	0	45	5
Feyenoord	2009–10	Eredivisie	31	4	7	1	—		—		—		38	5
Feyenoord	2010–11	Eredivisie	34	14	1	0	—		2 (Note: Appearances in UEFA Europa League)	0	—		37	14
Feyenoord	Total		111	23	13	1	—		8	1	3	0	135	25
PSV Eindhoven	2011–12	Eredivisie	32	8	6	2	—		12	4	—		50	14
PSV Eindhoven	2012–13	Eredivisie	33	14	6	1	—		5	4	1 (Note: Appearance in Johan Cruyff Shield)	1	45	20
PSV Eindhoven	2013–14	Eredivisie	11	4	0	0	—		4 (Note: Appearances in UEFA Champions League)	0	—		15	4
PSV Eindhoven	2014–15	Eredivisie	33	14	3	2	—		8	2	—		44	18
PSV Eindhoven	Total		109	40	15	5	—		29	10	1	1	154	56
Newcastle United	2015–16	Premier League	38	11	1	0	1	0	—		—		40	11
Liverpool	2016–17	Premier League	36	6	1	0	5	0	—		—		42	6
Liverpool	2017–18	Premier League	33	1	2	0	1	0	14	1	—		50	2
Liverpool	2018–19	Premier League	35	3	0	0	0	0	12	2	—		47	5
Liverpool	2019–20	Premier League	37	4	0	0	0	0	8	2	2 (Note: One appearance in FA Community Shield, one appearance in UEFA Super Cup)	0	47	6
Liverpool	2020–21	Premier League	38	2	2	1	1	0	9	0	1 (Note: Appearance in FA Community Shield)	0	51	3
Liverpool	Total		179	16	5	1	7	0	43	5	3	0	237	22
Paris Saint-Germain	2021–22	Ligue 1	31	1	1	0	—		5	2	1 (Note: Appearance in Trophée des Champions)	0	38	3
Roma (loan)	2022–23	Serie A	14	2	0	0	—		9	0	—		23	2
Al-Ettifaq	2023–24	Saudi Pro League	29	6	2	1	—		—		—		31	7
Al-Ettifaq	2024–25	Saudi Pro League	34	14	2	0	—		—		6 (Note: Appearances in AGCFF Gulf Club Champions League)	1	42	15
Al-Ettifaq	2025–26	Saudi Pro League	33	16	1	1	—		—		—		34	17
Al-Ettifaq	Total		96	36	5	2	—		—		6	1	107	39
Al-Ittihad	2026–27	Saudi Pro League	3	0	0	0	—		2 (Note: Appearances in AFC Champions League Elite)	1	—		5	1
Career total			580	129	40	9	8	0	96	19	14	2	738	159

=== International ===
Appearances and goals by national team and year
National team	Year	Apps	Goals
Netherlands	2011	2	1
Netherlands	2012	0	0
Netherlands	2013	1	0
Netherlands	2014	13	1
Netherlands	2015	9	2
Netherlands	2016	11	3
Netherlands	2017	9	1
Netherlands	2018	8	2
Netherlands	2019	9	8
Netherlands	2020	8	3
Netherlands	2021	15	5
Netherlands	2022	1	0
Netherlands	2023	4	1
Netherlands	2024	6	1
Total		96	28

Scores and results list Netherlands' goal tally first, score column indicates score after each Wijnaldum goal

List of international goals scored by Georginio Wijnaldum
No.	Date	Venue	Cap	Opponent	Score	Result	Competition
1	2 September 2011	Philips Stadion, Eindhoven, Netherlands	1	San Marino	11–0	11–0	UEFA Euro 2012 qualifying
2	12 July 2014	Estádio Nacional Mané Garrincha, Brasília, Brazil	12	Brazil	3–0	3–0	2014 FIFA World Cup
3	12 June 2015	Skonto Stadium, Riga, Latvia	20	Latvia	1–0	2–0	UEFA Euro 2016 qualifying
4	10 October 2015	Astana Arena, Astana, Kazakhstan	23	Kazakhstan	1–0	2–1	UEFA Euro 2016 qualifying
5	1 June 2016	Stadion Energa Gdańsk, Gdańsk, Poland	29	Poland	2–1	2–1	Friendly
6	4 June 2016	Ernst-Happel-Stadion, Vienna, Austria	30	Austria	2–0	2–0	Friendly
7	1 September 2016	Philips Stadion, Eindhoven, Netherlands	31	Greece	1–0	1–2	Friendly
8	9 June 2017	De Kuip, Rotterdam, Netherlands	40	Luxembourg	3–0	5–0	2018 FIFA World Cup qualification
9	13 October 2018	Johan Cruyff Arena, Amsterdam, Netherlands	51	Germany	3–0	3–0	2018–19 UEFA Nations League A
10	16 November 2018	De Kuip, Rotterdam, Netherlands	52	France	1–0	2–0	2018–19 UEFA Nations League A
11	21 March 2019	De Kuip, Rotterdam, Netherlands	54	Belarus	2–0	4–0	UEFA Euro 2020 qualifying
12	6 September 2019	Volksparkstadion, Hamburg, Germany	58	Germany	4–2	4–2	UEFA Euro 2020 qualifying
13	9 September 2019	A. Le Coq Arena, Tallinn, Estonia	59	Estonia	4–0	4–0	UEFA Euro 2020 qualifying
14	13 October 2019	Dinamo Stadium, Minsk, Belarus	61	Belarus	1–0	2–1	UEFA Euro 2020 qualifying
15	13 October 2019	Dinamo Stadium, Minsk, Belarus	61	Belarus	2–0	2–1	UEFA Euro 2020 qualifying
16	19 November 2019	Johan Cruyff Arena, Amsterdam, Netherlands	62	Estonia	1–0	5–0	UEFA Euro 2020 qualifying
17	19 November 2019	Johan Cruyff Arena, Amsterdam, Netherlands	62	Estonia	3–0	5–0	UEFA Euro 2020 qualifying
18	19 November 2019	Johan Cruyff Arena, Amsterdam, Netherlands	62	Estonia	4–0	5–0	UEFA Euro 2020 qualifying
19	15 November 2020	Johan Cruyff Arena, Amsterdam, Netherlands	69	Bosnia and Herzegovina	1–0	3–1	2020–21 UEFA Nations League A
20	15 November 2020	Johan Cruyff Arena, Amsterdam, Netherlands	69	Bosnia and Herzegovina	2–0	3–1	2020–21 UEFA Nations League A
21	18 November 2020	Silesian Stadium, Chorzów, Poland	70	Poland	2–1	2–1	2020–21 UEFA Nations League A
22	30 March 2021	Victoria Stadium, Gibraltar	73	Gibraltar	4–0	7–0	2022 FIFA World Cup qualification
23	13 June 2021	Johan Cruyff Arena, Amsterdam, Netherlands	76	Ukraine	1–0	3–2	UEFA Euro 2020
24	21 June 2021	Johan Cruyff Arena, Amsterdam, Netherlands	78	North Macedonia	2–0	3–0	UEFA Euro 2020
25	21 June 2021	Johan Cruyff Arena, Amsterdam, Netherlands	78	North Macedonia	3–0	3–0	UEFA Euro 2020
26	4 September 2021	Philips Stadion, Eindhoven, Netherlands	81	Montenegro	3–0	4–0	2022 FIFA World Cup qualification
27	18 June 2023	De Grolsch Veste, Enschede, Netherlands	90	Italy	2–3	2–3	2023 UEFA Nations League Finals
28	22 March 2024	Johan Cruyff Arena, Amsterdam, Netherlands	91	Scotland	2–0	4–0	Friendly

== Honours ==
Feyenoord

- KNVB Cup: 2007–08

PSV

- Eredivisie: 2014–15
- KNVB Cup: 2011–12
- Johan Cruyff Shield: 2012

Liverpool

- Premier League: 2019–20
- UEFA Champions League: 2018–19; runner-up: 2017–18
- UEFA Super Cup: 2019
- FIFA Club World Cup: 2019

Paris Saint-Germain

- Ligue 1: 2021–22

Roma

- UEFA Europa League runner-up: 2022–23

Netherlands

- FIFA World Cup third place: 2014
- UEFA Nations League runner-up: 2018–19

Individual

- Dutch Footballer of the Year: 2014–15
- UEFA Champions League Squad of the Season: 2018–19
- UEFA Nations League Finals Team of the Tournament: 2019
- Rotterdam Talent of the Year: 2007
