= Football at the 2020 Summer Olympics – Men's qualification =

Sixteen teams qualified for the men's Olympic football tournament. In addition to host nation Japan, 15 men's national teams qualified from six separate continental confederations.

== Table ==
Means of qualification	Ref.	Dates^{1}	Venue(s)^{1}	Berth(s)	Qualified
Host nation		—N/a	—N/a	1	Japan
2019 UEFA European Under-21 Championship		16–30 June 2019	Italy; San Marino	4	Spain; Germany; France; Romania
2019 OFC Men's Olympic Qualifying Tournament		21 September – 5 October 2019	Fiji	1	New Zealand
2019 Africa U-23 Cup of Nations		8–22 November 2019	Egypt	3	Egypt; Ivory Coast; South Africa
2020 AFC U-23 Championship		8–26 January 2020	Thailand	3	South Korea; Saudi Arabia; Australia
2020 CONMEBOL Pre-Olympic Tournament		18 January – 9 February 2020	Colombia	2	Argentina; Brazil
2020 CONCACAF Olympic Qualifying Championship		18–30 March 2021	Mexico	2	Mexico; Honduras
Total				16	

- ^1 Dates and venues are those of final tournaments (or final round of qualification tournaments), various qualification stages may precede matches at these specific venues.

== 2019 UEFA European Under-21 Championship ==
=== Qualified teams ===
Team	Method of qualification	Date of qualification	Appearance	Last appearance	Previous best performance
Italy	Hosts	9 December 2016	20th	2017 (semi-finals)	Champions (1992, 1994, 1996, 2000, 2004)
Spain	Group 2 winners	6 September 2018	14th	2017 (runners-up)	Champions (1986, 1998, 2011, 2013)
France	Group 9 winners	7 September 2018	9th	2006 (semi-finals)	Champions (1988)
England	Group 4 winners	11 October 2018	15th	2017 (semi-finals)	Champions (1982, 1984)
Serbia	Group 7 winners	12 October 2018	11th	2017 (group stage)	Champions (1978) (as Yugoslavia)
Germany	Group 5 winners	12 October 2018	12th	2017 (champions)	Champions (2009, 2017)
Croatia	Group 1 winners	15 October 2018	3rd	2004 (group stage)	Group stage (2000, 2004)
Denmark	Group 3 winners	16 October 2018	8th	2017 (group stage)	Semi-finals (1992, 2015)
Belgium	Group 6 winners	16 October 2018	3rd	2007 (semi-finals)	Semi-finals (2007)
Romania	Group 8 winners	16 October 2018	2nd	1998 (quarter-finals)	Quarter-finals (1998)
Poland	Play-off winners	20 November 2018	7th	2017 (group stage)	Quarter-finals (1982, 1984, 1986, 1992, 1994)
Austria	Play-off winners	20 November 2018	1st	—	Debut

Notes

1. The constituent countries of the UK are represented individually at FIFA (and, thus, UEFA) tournaments, but together at the Olympics. While in the women's competition, the football associations of Northern Ireland, Wales and Scotland allowed their players to compete as Great Britain in the Olympics, they did not in the men's, with the concern that it would threaten their independence in other competitions. While England's position would qualify a Great Britain team, the football associations refused to be represented. Great Britain did not send either a women's or men's football team to the 2016 Olympics, due to the same issue, though contested the event with both teams at home in 2012.
2. Appearances include 4 as Yugoslavia and 2 as Serbia and Montenegro. Their previous best performance as Serbia was runners-up (2007).

== 2019 Africa U-23 Cup of Nations ==
=== Qualified teams ===
Team	Appearance	Previous best performance
Egypt (hosts)	3rd	Third place (2011)
Cameroon	1st	Debut
Ghana	1st	Debut
Ivory Coast	2nd	Group stage (2011)
Mali	2nd	Group stage (2015)
Nigeria	3rd	Champions (2015)
South Africa	3rd	Third place (2015)
Zambia	2nd	Group stage (2015)

== 2020 AFC U-23 Championship ==
=== Qualified teams ===
Team	Qualified as	Appearance	Previous best performance
Thailand	Hosts	3rd	Group stage (2016, 2018)
Qatar	Group A winners	3rd	Third place (2018)
Bahrain	Group B winners	1st	Debut
Iraq	Group C winners	4th	Champions (2013)
United Arab Emirates	Group D winners	3rd	Quarter-finals (2013, 2016)
Jordan	Group E winners	4th	Third place (2013)
Uzbekistan	Group F winners	4th	Champions (2018)
North Korea	Group G winners	4th	Quarter-finals (2016)
South Korea	Group H winners	4th	Runners-up (2016)
Japan	Group I winners	4th	Champions (2016)
China	Group J winners	4th	Group stage (2013, 2016, 2018)
Vietnam	Group K winners	3rd	Runners-up (2018)
Australia	Group H runners-up (Note: The four best runners-up qualified for the final tournament.)	4th	Quarter-finals (2013)
Iran	Group C runners-up	3rd	Quarter-finals (2016)
Syria	Group E runners-up	4th	Quarter-finals (2013)
Saudi Arabia	Group D runners-up	4th	Runners-up (2013)

== 2020 CONMEBOL Pre-Olympic Tournament ==
- Argentina
- Bolivia
- Brazil
- Chile
- Colombia
- Ecuador
- Paraguay
- Peru
- Uruguay
- Venezuela

== 2020 CONCACAF Olympic Qualifying Championship ==
=== Qualified teams ===
Team	Qualification zone	Appearance	Previous best performance	Previous men's Olympic appearances
Canada	North America (automatic)	9th	Runner-up (1984, 1996)	3
Mexico (hosts & title holders)	North America (automatic)	12th	Winner (1964, 1972, 1976, 1996, 2004, 2012, 2015)	11
United States	North America (automatic)	11th	Winner (1988, 1992)	14
Costa Rica	Central America	7th	Winner (1980, 1984)	3
El Salvador	Central America	12th	Third Place (2012)	1
Honduras	Central America	10th	Winner (2000, 2008)	4
Dominican Republic	Caribbean	1st	Debutant	0
Haiti	Caribbean	3rd	Group stage (2008, 2015)	0
