= 2019 UEFA European Under-21 Championship qualification Group 8 =

Football tournament qualification stage

Group 8 of the 2019 UEFA European Under-21 Championship qualifying competition consisted of six teams: Portugal, Switzerland, Romania, Wales, Bosnia and Herzegovina, and Liechtenstein. The composition of the nine groups in the qualifying group stage was decided by the draw held on 26 January 2017, with the teams seeded according to their coefficient ranking.

The group was played in home-and-away round-robin format between 28 March 2017 and 16 October 2018. The group winners qualified directly for the final tournament, while the runners-up advanced to the play-offs if they were one of the four best runners-up among all nine groups (not counting results against the sixth-placed team).

== Standings ==
| Pos | Team | Pld | W | D | L | GF | GA | GD | Pts | Qualification | Romania | Portugal | Bosnia and Herzegovina | Wales | Switzerland | Liechtenstein |
|---|---|---|---|---|---|---|---|---|---|---|---|---|---|---|---|---|
| 1 | Romania | 10 | 7 | 3 | 0 | 19 | 4 | +15 | 24 | Final tournament | — | 1–1 | 2–0 | 2–0 | 1–1 | 4–0 |
| 2 | Portugal | 10 | 7 | 1 | 2 | 33 | 11 | +22 | 22 | Play-offs | 1–2 | — | 4–2 | 2–0 | 2–1 | 7–0 |
| 3 | Bosnia and Herzegovina | 10 | 6 | 0 | 4 | 24 | 11 | +13 | 18 | | 1–3 | 3–1 | — | 1–0 | 3–0 | 6–0 |
| 4 | Wales | 10 | 4 | 1 | 5 | 11 | 14 | −3 | 13 | | 0–0 | 0–2 | 0–4 | — | 3–1 | 2–1 |
| 5 | Switzerland | 10 | 3 | 1 | 6 | 11 | 18 | −7 | 10 | | 0–2 | 2–4 | 1–0 | 0–3 | — | 3–0 |
| 6 | Liechtenstein | 10 | 0 | 0 | 10 | 2 | 42 | −40 | 0 | | 0–2 | 0–9 | 0–4 | 1–3 | 0–2 | — |

Source: UEFA
Rules for classification: Qualification tiebreakers

== Matches ==
Times are CET/CEST, (Note: CEST (UTC+2) for dates between 26 March and 28 October 2017 and between 25 March and 27 October 2018, and CET (UTC+1) for all other dates.) as listed by UEFA (local times, if different, are in parentheses).

28 March 2017
15:00

| Bosnia and Herzegovina | 6–0 | Liechtenstein |
|---|---|---|
| Hadžiahmetović 10'; Gojak 13' (pen.); Aganspahić 20'; Kuzmanović 82', 90'; Beganović 83' | Report |

Bosnia and Herzegovina FA Training Centre, Zenica
Attendance: 825
Referee: Filip Glova (Slovakia)

13 June 2017
19:00

| Switzerland | 1–0 | Bosnia and Herzegovina |
|---|---|---|
| Haas 11' | Report |

Tissot Arena, Biel/Bienne
Attendance: 1,518
Referee: Lawrence Visser (Belgium)
13 June 2017
19:00

| Liechtenstein | 0–2 | Romania |
|---|---|---|
| | Report | Pușcaș 45', 71' |

Sportpark Eschen-Mauren, Eschen
Attendance: 427
Referee: Zaven Hovhannisyan (Armenia)

1 September 2017
17:00

| Bosnia and Herzegovina | 1–3 | Romania |
|---|---|---|
| Nedelcu 23' (o.g.) | Report | Pușcaș 32'; Coman 54'; Man 90+5' |

Bosnia and Herzegovina FA Training Centre, Zenica
Attendance: 400
Referee: Yuriy Mozharovskyy (Ukraine)
1 September 2017
19:00

| Switzerland | 0–3 | Wales |
|---|---|---|
| | Report | Roberts 7'; Brooks 27'; Thomas 90+1' |

Tissot Arena, Biel/Bienne
Attendance: 412
Referee: Tihomir Pejin (Croatia)

5 September 2017
18:00 (19:00 EEST)

| Romania | 1–1 | Switzerland |
|---|---|---|
| Pușcaș 22' | Report | Oberlin 19' |

Stadionul Viitorul, Ovidiu
Attendance: 1,621
Referee: Krzysztof Jakubik (Poland)
5 September 2017
20:15 (19:15 WEST)

| Portugal | 2–0 | Wales |
|---|---|---|
| Neves 25' (pen.); Guedes 41' | Report |

Estádio Municipal Eng. Manuel Branco Teixeira, Chaves
Attendance: 7,111
Referee: Anders Poulsen (Denmark)

5 October 2017
18:30

| Liechtenstein | 1–3 | Wales |
|---|---|---|
| Kardesoglu 57' | Report | Thomas 24', 31' (pen.); Smith 52' |

Sportpark Eschen-Mauren, Eschen
Attendance: 278
Referee: Jason Lee Barcelo (Gibraltar)
6 October 2017
19:00

| Switzerland | 0–2 | Romania |
|---|---|---|
| | Report | Dobre 24'; Cicâldău 87' |

Cornaredo Stadium, Lugano
Attendance: 550
Referee: Georgi Kabakov (Bulgaria)

10 October 2017
15:30

| Bosnia and Herzegovina | 3–1 | Portugal |
|---|---|---|
| Šerbečić 22'; Demirović 77'; Menalo 90+5' | Report | Carvalho 10' |

Bosnia and Herzegovina FA Training Centre, Zenica
Attendance: 600
Referee: Manuel Schüttengruber (Austria)
10 October 2017
18:00

| Liechtenstein | 0–2 | Switzerland |
|---|---|---|
| | Report | Spielmann 34', 51' |

Rheinpark Stadion, Vaduz
Attendance: 471
Referee: Denis Scherbakov (Belarus)

10 November 2017
18:00 (19:00 EET)

| Romania | 1–1 | Portugal |
|---|---|---|
| Man 66' | Report | Gonçalves 16' |

Stadionul Viitorul, Ovidiu
Attendance: 2,553
Referee: José María Sánchez Martínez (Spain)
10 November 2017
19:00 (18:00 GMT)

| Wales | 0–4 | Bosnia and Herzegovina |
|---|---|---|
| | Report | Gojak 26', 51'; Ćavar 71'; Menalo 77' |

Nantporth, Bangor
Attendance: 1,041
Referee: Christos Nicolaides (Cyprus)

14 November 2017
18:30 (17:30 WET)

| Portugal | 2–1 | Switzerland |
|---|---|---|
| Gonçalves 10'; Jota 29' | Report | Garcia 39' |

Estádio da Mata Real, Paços de Ferreira
Attendance: 6,554
Referee: Andrew Dallas (Scotland)
14 November 2017
19:00 (18:00 GMT)

| Wales | 0–0 | Romania |
|---|---|---|
| | Report |

Nantporth, Bangor
Attendance: 916
Referee: Bastian Dankert (Germany)

23 March 2018
15:00

| Bosnia and Herzegovina | 1–0 | Wales |
|---|---|---|
| Todorović 65' | Report |

Bosnia and Herzegovina FA Training Centre, Zenica
Attendance: 800
Referee: Espen Eskås (Norway)
23 March 2018
18:45 (17:45 WET)

| Portugal | 7–0 | Liechtenstein |
|---|---|---|
| Gonçalves 7', 30', 63'; Carvalho 10', 45'; Xadas 26'; Félix 67' | Report |

Estádio João Cardoso, Tondela
Attendance: 2,847
Referee: Genc Nuza (Kosovo)

27 March 2018
17:00

| Switzerland | 2–4 | Portugal |
|---|---|---|
| Sow 4'; Cömert 37' | Report | Tavares 50'; Horta 57'; Félix 64'; Dias 90' |

Stade de la Maladière, Neuchâtel
Attendance: 2,070
Referee: Mohammed Al-Hakim (Sweden)
27 March 2018
18:00

| Liechtenstein | 0–4 | Bosnia and Herzegovina |
|---|---|---|
| | Report | Čivić 35'; Ćavar 52'; Memija 71'; Gojak 90+2' |

Rheinpark Stadion, Vaduz
Attendance: 429
Referee: Giorgi Kruashvili (Georgia)

7 September 2018
17:00

| Bosnia and Herzegovina | 3–0 | Switzerland |
|---|---|---|
| Demirović 20', 34'; Čataković 87' | Report |

Bosnia and Herzegovina FA Training Centre, Zenica
Attendance: 1,100
Referee: Vitali Meshkov (Russia)
7 September 2018
19:00 (18:00 BST)

| Wales | 2–1 | Liechtenstein |
|---|---|---|
| Thomas 5', 18' | Report | Graber 78' |

Nantporth, Bangor
Attendance: 307
Referee: Laurent Kopriwa (Luxembourg)
7 September 2018
20:15 (19:15 WEST)

| Portugal | 1–2 | Romania |
|---|---|---|
| Carvalho 85' | Report | Cicâldău 52'; Ivan 59' |

Estádio da Mata Real, Paços de Ferreira
Attendance: 5,354
Referee: Ali Palabıyık (Turkey)

11 September 2018
18:00 (19:00 EEST)

| Romania | 2–0 | Bosnia and Herzegovina |
|---|---|---|
| Petre 16'; Hagi 70' | Report |

Stadionul Viitorul, Ovidiu
Attendance: 4,182
Referee: François Letexier (France)
11 September 2018
18:30

| Switzerland | 3–0 | Liechtenstein |
|---|---|---|
| Spielmann 63'; de Oliveira 68'; Cömert 79' | Report |

Tissot Arena, Biel/Bienne
Attendance: 324
Referee: Yaroslav Kozyk (Ukraine)
11 September 2018
19:00 (18:00 BST)

| Wales | 0–2 | Portugal |
|---|---|---|
| | Report | Horta 35'; Félix 73' |

Nantporth, Bangor
Attendance: 625
Referee: Mykola Balakin (Ukraine)

11 October 2018
18:30

| Liechtenstein | 0–9 | Portugal |
|---|---|---|
| | Report | Graber 1' (o.g.); Tavares 28', 46', 62', 90+2'; Filipe 45+1'; Gonçalves 58' (pen.); Jota 84'; Dias 90' |

Rheinpark Stadion, Vaduz
Attendance: 810
Referee: Aleksei Matyunin (Russia)
12 October 2018
18:00 (19:00 EEST)

| Romania | 2–0 | Wales |
|---|---|---|
| Man 55'; Pușcaș 71' | Report |

Stadionul Dr. Constantin Rădulescu, Cluj-Napoca
Attendance: 12,588
Referee: Boris Marhefka (Slovakia)

16 October 2018
19:00 (18:00 BST)

| Wales | 3–1 | Switzerland |
|---|---|---|
| Morrell 36'; Lemonheigh-Evans 38', 87' | Report | Zeqiri 76' |

Rodney Parade, Newport
Attendance: 242
Referee: Erik Lambrechts (Belgium)
16 October 2018
20:00 (19:00 WEST)

| Portugal | 4–2 | Bosnia and Herzegovina |
|---|---|---|
| Horta 20'; Félix 53'; Gonçalves 63'; Tavares 90+1' | Report | Demirović 44'; Turkes 90+4' |

Estádio do Marítimo, Funchal
Attendance: 8,037
Referee: Paul Tierney (England)
16 October 2018
20:00 (21:00 EEST)

| Romania | 4–0 | Liechtenstein |
|---|---|---|
| Pușcaș 14', 39'; Hagi 25'; Petre 78' | Report |

Stadionul Ilie Oană, Ploiești
Attendance: 12,108
Referee: Besfort Kasumi (Kosovo)

== Goalscorers ==
There were 100 goals scored in 30 matches, for an average of 3.33 goals per match.

7 goals

- (Portugal) Diogo Gonçalves
- (Romania) George Pușcaș

6 goals

- (Portugal) Heriberto Tavares

5 goals

- (Wales) George Thomas

4 goals

- (Bosnia and Herzegovina) Ermedin Demirović
- (Bosnia and Herzegovina) Amer Gojak
- (Portugal) João Carvalho
- (Portugal) João Félix

3 goals

- (Portugal) André Horta
- (Romania) Dennis Man
- (Switzerland) Marvin Spielmann

2 goals

- (Bosnia and Herzegovina) Marijan Ćavar
- (Bosnia and Herzegovina) Mićo Kuzmanović
- (Bosnia and Herzegovina) Luka Menalo
- (Portugal) Gil Dias
- (Portugal) Diogo Jota
- (Romania) Alexandru Cicâldău
- (Romania) Ianis Hagi
- (Romania) Adrian Petre
- (Switzerland) Eray Cömert
- (Wales) Connor Lemonheigh-Evans

1 goal

- (Bosnia and Herzegovina) Almir Aganspahić
- (Bosnia and Herzegovina) Dženis Beganović
- (Bosnia and Herzegovina) Hamza Čataković
- (Bosnia and Herzegovina) Eldar Čivić
- (Bosnia and Herzegovina) Amir Hadžiahmetović
- (Bosnia and Herzegovina) Kerim Memija
- (Bosnia and Herzegovina) Besim Šerbečić
- (Bosnia and Herzegovina) Darko Todorović
- (Bosnia and Herzegovina) Aldin Turkes
- (Liechtenstein) Lukas Graber
- (Liechtenstein) Ridvan Kardesoglu
- (Portugal) João Filipe
- (Portugal) Gonçalo Guedes
- (Portugal) Rúben Neves
- (Portugal) Xadas
- (Romania) Florinel Coman
- (Romania) Alex Dobre
- (Romania) Andrei Ivan
- (Switzerland) Ulisses Garcia
- (Switzerland) Nicolas Haas
- (Switzerland) Dimitri Oberlin
- (Switzerland) João de Oliveira
- (Switzerland) Djibril Sow
- (Switzerland) Andi Zeqiri
- (Wales) David Brooks
- (Wales) Joe Morrell
- (Wales) Tyler Roberts
- (Wales) Matthew Smith

1 own goal

- (Liechtenstein) Noah Graber (against Portugal)
- (Romania) Dragoș Nedelcu (against Bosnia and Herzegovina)
