= Borja Mayoral =

Spanish footballer (born 1997)

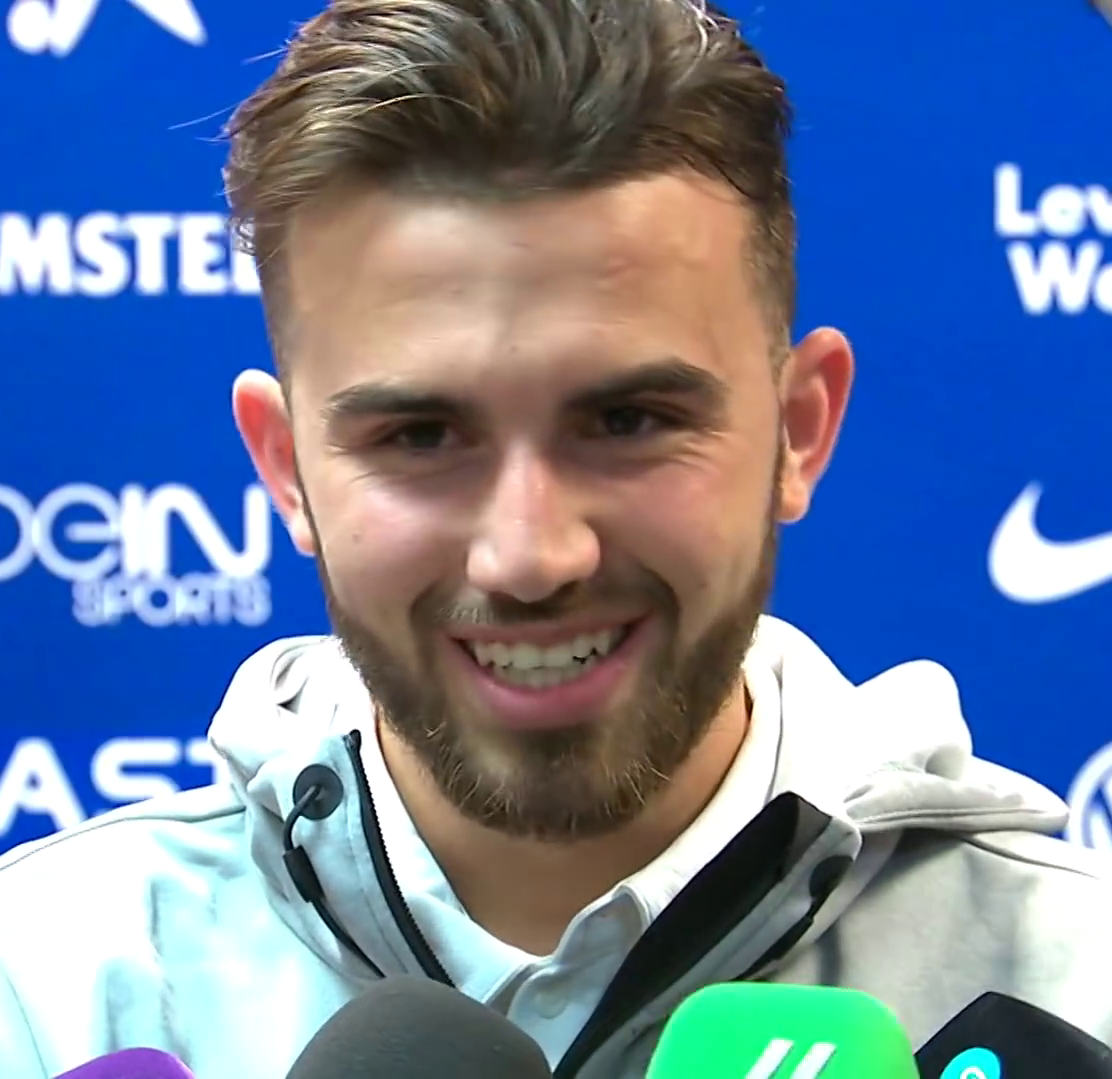
- Mayoral in 2016

Personal information
- Full name: Borja Mayoral Moya
- Date of birth: 5 April 1997 (age 29)
- Place of birth: Parla, Spain
- Height: 1.82 m (6 ft 0 in)
- Position: Striker

Team information
- Current team: Getafe
- Number: 9

Youth career
- 2004–2007: Parla
- 2007–2015: Real Madrid

Senior career*
Years	Team	Apps	(Gls)
2014–2016	Real Madrid B	38	(17)
2015–2022	Real Madrid	22	(3)
2016–2017	→ VfL Wolfsburg (loan)	19	(2)
2018–2020	→ Levante (loan)	63	(11)
2020–2022	→ Roma (loan)	36	(10)
2022	→ Getafe (loan)	18	(6)
2022–	Getafe	102	(32)

International career
2013	Spain U17	1	(1)
2014–2016	Spain U19	16	(12)
2015–2019	Spain U21	31	(16)
Medal record
Men's football
Representing Spain
UEFA European Under-21 Championship
Winner	2019 Italy	Team
Runner-up	2017 Poland	Team
UEFA European Under-19 Championship
Winner	2015 Greece	Team
- * Club domestic league appearances and goals as of 27 May 2026

Borja Mayoral Moya (born 5 April 1997) is a Spanish professional footballer who plays as a striker for La Liga club Getafe.

Formed at Real Madrid from the age of 10, Mayoral made his first-team debut in 2015 after featuring for the reserves in Segunda División B. He was also loaned to Levante and Getafe in La Liga, VfL Wolfsburg in the Bundesliga, and Roma in Serie A.

Mayoral represented Spain up to under-21 level, earning 48 caps and scoring 29 goals. He was top scorer as the under-19 team won the 2015 European Championship, and was a 2017 runner-up and 2019 winner with the under-21 team.

== Club career ==
=== Real Madrid ===
Born in Parla in the Community of Madrid, Mayoral joined Real Madrid's youth setup in 2007, after starting out at his hometown club AD Parla. In 2014, he was included in the latter's Juvenil A squad, and also scored seven goals in the UEFA Youth League, including a hat-trick in a 6–0 group stage win over PFC Ludogorets Razgrad and the team's goal in their 1–1 draw with FC Porto Juniors in the last 16, being their only player to convert his opportunity in their penalty shootout exit.

On 18 January 2015, Mayoral made his senior debut for the reserves, coming on as a 74th-minute substitute for Álvaro Jiménez in a 1–0 Segunda División B win over Getafe CF B. As a half-time replacement for Cristian Benavente on 25 April, he scored his first goal for the team in a 2–2 draw with Sestao River Club at the Estadio Alfredo Di Stéfano.

Four days later, having amassed 43 goals for different teams over the season, Mayoral was an unused substitute in the main team's 3–0 La Liga home win over UD Almería. On 4 May, he scored twice in a 3–1 win over Celta de Vigo in the quarter-finals of the División de Honor Juvenil, and thirteen days later he concluded his reserve season by scoring the only goal in Castilla's win over CD Toledo. He was sent off on 27 June at the end of the 2–1 loss to Rayo Vallecano in the final of the 2015 Copa del Rey Juvenil at the Estadio Alfonso Murube in Ceuta, for attacking an opponent.

On 22 August 2015, Mayoral opened the 2015–16 season with a brace in a 5–1 home routing of CD Ebro. On 31 October he finally made his first team debut, replacing Toni Kroos in the last minutes of a 3–1 home success over UD Las Palmas. Returning to the reserves, on the following 16 January he scored his first senior hat-trick in a 4–0 home rout of CF Rayo Majadahonda.

On 2 March 2016, due to injury to Karim Benzema, manager Zinedine Zidane gave Mayoral his first start for Real Madrid against Levante UD; he took a shot that went in as an own goal by goalkeeper Diego Mariño in a 3–1 win at the Estadi Ciutat de València. On the last day of the reserves' season, he scored twice in a 6–1 win against La Roda CF, winning the group at Barakaldo CF's expense.

==== Loan to Wolfsburg ====
On 22 July 2016, Mayoral was loaned to Bundesliga team Wolfsburg for the upcoming season. He made his debut on 20 August in the first round of the DFB-Pokal, replacing goalscorer Bas Dost for the final seven minutes of a 2–1 win at FSV Frankfurt. On 16 October, he played his first league game for the Wolves, entering in the 77th minute in place of Luiz Gustavo in a 0–1 home loss to RB Leipzig, and scored his first goal on 3 December to open a 3–2 home loss to Hertha Berlin.

==== Return to Madrid ====
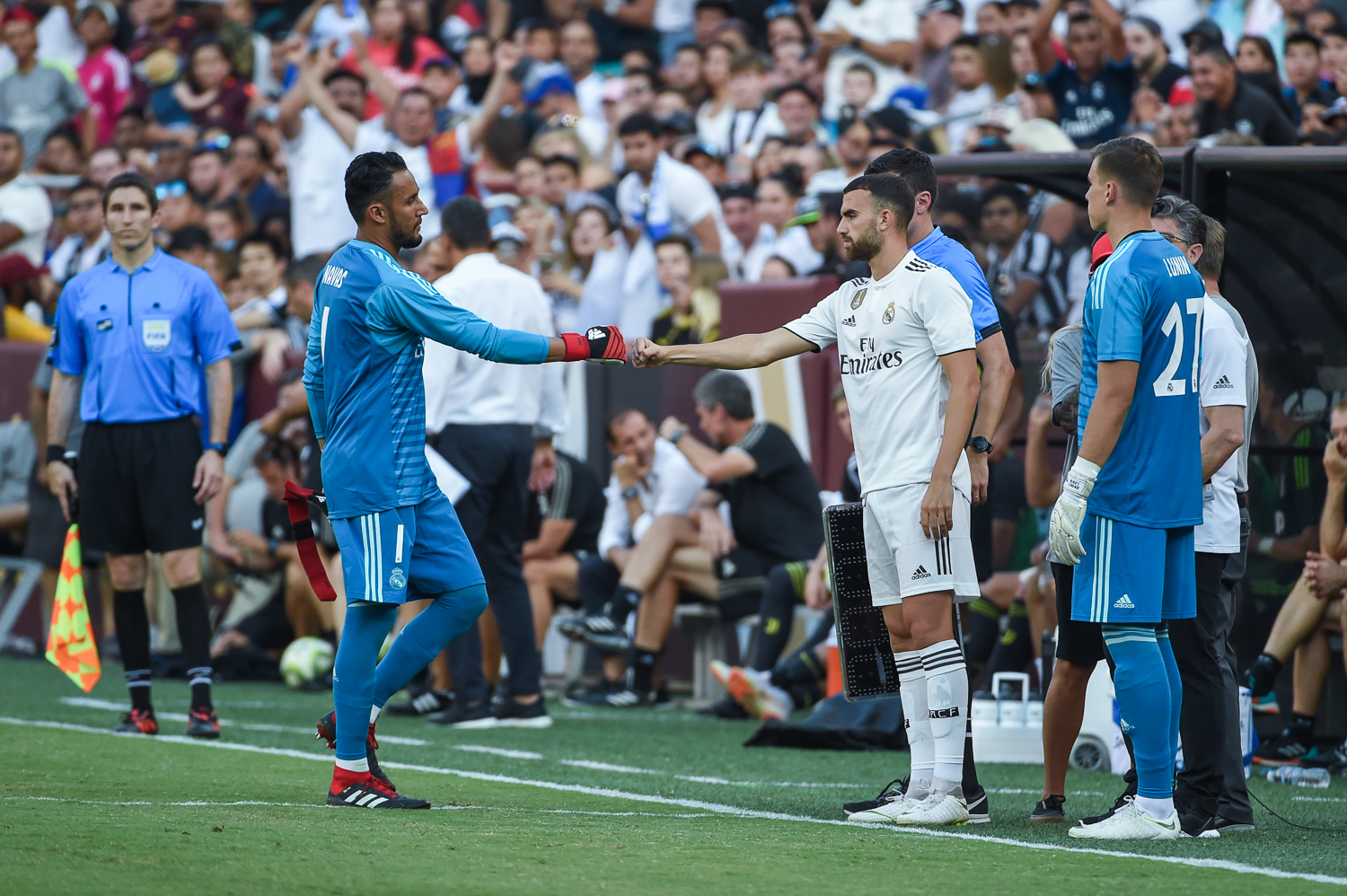
Mayoral (white kit) in a pre-season friendly in August 2018

In August, Mayoral was named Most Valuable Player of the 2017 Major League Soccer All-Star Game for scoring Real Madrid's goal in their penalty shootout victory at Soldier Field, Chicago.

Mayoral started his first game after his return to Madrid on 17 September 2017 away to Real Sociedad. He scored the team's opening goal, his first senior goal for Real Madrid. In December 2017, he was part of the squad that won the 2017 FIFA Club World Cup in the United Arab Emirates, but did not play. During the 2017–18 UEFA Champions League, he made four appearances, while scoring one goal, when Madrid won their third consecutive and 13th overall Champions League title.

==== Loan to Levante ====
On 31 August 2018, Mayoral was loaned to fellow top division side Levante for the season. He scored his first goal on 9 December in a 4–4 draw with Eibar.

The loan was extended for another season on 29 July 2019. He recorded his best La Liga figures of eight goals in 34 games in 2019–20, starting with a 3–2 loss at his parent club on 14 September and also including a 3–1 home win over leaders Barcelona on 2 November.

==== Loan to Roma ====
On 2 October 2020, Real Madrid loaned Mayoral to Roma until 30 June 2022. The loan fee was €2 million, with the option to buy for €15 million in the first year or €20 million in the second. He scored 10 goals in 31 games in his first Serie A season as they came 7th, including braces in home an away victories over Crotone and a 4–3 home victory over Spezia. He was joint top scorer with 7 goals in 13 appearances in the 2020–21 UEFA Europa League, including braces against Cluj in the group stage and Shakhtar Donetsk in the last 16.

In 2021–22, Mayoral played almost only as a substitute under new manager José Mourinho. He contributed one goal to their victorious run in the inaugural UEFA Europa Conference League, in a 3–2 dead rubber group win away to CSKA Sofia.

==== Loan to Getafe ====
On 13 January 2022, Mayoral returned to his home province, with La Liga team Getafe taking over the rest of his loan. He played all 18 remaining games of the season as the team moved away from relegation, scoring six times including three minutes into his debut in a 4–2 home win over Granada on 20 January, and both of a win at Celta Vigo on 20 April.

=== Getafe ===
On 1 August 2022, Mayoral permanently joined Getafe, signing a five-year contract. In the 2023–24 season, he became the top scorer for his club, as he also set a new personal best in La Liga by scoring 15 goals.

== International career ==
Mayoral scored in each of Spain's three qualification matches for the 2015 European Under-19 Championship: two in a 5–0 rout of Turkey and other goals in victories over rivals Portugal and hosts Georgia. At the finals in Greece, he finished as top scorer with three goals, including one in the 2–0 final win over Russia as Spain sealed a seventh title in the category, and made the Team of the Tournament.

On 7 October 2015, Mayoral made his debut for the under-21 team in a qualification match away to Georgia for the 2017 European Championship; he replaced Samu Castillejo with an hour played, and nine minutes later converted Saúl Ñíguez's assist in a 5–2 comeback victory. He scored a hat-trick away at Northern Ireland U21 in Group 2 of the following U21 Euros qualifying campaign.

== Style of play ==
ESPN writer Rob Train predicted in August 2015 that Mayoral could become the new Raúl, another forward produced at Real Madrid's academy. Richard Martin of UEFA.com described Mayoral as "an unapologetic scavenger". Zinedine Zidane complimented Mayoral as well, when he said, that "Mayoral's a striker who scores every time he has a shot".

Mayoral himself has cited Raúl and Karim Benzema as his inspirations.

== Personal life ==
Mayoral's older brother Cristian is also a footballer. An attacking midfielder, he was an Atlético Madrid youth graduate.

Mayoral was diagnosed with type 1 diabetes at the age of 4 after showing excessive thirst. In April 2020, he and fellow Spanish footballer Sergi Samper spoke of their isolation during the COVID-19 pandemic due to their condition. He and Real Madrid teammate Nacho were made honorary patrons of the DiabetesCERO charity, for which they auctioned their shirts from the 2017 Supercopa de España.

== Career statistics ==
=== Club ===
As of match played 2 March 2026

Appearances and goals by club, season and competition
Club	Season	League			National cup (Note: Includes Copa del Rey, DFB-Pokal, Coppa Italia)		Europe		Other		Total	
Club	Season	Division	Apps	Goals	Apps	Goals	Apps	Goals	Apps	Goals	Apps	Goals
Real Madrid B	2014–15	Segunda División B	5	2	—		—		—		5	2
Real Madrid B	2015–16	Segunda División B	33	15	—		—		—		33	15
Real Madrid B	Total		38	17	0	0	0	0	0	0	38	17
Real Madrid	2015–16	La Liga	6	0	0	0	0	0	—		6	0
Real Madrid	2017–18	La Liga	14	3	6	3	4 (Note: Appearances in UEFA Champions League)	1	0	0	24	7
Real Madrid	2018–19	La Liga	0	0	0	0	0	0	1 (Note: Appearance in UEFA Super Cup)	0	1	0
Real Madrid	2020–21	La Liga	2	0	0	0	0	0	0	0	2	0
Real Madrid	Total		22	3	6	3	4	1	1	0	33	7
VfL Wolfsburg (loan)	2016–17	Bundesliga	19	2	2	0	—		—		21	2
Levante (loan)	2018–19	La Liga	29	3	4	2	—		—		33	5
Levante (loan)	2019–20	La Liga	34	8	2	1	—		—		36	9
Levante (loan)	Total		63	11	6	3	0	0	0	0	69	14
Roma (loan)	2020–21	Serie A	31	10	1	0	13 (Note: Appearances in UEFA Europa League)	7	—		45	17
Roma (loan)	2021–22	Serie A	5	0	0	0	6 (Note: Appearances in UEFA Europa Conference League)	1	—		11	1
Roma (loan)	Total		36	10	1	0	19	8	0	0	56	18
Getafe (loan)	2021–22	La Liga	18	6	—		—		—		18	6
Getafe	2022–23	La Liga	35	8	3	1	—		—		38	9
Getafe	2023–24	La Liga	27	15	4	2	—		—		31	17
Getafe	2024–25	La Liga	24	5	3	1	—		—		27	6
Getafe	2025–26	La Liga	14	4	3	2	—		—		17	6
Getafe	Total		100	32	13	6	0	0	0	0	113	38
Career total			296	82	28	12	23	9	1	0	348	103

== Honours ==
Real Madrid

- UEFA Champions League: 2017–18
- FIFA Club World Cup:2017

Roma

- UEFA Europa Conference League: 2021–22

Spain U19

- UEFA European Under-19 Championship: 2015

Spain U21

- UEFA European Under-21 Championship: 2019; runner-up: 2017

Individual

- UEFA European Under-19 Championship top scorer: 2015
- UEFA Europa League top scorer: 2020–21 (joint – seven goals)
- Zarra Trophy: 2023–24
