= 2019 UEFA European Under-21 Championship qualification =

Championship qualification 2019 Under-21

Tournament details
- Dates: 25 March 2017 – 20 November 2018
- Teams: 54 (from 1 confederation)

Tournament statistics
- Matches played: 274
- Goals scored: 833 (3.04 per match)
- Top scorer: (Poland) Dawid Kownacki (11 goals)

The 2019 UEFA European Under-21 Championship qualifying competition was a men's under-21 football competition that determined the 11 teams joining the automatically qualified hosts Italy in the 2019 UEFA European Under-21 Championship final tournament (the other co-hosts San Marino would not qualify automatically).

Apart from Italy, all remaining 54 UEFA member national teams entered the qualifying competition, with Gibraltar and Kosovo making their debuts. Players born on or after 1 January 1996 are eligible to participate.

== Format ==
The qualifying competition consists of two rounds:

- Qualifying group stage: The 54 teams are drawn into nine groups of six teams. Each group is played in home-and-away round-robin format. The nine group winners qualify directly for the final tournament, while the four best runners-up (not counting results against the sixth-placed team) advance to the play-offs.
- Play-offs: The four teams are drawn into two ties to play home-and-away two-legged matches to determine the last two qualified teams.

=== Tiebreakers ===
In the qualifying group stage, teams are ranked according to points (3 points for a win, 1 point for a draw, 0 points for a loss), and if tied on points, the following tiebreaking criteria are applied, in the order given, to determine the rankings (Regulations Article 14.01):

1. Points in head-to-head matches among tied teams;
2. Goal difference in head-to-head matches among tied teams;
3. Goals scored in head-to-head matches among tied teams;
4. Away goals scored in head-to-head matches among tied teams;
5. If more than two teams are tied, and after applying all head-to-head criteria above, a subset of teams are still tied, all head-to-head criteria above are reapplied exclusively to this subset of teams;
6. Goal difference in all group matches;
7. Goals scored in all group matches;
8. Away goals scored in all group matches;
9. Disciplinary points (red card = 3 points, yellow card = 1 point, expulsion for two yellow cards in one match = 3 points);
10. UEFA coefficient for the qualifying group stage draw.

To determine the four best runners-up from the qualifying group stage, the results against the teams in sixth place are discarded. The following criteria are applied (Regulations Article 14.02):

1. Points;
2. Goal difference;
3. Goals scored;
4. Away goals scored;
5. Disciplinary points;
6. UEFA coefficient for the qualifying group stage draw.

In the play-offs, the team that scores more goals on aggregate over the two legs qualifies for the final tournament. If the aggregate score is level, the away goals rule is applied, i.e., the team that scores more goals away from home over the two legs advances. If away goals are also equal, extra time is played. The away goals rule is again applied after extra time, i.e., if there are goals scored during extra time and the aggregate score is still level, the visiting team advances by virtue of more away goals scored. If no goals are scored during extra time, the tie is decided by penalty shoot-out (Regulations Article 19.01).

== Schedule ==
The qualifying matches are played on dates that fall within the FIFA International Match Calendar.

| Stage | FIFA International Dates |
|---|---|
| Qualifying group stage | 20–28 March 2017 |
| Qualifying group stage | 5–13 June 2017 |
| Qualifying group stage | 28 August – 5 September 2017 |
| Qualifying group stage | 2–10 October 2017 |
| Qualifying group stage | 6–14 November 2017 |
| Qualifying group stage | 19–27 March 2018 |
| Qualifying group stage | 3–11 September 2018 |
| Qualifying group stage | 8–16 October 2018 |
| Play-offs | 12–20 November 2018 |

== Qualifying group stage ==
=== Draw ===
The draw for the qualifying group stage was held on 26 January 2017, 09:00 CET (UTC+1), at the UEFA headquarters in Nyon, Switzerland.

The teams were seeded according to their coefficient ranking, calculated based on the following:

- 2013 UEFA European Under-21 Championship final tournament and qualifying competition (20%)
- 2015 UEFA European Under-21 Championship final tournament and qualifying competition (40%)
- 2017 UEFA European Under-21 Championship qualifying competition (40%)

Each group contained one team from each of Pots A–F. For political reasons, Spain and Gibraltar, Serbia and Kosovo, and Bosnia and Herzegovina and Kosovo would not be drawn in the same group.

Final tournament hosts
| Team | Coeff | Rank |
|---|---|---|
| **Italy** | 35,546 | 6 |

Teams entering qualifying group stage

Pot A
| Team | Coeff | Rank |
|---|---|---|
| **Germany** | 39,037 | 1 |
| Portugal | 38,378 | 2 |
| **England** | 36,621 | 3 |
| **Spain** | 36,536 | 4 |
| **Denmark** | 35,590 | 5 |
| **France** | 34,262 | 7 |
| Sweden | 34,259 | 8 |
| Czech Republic | 33,690 | 9 |
| **Serbia** | 31,060 | 10 |

Pot D
| Team | Coeff | Rank |
|---|---|---|
| Wales | 23,683 | 29 |
| Bulgaria | 23,309 | 30 |
| Macedonia | 23,283 | 31 |
| Georgia | 22,402 | 32 |
| Hungary | 22,349 | 33 |
| Republic of Ireland | 22,004 | 34 |
| Scotland | 21,784 | 35 |
| Moldova | 20,696 | 36 |
| Albania | 18,584 | 37 |

Pot B
| Team | Coeff | Rank |
|---|---|---|
| Slovakia | 31,057 | 11 |
| Israel | 30,786 | 12 |
| Netherlands | 29,817 | 13 |
| **Austria** | 29,406 | 14 |
| **Croatia** | 28,239 | 15 |
| **Belgium** | 28,237 | 16 |
| **Poland** | 28,102 | 17 |
| Switzerland | 27,882 | 18 |
| Slovenia | 27,372 | 19 |

Pot E
| Team | Coeff | Rank |
|---|---|---|
| Lithuania | 18,411 | 38 |
| Azerbaijan | 18,331 | 39 |
| Armenia | 18,126 | 40 |
| Bosnia and Herzegovina | 18,056 | 41 |
| Belarus | 17,741 | 42 |
| Kazakhstan | 16,826 | 43 |
| Cyprus | 16,636 | 44 |
| Latvia | 16,516 | 45 |
| Estonia | 14,498 | 46 |

Pot C
| Team | Coeff | Rank |
|---|---|---|
| Ukraine | 27,372 | 20 |
| Norway | 26,830 | 21 |
| Russia | 26,414 | 22 |
| Turkey | 25,927 | 23 |
| **Romania** | 25,859 | 24 |
| Iceland | 25,679 | 25 |
| Greece | 25,522 | 26 |
| Montenegro | 24,791 | 27 |
| Finland | 24,581 | 28 |

Pot F
| Team | Coeff | Rank |
|---|---|---|
| Malta | 14,331 | 47 |
| Luxembourg | 12,878 | 48 |
| Northern Ireland | 12,611 | 49 |
| Faroe Islands | 12,113 | 50 |
| San Marino | 10,740 | 51 |
| Andorra | 10,045 | 52 |
| Liechtenstein | 8,058 | 53 |
| Gibraltar | 0 | 54 |
| Kosovo | 0 | 55 |

Notes

- Teams marked in **bold** qualified for the final tournament.

=== Groups ===
The nine group winners qualify directly for the final tournament.
The four best group runners-up (not counting results against sixth-placed team) advance to the play-offs.

==== Group 1 ====
| Pos | Team | Pld | W | D | L | GF | GA | GD | Pts | Qualification | Croatia | Greece | Czech Republic | Belarus | Moldova | San Marino |
|---|---|---|---|---|---|---|---|---|---|---|---|---|---|---|---|---|
| 1 | Croatia | 10 | 8 | 1 | 1 | 31 | 5 | +26 | 25 (Note: Head-to-head results: Greece 1–1 Croatia, Croatia 2–0 Greece.) | Final tournament | — | 2–0 | 5–1 | 2–1 | 4–0 | 5–0 |
| 2 | Greece | 10 | 8 | 1 | 1 | 26 | 5 | +21 | 25 | Play-offs | 1–1 | — | 3–0 | 2–0 | 5–1 | 4–0 |
| 3 | Czech Republic | 10 | 5 | 1 | 4 | 14 | 15 | −1 | 16 | | 2–1 | 1–2 | — | 1–1 | 1–0 | 3–1 |
| 4 | Belarus | 10 | 4 | 2 | 4 | 11 | 14 | −3 | 14 | | 0–4 | 0–2 | 1–0 | — | 3–1 | 1–0 |
| 5 | Moldova | 10 | 2 | 1 | 7 | 8 | 23 | −15 | 7 | | 0–3 | 0–2 | 1–3 | 2–2 | — | 1–0 |
| 6 | San Marino | 10 | 0 | 0 | 10 | 1 | 29 | −28 | 0 | | 0–4 | 0–5 | 0–2 | 0–2 | 0–2 | — |

Source: UEFA

==== Group 2 ====
| Pos | Team | Pld | W | D | L | GF | GA | GD | Pts | Qualification | Spain | | Slovakia | Iceland | Albania | Estonia |
|---|---|---|---|---|---|---|---|---|---|---|---|---|---|---|---|---|
| 1 | Spain | 10 | 9 | 0 | 1 | 31 | 10 | +21 | 27 | Final tournament | — | 1–2 | 5–1 | 1–0 | 3–0 | 3–1 |
| 2 | Northern Ireland | 10 | 6 | 2 | 2 | 15 | 11 | +4 | 20 | | 3–5 | — | 1–0 | 0–0 | 1–0 | 4–2 |
| 3 | Slovakia | 10 | 6 | 0 | 4 | 17 | 18 | −1 | 18 | | 1–4 | 1–0 | — | 0–2 | 4–1 | 2–0 |
| 4 | Iceland | 10 | 3 | 2 | 5 | 16 | 19 | −3 | 11 | | 2–7 | 0–1 | 2–3 | — | 2–3 | 5–2 |
| 5 | Albania | 10 | 1 | 4 | 5 | 9 | 17 | −8 | 7 | | 0–1 | 1–1 | 2–3 | 0–0 | — | 0–0 |
| 6 | Estonia | 10 | 0 | 2 | 8 | 11 | 24 | −13 | 2 | | 0–1 | 1–2 | 1–2 | 2–3 | 2–2 | — |

Source: UEFA

==== Group 3 ====
| Pos | Team | Pld | W | D | L | GF | GA | GD | Pts | Qualification | Denmark | Poland | Georgia | Finland | Lithuania | Faroe Islands |
|---|---|---|---|---|---|---|---|---|---|---|---|---|---|---|---|---|
| 1 | Denmark | 10 | 7 | 2 | 1 | 30 | 8 | +22 | 23 | Final tournament | — | 1–1 | 5–2 | 2–0 | 6–0 | 3–0 |
| 2 | Poland | 10 | 6 | 4 | 0 | 22 | 9 | +13 | 22 | Play-offs | 3–1 | — | 3–0 | 3–3 | 1–0 | 1–1 |
| 3 | Georgia | 10 | 3 | 3 | 4 | 11 | 19 | −8 | 12 | | 2–2 | 0–3 | — | 2–2 | 1–0 | 1–0 |
| 4 | Finland | 10 | 2 | 3 | 5 | 13 | 21 | −8 | 9 | | 0–5 | 1–3 | 1–2 | — | 0–2 | 1–1 |
| 5 | Lithuania | 10 | 2 | 2 | 6 | 7 | 16 | −9 | 8 | | 0–2 | 0–2 | 0–0 | 0–2 | — | 3–0 |
| 6 | Faroe Islands | 10 | 1 | 4 | 5 | 10 | 20 | −10 | 7 | | 0–3 | 2–2 | 3–1 | 1–3 | 2–2 | — |

Source: UEFA

==== Group 4 ====
| Pos | Team | Pld | W | D | L | GF | GA | GD | Pts | Qualification | England | Netherlands | Ukraine | Scotland | Latvia | Andorra |
|---|---|---|---|---|---|---|---|---|---|---|---|---|---|---|---|---|
| 1 | England | 10 | 8 | 2 | 0 | 23 | 4 | +19 | 26 | Final tournament | — | 0–0 | 2–1 | 3–1 | 3–0 | 7–0 |
| 2 | Netherlands | 10 | 5 | 3 | 2 | 21 | 6 | +15 | 18 | | 1–1 | — | 3–0 | 1–2 | 3–0 | 8–0 |
| 3 | Ukraine | 10 | 5 | 2 | 3 | 18 | 12 | +6 | 17 | | 0–2 | 1–1 | — | 3–1 | 3–2 | 1–0 |
| 4 | Scotland | 10 | 4 | 2 | 4 | 13 | 13 | 0 | 14 | | 0–2 | 2–0 | 0–2 | — | 1–1 | 3–0 |
| 5 | Latvia | 10 | 0 | 4 | 6 | 5 | 18 | −13 | 4 | | 1–2 | 0–3 | 1–1 | 0–2 | — | 0–0 |
| 6 | Andorra | 10 | 0 | 3 | 7 | 1 | 28 | −27 | 3 | | 0–1 | 0–1 | 0–6 | 1–1 | 0–0 | — |

Source: UEFA

==== Group 5 ====
| Pos | Team | Pld | W | D | L | GF | GA | GD | Pts | Qualification | Germany | Norway | Ireland | Israel | Kosovo | Azerbaijan |
|---|---|---|---|---|---|---|---|---|---|---|---|---|---|---|---|---|
| 1 | Germany | 10 | 8 | 1 | 1 | 33 | 7 | +26 | 25 | Final tournament | — | 2–1 | 2–0 | 3–0 | 1–0 | 6–1 |
| 2 | Norway | 10 | 4 | 3 | 3 | 15 | 13 | +2 | 15 | | 3–1 | — | 2–1 | 0–0 | 0–3 (Note: The Norway v Kosovo match originally ended with a 5–0 win for Norway, but was later awarded as a 0–3 win for Kosovo, after UEFA concluded that Norway had played Kristoffer Ajer in this match, who was ineligible after being suspended due to cards in his U-19 tournament match.) | 1–1 |
| 3 | Republic of Ireland | 10 | 4 | 2 | 4 | 12 | 15 | −3 | 14 (Note: Head-to-head results: Republic of Ireland 4–0 Israel, Israel 3–1 Republic of Ireland.) | | 0–6 | 0–0 | — | 4–0 | 1–0 | 1–0 |
| 4 | Israel | 10 | 4 | 2 | 4 | 17 | 18 | −1 | 14 | | 2–5 | 1–3 | 3–1 | — | 3–0 | 3–1 |
| 5 | Kosovo | 10 | 3 | 3 | 4 | 9 | 12 | −3 | 12 | | 0–0 | 3–2 | 1–1 | 0–4 | — | 2–0 |
| 6 | Azerbaijan | 10 | 0 | 3 | 7 | 6 | 27 | −21 | 3 | | 0–7 | 1–3 | 1–3 | 1–1 | 0–0 | — |

Source: UEFA

==== Group 6 ====
| Pos | Team | Pld | W | D | L | GF | GA | GD | Pts | Qualification | Belgium | Sweden | Turkey | Hungary | Cyprus | Malta |
|---|---|---|---|---|---|---|---|---|---|---|---|---|---|---|---|---|
| 1 | Belgium | 10 | 8 | 2 | 0 | 23 | 5 | +18 | 26 | Final tournament | — | 1–1 | 0–0 | 3–0 | 3–2 | 2–1 |
| 2 | Sweden | 10 | 6 | 2 | 2 | 19 | 8 | +11 | 20 | | 0–3 | — | 0–1 | 1–0 | 4–1 | 3–0 |
| 3 | Turkey | 10 | 5 | 2 | 3 | 14 | 10 | +4 | 17 | | 1–2 | 0–3 | — | 0–0 | 4–0 | 4–2 |
| 4 | Hungary | 10 | 3 | 2 | 5 | 12 | 14 | −2 | 11 | | 0–3 | 2–2 | 1–2 | — | 4–0 | 2–1 |
| 5 | Cyprus | 10 | 2 | 1 | 7 | 8 | 23 | −15 | 7 | | 0–2 | 0–1 | 2–1 | 0–2 | — | 2–1 |
| 6 | Malta | 10 | 1 | 1 | 8 | 8 | 24 | −16 | 4 | | 0–4 | 0–4 | 0–1 | 2–1 | 1–1 | — |

Source: UEFA

==== Group 7 ====
| Pos | Team | Pld | W | D | L | GF | GA | GD | Pts | Qualification | Serbia | Austria | Russia | Armenia | North Macedonia | Gibraltar |
|---|---|---|---|---|---|---|---|---|---|---|---|---|---|---|---|---|
| 1 | Serbia | 10 | 8 | 2 | 0 | 23 | 5 | +18 | 26 | Final tournament | — | 0–0 | 3–2 | 0–0 | 2–1 | 4–0 |
| 2 | Austria | 10 | 7 | 1 | 2 | 25 | 7 | +18 | 22 | Play-offs | 1–3 | — | 3–2 | 2–1 | 2–0 | 3–0 |
| 3 | Russia | 10 | 6 | 1 | 3 | 25 | 13 | +12 | 19 | | 1–2 | 1–0 | — | 0–0 | 5–1 | 3–0 |
| 4 | Armenia | 10 | 2 | 3 | 5 | 9 | 16 | −7 | 9 | | 0–1 | 0–5 | 1–2 | — | 0–3 | 1–0 |
| 5 | Macedonia | 10 | 2 | 1 | 7 | 17 | 24 | −7 | 7 | | 0–2 | 0–4 | 3–4 | 3–3 | — | 6–1 |
| 6 | Gibraltar | 10 | 1 | 0 | 9 | 2 | 36 | −34 | 3 | | 0–6 | 0–5 | 0–5 | 0–3 | 1–0 | — |

Source: UEFA

==== Group 8 ====
| Pos | Team | Pld | W | D | L | GF | GA | GD | Pts | Qualification | Romania | Portugal | Bosnia and Herzegovina | Wales | Switzerland | Liechtenstein |
|---|---|---|---|---|---|---|---|---|---|---|---|---|---|---|---|---|
| 1 | Romania | 10 | 7 | 3 | 0 | 19 | 4 | +15 | 24 | Final tournament | — | 1–1 | 2–0 | 2–0 | 1–1 | 4–0 |
| 2 | Portugal | 10 | 7 | 1 | 2 | 33 | 11 | +22 | 22 | Play-offs | 1–2 | — | 4–2 | 2–0 | 2–1 | 7–0 |
| 3 | Bosnia and Herzegovina | 10 | 6 | 0 | 4 | 24 | 11 | +13 | 18 | | 1–3 | 3–1 | — | 1–0 | 3–0 | 6–0 |
| 4 | Wales | 10 | 4 | 1 | 5 | 11 | 14 | −3 | 13 | | 0–0 | 0–2 | 0–4 | — | 3–1 | 2–1 |
| 5 | Switzerland | 10 | 3 | 1 | 6 | 11 | 18 | −7 | 10 | | 0–2 | 2–4 | 1–0 | 0–3 | — | 3–0 |
| 6 | Liechtenstein | 10 | 0 | 0 | 10 | 2 | 42 | −40 | 0 | | 0–2 | 0–9 | 0–4 | 1–3 | 0–2 | — |

Source: UEFA

==== Group 9 ====
| Pos | Team | Pld | W | D | L | GF | GA | GD | Pts | Qualification | France | Slovenia | Montenegro | Kazakhstan | Bulgaria | Luxembourg |
|---|---|---|---|---|---|---|---|---|---|---|---|---|---|---|---|---|
| 1 | France | 10 | 9 | 1 | 0 | 24 | 6 | +18 | 28 | Final tournament | — | 1–1 | 2–1 | 4–1 | 3–0 | 2–0 |
| 2 | Slovenia | 10 | 4 | 4 | 2 | 14 | 12 | +2 | 16 | | 1–3 | — | 2–0 | 2–1 | 1–1 | 3–1 |
| 3 | Montenegro | 10 | 3 | 2 | 5 | 15 | 15 | 0 | 11 | | 0–2 | 1–3 | — | 5–1 | 0–0 | 3–0 |
| 4 | Kazakhstan | 10 | 2 | 4 | 4 | 13 | 18 | −5 | 10 (Note: Head-to-head results: Bulgaria 2–2 Kazakhstan, Kazakhstan 1–1 Bulgaria (Kazakhstan won on away goals).) | | 0–3 | 0–0 | 1–1 | — | 1–1 | 3–0 |
| 5 | Bulgaria | 10 | 2 | 4 | 4 | 10 | 11 | −1 | 10 | | 0–1 | 3–0 | 3–1 | 2–2 | — | 0–1 |
| 6 | Luxembourg | 10 | 2 | 1 | 7 | 7 | 21 | −14 | 7 | | 2–3 | 1–1 | 1–3 | 0–3 (Note: The Luxembourg v Kazakhstan originally ended with a 1–2 win for Kazakhstan, but was later awarded as a 0–3 win for Kazakhstan, after UEFA concluded that Luxembourg had played an ineligible player.) | 1–0 | — |

Source: UEFA

=== Ranking of second-placed teams ===
To determine the four best second-placed teams from the qualifying group stage which advance to the play-offs, only the results of the second-placed teams against the first, third, fourth and fifth-placed teams in their group are taken into account, while results against the sixth-placed team are not included. As a result, eight matches played by each second-placed team will count for the purposes of determining the ranking.

| Pos | Grp | Team | Pld | W | D | L | GF | GA | GD | Pts | Qualification |
|---|---|---|---|---|---|---|---|---|---|---|---|
| 1 | 3 | Poland | 8 | 6 | 2 | 0 | 19 | 6 | +13 | 20 | Play-offs |
| 2 | 1 | Greece | 8 | 6 | 1 | 1 | 17 | 5 | +12 | 19 | Play-offs |
| 3 | 7 | Austria | 8 | 5 | 1 | 2 | 17 | 7 | +10 | 16 | Play-offs |
| 4 | 8 | Portugal | 8 | 5 | 1 | 2 | 17 | 11 | +6 | 16 | Play-offs |
| 5 | 6 | Sweden | 8 | 4 | 2 | 2 | 12 | 8 | +4 | 14 | |
| 6 | 2 | Northern Ireland | 8 | 4 | 2 | 2 | 9 | 8 | +1 | 14 | |
| 7 | 4 | Netherlands | 8 | 3 | 3 | 2 | 12 | 6 | +6 | 12 | |
| 8 | 9 | Slovenia | 8 | 3 | 3 | 2 | 10 | 10 | 0 | 12 | |
| 9 | 5 | Norway | 8 | 3 | 2 | 3 | 11 | 11 | 0 | 11 | |

Source: UEFA
Rules for classification: 1) points; 2) goal difference; 3) goals scored; 4) away goals scored; 5) disciplinary points; 6) coefficient.

== Play-offs ==
=== Draw ===
The draw for the play-offs was held on 19 October 2018, 13:00 CEST, at the UEFA headquarters in Nyon, Switzerland. The four teams were drawn into two ties of home-and-away two-legged format.

=== Matches ===
The two play-off winners qualify for the final tournament.

| Team 1 | Agg. | Team 2 | 1st leg | 2nd leg |
|---|---|---|---|---|
| Greece | 0–2 | Austria | 0–1 | 0–1 |
| Poland | 3–2 | Portugal | 0–1 | 3–1 |

== Qualified teams ==
The following 12 teams qualify for the final tournament.

| Team | Qualified as | Qualified on | Previous appearances in Under-21 Euro^{1} only U-21 era (since 1978) |
|---|---|---|---|
| Italy | Hosts | 9 December 2016 | 19 (1978, 1980, 1982, 1984, 1986, 1988, 1990, **1992**, **1994**, **1996**, **2000**, 2002, **2004**, 2006, 2007, 2009, 2013, 2015, 2017) |
| Croatia | Group 1 winners | 15 October 2018 | 2 (2000, 2004) |
| Spain | Group 2 winners | 6 September 2018 | 13 (1982, 1984, **1986**, 1988, 1990, 1994, 1996, **1998**, 2000, 2009, **2011**, **2013**, 2017) |
| Denmark | Group 3 winners | 16 October 2018 | 7 (1978, 1986, 1992, 2006, 2011, 2015, 2017) |
| England | Group 4 winners | 11 October 2018 | 14 (1978, 1980, **1982**, **1984**, 1986, 1988, 2000, 2002, 2007, 2009, 2011, 2013, 2015, 2017) |
| Germany | Group 5 winners | 12 October 2018 | 11 (1982^{2}, 1990^{2}, 1992, 1996, 1998, 2004, 2006, **2009**, 2013, 2015, **2017**) |
| Belgium | Group 6 winners | 16 October 2018 | 2 (2002, 2007) |
| Serbia | Group 7 winners | 12 October 2018 | 10 (**1978**^{3}, 1980^{3}, 1984^{3}, 1990^{3}, 2004^{4}, 2006^{4}, 2007, 2009, 2015, 2017) |
| Romania | Group 8 winners | 16 October 2018 | 1 (1998) |
| France | Group 9 winners | 7 September 2018 | 8 (1982, 1984, 1986, **1988**, 1994, 1996, 2002, 2006) |
| Austria | Play-off winners | 20 November 2018 | 0 (debut) |
| Poland | Play-off winners | 20 November 2018 | 6 (1982, 1984, 1986, 1992, 1994, 2017) |

^{1} Bold indicates champions for that year. Italic indicates hosts for that year.
^{2} As West Germany
^{3} As Yugoslavia
^{4} As Serbia and Montenegro

== Top goalscorers ==
11 goals

- (Poland) Dawid Kownacki

8 goals

- (Denmark) Robert Skov
- (Spain) Borja Mayoral

7 goals

- (Belgium) Landry Dimata
- (Croatia) Josip Brekalo
- (France) Martin Terrier
- (Germany) Cedric Teuchert
- (Portugal) Diogo Gonçalves
- (Romania) George Puşcaş
- (Russia) Georgi Melkadze
- (Serbia) Luka Jović
- (Sweden) Carlos Strandberg

Source: UEFA.com

For full lists of goalscorers, see sections in each group:

- Group 1
- Group 2
- Group 3
- Group 4
- Group 5
- Group 6
- Group 7
- Group 8
- Group 9
- Play-offs
