= 2019 UEFA European Under-21 Championship qualification Group 3 =

Football tournament qualification stage

Group 3 of the 2019 UEFA European Under-21 Championship qualifying competition consisted of six teams: Denmark, Poland, Finland, Georgia, Lithuania and Faroe Islands. The composition of the nine groups in the qualifying group stage was decided by the draw held on 26 January 2017, with the teams seeded according to their coefficient ranking.

The group was played in home-and-away round-robin format between 8 June 2017 and 16 October 2018. The group winners qualified directly for the final tournament, while the runners-up advanced to the play-offs if they were one of the four best runners-up among all nine groups (not counting results against the sixth-placed team).

== Standings ==
Pos	Team	Pld	W	D	L	GF	GA	GD	Pts	Qualification	Denmark	Poland	Georgia	Finland	Lithuania	Faroe Islands
1	Denmark	10	7	2	1	30	8	+22	23	Final tournament	—	1–1	5–2	2–0	6–0	3–0
2	Poland	10	6	4	0	22	9	+13	22	Play-offs	3–1	—	3–0	3–3	1–0	1–1
3	Georgia	10	3	3	4	11	19	−8	12		2–2	0–3	—	2–2	1–0	1–0
4	Finland	10	2	3	5	13	21	−8	9		0–5	1–3	1–2	—	0–2	1–1
5	Lithuania	10	2	2	6	7	16	−9	8		0–2	0–2	0–0	0–2	—	3–0
6	Faroe Islands	10	1	4	5	10	20	−10	7		0–3	2–2	3–1	1–3	2–2	—

Source: UEFA
Rules for classification: Qualification tiebreakers

== Matches ==
Times are CET/CEST, (Note: CEST (UTC+2) for dates between 26 March and 28 October 2017 and between 25 March and 27 October 2018, and CET (UTC+1) for all other dates.) as listed by UEFA (local times, if different, are in parentheses).

8 June 2017
17:00 (18:00 EEST)

Lithuania	3–0	Faroe Islands
Romanovskij 28' (pen.); Janonis 80'; Baniulis 85'	Report

Telšiai Stadium, Telšiai
Referee: Keith Kennedy (Northern Ireland)

31 August 2017
17:00 (16:00 WEST)

Faroe Islands	0–3	Denmark
	Report	Ingvartsen 13'; Nissen 59'; Jensen 66'

Tórsvøllur, Tórshavn
Referee: Boris Marhefka (Slovakia)
1 September 2017
18:00 (20:00 GET)

Georgia	0–3	Poland
	Report	Kownacki 58' (pen.), 65'; Kapustka 71'

Tengiz Burjanadze Stadium, Gori
Referee: Fedayi San (Switzerland)

5 September 2017
18:00

Denmark	6–0	Lithuania
Nissen 28', 44', 87'; Skov 30', 55'; Ingvartsen 80'	Report

Aalborg Stadium, Aalborg
Referee: Aleksei Matyunin (Russia)
5 September 2017
18:00 (19:00 EEST)

Finland	1–1	Faroe Islands
Kairinen 56'	Report	M. Olsen 59'

Lahti Stadium, Lahti
Referee: Alain Durieux (Luxembourg)

6 October 2017
18:00

Denmark	5–2	Georgia
Ingvartsen 7', 50'; Duelund 21'; Bruun Larsen 60'; Skov 84'	Report	Mikeltadze 82', 85'

Aalborg Stadium, Aalborg
Referee: Dennis Higler (Netherlands)
6 October 2017
18:00

Poland	3–3	Finland
Kownacki 7', 71' (pen.); Tomczyk 68'	Report	Dahlström 8'; Kairinen 61'; F. Jensen 76'

Stadion Widzewa, Łódź
Referee: Nenad Djokić (Serbia)

10 October 2017
17:30 (18:30 EEST)

Finland	0–5	Denmark
	Report	Skov 20', 31', 58'; Duelund 62'; Ingvartsen 84'

Telia 5G -areena, Helsinki
Referee: Kevin Clancy (Scotland)
10 October 2017
18:00 (19:00 EEST)

Lithuania	0–2	Poland
	Report	Tomczyk 62'; Michalak 80'

Gargždai Stadium, Gargždai
Referee: Stavros Mantalos (Greece)
10 October 2017
18:30 (17:30 WEST)

Faroe Islands	3–1	Georgia
M. Olsen 22'; Thomsen 26'; Jacobsen 39'	Report	Jacobsen 29' (o.g.)

Tórsvøllur, Tórshavn
Referee: Farrugia Cann Trustin (Malta)

10 November 2017
17:00 (20:00 GET)

Georgia	2–2	Finland
Beridze 59'; Chanturia 86'	Report	Källman 9', 83'

Mikheil Meskhi Stadium, Tbilisi
Referee: Oleksandr Derdo (Ukraine)
10 November 2017
17:45 (16:45 WET)

Faroe Islands	2–2	Poland
M. Olsen 52' (pen.); Petersen 80'	Report	Kownacki 35' (pen.); Bartosz 90+4'

Tórsvøllur, Tórshavn
Referee: Ferenc Karakó (Hungary)

14 November 2017
16:00 (19:00 GET)

Georgia	1–0	Lithuania
Matulevičius 55' (o.g.)	Report

Mikheil Meskhi Stadium, Tbilisi
Referee: Laurent Kopriwa (Luxembourg)
14 November 2017
18:00

Poland	3–1	Denmark
Michalak 15'; Tomczyk 24'; Żurkowski 74'	Report	Laursen 90+1'

Stadion GOSiR, Gdynia
Referee: Jonathan Lardot (Belgium)

23 March 2018
16:00 (19:00 GET)

Georgia	1–0	Faroe Islands
Zarandia 47'	Report

Tengiz Burjanadze Stadium, Gori
Referee: Zaven Hovhannisyan (Armenia)
23 March 2018
17:00 (18:00 EET)

Lithuania	0–2	Finland
	Report	Kairinen 61'; Nissilä 72'

Gargždai Stadium, Gargždai
Referee: Zbynek Proske (Czech Republic)

27 March 2018
15:00 (17:00 GET)

Georgia	2–2	Denmark
Kharaishvili 31'; Mikeltadze 63'	Report	Skov 43'; Nissen 75'

Tengiz Burjanadze Stadium, Gori
Referee: Aleksandrs Anufrijevs (Latvia)
27 March 2018
18:00

Poland	1–0	Lithuania
Kownacki 78'	Report

Arena Lublin, Lublin
Referee: Bojan Nikolić (Serbia)

8 June 2018
18:00 (17:00 WEST)

Faroe Islands	1–3	Finland
Heinesen 45'	Report	Källman 78', 83'; Lappalainen 90+2'

Svangaskarð, Toftir
Referee: Tim Marshall (Northern Ireland)

7 September 2018
17:00 (18:00 EEST)

Lithuania	0–0	Georgia
	Report

Gargždai Stadium, Gargždai
Referee: Alexandru Tean (Moldova)
7 September 2018
18:00

Denmark	2–0	Finland
Duelund 25'; A. Olsen 90+4'	Report

Aalborg Stadium, Aalborg
Referee: Benoît Millot (France)
7 September 2018
18:00

Poland	1–1	Faroe Islands
Kownacki 72' (pen.)	Report	Thomsen 16'

Stadion Zagłębia Lubin, Lubin
Referee: Robert Hennessy (Republic of Ireland)

11 September 2018
17:30 (18:30 EEST)

Finland	1–3	Poland
Lappalainen 68'	Report	Wieteska 66', 74'; Kownacki 89' (pen.)

Telia 5G -areena, Helsinki
Referee: Stephan Klossner (Switzerland)
11 September 2018
18:00 (19:00 EEST)

Lithuania	0–2	Denmark
	Report	Abildgaard 44'; Skov 73'

Gargždai Stadium, Gargždai
Referee: Timotheos Christofi (Cyprus)

12 October 2018
17:30 (18:30 EEST)

Finland	1–2	Georgia
Lappalainen 19'	Report	Mikeltadze 75' (pen.); Bugridze 87'

OmaSP Stadion, Seinäjoki
Referee: Milovan Milacic (Montenegro)
12 October 2018
18:00

Denmark	1–1	Poland
Billing 40'	Report	Kownacki 43' (pen.)

Aalborg Stadium, Aalborg
Referee: Mete Kalkavan (Turkey)
12 October 2018
18:00 (17:00 WEST)

Faroe Islands	2–2	Lithuania
M. Olsen 26'; Andreasen 84'	Report	Utkus 13'; Lasickas 90+2' (pen.)

Tórsvøllur, Tórshavn
Referee: Rohit Saggi (Norway)

16 October 2018
18:00

Denmark	3–0	Faroe Islands
Bruun Larsen 45+2'; Duelund 51'; Christensen 90+1'	Report

Aalborg Stadium, Aalborg
Referee: Christopher Jaeger (Austria)
16 October 2018
18:00

Poland	3–0	Georgia
Mikeltadze 52' (o.g.); Michalak 74'; Kownacki 90'	Report

Stadion GOSiR, Gdynia
Referee: Arnold Hunter (Northern Ireland)
16 October 2018
18:00 (19:00 EEST)

Finland	0–2	Lithuania
	Report	Marazas 51'; Matulevičius 90+2'

Tehtaan kenttä, Valkeakoski
Referee: Ioannis Papadopoulos (Greece)

== Goalscorers ==
There were 93 goals scored in 30 matches, for an average of 3.1 goals per match.

10 goals

- (Poland) Dawid Kownacki

8 goals

- (Denmark) Robert Skov

5 goals

- (Denmark) Marcus Ingvartsen
- (Denmark) Rasmus Nissen

4 goals

- (Denmark) Mikkel Duelund
- (Faroe Islands) Meinhard Olsen
- (Finland) Benjamin Källman
- (Georgia (country)) Beka Mikeltadze

3 goals

- (Finland) Kaan Kairinen
- (Finland) Lassi Lappalainen
- (Poland) Konrad Michalak
- (Poland) Paweł Tomczyk

2 goals

- (Denmark) Jacob Bruun Larsen
- (Faroe Islands) Jákup Thomsen
- (Poland) Mateusz Wieteska

1 goal

- (Denmark) Oliver Abildgaard
- (Denmark) Philip Billing
- (Denmark) Magnus Christensen
- (Denmark) Mathias Jensen
- (Denmark) Nikolai Laursen
- (Denmark) Andreas Skov Olsen
- (Faroe Islands) Jákup Andreasen
- (Faroe Islands) Benjamin Heinesen
- (Faroe Islands) Teit Jacobsen
- (Faroe Islands) Bjarni Petersen
- (Finland) Sebastian Dahlström
- (Finland) Fredrik Jensen
- (Finland) Urho Nissilä
- (Georgia (country)) Giorgi Beridze
- (Georgia (country)) Irakli Bugridze
- (Georgia (country)) Roman Chanturia
- (Georgia (country)) Giorgi Kharaishvili
- (Georgia (country)) Luka Zarandia
- (Lithuania) Edvinas Baniulis
- (Lithuania) Klaidas Janonis
- (Lithuania) Justas Lasickas
- (Lithuania) Justinas Marazas
- (Lithuania) Giedrius Matulevičius
- (Lithuania) Daniel Romanovskij
- (Lithuania) Edgaras Utkus
- (Poland) Jakub Bartosz
- (Poland) Bartosz Kapustka
- (Poland) Szymon Żurkowski

1 own goal

- (Faroe Islands) Teit Jacobsen (against Georgia)
- (Georgia (country)) Beka Mikeltadze (against Poland)
- (Lithuania) Giedrius Matulevičius (against Georgia)
