= 2019 UEFA European Under-21 Championship qualification Group 6 =

Football tournament qualification stage

Group 6 of the 2019 UEFA European Under-21 Championship qualifying competition consisted of six teams: Sweden, Belgium, Turkey, Hungary, Cyprus, and Malta. The composition of the nine groups in the qualifying group stage was decided by the draw held on 26 January 2017, with the teams seeded according to their coefficient ranking.

The group was played in home-and-away round-robin format between 27 March 2017 and 16 October 2018. The group winners qualified directly for the final tournament, while the runners-up advanced to the play-offs if they were one of the four best runners-up among all nine groups (not counting results against the sixth-placed team).

== Standings ==
Pos	Team	Pld	W	D	L	GF	GA	GD	Pts	Qualification	Belgium	Sweden	Turkey	Hungary	Cyprus	Malta
1	Belgium	10	8	2	0	23	5	+18	26	Final tournament	—	1–1	0–0	3–0	3–2	2–1
2	Sweden	10	6	2	2	19	8	+11	20		0–3	—	0–1	1–0	4–1	3–0
3	Turkey	10	5	2	3	14	10	+4	17		1–2	0–3	—	0–0	4–0	4–2
4	Hungary	10	3	2	5	12	14	−2	11		0–3	2–2	1–2	—	4–0	2–1
5	Cyprus	10	2	1	7	8	23	−15	7		0–2	0–1	2–1	0–2	—	2–1
6	Malta	10	1	1	8	8	24	−16	4		0–4	0–4	0–1	2–1	1–1	—

Source: UEFA
Rules for classification: Qualification tiebreakers

== Matches ==
Times are CET/CEST, (Note: CEST (UTC+2) for dates between 26 March and 28 October 2017 and between 25 March and 27 October 2018, and CET (UTC+1) for all other dates.) as listed by UEFA (local times, if different, are in parentheses).

27 March 2017
20:00

Belgium	2–1	Malta
Mmaee 43'; Cools 54'	Report	Grech 69'

Den Dreef, Leuven
Referee: Rob Harvey (Republic of Ireland)

1 September 2017
18:00 (19:00 EEST)

Cyprus	2–1	Malta
Anastasiou 41'; Iosifidis 90+3'	Report	Borg 34'

AEK Arena, Larnaca
Referee: Stefan Apostolov (Bulgaria)

5 September 2017
17:00

Hungary	2–1	Malta
Bíró 16'; Lenzsér 90+1'	Report	Beerman 19'

Ménfői úti Stadion, Győr
Referee: Juri Frischer (Estonia)
5 September 2017
18:45

Sweden	4–1	Cyprus
Strandberg 3', 5', 38'; Rakip 90+1'	Report	Elia 90+3'

Falcon Alkoholfri Arena, Falkenberg
Referee: Omar Pashayev (Azerbaijan)
5 September 2017
20:00

Belgium	0–0	Turkey
	Report

Den Dreef, Leuven
Referee: Fabio Verissimo (Portugal)

5 October 2017
16:00 (17:00 EEST)

Cyprus	2–1	Turkey
Karo 53'; Soteriou 58'	Report	Çınar 41'

AEK Arena, Larnaca
Referee: Daniel Siebert (Germany)
6 October 2017
20:00

Belgium	1–1	Sweden
Vanlerberghe 30'	Report	Dagerstål 61'

Den Dreef, Leuven
Referee: Nikola Dabanović (Montenegro)

10 October 2017
16:00 (17:00 EEST)

Cyprus	0–2	Belgium
	Report	Lukebakio 51'; Bastien 90+3'

AEK Arena, Larnaca
Referee: Kirill Levnikov (Russia)
10 October 2017
17:00 (18:00 TRT)

Turkey	0–0	Hungary
	Report

Recep Tayyip Erdoğan Stadium, Istanbul
Referee: Kai Erik Steen (Norway)
10 October 2017
18:45

Sweden	3–0	Malta
Ssewankambo 31'; Strandberg 50', 70'	Report

Olympia, Helsingborg
Referee: Luis Teixeira (Portugal)

9 November 2017
20:00

Belgium	3–2	Cyprus
Mbenza 15'; Dimata 45+2'; Leya Iseka 90+2'	Report	Papageorgiou 49'; Frangos 75'

Den Dreef, Leuven
Referee: Enea Jorgji (Albania)
10 November 2017
15:00

Malta	0–1	Turkey
	Report	Kanatsızkuş 50'

Centenary Stadium, Ta' Qali
Referee: Alexandru Tean (Moldova)
10 November 2017
17:00

Hungary	2–2	Sweden
Bíró 16', 18'	Report	Engvall 44'; Larsson 85'

Szusza Ferenc stadion, Budapest
Referee: Adrien Jaccottet (Switzerland)

14 November 2017
15:00 (17:00 TRT)

Turkey	1–2	Belgium
Okutan 5'	Report	Demiral 45+2' (o.g.); Schrijvers 87'

Recep Tayyip Erdoğan Stadium, Istanbul
Referee: Tomasz Musiał (Poland)
14 November 2017
15:00 (16:00 EET)

Cyprus	0–2	Hungary
	Report	Sallói 50'; Haris 80'

AEK Arena, Larnaca
Referee: Horatiu Fesnic (Romania)

22 March 2018
20:00

Hungary	4–0	Cyprus
Bíró 8'; Szalai 23'; Kyriakou 49' (o.g.); Zsótér 75'	Report

Hidegkuti Nándor Stadion, Budapest
Referee: Rob Harvey (Republic of Ireland)
23 March 2018
15:00 (17:00 TRT)

Turkey	0–3	Sweden
	Report	Asoro 7', 83'; Ingelsson 40'

Bahçeşehir Okulları Stadium, Alanya
Referee: Dennis Higler (Netherlands)

26 March 2018
20:00

Belgium	3–0	Hungary
Schrijvers 19'; Lukebakio 64'; Dimata 72' (pen.)	Report

Den Dreef, Leuven
Referee: Erez Papir (Israel)
27 March 2018
14:00 (15:00 EEST)

Cyprus	0–1	Sweden
	Report	Brorsson 90+7'

AEK Arena, Larnaca
Referee: Fabio Verissimo (Portugal)
27 March 2018
16:00 (17:00 TRT)

Turkey	4–2	Malta
Çağlayan 12'; Toköz 17'; Hümmet 20'; Çınar 35'	Report	Nwoko 28', 49'

Bahçeşehir Okulları Stadium, Alanya
Referee: Omar Pashayev (Azerbaijan)

7 June 2018
17:30

Malta	0–4	Sweden
	Report	Andersson 4'; Strandberg 31', 60'; Rakip 80' (pen.)

Centenary Stadium, Ta' Qali
Referee: Peter Kjærsgaard-Andersen (Denmark)

7 September 2018
17:00

Malta	0–4	Belgium
	Report	Dimata 11'; Schrijvers 18'; Lukebakio 59'; Leya Iseka 69'

Centenary Stadium, Ta' Qali
Referee: Roomer Tarajev (Estonia)
7 September 2018
18:00 (19:00 TRT)

Turkey	4–0	Cyprus
Demirbağ 3'; Çınar 76', 81' (pen.); Hadjipaschalis 88' (o.g.)	Report

Recep Tayyip Erdoğan Stadium, Istanbul
Referee: Danilo Grujić (Serbia)
7 September 2018
18:30

Sweden	1–0	Hungary
Svanberg 26'	Report

Falcon Alkoholfri Arena, Falkenberg
Referee: Kevin Clancy (Scotland)

11 September 2018
18:00

Hungary	0–3	Belgium
	Report	Dimata 20', 73' (pen.); Schrijvers 86'

Szusza Ferenc Stadion, Budapest
Referee: Tiago Martins (Portugal)
11 September 2018
18:30

Sweden	0–1	Turkey
	Report	Kanatsızkuş 32'

Olympia, Helsingborg
Referee: Sergey Lapochkin (Russia)

12 October 2018
17:00

Malta	2–1	Hungary
Guillaumier 12'; Beerman 90+1'	Report	Szalai 49'

Centenary Stadium, Ta' Qali
Referee: Eldorjan Hamiti (Albania)

16 October 2018
17:00

Malta	1–1	Cyprus
Nwoko 90+2'	Report	Wheeler 35'

Centenary Stadium, Ta' Qali
Referee: Admir Šehović (Bosnia and Herzegovina)
16 October 2018
18:30

Sweden	0–3	Belgium
	Report	Dimata 29', 40'; Lukebakio 65'

Guldfågeln Arena, Kalmar
Referee: Frank Schneider (France)
16 October 2018
18:30

Hungary	1–2	Turkey
Vida 9'	Report	Hümmet 53'; Okutan 81'

Pancho Aréna, Felcsút
Referee: Duje Strukan (Croatia)

== Goalscorers ==
There were 84 goals scored in 30 matches, for an average of 2.8 goals per match.

7 goals

- (Belgium) Landry Dimata
- (Sweden) Carlos Strandberg

4 goals

- (Belgium) Dodi Lukebakio
- (Belgium) Siebe Schrijvers
- (Hungary) Bence Bíró
- (Turkey) Orkan Çınar

3 goals

- (Malta) Kyrian Nwoko

2 goals

- (Belgium) Aaron Leya Iseka
- (Hungary) Attila Szalai
- (Malta) Myles Beerman
- (Sweden) Joel Asoro
- (Sweden) Erdal Rakip
- (Turkey) Deniz Hümmet
- (Turkey) Kubilay Kanatsızkuş
- (Turkey) Melih Okutan

1 goal

- (Belgium) Samuel Bastien
- (Belgium) Dion Cools
- (Belgium) Isaac Mbenza
- (Belgium) Ryan Mmaee
- (Belgium) Jordi Vanlerberghe
- (Cyprus) Rafael Anastasiou
- (Cyprus) Marios Elia
- (Cyprus) Andreas Frangos
- (Cyprus) Theodoros Iosifidis
- (Cyprus) Antreas Karo
- (Cyprus) Giorgos Papageorgiou
- (Cyprus) Costas Soteriou
- (Cyprus) Christos Wheeler
- (Hungary) Attila Haris
- (Hungary) Bence Lenzsér
- (Hungary) Dániel Sallói
- (Hungary) Máté Vida
- (Hungary) Donát Zsótér
- (Malta) Jean Borg
- (Malta) Jake Grech
- (Malta) Matthew Guillaumier
- (Sweden) Joel Andersson
- (Sweden) Franz Brorsson
- (Sweden) Filip Dagerstål
- (Sweden) Gustav Engvall
- (Sweden) Svante Ingelsson
- (Sweden) Jordan Larsson
- (Sweden) Isak Ssewankambo
- (Sweden) Mattias Svanberg
- (Turkey) Oğulcan Çağlayan
- (Turkey) Adil Demirbağ
- (Turkey) Dorukhan Toköz

1 own goal

- (Cyprus) Leonidas Kyriakou (against Hungary)
- (Cyprus) Christos Hadjipaschalis (against Turkey)
- (Turkey) Merih Demiral (against Belgium)
