= 2019 UEFA European Under-21 Championship qualification Group 5 =

Football tournament qualification stage

Group 5 of the 2019 UEFA European Under-21 Championship qualifying competition consisted of six teams: Germany, Israel, Norway, Republic of Ireland, Azerbaijan, and Kosovo. The composition of the nine groups in the qualifying group stage was decided by the draw held on 26 January 2017, with the teams seeded according to their coefficient ranking.

The group was played in home-and-away round-robin format between 25 March 2017 and 16 October 2018. The group winners qualified directly for the final tournament, while the runners-up advanced to the play-offs if they were one of the four best runners-up among all nine groups (not counting results against the sixth-placed team).

== Standings ==
Pos	Team	Pld	W	D	L	GF	GA	GD	Pts	Qualification	Germany	Norway	Ireland	Israel	Kosovo	Azerbaijan
1	Germany	10	8	1	1	33	7	+26	25	Final tournament	—	2–1	2–0	3–0	1–0	6–1
2	Norway	10	4	3	3	15	13	+2	15		3–1	—	2–1	0–0	0–3 (Note: The Norway v Kosovo match originally ended with a 5–0 win for Norway, but was later awarded as a 0–3 win for Kosovo, after UEFA concluded that Norway had played Kristoffer Ajer in this match, who was ineligible after being suspended due to cards in his U-19 tournament match.)	1–1
3	Republic of Ireland	10	4	2	4	12	15	−3	14 (Note: Head-to-head results: Republic of Ireland 4–0 Israel, Israel 3–1 Republic of Ireland.)		0–6	0–0	—	4–0	1–0	1–0
4	Israel	10	4	2	4	17	18	−1	14		2–5	1–3	3–1	—	3–0	3–1
5	Kosovo	10	3	3	4	9	12	−3	12		0–0	3–2	1–1	0–4	—	2–0
6	Azerbaijan	10	0	3	7	6	27	−21	3		0–7	1–3	1–3	1–1	0–0	—

Source: UEFA
Rules for classification: Qualification tiebreakers

== Matches ==
Times are CET/CEST, (Note: CEST (UTC+2) for dates between 26 March and 28 October 2017 and between 25 March and 27 October 2018, and CET (UTC+1) for all other dates.) as listed by UEFA (local times, if different, are in parentheses).

25 March 2017
14:00 (13:00 GMT)

Republic of Ireland	1–0	Kosovo
Shodipo 56'	Report

Tallaght Stadium, Dublin
Referee: Peter Kjærsgaard-Andersen (Denmark)

12 June 2017
19:00

Norway	0–3 Awarded (Note: The Norway v Kosovo match originally ended with a 5–0 win for Norway, but was later awarded as a 0–3 win for Kosovo, after UEFA concluded that Norway had played Kristoffer Ajer in this match, who were ineligible after being suspended due to cards.)	Kosovo
Thorsby 3'; Ajer 23'; Risa 66'; Reitan 83'; Hanche-Olsen 87'	Report

Marienlyst Stadion, Drammen
Attendance: 2,871
Referee: Alex Troleis (Faroe Islands)

31 August 2017
18:30 (19:30 IDT)

Israel	3–1	Azerbaijan
Barshazki 12'; Peretz 38'; Plakuschenko 57'	Report	Jafarov 70'

Acre Municipal Stadium, Acre
Referee: Cătălin Gaman (Romania)
1 September 2017
19:00

Kosovo	3–2	Norway
Bytyqi 41', 87'; Hasani 42'	Report	Bjørdal 5'; Ødegaard 36'

Adem Jashari Olympic Stadium, Mitrovica
Referee: Fyodor Zammit (Malta)

5 September 2017
17:00 (19:00 AZT)

Azerbaijan	1–3	Republic of Ireland
Madatov 12'	Report	Manning 9', 37'; Grego-Cox 51'

Dalga Arena, Baku
Referee: Sándor Andó-Szabó (Hungary)
5 September 2017
19:00

Germany	1–0	Kosovo
M. Eggestein 45'	Report

Stadion an der Bremer Brücke, Osnabrück
Attendance: 5,331
Referee: Dumitri Muntean (Moldova)
5 September 2017
19:00

Norway	0–0	Israel
	Report

Marienlyst Stadion, Drammen
Referee: Thoroddur Hjaltalin (Iceland)

5 October 2017
20:45 (19:45 IST)

Republic of Ireland	0–0	Norway
	Report

Tallaght Stadium, Dublin
Referee: Luis Miguel Branco Godinho (Portugal)
6 October 2017
19:00

Germany	6–1	Azerbaijan
Ochs 8', 37'; Dahoud 34'; Krivotsyuk 53' (o.g.); Hartel 72'; Teuchert 83'	Report	Safarzade 86'

Stadion der Freundschaft, Cottbus
Attendance: 7,345
Referee: Vilhjalmur Thorarinsson (Iceland)

9 October 2017
16:30 (15:30 IST)

Republic of Ireland	4–0	Israel
Grego-Cox 1', 38' (pen.), 51'; Charsley 35'	Report

Tallaght Stadium, Dublin
Referee: Fedayi San (Switzerland)
10 October 2017
19:00

Norway	3–1	Germany
Thorsby 45', 71'; Ødegaard 56'	Report	Teuchert 31'

Marienlyst Stadion, Drammen
Attendance: 1,810
Referee: Ognjen Valjić (Bosnia and Herzegovina)

9 November 2017
15:00 (18:00 AZT)

Azerbaijan	0–7	Germany
	Report	Hartel 2', 46', 58'; Amiri 14'; Seydel 28'; Klostermann 60'; Öztunalı 84'

Dalga Arena, Baku
Attendance: 150
Referee: Daniyar Sakhi (Kazakhstan)
9 November 2017
19:00

Kosovo	0–4	Israel
	Report	Nachmias 15'; Weissman 44'; Dasa 58'; Cohen 90+2'

Adem Jashari Olympic Stadium, Mitrovica
Referee: Charalambos Kalogeropoulos (Greece)

14 November 2017
15:00 (18:00 AZT)

Azerbaijan	0–0	Kosovo
	Report

Dalga Arena, Baku
Referee: Roomer Tarajev (Estonia)
14 November 2017
18:30 (19:30 IST)

Israel	2–5	Germany
Barshazki 44'; Weissman 73'	Report	Dahoud 17'; Klostermann 54'; Seydel 79'; Baumgartl 82'; Neuhaus 90+1'

Ramat Gan Stadium, Ramat Gan
Attendance: 2,500
Referee: Rade Obrenovic (Slovenia)
14 November 2017
19:00

Norway	2–1	Republic of Ireland
Ødegaard 19'; Fossum 90+1'	Report	Mulraney 32'

Marienlyst Stadion, Drammen
Referee: Ville Nevalainen (Finland)

22 March 2018
19:00

Germany	3–0	Israel
Löwen 11'; Teuchert 26'; Öztunalı 88' (pen.)	Report

Eintracht-Stadion, Braunschweig
Attendance: 6,071
Referee: Mario Zebec (Croatia)
22 March 2018
19:00

Kosovo	2–0	Azerbaijan
Hasani 54'; Kolgeci 61'	Report

Adem Jashari Olympic Stadium, Mitrovica
Referee: Donald Robertson (Scotland)

27 March 2018
18:45 (19:45 IDT)

Israel	1–3	Norway
Hanche-Olsen 55' (o.g.)	Report	Espejord 5', 7' (pen.); Ryerson 31'

Ramat Gan Stadium, Ramat Gan
Referee: Manfredas Lukjancukas (Lithuania)
27 March 2018
18:45

Kosovo	0–0	Germany
	Report

Adem Jashari Olympic Stadium, Mitrovica
Attendance: 7,850
Referee: Sándor Andó-Szabó (Hungary)
27 March 2018
20:30 (19:30 IST)

Republic of Ireland	1–0	Azerbaijan
Donnellan 90+9'	Report

Tallaght Stadium, Dublin
Referee: Filip Glova (Slovakia)

6 September 2018
19:00 (21:00 AZT)

Azerbaijan	1–1	Israel
Dadashov 1'	Report	Weissman 30'

Dalga Arena, Baku
Referee: Trustin Farrugia Cann (Malta)
7 September 2018
19:00

Kosovo	1–1	Republic of Ireland
Hasani 64'	Report	Curtis 82'

Adem Jashari Olympic Stadium, Mitrovica
Referee: Petr Ardeleánu (Czech Republic)

11 September 2018
18:00 (20:00 AZT)

Azerbaijan	1–3	Norway
Ekinjier 56'	Report	Risa 48'; Thorsby 50', 76'

Dalga Arena, Baku
Referee: Barbeno Luca (San Marino)
11 September 2018
19:00 (18:00 IST)

Republic of Ireland	0–6	Germany
	Report	Seydel 6'; Teuchert 22' (pen.), 66', 73' (pen.); Serdar 83' (pen.), 86'

Tallaght Stadium, Dublin
Attendance: 2,325
Referee: Alejandro Hernandez (Spain)

11 October 2018
16:00 (17:00 IDT)

Israel	3–1	Republic of Ireland
Kanichowsky 15'; Plakuschenko 77'; Cohen 90+7'	Report	Hale 64'

Acre Municipal Stadium, Acre
Referee: Lawrence Visser (Belgium)
12 October 2018
20:00

Germany	2–1	Norway
Teuchert 21'; Waldschmidt 31'	Report	Risa 46'

Audi Sportpark, Ingolstadt
Referee: Kirill Levnikov (Russia)

16 October 2018
17:00 (18:00 IDT)

Israel	3–0	Kosovo
Ganem 10', 45+2'; Meir 72'	Report

Ramat Gan Stadium, Ramat Gan
Referee: Michal Ocenáš (Slovakia)
16 October 2018
18:15

Germany	2–0	Republic of Ireland
Serra 32'; Öztunalı 40'	Report

Voith-Arena, Heidenheim
Referee: Karim Abed (France)
16 October 2018
18:15

Norway	1–1	Azerbaijan
Østigård 76'	Report	Muradbayli 9' (pen.)

Marienlyst Stadion, Drammen
Referee: Volen Chinkov (Bulgaria)

== Goalscorers ==
There were 94 goals scored in 30 matches, for an average of 3.13 goals per match.

7 goals

- (Germany) Cedric Teuchert

5 goals

- (Norway) Morten Thorsby

4 goals

- (Germany) Marcel Hartel
- (Republic of Ireland) Reece Grego-Cox

3 goals

- (Germany) Levin Öztunalı
- (Germany) Aaron Seydel
- (Israel) Shon Weissman
- (Kosovo) Florent Hasani
- (Norway) Martin Ødegaard
- (Norway) Birk Risa

2 goals

- (Germany) Mahmoud Dahoud
- (Germany) Lukas Klostermann
- (Germany) Philipp Ochs
- (Germany) Suat Serdar
- (Israel) Moti Barshazki
- (Israel) Yonatan Cohen
- (Israel) Kayes Ganem
- (Israel) Maxim Plakuschenko
- (Kosovo) Enis Bytyqi
- (Norway) Runar Espejord
- (Republic of Ireland) Ryan Manning

1 goal

- (Azerbaijan) Renat Dadashov
- (Azerbaijan) Baris Ekinjier
- (Azerbaijan) Elnur Jafarov
- (Azerbaijan) Mahir Madatov
- (Azerbaijan) Fahmin Muradbayli
- (Azerbaijan) Ilyas Safarzade
- (Germany) Nadiem Amiri
- (Germany) Timo Baumgartl
- (Germany) Maximilian Eggestein
- (Germany) Eduard Löwen
- (Germany) Florian Neuhaus
- (Germany) Janni Serra
- (Germany) Luca Waldschmidt
- (Israel) Or Dasa
- (Israel) Gavriel Kanichowsky
- (Israel) Raz Meir
- (Israel) Idan Nachmias
- (Israel) Eliel Peretz
- (Kosovo) Besfort Kolgeci
- (Norway) Kristoffer Ajer
- (Norway) Henrik Bjørdal
- (Norway) Iver Fossum
- (Norway) Andreas Hanche-Olsen
- (Norway) Leo Skiri Østigård
- (Norway) Erlend Dahl Reitan
- (Norway) Julian Ryerson
- (Republic of Ireland) Henry Charsley
- (Republic of Ireland) Ronan Curtis
- (Republic of Ireland) Shaun Donnellan
- (Republic of Ireland) Ronan Hale
- (Republic of Ireland) Jake Mulraney
- (Republic of Ireland) Olamide Shodipo

1 own goal

- (Azerbaijan) Anton Krivotsyuk (against Germany)
- (Norway) Andreas Hanche-Olsen (against Israel)
