= 2019 UEFA European Under-21 Championship qualification Group 7 =

Football tournament qualification stage

Group 7 of the 2019 UEFA European Under-21 Championship qualifying competition consisted of six teams: Serbia, Austria, Russia, Macedonia, Armenia and Gibraltar. The composition of the nine groups in the qualifying group stage was decided by the draw held on 26 January 2017, with the teams seeded according to their coefficient ranking.

The group was played in home-and-away round-robin format between 8 June 2017 and 16 October 2018. The group winners qualified directly for the final tournament, while the runners-up advanced to the play-offs if they were one of the four best runners-up among all nine groups (not counting results against the sixth-placed team).

== Standings ==
Pos	Team	Pld	W	D	L	GF	GA	GD	Pts	Qualification	Serbia	Austria	Russia	Armenia	North Macedonia	Gibraltar
1	Serbia	10	8	2	0	23	5	+18	26	Final tournament	—	0–0	3–2	0–0	2–1	4–0
2	Austria	10	7	1	2	25	7	+18	22	Play-offs	1–3	—	3–2	2–1	2–0	3–0
3	Russia	10	6	1	3	25	13	+12	19		1–2	1–0	—	0–0	5–1	3–0
4	Armenia	10	2	3	5	9	16	−7	9		0–1	0–5	1–2	—	0–3	1–0
5	Macedonia	10	2	1	7	17	24	−7	7		0–2	0–4	3–4	3–3	—	6–1
6	Gibraltar	10	1	0	9	2	36	−34	3		0–6	0–5	0–5	0–3	1–0	—

Source: UEFA
Rules for classification: Qualification tiebreakers

== Matches ==
Times are CET/CEST, (Note: CEST (UTC+2) for dates between 26 March and 28 October 2017 and between 25 March and 27 October 2018, and CET (UTC+1) for all other dates.) as listed by UEFA (local times, if different, are in parentheses).

8 June 2017
20:30

Austria	3–0	Gibraltar
Friedl 6'; Horvath 60'; Prokop 90+5'	Report

Sonnenseestadion, Ritzing
Attendance: 300
Referee: Giorgi Kruashvili (Georgia)

13 June 2017
20:00 (19:00 WEST)

Gibraltar	0–3	Armenia
	Report	Petrosyan 9'; Arakelyan 74'; Avetisyan 85'

Estádio Algarve, Faro/Loulé (Portugal) (Note: Gibraltar played their first two home matches in Portugal.)
Attendance: 100
Referee: Duje Strukan (Croatia)

31 August 2017
18:00 (19:00 MSK)

Russia	0–0	Armenia
	Report

Lokomotiv Stadium, Moscow
Attendance: 1,750
Referee: Edin Jakupović (Bosnia and Herzegovina)
1 September 2017
18:00

Serbia	4–0	Gibraltar
Živković 19'; Pantić 28', 39'; Jović 45+2'	Report

Jagodina City Stadium, Jagodina
Attendance: 3,000
Referee: Iwan Arwel Griffith (Wales)

5 September 2017
17:00 (19:00 AMT)

Armenia	0–3	Macedonia
	Report	Kostadinov 8', 26', 72'

Yerevan Football Academy Stadium, Yerevan
Attendance: 1,100
Referee: Zbynek Proske (Czech Republic)
5 September 2017
18:00 (19:00 MSK)

Russia	3–0	Gibraltar
Zuyev 44'; Guliyev 71'; Chalov 89'	Report

Arsenal Stadium, Tula
Attendance: 8,260
Referee: Furkat Atazhanov (Kazakhstan)

2 October 2017
16:00 (18:00 AMT)

Armenia	1–0	Gibraltar
Avetisyan 54' (pen.)	Report

Yerevan Football Academy Stadium, Yerevan
Attendance: 300
Referee: Michal Ocenáš (Slovakia)

6 October 2017
14:00 (15:00 MSK)

Russia	1–0	Austria
Zhemaletdinov 27' (pen.)	Report

Oktyabr Stadium, Moscow
Attendance: 1,643
Referee: Mohammed Al-Hakim (Sweden)
6 October 2017
15:00

Macedonia	0–2	Serbia
	Report	Lukić 22'; Živković 37'

Training Centre Petar Miloševski, Skopje
Attendance: 800
Referee: François Letexier (France)

10 October 2017
16:00 (18:00 AMT)

Armenia	0–5	Austria
	Report	Kvasina 49', 81'; Schlager 60', 75'; Jakupović 78'

Yerevan Football Academy Stadium, Yerevan
Attendance: 800
Referee: Bryn Markham-Jones (Wales)
10 October 2017
17:00 (16:00 WEST)

Gibraltar	1–0	Macedonia
Torrilla 64'	Report

Estádio Algarve, Faro/Loulé (Portugal)
Attendance: 75
Referee: Manfredas Lukjancukas (Lithuania)
10 October 2017
18:00

Serbia	3–2	Russia
Pantić 14'; Jović 33', 60'	Report	Zhemaletdinov 26'; Melkadze 42'

Karađorđe Stadium, Novi Sad
Attendance: 1,685
Referee: Ádám Farkas (Hungary)

10 November 2017
12:00 (15:00 AMT)

Armenia	1–2	Russia
Yeghiazaryan 69'	Report	Bakayev 25'; Zuyev 48'

Yerevan Football Academy Stadium, Yerevan
Attendance: 250
Referee: Nikola Popov (Bulgaria)
10 November 2017
18:30

Austria	1–3	Serbia
Laimer 80'	Report	Lutovac 30'; Jović 87' (pen.); Ilić 90+1'

Bundesstadion Südstadt, Maria Enzersdorf
Attendance: 1,290
Referee: Aliyar Aghayev (Azerbaijan)

14 November 2017
12:00 (15:00 AMT)

Armenia	0–1	Serbia
	Report	Lutovac 53'

Yerevan Football Academy Stadium, Yerevan
Attendance: 500
Referee: Alan Mario Sant (Malta)
14 November 2017
13:00

Macedonia	0–4	Austria
	Report	Jakupović 12', 54'; Honsak 26'; Laimer 36'

Philip II Arena, Skopje
Attendance: 555
Referee: João Pinheiro (Portugal)

23 March 2018
14:00

Macedonia	3–4	Russia
Amanović 41' (pen.), 86'; Petkovski 64'	Report	Oblyakov 25'; Melkadze 37', 69'; Bakayev 90+4'

Training Centre Petar Miloševski, Skopje
Attendance: 250
Referee: Horatiu Fesnic (Romania)
23 March 2018
20:00

Gibraltar	0–6	Serbia
	Report	Lukić 15'; Jović 21', 61'; Gajić 41'; Lutovac 49'; Britto 82' (o.g.)

Victoria Stadium, Gibraltar
Attendance: 500
Referee: Juri Frischer (Estonia)

27 March 2018
18:00

Austria	2–0	Macedonia
Honsak 65', 73'	Report

Bundesstadion Südstadt, Maria Enzersdorf
Attendance: 800
Referee: Furkat Atazhanov (Kazakhstan)
27 March 2018
20:00

Gibraltar	0–5	Russia
	Report	Melkadze 39', 45+1', 69'; Barnett 64' (o.g.); Tugarev 81'

Victoria Stadium, Gibraltar
Attendance: 788
Referee: Vasilis Dimitriou (Cyprus)

7 September 2018
18:00

Serbia	2–1	Macedonia
Šaponjić 28' (pen.); Ranđelović 80'	Report	Kostadinov 64'

Karađorđe Stadium, Novi Sad
Attendance: 935
Referee: Dennis Higler (Netherlands)
7 September 2018
18:00

Austria	2–1	Armenia
Kvasina 3' (pen.); Ullmann 70'	Report	Bichakhchyan 61'

Sonnenseestadion, Ritzing
Attendance: 200
Referee: Sergey Ivanov (Russia)

11 September 2018
15:30

Macedonia	3–3	Armenia
Atanasov 26'; Zdravkovski 73' (pen.); Churlinov 89'	Report	Avetisyan 56' (pen.), 90+3'; Amanović 90' (o.g.)

Training Centre Petar Miloševski, Skopje
Attendance: 300
Referee: Alex Troleis (Faroe Islands)
11 September 2018
19:00 (20:00 MSK)

Russia	1–2	Serbia
Chernov 61'	Report	Jović 74' (pen.); Lutovac 88'

Nizhny Novgorod Stadium, Nizhny Novgorod
Attendance: 38,763
Referee: Massimiliano Irrati (Italy)
11 September 2018
20:00

Gibraltar	0–5	Austria
	Report	Honsak 24', 55', 80'; Ullmann 58'; Lienhart 74'

Victoria Stadium, Gibraltar
Attendance: 523
Referee: Luis Godinho (Portugal)

12 October 2018
18:00

Serbia	0–0	Austria
	Report

Karađorđe Stadium, Novi Sad
Attendance: 920
Referee: Stuart Attwell (England)
12 October 2018
18:00 (19:00 MSK)

Russia	5–1	Macedonia
Akhmetov 14'; Chalov 18'; Bakayev 43'; Oblyakov 67'; Melkadze 90+2'	Report	Krstovski 74'

Arsenal Stadium, Tula
Attendance: 11,349
Referee: Kristoffer Hagenes (Norway)

16 October 2018
14:30

Macedonia	6–1	Gibraltar
Rufati 10'; Mitrovski 33', 71', 73'; Zdravkovski 48'; Gjorgjev 66'	Report	Clinton 63'

Training Centre Petar Miloševski, Skopje
Attendance: 150
Referee: Christophe Pires (Luxembourg)
16 October 2018
18:00

Serbia	0–0	Armenia
	Report

Karađorđe Stadium, Novi Sad
Attendance: 510
Referee: Espen Eskås (Norway)
16 October 2018
18:00

Austria	3–2	Russia
Grbić 13'; Wolf 48'; Jakupović 75'	Report	Chalov 14', 52'

NV Arena, Sankt Pölten
Attendance: 1,002
Referee: Juri Frischer (Estonia)

== Goalscorers ==
There were 101 goals scored in 30 matches, for an average of 3.37 goals per match.

7 goals

- (Russia) Georgi Melkadze
- (Serbia) Luka Jović

6 goals

- (Austria) Mathias Honsak

4 goals

- (Armenia) Petros Avetisyan
- (Austria) Arnel Jakupović
- (North Macedonia) Tihomir Kostadinov
- (Russia) Fyodor Chalov
- (Serbia) Aleksandar Lutovac

3 goals

- (Austria) Marko Kvasina
- (North Macedonia) Dimitar Mitrovski
- (Russia) Zelimkhan Bakayev
- (Serbia) Danilo Pantić

2 goals

- (Austria) Konrad Laimer
- (Austria) Xaver Schlager
- (Austria) Maximilian Ullmann
- (North Macedonia) Aleksa Amanović
- (North Macedonia) Davor Zdravkovski
- (Russia) Ivan Oblyakov
- (Russia) Rifat Zhemaletdinov
- (Russia) Aleksandr Zuyev
- (Serbia) Saša Lukić
- (Serbia) Andrija Živković

1 goal

- (Armenia) Alik Arakelyan
- (Armenia) Vahan Bichakhchyan
- (Armenia) Narek Petrosyan
- (Armenia) Emil Yeghiazaryan
- (Austria) Marco Friedl
- (Austria) Adrian Grbić
- (Austria) Sascha Horvath
- (Austria) Philipp Lienhart
- (Austria) Dominik Prokop
- (Austria) Hannes Wolf
- (Gibraltar) Leon Clinton
- (Gibraltar) Graeme Torrilla
- (North Macedonia) Jani Atanasov
- (North Macedonia) Darko Churlinov
- (North Macedonia) Nikola Gjorgjev
- (North Macedonia) Mario Krstovski
- (North Macedonia) Petar Petkovski
- (North Macedonia) Agron Rufati
- (Russia) Ilzat Akhmetov
- (Russia) Nikita Chernov
- (Russia) Ayaz Guliyev
- (Russia) Roman Tugarev
- (Serbia) Milan Gajić
- (Serbia) Luka Ilić
- (Serbia) Lazar Ranđelović
- (Serbia) Ivan Šaponjić

1 own goal

- (Gibraltar) Erin Barnett (against Russia)
- (Gibraltar) Ethan Britto (against Serbia)
- (North Macedonia) Aleksa Amanović (against Armenia)
