= Melih Okutan =

Turkish footballer (born 1996)

Personal information
- Date of birth: 1 July 1996 (age 30)
- Place of birth: İzmit, Turkey
- Height: 1.77 m (5 ft 10 in)
- Position: Winger

Team information
- Current team: Kırklarelispor
- Number: 77

Youth career
- 2005–2008: Kocaelispor
- 2008–2014: Fenerbahçe

Senior career*
Years	Team	Apps	(Gls)
2014–2017	Fenerbahçe	1	(0)
2016–2017	→ Anadolu Bağcılar (loan)	33	(12)
2017–2021	Boluspor	85	(11)
2021	Kayserispor	11	(1)
2021–2023	Samsunspor	24	(2)
2022–2023	→ Boluspor (loan)	25	(1)
2023–2025	Ümraniyespor	31	(1)
2025–	Kırklarelispor	3	(0)

International career
2013–2014	Turkey U-18	10	(2)
2013–2015	Turkey U-19	15	(1)
2015	Turkey U-20	3	(0)
2017–2018	Turkey U-21	9	(2)
- * Club domestic league appearances and goals as of 12 October 2025

Melih Okutan (born 1 July 1996) is a Turkish football player who plays for TFF 2. Lig club Kırklarelispor as a winger.

== Club career ==
He made his Süper Lig debut for Fenerbahçe on 19 May 2016 in a game against Sivasspor.
