= 2019 UEFA European Under-21 Championship qualification play-offs =

The play-offs of the 2019 UEFA European Under-21 Championship qualifying competition involve the four runners-up with the best records among all nine groups in the qualifying group stage.

== Ranking of second-placed teams ==
To determine the four best second-placed teams from the qualifying group stage which advance to the play-offs, only the results of the second-placed teams against the first, third, fourth and fifth-placed teams in their group are taken into account, while results against the sixth-placed team are not included. As a result, eight matches played by each second-placed team will count for the purposes of determining the ranking.

Pos	Grp	Team	Pld	W	D	L	GF	GA	GD	Pts	Qualification
1	3	Poland	8	6	2	0	19	6	+13	20	Play-offs
2	1	Greece	8	6	1	1	17	5	+12	19	Play-offs
3	7	Austria	8	5	1	2	17	7	+10	16	Play-offs
4	8	Portugal	8	5	1	2	17	11	+6	16	Play-offs
5	6	Sweden	8	4	2	2	12	8	+4	14	
6	2	Northern Ireland	8	4	2	2	9	8	+1	14	
7	4	Netherlands	8	3	3	2	12	6	+6	12	
8	9	Slovenia	8	3	3	2	10	10	0	12	
9	5	Norway	8	3	2	3	11	11	0	11	

Source: UEFA
Rules for classification: 1) points; 2) goal difference; 3) goals scored; 4) away goals scored; 5) disciplinary points; 6) coefficient.

== Draw ==
The draw for the play-offs was held on 19 October 2018, 13:00 CEST, at the UEFA headquarters in Nyon, Switzerland. The four teams were drawn into two ties of home-and-away two-legged format.

== Matches ==
The two play-off winners qualify for the final tournament. All times are CET (UTC+1), as listed by UEFA (local times, if different, are in parentheses).

Team 1	Agg.	Team 2	1st leg	2nd leg
Greece	0–2	Austria	0–1	0–1
Poland	3–2	Portugal	0–1	3–1

16 November 2018
17:00 (18:00 EET)

Greece	0–1	Austria
	Report	Posch 84'

Toumba Stadium, Thessaloniki
Attendance: 2,800
Referee: Andris Treimanis (Latvia)
20 November 2018
19:00

Austria	1–0	Greece
Grbić 51'	Report

NV Arena, Sankt Pölten
Attendance: 2,861
Referee: Craig Pawson (England)

Austria won 2–0 on aggregate.

16 November 2018
18:00

Poland	0–1	Portugal
	Report	Jota 30'

Ernest Pohl Stadium, Zabrze
Attendance: 12,982
Referee: Georgi Kabakov (Bulgaria)
20 November 2018
18:00 (17:00 WET)

Portugal	1–3	Poland
Jota 52'	Report	Bielik 5'; Kownacki 8'; Szymański 24'

Estádio Municipal Eng. Manuel Branco Teixeira, Chaves
Attendance: 4,868
Referee: Davide Massa (Italy)

Poland won 3–2 on aggregate.

== Goalscorers ==
There were 7 goals scored in 4 matches, for an average of 1.75 goals per match.

2 goals

- (Portugal) Diogo Jota

1 goal

- (Austria) Adrian Grbić
- (Austria) Stefan Posch
- (Poland) Krystian Bielik
- (Poland) Dawid Kownacki
- (Poland) Sebastian Szymański
