= 2019 UEFA European Under-21 Championship qualification Group 9 =

Football tournament qualification stage

Group 9 of the 2019 UEFA European Under-21 Championship qualifying competition consisted of six teams: France, Slovenia, Montenegro, Bulgaria, Kazakhstan, and Luxembourg. The composition of the nine groups in the qualifying group stage was decided by the draw held on 26 January 2017, with the teams seeded according to their coefficient ranking.

The group was played in home-and-away round-robin format between 28 March 2017 and 16 October 2018. The group winners qualified directly for the final tournament, while the runners-up advanced to the play-offs if they were one of the four best runners-up among all nine groups (not counting results against the sixth-placed team).

== Standings ==
Pos	Team	Pld	W	D	L	GF	GA	GD	Pts	Qualification	France	Slovenia	Montenegro	Kazakhstan	Bulgaria	Luxembourg
1	France	10	9	1	0	24	6	+18	28	Final tournament	—	1–1	2–1	4–1	3–0	2–0
2	Slovenia	10	4	4	2	14	12	+2	16		1–3	—	2–0	2–1	1–1	3–1
3	Montenegro	10	3	2	5	15	15	0	11		0–2	1–3	—	5–1	0–0	3–0
4	Kazakhstan	10	2	4	4	13	18	−5	10 (Note: Head-to-head results: Bulgaria 2–2 Kazakhstan, Kazakhstan 1–1 Bulgaria (Kazakhstan won on away goals).)		0–3	0–0	1–1	—	1–1	3–0
5	Bulgaria	10	2	4	4	10	11	−1	10		0–1	3–0	3–1	2–2	—	0–1
6	Luxembourg	10	2	1	7	7	21	−14	7		2–3	1–1	1–3	0–3 (Note: The Luxembourg v Kazakhstan originally ended with a 1–2 win for Kazakhstan, but was later awarded as a 0–3 win for Kazakhstan, after UEFA concluded that Luxembourg had played an ineligible player.)	1–0	—

Source: UEFA
Rules for classification: Qualification tiebreakers

== Matches ==
Times are CET/CEST, (Note: CEST (UTC+2) for dates between 26 March and 28 October 2017 and between 25 March and 27 October 2018, and CET (UTC+1) for all other dates.) as listed by UEFA (local times, if different, are in parentheses).

28 March 2017
17:00

Luxembourg	0–3 Awarded (Note: The Luxembourg v Kazakhstan originally ended with a 1–2 win for Kazakhstan, but was later awarded as a 0–3 win for Kazakhstan, after UEFA concluded that Luxembourg had played an ineligible player.)	Kazakhstan
E. Muratovic 6' (pen.)	Report	Sokolenko 35'; Najaryan 60'

Stade Municipal de la Ville de Differdange, Differdange
Attendance: 620
Referee: Ferenc Karakó (Hungary)

1 September 2017
15:00 (18:00 AQTT)

Kazakhstan	1–1	Montenegro
Fedin 90+4' (pen.)	Report	Kukuličić 61'

Central Stadium, Aktobe
Attendance: 7,250
Referee: Alexandros Aretopoulos (Greece)
1 September 2017
16:30

Slovenia	3–1	Luxembourg
Ožbolt 51', 90+1' (pen.); Mlakar 59'	Report	Pinto 41'

Ajdovščina Stadium, Ajdovščina
Attendance: 300
Referee: Dejan Jakimovski (Macedonia)

5 September 2017
18:00 (19:00 EEST)

Bulgaria	0–1	Luxembourg
	Report	Tinelli 90'

Trace Arena, Stara Zagora
Attendance: 461
Referee: Bojan Nikolić (Serbia)
5 September 2017
18:30

France	4–1	Kazakhstan
Terrier 71', 83', 87'; Bamba 74'	Report	Zhalmukan 54'

MMArena, Le Mans
Attendance: 4,257
Referee: Donald Robertson (Scotland)

5 October 2017
18:30

Luxembourg	1–1	Slovenia
Tinelli 87'	Report	Žužek 41'

Stade Jos Haupert, Niederkorn
Attendance: 575
Referee: Ian McNabb (Northern Ireland)
5 October 2017
19:00

France	2–1	Montenegro
Terrier 66'; Mousset 75'	Report	Skenderović 45+1'

Stade de l'Aube, Troyes
Attendance: 4,615
Referee: Erez Papir (Israel)
6 October 2017
17:30 (18:30 EEST)

Bulgaria	2–2	Kazakhstan
Despodov 9'; Yordanov 51'	Report	Zhalmukan 20'; Omirtayev 86'

Trace Arena, Stara Zagora
Attendance: 510
Referee: Mykola Balakin (Ukraine)

9 October 2017
17:30

Montenegro	1–3	Slovenia
Lončar 43'	Report	Kramarič 9'; Pišek 71' (pen.); Vrbanec 78'

Podgorica City Stadium, Podgorica
Attendance: 600
Referee: Erik Lambrechts (Belgium)
9 October 2017
21:00

Luxembourg	2–3	France
E. Muratovic 9', 27' (pen.)	Report	Terrier 48', 87'; Mousset 75'

Stade Émile Mayrisch, Esch-sur-Alzette
Attendance: 836
Referee: Dimitrios Massias (Cyprus)
10 October 2017
15:00 (19:00 ALMT)

Kazakhstan	1–1	Bulgaria
Zainutdinov 76'	Report	Kerchev 89'

Astana Arena, Astana
Attendance: 1,420
Referee: Tomasz Musiał (Poland)

9 November 2017
19:00

France	3–0	Bulgaria
Terrier 58'; Ntcham 81'; Mousset 90'	Report

MMArena, Le Mans
Attendance: 4,794
Referee: Thorvaldur Árnason (Iceland)
9 November 2017
19:00

Slovenia	2–0	Montenegro
Mlakar 61'; Vrbanec 79'	Report

Nova Gorica Sports Park, Nova Gorica
Attendance: 550
Referee: Barbeno Luca (San Marino)

13 November 2017
18:45

Slovenia	1–3	France
Tučić 21'	Report	Dembélé 34' (pen.), 41', 45+1'

Domžale Sports Park, Domžale
Attendance: 400
Referee: Marco Guida (Italy)
14 November 2017
17:30 (18:30 EET)

Bulgaria	3–1	Montenegro
Despodov 47'; Kraev 58'; Milev 66'	Report	Krsotvić 53'

Beroe Stadium, Stara Zagora
Attendance: 370
Referee: Aleksandrs Golubevs (Latvia)

23 March 2018
14:00 (19:00 ALMT)

Kazakhstan	0–3	France
	Report	Dembélé 52'; Augustin 56'; Bamba 59'

Astana Arena, Astana
Attendance: 7,500
Referee: Keith Kennedy (Northern Ireland)
23 March 2018
18:30

Luxembourg	1–3	Montenegro
B. Muratovic 70'	Report	Janketić 49'; Skenderović 71'; Stijepović 90+4'

Stade Municipal de la Ville de Differdange, Differdange
Attendance: 812
Referee: Mykola Balakin (Ukraine)

27 March 2018
15:00 (19:00 ALMT)

Kazakhstan	3–0	Luxembourg
Vorogovskiy 10', 13'; Fedin 73' (pen.)	Report

Astana Arena, Astana
Attendance: 4,500
Referee: Denis Scherbakov (Belarus)
27 March 2018
17:30 (18:30 EEST)

Bulgaria	3–0	Slovenia
Vutov 20'; Despodov 42', 83'	Report

Trace Arena, Stara Zagora
Attendance: 400
Referee: Stavros Mantalos (Greece)
27 March 2018
21:05

Montenegro	0–2	France
	Report	Amian 60'; Augustin 87' (pen.)

Gradski stadion, Nikšić
Attendance: 1,000
Referee: Halil Umut Meler (Turkey)

7 September 2018
15:00 (19:00 ALMT)

Kazakhstan	0–0	Slovenia
	Report

Astana Arena, Astana
Attendance: 600
Referee: Kai Erik Steen (Norway)
7 September 2018
18:00 (19:00 EEST)

Bulgaria	0–1	France
	Report	Dembélé 57'

Trace Arena, Stara Zagora
Attendance: 820
Referee: Irfan Peljto (Bosnia and Herzegovina)

11 September 2018
16:30

Slovenia	2–1	Kazakhstan
Lipušček 11'; Gliha 89'	Report	Fedin 79'

Ptuj City Stadium, Ptuj
Attendance: 470
Referee: Donatas Rumšas (Lithuania)
11 September 2018
20:30

Montenegro	0–0	Bulgaria
	Report

Gradski stadion, Nikšić
Attendance: 295
Referee: Pavel Orel (Czech Republic)
11 September 2018
20:45

France	2–0	Luxembourg
Aouar 60'; Bamba 88'	Report

Stade de la Meinau, Strasbourg
Attendance: 7,367
Referee: Genc Nuza (Kosovo)

12 October 2018
16:00

Montenegro	3–0	Luxembourg
Osmajić 26'; Vukotić 29'; Vukčević 72' (pen.)	Report

Gradski stadion, Nikšić
Attendance: 258
Referee: Lionel Tschudi (Switzerland)
12 October 2018
18:00

Slovenia	1–1	Bulgaria
Šušnjara 63'	Report	Yordanov 86'

Stadion Z'dežele, Celje
Attendance: 500
Referee: Ádám Farkas (Hungary)

16 October 2018
16:00

Montenegro	5–1	Kazakhstan
Uskoković 20'; Milošević 53'; Vukotić 73'; Drinčić 82'; Miličković 87'	Report	Soltanov 26'

Gradski stadion, Nikšić
Attendance: 250
Referee: Petri Viljanen (Finland)
16 October 2018
18:45

France	1–1	Slovenia
Aouar 54'	Report	Ožbolt 70'

Stade Gaston Gérard, Dijon
Attendance: 7,046
Referee: Kristoffer Karlsson (Sweden)
16 October 2018
19:00

Luxembourg	1–0	Bulgaria
Hall 25'	Report

Stade Jos Haupert, Niederkorn
Attendance: 385
Referee: Nicholas Walsh (Scotland)

== Goalscorers ==
There were 83 goals scored in 30 matches, for an average of 2.77 goals per match.

7 goals

- (France) Martin Terrier

5 goals

- (France) Moussa Dembélé

4 goals

- (Bulgaria) Kiril Despodov

3 goals

- (France) Jonathan Bamba
- (France) Lys Mousset
- (Kazakhstan) Maxim Fedin
- (Luxembourg) Edvin Muratovic
- (Slovenia) Alen Ožbolt

2 goals

- (Bulgaria) Tonislav Yordanov
- (France) Houssem Aouar
- (France) Jean-Kévin Augustin
- (Kazakhstan) Yan Vorogovskiy
- (Kazakhstan) Didar Zhalmukan
- (Luxembourg) Loris Tinelli
- (Montenegro) Meris Skenderović
- (Montenegro) Ilija Vukotić
- (Slovenia) Jan Mlakar
- (Slovenia) Matic Vrbanec

1 goal

- (Bulgaria) Ventsislav Kerchev
- (Bulgaria) Bozhidar Kraev
- (Bulgaria) Nasko Milev
- (Bulgaria) Antonio Vutov
- (France) Kelvin Amian
- (France) Olivier Ntcham
- (Kazakhstan) Gevorg Najaryan
- (Kazakhstan) Oralkhan Omirtayev
- (Kazakhstan) Aleksandr Sokolenko
- (Kazakhstan) Zhandos Soltanov
- (Kazakhstan) Baktiyor Zainutdinov
- (Luxembourg) Tim Hall
- (Luxembourg) Belmin Muratovic
- (Luxembourg) Ricardo Couto Pinto
- (Montenegro) Miloš Drinčić
- (Montenegro) Velizar Janketić
- (Montenegro) Nikola Krsotvić
- (Montenegro) Filip Kukuličić
- (Montenegro) Stefan Lončar
- (Montenegro) Marko Miličković
- (Montenegro) Stefan Milošević
- (Montenegro) Milutin Osmajić
- (Montenegro) Ognjen Stijepović
- (Montenegro) Luka Uskoković
- (Montenegro) Andrija Vukčević
- (Slovenia) Erik Gliha
- (Slovenia) Martin Kramarič
- (Slovenia) Žiga Lipušček
- (Slovenia) Janez Pišek
- (Slovenia) Luka Šušnjara
- (Slovenia) Milan Tučić
- (Slovenia) Žan Žužek
