= Ridvan Kardesoglu =

Liechtenstein footballer

Personal information
- Full name: Ridvan Kardesoglu
- Date of birth: 12 October 1996 (age 30)
- Place of birth: Vaduz, Liechtenstein
- Position: Forward

Team information
- Current team: FC Schaan
- Number: 23

Youth career
- –2015: USV Eschen/Mauren

Senior career*
Years	Team	Apps	(Gls)
2015–2019	USV Eschen/Mauren	25	(1)
2019–2021	FC Chur 97	21	(7)
2020–2021	→ FC Balzers (loan)	3	(0)
2021–2022	FC Ruggell	0	(0)
2022–2023	FC Nenzing	14	(1)
2023	FC Höchst 1921	7	(1)
2023–2024	FC Montlingen		
2024–	FC Schaan		

International career^{‡}
2017–2018	Liechtenstein U21	8	(1)
2019–	Liechtenstein	10	(0)
- * Club domestic league appearances and goals as of 17:34, 1 June 2024 (UTC) ‡ National team caps and goals as of 23 September 2022

Ridvan Kardesoglu (born 12 October 1996) is a Liechtensteiner footballer who plays as a forward for FC Schaan and the Liechtenstein national team.

== Career ==
Kardesoglu made his international debut for Liechtenstein on 15 November 2019 in a UEFA Euro 2020 qualifying match against Finland, which finished as a 0–3 away loss.

== Personal life ==
Kardesoglu is of Turkish descent.

== Career statistics ==
=== International ===
As of 23 September 2022

Liechtenstein
Year	Apps	Goals
2019	1	0
2020	2	0
2021	5	0
2022	2	0
Total	10	0
