= Roman Chanturia =

Georgian football player

Personal information
- Date of birth: 9 February 1996 (age 30)
- Place of birth: Tbilisi, Georgia
- Height: 1.83 m (6 ft 0 in)
- Position: Forward

Youth career
- 2004–2006: Olimpiki Tbilisi
- 2006–2013: Locomotive Tbilisi
- 2013–2016: Empoli

Senior career*
Years	Team	Apps	(Gls)
2016–2019	Empoli	0	(0)
2017	→ Olhanense (loan)	5	(1)
2017	→ Prato (loan)	12	(1)
2018	→ Locomotive Tbilisi (loan)	7	(1)
2018	→ Senglea Athletic (loan)	8	(1)
2019	→ Dinamo Batumi (loan)	10	(2)
2020–	Dila Gori	0	(0)

International career
2012–2013	Georgia U-17	5	(0)
2014–2015	Georgia U-19	5	(0)
2014–2017	Georgia U-21	8	(4)
- * Club domestic league appearances and goals as of 22 June 2019

Roman Chanturia (Georgian: რომან ჭანტურია; born 9 February 1996) is a Georgian football player.

== Club career ==
He made his professional debut in the Segunda Liga for Olhanense on 15 February 2017 in a game against União da Madeira.

On 17 August 2018, he joined Maltese club Senglea Athletic on loan.
