= 2019 UEFA European Under-21 Championship qualification Group 4 =

Group 4 of the 2019 UEFA European Under-21 Championship qualifying competition consisted of six teams: England, Netherlands, Ukraine, Scotland, Latvia, and Andorra. The composition of the nine groups in the qualifying group stage was decided by the draw held on 26 January 2017, with the teams seeded according to their coefficient ranking.

The group was played in home-and-away round-robin format between 10 June 2017 and 16 October 2018. The group winners qualified directly for the final tournament, while the runners-up advanced to the play-offs if they were one of the four best runners-up among all nine groups (not counting results against the sixth-placed team).

== Standings ==
Pos	Team	Pld	W	D	L	GF	GA	GD	Pts	Qualification	England	Netherlands	Ukraine	Scotland	Latvia	Andorra
1	England	10	8	2	0	23	4	+19	26	Final tournament	—	0–0	2–1	3–1	3–0	7–0
2	Netherlands	10	5	3	2	21	6	+15	18		1–1	—	3–0	1–2	3–0	8–0
3	Ukraine	10	5	2	3	18	12	+6	17		0–2	1–1	—	3–1	3–2	1–0
4	Scotland	10	4	2	4	13	13	0	14		0–2	2–0	0–2	—	1–1	3–0
5	Latvia	10	0	4	6	5	18	−13	4		1–2	0–3	1–1	0–2	—	0–0
6	Andorra	10	0	3	7	1	28	−27	3		0–1	0–1	0–6	1–1	0–0	—

Source: UEFA
Rules for classification: Qualification tiebreakers

== Matches ==
Times are CET/CEST, (Note: CEST (UTC+2) for dates between 26 March and 28 October 2017 and between 25 March and 27 October 2018, and CET (UTC+1) for all other dates.) as listed by UEFA (local times, if different, are in parentheses).

10 June 2017
17:00 (18:00 EEST)

Latvia	0–0	Andorra
	Report

Zemgale Olympic Center, Jelgava
Attendance: 459
Referee: Luca Barbeno (San Marino)

1 September 2017
16:30 (17:30 EEST)

Latvia	1–1	Ukraine
Uldriķis 9'	Report	Lyednyev 22'

Zemgale Olympic Center, Jelgava
Attendance: 648
Referee: Tim Marshall (Northern Ireland)
1 September 2017
18:00

Netherlands	1–1	England
Ramselaar 32'	Report	Calvert-Lewin 20'

De Vijverberg, Doetinchem
Attendance: 5,211
Referee: Ola Hobber Nilsen (Norway)

5 September 2017
18:00

Andorra	0–6	Ukraine
	Report	Bilenkyi 29'; Zotko 37' (pen.), 88'; Mysyk 43' (pen.); Pikhalyonok 58'; Boryachuk 86'

Estadi Comunal, Andorra la Vella
Referee: Nicolas Laforge (Belgium)
5 September 2017
20:30 (19:30 BST)

Scotland	2–0	Netherlands
Burke 62'; Mallan 79'	Report

St Mirren Park, Paisley
Referee: Rade Obrenovic (Slovenia)
5 September 2017
20:45 (19:45 BST)

England	3–0	Latvia
Gray 13'; Abraham 35'; Palmer 70'	Report

Vitality Stadium, Bournemouth
Attendance: 8,514
Referee: Vasilis Dimitriou (Cyprus)

6 October 2017
18:00

Netherlands	3–0	Latvia
Idrissi 17'; Bergwijn 35'; Ramselaar 45' (pen.)	Report

De Vijverberg, Doetinchem
Attendance: 7785
Referee: Dennis Antamo (Finland)
6 October 2017
20:45 (19:45 BST)

England	3–1	Scotland
Onomah 14'; Abraham 49' (pen.); Solanke 79'	Report	Cadden 78'

Riverside Stadium, Middlesbrough
Attendance: 20,126
Referee: Juan Martínez Munuera (Spain)

10 October 2017
17:00 (18:00 EEST)

Ukraine	1–1	Netherlands
Kovalenko 29' (pen.)	Report	Kluivert 63'

Obolon Arena, Kyiv
Referee: Kristo Tohver (Estonia)
10 October 2017
17:00 (18:00 EEST)

Latvia	0–2	Scotland
	Report	Burke 16'; McBurnie 19'

Daugava Stadium, Liepāja
Attendance: 826
Referee: Mario Zebec (Croatia)
10 October 2017
18:00

Andorra	0–1	England
	Report	Davies 52'

Estadi Comunal, Andorra la Vella
Attendance: 457
Referee: Anastasios Papapetrou (Greece)

10 November 2017
17:00 (18:00 EET)

Ukraine	0–2	England
	Report	Solanke 16'; Lukyanchuk 62' (o.g.)

Obolon Arena, Kyiv
Attendance: 2,520
Referee: Frank Schneider (France)
10 November 2017
18:30

Netherlands	8–0	Andorra
Til 20'; Lammers 28'; Idrissi 30', 58'; Zivkovic 64'; Ramselaar 68' (pen.); De Jong 73' (pen.); Kluivert 78'	Report

De Vijverberg, Doetinchem
Referee: Ian McNabb (Northern Ireland)
10 November 2017
20:30 (19:30 GMT)

Scotland	1–1	Latvia
Hardie 90+3' (pen.)	Report	Uldriķis 45+6'

McDiarmid Park, Perth
Attendance: 1449
Referee: Jørgen Burchardt (Denmark)

14 November 2017
20:30 (19:30 GMT)

Scotland	0–2	Ukraine
	Report	Boryachuk 45+1'; Kovalenko 90+4'

McDiarmid Park, Perth
Referee: Donatas Rumšas (Lithuania)

23 March 2018
18:00

Andorra	1–1	Scotland
Fernández 77' (pen.)	Report	Morgan 90+1'

Estadi Comunal, Andorra la Vella
Referee: Alain Durieux (Luxembourg)

27 March 2018
18:00

Andorra	0–1	Netherlands
	Report	Danjuma 41'

Estadi Comunal, Andorra la Vella
Referee: Alex Troleis (Faroe Islands)
27 March 2018
19:00 (18:00 BST)

England	2–1	Ukraine
Calvert-Lewin 41'; Solanke 88'	Report	Shaparenko 83'

Bramall Lane, Sheffield
Attendance: 22,601
Referee: Mads-Kristoffer Kristoffersen (Denmark)

6 September 2018
20:30 (19:30 BST)

Scotland	3–0	Andorra
Hornby 45' (pen.), 69', 83'	Report

Tynecastle Park, Edinburgh
Referee: Dejan Jakimovski (Macedonia)
6 September 2018
20:45 (19:45 BST)

England	0–0	Netherlands
	Report

Carrow Road, Norwich
Attendance: 16,369
Referee: Roi Reinshreiber (Israel)
7 September 2018
18:00 (19:00 EEST)

Ukraine	3–2	Latvia
Popov 21'; Shved 28'; Kovalenko 65'	Report	Fjodorovs 60'; Ķigurs 63'

Slavutych-Arena, Zaporizhia
Attendance: 4252
Referee: Ivaylo Stoyanov (Bulgaria)

11 September 2018
16:00 (17:00 EEST)

Latvia	1–2	England
Jurkovskis 28'	Report	Abraham 40'; Mount 73'

Zemgale Olympic Center, Jelgava
Attendance: 1,037
Referee: Peter Kralović (Slovakia)
11 September 2018
18:00 (19:00 EEST)

Ukraine	1–0	Andorra
Shved 87'	Report

Slavutych-Arena, Zaporizhia
Referee: Suren Baliyan (Armenia)
11 September 2018
18:30

Netherlands	1–2	Scotland
Koopmeiners 70'	Report	Hornby 54', 89' (pen.)

De Vijverberg, Doetinchem
Referee: Antti Munukka (Finland)

11 October 2018
20:45 (19:45 BST)

England	7–0	Andorra
Lookman 9'; Konsa 28'; Calvert-Lewin 45+1', 48' (pen.); Solanke 82'; Nelson 90+2'; García 90+4' (o.g.)	Report

Proact Stadium, Chesterfield
Attendance: 7,147
Referee: Urs Schnyder (Switzerland)
12 October 2018
18:00 (19:00 EEST)

Ukraine	3–1	Scotland
Zubkov 32', 56'; Kovalenko 90+4'	Report	Morgan 1'

Obolon Arena, Kyiv
Referee: Bojan Pandžić (Sweden)
12 October 2018
18:30 (19:30 EEST)

Latvia	0–3	Netherlands
	Report	Kluivert 50'; Zommers 89' (o.g.); Dilrosun 90+4'

Skonto Stadium, Riga
Attendance: 738
Referee: Nicolas Laforge (Belgium)

16 October 2018
18:30

Netherlands	3–0	Ukraine
Kluivert 21'; Zivkovic 24', 78'	Report

De Vijverberg, Doetinchem
Referee: Marius Avram (Romania)
16 October 2018
18:30 (17:30 BST)

Scotland	0–2	England
	Report	Nelson 60'; Dowell 90+2'

Tynecastle Park, Edinburgh
Attendance: 4,122
Referee: Marco Di Bello (Italy)
16 October 2018
18:30

Andorra	0–0	Latvia
	Report

Estadi Comunal, Andorra la Vella
Attendance: 152
Referee: Vitaliy Romanov (Ukraine)

== Goalscorers ==
There were 81 goals scored in 30 matches, for an average of 2.7 goals per match.

5 goals

- (Scotland) Fraser Hornby

4 goals

- (England) Dominic Calvert-Lewin
- (England) Dominic Solanke
- (Netherlands) Justin Kluivert
- (Ukraine) Viktor Kovalenko

3 goals

- (England) Tammy Abraham
- (Netherlands) Oussama Idrissi
- (Netherlands) Bart Ramselaar
- (Netherlands) Richairo Zivkovic

2 goals

- (England) Reiss Nelson
- (Latvia) Roberts Uldriķis
- (Scotland) Oliver Burke
- (Scotland) Lewis Morgan
- (Ukraine) Andriy Boryachuk
- (Ukraine) Maryan Shved
- (Ukraine) Ivan Zotko
- (Ukraine) Oleksandr Zubkov

1 goal

- (Andorra) Ricard Fernández
- (England) Tom Davies
- (England) Kieran Dowell
- (England) Demarai Gray
- (England) Ezri Konsa
- (England) Ademola Lookman
- (England) Mason Mount
- (England) Josh Onomah
- (England) Kasey Palmer
- (Latvia) Vladislavs Fjodorovs
- (Latvia) Raivis Jurkovskis
- (Latvia) Mārtiņš Ķigurs
- (Netherlands) Steven Bergwijn
- (Netherlands) Arnaut Danjuma
- (Netherlands) Javairô Dilrosun
- (Netherlands) Frenkie de Jong
- (Netherlands) Teun Koopmeiners
- (Netherlands) Sam Lammers
- (Netherlands) Guus Til
- (Scotland) Chris Cadden
- (Scotland) Ryan Hardie
- (Scotland) Stevie Mallan
- (Scotland) Oli McBurnie
- (Ukraine) Stanislav Bilenkyi
- (Ukraine) Bohdan Lyednyev
- (Ukraine) Maryan Mysyk
- (Ukraine) Oleksandr Pikhalyonok
- (Ukraine) Denys Popov
- (Ukraine) Mykola Shaparenko

1 own goal

- (Andorra) Christian García (against England)
- (Latvia) Kristaps Zommers (against Netherlands)
- (Ukraine) Pavlo Lukyanchuk (against England)
