= 2019 UEFA European Under-21 Championship qualification Group 2 =

Football tournament qualification stage

Group 2 of the 2019 UEFA European Under-21 Championship qualifying competition consisted of six teams: Spain, Slovakia, Iceland, Albania, Estonia, and Northern Ireland. The composition of the nine groups in the qualifying group stage was decided by the draw held on 26 January 2017, with the teams seeded according to their coefficient ranking.

The group was played in home-and-away round-robin format between 8 June 2017 and 16 October 2018. The group winners qualified directly for the final tournament, while the runners-up advanced to the play-offs if they were one of the four best runners-up among all nine groups (not counting results against the sixth-placed team).

== Standings ==
Pos	Team	Pld	W	D	L	GF	GA	GD	Pts	Qualification	Spain		Slovakia	Iceland	Albania	Estonia
1	Spain	10	9	0	1	31	10	+21	27	Final tournament	—	1–2	5–1	1–0	3–0	3–1
2	Northern Ireland	10	6	2	2	15	11	+4	20		3–5	—	1–0	0–0	1–0	4–2
3	Slovakia	10	6	0	4	17	18	−1	18		1–4	1–0	—	0–2	4–1	2–0
4	Iceland	10	3	2	5	16	19	−3	11		2–7	0–1	2–3	—	2–3	5–2
5	Albania	10	1	4	5	9	17	−8	7		0–1	1–1	2–3	0–0	—	0–0
6	Estonia	10	0	2	8	11	24	−13	2		0–1	1–2	1–2	2–3	2–2	—

Source: UEFA
Rules for classification: Qualification tiebreakers

== Matches ==
Times are CET/CEST, (Note: CEST (UTC+2) for dates between 26 March and 28 October 2017 and between 25 March and 27 October 2018, and CET (UTC+1) for all other dates.) as listed by UEFA (local times, if different, are in parentheses).

8 June 2017
17:00 (18:00 EEST)

Estonia	1–2	Northern Ireland
Sappinen 50'	Report	Parkhouse 74'; Donnelly 90+4' (pen.)

Kadriorg Stadium, Tallinn
Attendance: 312
Referee: Irfan Peljto (Bosnia and Herzegovina)

12 June 2017
20:00

Albania	0–0	Estonia
	Report

Elbasan Arena, Elbasan
Attendance: 3,000
Referee: Espen Eskås (Norway)

31 August 2017
20:30 (19:30 BST)

Northern Ireland	1–0	Albania
Donnelly 90+5' (pen.)	Report

Mourneview Park, Lurgan
Attendance: 234
Referee: Donatas Rumšas (Lithuania)
1 September 2017
16:45 (17:45 EEST)

Estonia	1–2	Slovakia
Poom 83'	Report	Sipľak 14'; Mutso 89' (o.g.)

Kadriorg Stadium, Tallinn
Attendance: 243
Referee: Jari Järvinen (Finland)

4 September 2017
19:00 (17:00 WET)

Iceland	2–3	Albania
Andrésson 45'; Einarsson 71'	Report	Abazaj 45+1', 65'; Durmishaj 75'

Víkingsvöllur, Reykjavík
Attendance: 584
Referee: Paul Mclaughlin (Republic of Ireland)
5 September 2017
19:15 (20:15 EEST)

Estonia	0–1	Spain
	Report	Soler 65'

A. Le Coq Arena, Tallinn
Attendance: 964
Referee: Glenn Nyberg (Sweden)
5 September 2017
20:30

Slovakia	1–0	Northern Ireland
Bénes 61'	Report

Štadión FK Senica, Senica
Attendance: 2,339
Referee: Halil Umut Meler (Turkey)

5 October 2017
17:20

Slovakia	0–2	Iceland
	Report	A. Guðmundsson 8', 90+5'

NTC Poprad, Poprad
Attendance: 3,076
Referee: Georgios Kominis (Greece)

10 October 2017
19:00

Albania	0–0	Iceland
	Report

Elbasan Arena, Elbasan
Attendance: 2,150
Referee: Pavel Orel (Czech Republic)
10 October 2017
20:30

Slovakia	1–4	Spain
Vavro 59'	Report	Merino 26'; Oyarzabal 49'; Rodri 56'; Ceballos 69'

NTC Poprad, Poprad
Attendance: 5,574
Referee: Massimiliano Irrati (Italy)
10 October 2017
20:30 (19:30 BST)

Northern Ireland	4–2	Estonia
Johnson 2'; Gorman 43'; Sykes 61'; Igonen 75' (o.g.)	Report	Liivak 11'; Sappinen 20'

Mourneview Park, Lurgan
Attendance: 463
Referee: Petur Reinert (Faroe Islands)

9 November 2017
19:30

Spain	1–0	Iceland
Fabián 36'	Report

La Condomina, Murcia
Attendance: 15,168
Referee: Eitan Shmuelevitz (Israel)
10 November 2017
18:00

Albania	1–1	Northern Ireland
Ramadani 83'	Report	Lavery 89'

Selman Stërmasi Stadium, Tirana
Attendance: 1,250
Referee: Fran Jović (Croatia)

14 November 2017
17:00 (18:00 EET)

Estonia	2–3	Iceland
Sinyavskiy 45'; Lilander 51'	Report	A. Guðmundsson 56'; H. Guðmundsson 74'; Karlsson 80'

A. Le Coq Arena, Tallinn
Attendance: 369
Referee: Alper Ulusoy (Turkey)
14 November 2017
21:50

Spain	5–1	Slovakia
Ceballos 38', 55', 61'; Córdoba 53'; Mayoral 86'	Report	Fabián 23' (o.g.)

Cartagonova, Cartagena
Attendance: 12,912
Referee: Bojan Pandžić (Sweden)

22 March 2018
20:45 (19:45 GMT)

Northern Ireland	3–5	Spain
Donnelly 30' (pen.), 45+2'; Lavery 68'	Report	Oyarzabal 15', 44'; Mayoral 47', 75', 84'

Shamrock Park, Portadown
Attendance: 2,309
Referee: Bartosz Frankowski (Poland)
23 March 2018
17:20

Albania	2–3	Slovakia
Manaj 44', 52'	Report	Špalek 48'; Dimun 80'; Mráz 87'

Selman Stërmasi Stadium, Tirana
Attendance: 985
Referee: Stefan Apostolov (Bulgaria)

26 March 2018
20:30 (19:30 BST)

Northern Ireland	0–0	Iceland
	Report

The Showgrounds, Coleraine
Attendance: 1,088
Referee: Fedayi San (Switzerland)
27 March 2018
17:20

Slovakia	4–1	Albania
Haraslín 19'; Mráz 45+2', 74'; Sipľak 70'	Report	Manaj 63'

Štadión pod Dubňom, Žilina
Attendance: 2,177
Referee: Iwan Arwel Griffith (Wales)
27 March 2018
19:30

Spain	3–1	Estonia
Fabián 8'; Mayoral 37', 51'	Report	Sinyavskiy 59'

El Toralín, Ponferrada
Attendance: 7,000
Referee: Dumitri Muntean (Moldova)

6 September 2018
18:45 (16:45 WET)

Iceland	5–2	Estonia
Karlsson 19', 22'; Friðjónsson 45+3'; Sigurðsson 53'; A. Guðmundsson 64'	Report	Liivak 61' (pen.); Kaldma 68'

Kópavogsvöllur, Kópavogur
Attendance: 332
Referee: Rahim Hasanov (Azerbaijan)
6 September 2018
20:00

Spain	3–0	Albania
Oyarzabal 5'; Mayoral 56'; Mir 90+2'	Report

Nuevo Arcángel, Córdoba
Attendance: 8,025
Referee: Krzysztof Jakubik (Poland)

11 September 2018
17:30 (15:30 WET)

Iceland	2–3	Slovakia
Guðmundsson 33', 90+3' (pen.)	Report	Bénes 58'; Vestenický 90'; Rodák 90+4'

KR-völlur, Reykjavík
Attendance: 337
Referee: Alexander Harkam (Austria)
11 September 2018
18:45

Spain	1–2	Northern Ireland
Mir 90+2'	Report	Lavery 4'; Donnelly 8' (pen.)

Carlos Belmonte, Albacete
Attendance: 3,400
Referee: Jonathan Lardot (Belgium)

11 October 2018
18:45 (16:45 WET)

Iceland	0–1	Northern Ireland
	Report	Ballard 90'

Fylkisvöllur, Reykjavík
Attendance: 337
Referee: Jens Maae (Denmark)
11 October 2018
19:00

Albania	0–1	Spain
	Report	Mir 84'

Selman Stërmasi Stadium, Tirana
Attendance: 1,150
Referee: João Pinheiro (Portugal)
12 October 2018
20:30

Slovakia	2–0	Estonia
Jirka 1'; Vestenický 58'	Report

MOL Aréna, Dunajská Streda
Attendance: 3,373
Referee: Igor Pajac (Croatia)

16 October 2018
18:00 (19:00 EEST)

Estonia	2–2	Albania
Liivak 32'; Kuusk 87'	Report	Seferi 12', 69'

Pärnu Rannastaadion, Pärnu
Attendance: 237
Referee: Yigal Frid (Israel)
16 October 2018
18:45 (16:45 WET)

Iceland	2–7	Spain
Þorsteinsson 41'; Karlsson 58'	Report	Oyarzabal 24' (pen.); Mir 25', 40'; Gunnarsson 45+2' (o.g.); Soler 54'; Mayoral 87'; Fabián 90'

Fylkisvöllur, Reykjavík
Attendance: 368
Referee: Cătălin Gaman (Romania)
16 October 2018
20:30 (19:30 BST)

Northern Ireland	1–0	Slovakia
Sykes 62'	Report

Windsor Park, Belfast
Attendance: 5,462
Referee: Eitan Shmuelevitz (Israel)

== Goalscorers ==
There were 99 goals scored in 30 matches, for an average of 3.3 goals per match.

8 goals

- (Spain) Borja Mayoral

6 goals

- (Iceland) Albert Guðmundsson

5 goals

- (Northern Ireland) Liam Donnelly
- (Spain) Rafa Mir
- (Spain) Mikel Oyarzabal

4 goals

- (Iceland) Óttar Magnús Karlsson
- (Spain) Dani Ceballos

3 goals

- (Estonia) Frank Liivak
- (Albania) Rey Manaj
- (Northern Ireland) Shayne Lavery
- (Slovakia) Samuel Mráz
- (Spain) Fabián

2 goals

- (Albania) Kristal Abazaj
- (Albania) Taulant Seferi
- (Northern Ireland) Mark Sykes
- (Estonia) Rauno Sappinen
- (Estonia) Vlasiy Sinyavskiy
- (Slovakia) László Bénes
- (Slovakia) Michal Sipľak
- (Slovakia) Tomáš Vestenický
- (Spain) Carlos Soler

1 goal

- (Albania) Fiorin Durmishaj
- (Albania) Ylber Ramadani
- (Estonia) Sören Kaldma
- (Estonia) Märten Kuusk
- (Estonia) Michael Lilander
- (Estonia) Markus Poom
- (Iceland) Axel Óskar Andrésson
- (Iceland) Viktor Karl Einarsson
- (Iceland) Samúel Friðjónsson
- (Iceland) Hans Viktor Guðmundsson
- (Iceland) Arnór Sigurðsson
- (Iceland) Jón Dagur Þorsteinsson
- (Northern Ireland) Daniel Ballard
- (Northern Ireland) Dale Gorman
- (Northern Ireland) Ryan Johnson
- (Northern Ireland) David Parkhouse
- (Slovakia) Milan Dimun
- (Slovakia) Lukáš Haraslín
- (Slovakia) Erik Jirka
- (Slovakia) Marek Rodák
- (Slovakia) Nikolas Špalek
- (Slovakia) Denis Vavro
- (Spain) Iñigo Córdoba
- (Spain) Mikel Merino
- (Spain) Rodri

1 own goal

- (Estonia) Matvei Igonen (against Northern Ireland)
- (Estonia) Kaspar Mutso (against Slovakia)
- (Iceland) Hörður Ingi Gunnarsson (against Spain)
- (Spain) Fabián (against Slovakia)
