= 2019 UEFA European Under-21 Championship squads =

Football team member listings

The following is a list of squads for all twelve national teams that competed at the 2019 UEFA European Under-21 Championship. Each national team had to submit a final squad of 23 players, three of whom had to be goalkeepers.

Players in boldface have been capped at full international level either prior to the completion of the tournament or afterwards.

Age, caps, goals and club as of 16 June 2019.

== Group A ==
=== Italy ===
Head coach: Luigi Di Biagio

The 23-man squad was announced on 6 June 2019. Andrea Pinamonti had an injury and thus Federico Bonazzoli was called in his place.

No.	Pos.	Player	Date of birth (age)	Caps	Goals	Club
1	GK	**Emil Audero** (Note: Capped for Indonesia)	18 January 1997 (aged 22)	10	0	(Italian Football Federation) Sampdoria
16	GK	Lorenzo Montipò	20 February 1996 (aged 23)	2	0	(Italian Football Federation) Benevento (on loan from Novara)
22	GK	**Alex Meret**	22 March 1997 (aged 22)	2	0	(Italian Football Federation) Napoli
2	DF	Arturo Calabresi	17 March 1996 (aged 23)	7	0	(Italian Football Federation) Bologna
3	DF	Giuseppe Pezzella	29 November 1997 (aged 21)	13	0	(Italian Football Federation) Genoa (on loan from Udinese)
4	DF	Kevin Bonifazi	19 May 1996 (aged 23)	6	0	(Italian Football Federation) SPAL
6	DF	**Alessandro Bastoni**	13 April 1999 (aged 20)	5	1	(Italian Football Federation) Parma (on loan from Inter Milan)
12	DF	**Federico Dimarco**	10 November 1997 (aged 21)	8	1	(Italian Football Federation) Parma (on loan from Inter Milan)
13	DF	**Gianluca Mancini**	17 April 1996 (aged 23)	10	0	(Italian Football Federation) Atalanta
15	DF	Claud Adjapong	6 May 1998 (aged 21)	13	0	(Italian Football Federation) Sassuolo
19	DF	Filippo Romagna	26 May 1997 (aged 22)	16	0	(Italian Football Federation) Cagliari
5	MF	**Sandro Tonali**	8 May 2000 (aged 19)	2	0	(Italian Football Federation) Brescia
7	MF	**Lorenzo Pellegrini**	19 June 1996 (aged 22)	11	4	(Italian Football Federation) Roma
8	MF	**Nicolò Zaniolo**	2 July 1999 (aged 19)	4	0	(Italian Football Federation) Roma
10	MF	**Rolando Mandragora**	29 June 1997 (aged 21)	23	0	(Italian Football Federation) Udinese
18	MF	**Nicolò Barella**	7 February 1997 (aged 22)	6	0	(Italian Football Federation) Cagliari
21	MF	**Manuel Locatelli**	8 January 1998 (aged 21)	17	1	(Italian Football Federation) Sassuolo (on loan from AC Milan)
23	MF	Alessandro Murgia	9 August 1996 (aged 22)	14	1	(Italian Football Federation) SPAL (on loan from Lazio)
9	FW	**Patrick Cutrone**	3 January 1998 (aged 21)	12	4	(Italian Football Federation) AC Milan
11	FW	**Riccardo Orsolini**	24 January 1997 (aged 22)	13	3	(Italian Football Federation) Bologna
14	FW	**Federico Chiesa**	25 October 1997 (aged 21)	10	2	(Italian Football Federation) Fiorentina
17	FW	Federico Bonazzoli	21 May 1997 (aged 22)	8	2	(Italian Football Federation) Padova (on loan from Sampdoria)
20	FW	**Moise Kean**	28 February 2000 (aged 19)	3	2	(Italian Football Federation) Juventus

=== Spain ===
Head coach: Luis de la Fuente

The 25-man provisional squad was announced on 17 May 2019. Brahim Díaz had an injury and thus Marc Cucurella was called in his place. The final list was published on 5 June 2019. Pedro Porro had an injury and thus Pol Lirola was called in his place.

No.	Pos.	Player	Date of birth (age)	Caps	Goals	Club
1	GK	Antonio Sivera	11 August 1996 (aged 22)	5	0	(Royal Spanish Football Federation) Alavés
13	GK	**Unai Simón**	11 June 1997 (aged 22)	9	0	(Royal Spanish Football Federation) Athletic Bilbao
23	GK	Dani Martín	8 July 1998 (aged 20)	0	0	(Royal Spanish Football Federation) Sporting Gijón
2	DF	Jesús Vallejo	5 January 1997 (aged 22)	17	0	(Royal Spanish Football Federation) Real Madrid
3	DF	Aarón Martín	22 April 1997 (aged 22)	10	0	(German Football Association) Mainz 05
4	DF	Jorge Meré	17 April 1997 (aged 22)	28	3	(German Football Association) 1. FC Köln
5	DF	**Unai Núñez**	30 January 1997 (aged 22)	10	0	(Royal Spanish Football Federation) Athletic Bilbao
15	DF	Martín Aguirregabiria	10 May 1996 (aged 23)	1	0	(Royal Spanish Football Federation) Alavés
16	DF	Pol Lirola	13 August 1997 (aged 21)	2	0	(Italian Football Federation) Sassuolo
20	DF	**Junior Firpo** (Note: Capped for Dominican Republic)	22 August 1996 (aged 22)	1	0	(Royal Spanish Football Federation) Real Betis
6	MF	**Fabián Ruiz**	3 April 1996 (aged 23)	10	3	(Italian Football Federation) Napoli
7	MF	**Carlos Soler**	2 January 1997 (aged 22)	16	4	(Royal Spanish Football Federation) Valencia
8	MF	**Mikel Merino**	22 June 1996 (aged 22)	15	4	(Royal Spanish Football Federation) Real Sociedad
10	MF	**Dani Ceballos**	7 August 1996 (aged 22)	24	6	(Royal Spanish Football Federation) Real Madrid
14	MF	Igor Zubeldia	30 March 1997 (aged 22)	3	0	(Royal Spanish Football Federation) Real Sociedad
17	MF	**Alfonso Pedraza**	9 April 1996 (aged 23)	13	0	(Royal Spanish Football Federation) Villarreal
19	MF	**Dani Olmo**	7 May 1998 (aged 21)	6	0	(Croatian Football Federation) Dinamo Zagreb
21	MF	Marc Roca	26 November 1996 (aged 22)	4	1	(Royal Spanish Football Federation) Espanyol
22	MF	**Pablo Fornals**	22 February 1996 (aged 23)	12	0	(Royal Spanish Football Federation) Villarreal
9	FW	Borja Mayoral	5 April 1997 (aged 22)	26	14	(Royal Spanish Football Federation) Levante (on loan from Real Madrid)
11	FW	**Mikel Oyarzabal**	21 April 1997 (aged 22)	20	6	(Royal Spanish Football Federation) Real Sociedad
12	FW	Manu Vallejo	14 February 1997 (aged 22)	2	0	(Royal Spanish Football Federation) Cádiz (on loan from Valencia)
18	FW	Rafa Mir	18 June 1997 (aged 21)	8	5	(Royal Spanish Football Federation) Las Palmas (on loan from Wolverhampton Wanderers)

=== Poland ===
Head coach: Czesław Michniewicz

The final list was published on 5 June 2019.

No.	Pos.	Player	Date of birth (age)	Caps	Goals	Club
1	GK	**Kamil Grabara**	8 January 1999 (aged 20)	9	0	(Danish Football Association) AGF (on loan from Liverpool)
12	GK	Mateusz Lis	27 February 1997 (aged 22)	0	0	(Polish Football Association) Wisła Kraków
22	GK	Tomasz Loska	26 January 1996 (aged 23)	2	0	(Polish Football Association) Górnik Zabrze
3	DF	Kamil Pestka	22 August 1998 (aged 20)	7	0	(Polish Football Association) Chrobry Głogów (on loan from Cracovia)
4	DF	**Mateusz Wieteska**	11 February 1997 (aged 22)	14	2	(Polish Football Association) Legia Warsaw
5	DF	**Paweł Bochniewicz**	30 January 1996 (aged 23)	11	0	(Polish Football Association) Górnik Zabrze (on loan from Udinese)
6	DF	**Krystian Bielik**	4 January 1998 (aged 21)	3	1	(The Football Association) Charlton Athletic (on loan from Arsenal)
15	DF	Dominik Jończy	17 May 1997 (aged 22)	1	0	(Polish Football Association) Podbeskidzie Bielsko-Biała
20	DF	**Robert Gumny**	4 June 1998 (aged 21)	8	0	(Polish Football Association) Lech Poznań
21	DF	Karol Fila	13 June 1998 (aged 21)	2	0	(Polish Football Association) Lechia Gdańsk
2	MF	**Przemysław Płacheta**	23 March 1998 (aged 21)	0	0	(Polish Football Association) Podbeskidzie Bielsko-Biała
7	MF	**Szymon Żurkowski**	25 September 1997 (aged 21)	10	1	(Polish Football Association) Górnik Zabrze (on loan from Fiorentina)
8	MF	**Jakub Piotrowski**	4 October 1997 (aged 21)	10	0	(Royal Belgian Football Association) Genk
10	MF	**Sebastian Szymański**	10 May 1999 (aged 20)	13	2	(Polish Football Association) Legia Warsaw
13	MF	Mateusz Wdowiak	28 August 1996 (aged 22)	2	0	(Polish Football Association) Cracovia
16	MF	Patryk Dziczek	25 March 1998 (aged 21)	11	0	(Polish Football Association) Piast Gliwice
17	MF	**Kamil Jóźwiak**	22 April 1998 (aged 21)	8	0	(Polish Football Association) Lech Poznań
19	MF	Filip Jagiełło	8 August 1997 (aged 21)	7	1	(Polish Football Association) Zagłębie Lubin (on loan from Genoa)
23	MF	Konrad Michalak	19 September 1997 (aged 21)	12	3	(Polish Football Association) Lechia Gdańsk
9	FW	**Dawid Kownacki**	14 March 1997 (aged 22)	20	15	(German Football Association) Fortuna Düsseldorf (on loan from Sampdoria)
11	FW	**Karol Świderski**	23 January 1997 (aged 22)	10	0	(Hellenic Football Federation) PAOK
14	FW	**Adam Buksa**	12 July 1996 (aged 22)	10	2	(Polish Football Association) Pogoń Szczecin
18	FW	Paweł Tomczyk	4 May 1998 (aged 21)	7	3	(Polish Football Association) Piast Gliwice

=== Belgium ===
Head coach: Johan Walem

The squad was published on 4 June 2019.

No.	Pos.	Player	Date of birth (age)	Caps	Goals	Club
1	GK	Nordin Jackers	5 September 1997 (aged 21)	11	0	(Royal Belgian Football Association) Genk
12	GK	Ortwin De Wolf	23 April 1996 (aged 23)	2	0	(Royal Belgian Football Association) Lokeren
21	GK	Jens Teunckens	30 January 1998 (aged 21)	2	0	(Royal Belgian Football Association) Antwerp
2	DF	**Dion Cools** (Note: Capped for Malaysia)	4 June 1996 (aged 23)	15	3	(Royal Belgian Football Association) Club Brugge
3	DF	**Sebastiaan Bornauw**	22 March 1999 (aged 20)	1	0	(Royal Belgian Football Association) Anderlecht
4	DF	**Wout Faes**	3 April 1998 (aged 21)	12	0	(Royal Belgian Football Association) Oostende
5	DF	Casper de Norre	7 February 1997 (aged 22)	7	0	(Royal Belgian Football Association) Genk
13	DF	**Rocky Bushiri** (Note: Capped for DR Congo)	30 November 1999 (aged 19)	4	0	(Royal Belgian Football Association) Eupen
18	DF	Jur Schryvers	11 March 1997 (aged 22)	5	0	(Royal Belgian Football Association) Waasland-Beveren
22	DF	**Elias Cobbaut**	24 November 1997 (aged 21)	7	0	(Royal Belgian Football Association) Anderlecht
6	MF	**Samuel Bastien**	26 September 1996 (aged 22)	11	1	(Royal Belgian Football Association) Standard Liège
8	MF	Bryan Heynen	6 February 1997 (aged 22)	9	0	(Royal Belgian Football Association) Genk
14	MF	Stéphane Oméonga	27 March 1996 (aged 23)	7	0	(Italian Football Federation) Genoa
15	MF	Alexis De Sart	12 November 1996 (aged 22)	12	1	(Royal Belgian Football Association) Sint-Truiden
16	MF	**Yari Verschaeren**	12 July 2001 (aged 17)	0	0	(Royal Belgian Football Association) Anderlecht
17	MF	**Alexis Saelemaekers**	27 June 1999 (aged 19)	5	0	(Royal Belgian Football Association) Anderlecht
20	MF	Dries Wouters	28 January 1997 (aged 22)	8	1	(Royal Belgian Football Association) Genk
23	MF	**Orel Mangala**	18 March 1998 (aged 21)	6	0	(German Football Association) Hamburger SV (on loan from VfB Stuttgart)
7	FW	Isaac Mbenza	8 March 1996 (aged 23)	13	2	(The Football Association) Huddersfield Town
9	FW	Aaron Leya Iseka	15 November 1997 (aged 21)	14	3	(French Football Federation) Toulouse
10	FW	Siebe Schrijvers	18 July 1996 (aged 22)	20	4	(Royal Belgian Football Association) Club Brugge
11	FW	**Dodi Lukébakio** (Note: Previously capped for DR Congo before switching to Belgium)	24 September 1997 (aged 21)	14	4	(German Football Association) Fortuna Düsseldorf (on loan from Watford)
19	FW	Francis Amuzu	23 August 1999 (aged 19)	4	2	(Royal Belgian Football Association) Anderlecht

== Group B ==
=== Germany ===
Head coach: Stefan Kuntz

The 23-man final squad was published on 7 June 2019.

No.	Pos.	Player	Date of birth (age)	Caps	Goals	Club
1	GK	**Alexander Nübel**	30 September 1996 (aged 22)	12	0	(German Football Association) Schalke 04
12	GK	Florian Müller	13 November 1997 (aged 21)	2	0	(German Football Association) Mainz 05
23	GK	Markus Schubert	12 June 1998 (aged 21)	1	0	(German Football Association) Dynamo Dresden
2	DF	**Benjamin Henrichs**	23 February 1997 (aged 22)	13	0	(French Football Federation) Monaco
3	DF	**Lukas Klostermann**	3 June 1996 (aged 23)	17	2	(German Football Association) RB Leipzig
4	DF	**Jonathan Tah**	11 February 1996 (aged 23)	9	0	(German Football Association) Bayer Leverkusen
5	DF	Timo Baumgartl	4 March 1996 (aged 23)	15	1	(German Football Association) VfB Stuttgart
14	DF	**Maximilian Mittelstädt**	18 March 1997 (aged 22)	4	1	(German Football Association) Hertha BSC
15	DF	**Waldemar Anton**	20 July 1996 (aged 22)	11	0	(German Football Association) Hannover 96
17	DF	Felix Uduokhai	9 September 1997 (aged 21)	6	1	(German Football Association) VfL Wolfsburg
20	DF	**Robin Koch**	17 June 1996 (aged 22)	3	0	(German Football Association) SC Freiburg
6	MF	Maximilian Eggestein	8 December 1996 (aged 22)	11	1	(German Football Association) Werder Bremen
7	MF	Levin Öztunalı	15 March 1996 (aged 23)	25	7	(German Football Association) Mainz 05
8	MF	**Mahmoud Dahoud**	1 January 1996 (aged 23)	17	3	(German Football Association) Borussia Dortmund
16	MF	**Suat Serdar**	11 April 1997 (aged 22)	5	2	(German Football Association) Schalke 04
18	MF	**Nadiem Amiri**	27 October 1996 (aged 22)	19	3	(German Football Association) TSG Hoffenheim
19	MF	**Florian Neuhaus**	16 March 1997 (aged 22)	12	1	(German Football Association) Borussia Mönchengladbach
21	MF	Arne Maier	8 January 1999 (aged 20)	5	0	(German Football Association) Hertha BSC
22	MF	Eduard Löwen	28 January 1997 (aged 22)	7	1	(German Football Association) 1. FC Nürnberg
9	FW	**Lukas Nmecha**	14 December 1998 (aged 20)	2	0	(The Football Association) Preston North End (on loan from Manchester City)
10	FW	**Luca Waldschmidt**	19 May 1996 (aged 23)	10	3	(German Football Association) SC Freiburg
11	FW	Marco Richter	24 November 1997 (aged 21)	4	0	(German Football Association) FC Augsburg
13	FW	Johannes Eggestein	8 May 1998 (aged 21)	6	1	(German Football Association) Werder Bremen

=== Denmark ===
Head coach: Niels Frederiksen

The final list was published on 5 June 2019.

No.	Pos.	Player	Date of birth (age)	Caps	Goals	Club
1	GK	Daniel Iversen	19 July 1997 (aged 21)	10	0	(The Football Association) Oldham Athletic (on loan from Leicester City)
16	GK	Peter Vindahl	16 February 1998 (aged 21)	1	0	(Danish Football Association) Nordsjælland
22	GK	Oskar Snorre	26 January 1999 (aged 20)	2	0	(Danish Football Association) Lyngby BK
2	DF	**Rasmus Kristensen**	11 July 1997 (aged 21)	22	7	(Royal Dutch Football Association) Ajax
3	DF	Jacob Rasmussen	28 May 1997 (aged 22)	15	0	(Italian Football Federation) Empoli (on loan from Fiorentina)
4	DF	Jonas Bager	18 July 1996 (aged 22)	7	0	(Danish Football Association) Randers
5	DF	**Victor Nelsson**	14 October 1998 (aged 20)	14	0	(Danish Football Association) Nordsjælland
12	DF	Asger Sørensen	5 June 1996 (aged 23)	7	0	(German Football Association) SSV Jahn Regensburg (on loan from Red Bull Salzburg)
13	DF	Mads Valentin	1 September 1996 (aged 22)	11	0	(Danish Football Association) Nordsjælland
15	DF	**Joakim Mæhle**	20 May 1997 (aged 22)	2	0	(Royal Belgian Football Association) Genk
19	DF	Andreas Poulsen	13 October 1999 (aged 19)	5	0	(German Football Association) Borussia Mönchengladbach
6	MF	**Philip Billing**	11 June 1996 (aged 23)	7	1	(The Football Association) Huddersfield Town
7	MF	Mikkel Duelund	29 June 1997 (aged 21)	20	6	(Ukrainian Association of Football) Dynamo Kyiv
8	MF	**Mathias Jensen**	1 January 1996 (aged 23)	10	2	(Royal Spanish Football Federation) Celta Vigo
10	MF	**Robert Skov**	20 May 1996 (aged 23)	22	10	(Danish Football Association) Copenhagen
11	MF	**Jacob Bruun Larsen**	19 September 1998 (aged 20)	9	3	(German Football Association) Borussia Dortmund
18	MF	**Oliver Abildgaard**	10 June 1996 (aged 23)	8	1	(Danish Football Association) AaB
20	MF	Magnus Kofod Andersen	10 May 1999 (aged 20)	3	0	(Danish Football Association) Nordsjælland
21	MF	**Jens Stage**	8 November 1996 (aged 22)	2	0	(Danish Football Association) AGF
9	FW	**Marcus Ingvartsen**	4 January 1996 (aged 23)	25	17	(Royal Belgian Football Association) Genk
14	FW	**Anders Dreyer**	2 May 1998 (aged 21)	6	0	(Scottish Football Association) St Mirren
17	FW	**Andreas Skov Olsen**	29 December 1999 (aged 19)	5	1	(Danish Football Association) Nordsjælland
23	FW	**Jonas Wind**	7 February 1999 (aged 20)	0	0	(Danish Football Association) Copenhagen

=== Serbia ===
Head coach: Goran Đorović

The 23-man final squad was published on 1 June 2019.

No.	Pos.	Player	Date of birth (age)	Caps	Goals	Club
1	GK	Boris Radunović	16 May 1996 (aged 23)	16	0	(Italian Football Federation) Cremonese (on loan from Atalanta)
12	GK	**Dragan Rosić**	15 November 1996 (aged 22)	2	0	(Football Association of Serbia) Mladost Lučani
23	GK	Miloš Ostojić	21 April 1996 (aged 23)	1	0	(Football Association of Serbia) Spartak Subotica
2	DF	**Milan Gajić**	28 January 1996 (aged 23)	25	2	(Football Association of Serbia) Red Star Belgrade
3	DF	**Aleksa Terzić**	17 August 1999 (aged 19)	4	1	(Football Association of Serbia) Grafičar (on loan from Red Star Belgrade)
4	DF	**Nikola Milenković**	12 October 1997 (aged 21)	7	0	(Italian Football Federation) Fiorentina
5	DF	**Erhan Mašović**	22 November 1998 (aged 20)	11	1	(Slovak Football Association) Trenčín (on loan from Club Brugge)
13	DF	**Miroslav Bogosavac**	14 October 1996 (aged 22)	10	0	(Football Association of Serbia) Čukarički
14	DF	Vukašin Jovanović	17 May 1996 (aged 23)	24	0	(French Football Federation) Bordeaux
15	DF	Svetozar Marković	23 March 2000 (aged 19)	3	0	(Football Association of Serbia) Partizan
16	DF	**Srđan Babić**	22 April 1996 (aged 23)	4	1	(Football Association of Serbia) Red Star Belgrade
6	MF	**Uroš Račić**	17 March 1998 (aged 21)	9	0	(Royal Spanish Football Federation) Tenerife (on loan from Valencia)
8	MF	Danilo Pantić	26 October 1996 (aged 22)	11	3	(Football Association of Serbia) Partizan (on loan from Chelsea)
10	MF	**Andrija Živković** (captain)	11 July 1996 (aged 22)	13	1	(Portuguese Football Federation) Benfica
17	MF	Luka Adžić	17 September 1998 (aged 20)	8	0	(Royal Belgian Football Association) Anderlecht
19	MF	**Lazar Ranđelović**	5 August 1997 (aged 21)	4	2	(Football Association of Serbia) Radnički Niš (on loan from Olympiacos)
20	MF	**Saša Lukić**	13 August 1996 (aged 22)	18	3	(Italian Football Federation) Torino
7	FW	**Nemanja Radonjić**	15 February 1996 (aged 23)	8	0	(French Football Federation) Marseille
9	FW	**Luka Jović**	23 December 1997 (aged 21)	14	7	(German Football Association) Eintracht Frankfurt
11	FW	Ivan Šaponjić	2 August 1997 (aged 21)	10	2	(Portuguese Football Federation) Benfica B
18	FW	**Dejan Joveljić**	7 August 1999 (aged 19)	4	0	(Football Association of Serbia) Red Star Belgrade
21	FW	Igor Zlatanović	10 February 1998 (aged 21)	8	1	(Football Association of Serbia) Radnik Surdulica
22	FW	Aleksandar Lutovac	28 June 1997 (aged 21)	6	4	(Football Association of Serbia) Partizan

=== Austria ===
Head coach: Werner Gregoritsch

The final list was published on 5 June 2019.

No.	Pos.	Player	Date of birth (age)	Caps	Goals	Club
1	GK	Johannes Kreidl	7 March 1996 (aged 23)	2	0	(Austrian Football Association) Ried
12	GK	**Patrick Pentz**	2 January 1997 (aged 22)	1	0	(Austrian Football Association) Austria Wien
23	GK	**Alexander Schlager** (captain)	1 February 1996 (aged 23)	15	0	(Austrian Football Association) LASK
2	DF	**Marco Friedl**	16 March 1998 (aged 21)	13	1	(German Football Association) Werder Bremen (on loan from Bayern Munich)
4	DF	**Stefan Posch**	14 May 1997 (aged 22)	7	1	(German Football Association) TSG Hoffenheim
5	DF	**Philipp Lienhart**	11 July 1996 (aged 22)	27	2	(German Football Association) SC Freiburg
10	DF	Petar Gluhakovic	25 March 1996 (aged 23)	12	0	(Austrian Football Association) Austria Wien
13	DF	**Maximilian Ullmann**	17 June 1996 (aged 22)	13	2	(Austrian Football Association) LASK
15	DF	Dario Maresic	29 September 1999 (aged 19)	10	1	(Austrian Football Association) Sturm Graz
22	DF	Sandro Ingolitsch	18 April 1997 (aged 22)	11	0	(Austrian Football Association) St. Pölten
3	MF	**Emir Karic**	9 June 1997 (aged 22)	2	0	(Austrian Football Association) Altach
6	MF	**Kevin Danso**	19 September 1998 (aged 20)	7	0	(German Football Association) FC Augsburg
8	MF	**Xaver Schlager**	28 September 1997 (aged 21)	6	2	(Austrian Football Association) Red Bull Salzburg
11	MF	Mathias Honsak	20 December 1996 (aged 22)	12	7	(German Football Association) Holstein Kiel (on loan from Red Bull Salzburg)
14	MF	**Husein Balić**	15 July 1996 (aged 22)	0	0	(Austrian Football Association) St. Pölten
17	MF	Ivan Ljubić	7 July 1996 (aged 22)	7	0	(Austrian Football Association) Sturm Graz
18	MF	**Dejan Ljubičić**	8 October 1997 (aged 21)	8	0	(Austrian Football Association) Rapid Wien
19	MF	Hannes Wolf	16 April 1999 (aged 20)	8	1	(Austrian Football Association) Red Bull Salzburg
20	MF	**Christoph Baumgartner**	1 August 1999 (aged 19)	6	0	(German Football Association) TSG Hoffenheim
21	MF	Sascha Horvath	22 August 1996 (aged 22)	17	1	(Austrian Football Association) Wacker Innsbruck (on loan from Dynamo Dresden)
7	FW	**Adrian Grbić**	4 August 1996 (aged 22)	15	5	(Austrian Football Association) Altach
9	FW	Marko Kvasina	20 December 1996 (aged 22)	23	4	(Austrian Football Association) Mattersburg
16	MF	**Saša Kalajdžić**	7 July 1997 (aged 21)	2	0	(Austrian Football Association) Admira Wacker

== Group C ==
=== England ===
Head coach: Aidy Boothroyd

The final squad was named on 27 May 2019.

No.	Pos.	Player	Date of birth (age)	Caps	Goals	Club
1	GK	**Dean Henderson**	12 March 1997 (aged 22)	8	0	(The Football Association) Sheffield United (on loan from Manchester United)
13	GK	**Angus Gunn** (Note: Capped for Scotland)	22 January 1996 (aged 23)	12	0	(The Football Association) Southampton
22	GK	Freddie Woodman	4 March 1997 (aged 22)	6	0	(The Football Association) Newcastle United
2	DF	**Aaron Wan-Bissaka** (Note: Capped for DR Congo)	26 November 1997 (aged 21)	2	0	(The Football Association) Crystal Palace
3	DF	**Jay Dasilva** (Note: Capped for Wales)	22 April 1998 (aged 21)	11	0	(The Football Association) Bristol City (on loan from Chelsea)
4	DF	Jake Clarke-Salter (captain)	22 September 1997 (aged 21)	9	1	(Royal Dutch Football Association) Vitesse (on loan from Chelsea)
5	DF	**Fikayo Tomori**	19 December 1997 (aged 21)	12	0	(The Football Association) Derby County (on loan from Chelsea)
12	DF	Jonjoe Kenny	15 March 1997 (aged 22)	14	0	(The Football Association) Everton
14	DF	Lloyd Kelly	1 October 1998 (aged 20)	3	0	(The Football Association) Bristol City
15	DF	**Ezri Konsa**	23 October 1997 (aged 21)	6	1	(The Football Association) Brentford
6	MF	Kieran Dowell	10 October 1997 (aged 21)	14	2	(The Football Association) Sheffield United (on loan from Everton)
8	MF	**James Maddison**	23 November 1996 (aged 22)	6	0	(The Football Association) Leicester City
10	MF	**Phil Foden**	28 May 2000 (aged 19)	6	0	(The Football Association) Manchester City
11	MF	Ryan Sessegnon	18 May 2000 (aged 19)	8	0	(The Football Association) Fulham
16	MF	**Hamza Choudhury** (Note: Capped for Bangladesh)	1 October 1997 (aged 21)	5	0	(The Football Association) Leicester City
17	MF	**Harvey Barnes**	9 December 1997 (aged 21)	3	0	(The Football Association) Leicester City
18	MF	**Mason Mount**	10 January 1999 (aged 20)	1	1	(The Football Association) Derby County (on loan from Chelsea)
20	MF	**Morgan Gibbs-White**	27 January 2000 (aged 19)	0	0	(The Football Association) Wolverhampton Wanderers
7	FW	**Demarai Gray** (Note: Capped for Jamaica)	28 June 1996 (aged 22)	23	7	(The Football Association) Leicester City
9	FW	**Dominic Solanke**	14 September 1997 (aged 21)	17	9	(The Football Association) Bournemouth
19	FW	**Dominic Calvert-Lewin**	16 March 1997 (aged 22)	15	7	(The Football Association) Everton
21	FW	Reiss Nelson	10 December 1999 (aged 19)	5	2	(German Football Association) TSG Hoffenheim (on loan from Arsenal)
23	FW	**Tammy Abraham**	2 October 1997 (aged 21)	23	8	(The Football Association) Aston Villa (on loan from Chelsea)

=== France ===
Head coach: Sylvain Ripoll

The final squad, along with twelve reserve players, was announced on 22 May 2019. Martin Terrier had an injury and was thus replaced by Marcus Thuram.

No.	Pos.	Player	Date of birth (age)	Caps	Goals	Club
1	GK	Gautier Larsonneur	23 February 1997 (aged 22)	2	0	(French Football Federation) Brest
16	GK	Maxence Prévot	9 April 1997 (aged 22)	1	0	(French Football Federation) Sochaux
23	GK	Paul Bernardoni	18 April 1997 (aged 22)	14	0	(French Football Federation) Nîmes
2	DF	Kelvin Amian	8 February 1998 (aged 21)	12	0	(French Football Federation) Toulouse
3	DF	**Fodé Ballo-Touré** (Note: Capped for Senegal)	3 January 1997 (aged 22)	7	0	(French Football Federation) Monaco
4	DF	**Ibrahima Konaté**	25 May 1999 (aged 20)	4	0	(German Football Association) RB Leipzig
5	DF	**Dayot Upamecano**	27 October 1998 (aged 20)	9	0	(German Football Association) RB Leipzig
13	DF	Colin Dagba	9 September 1998 (aged 20)	1	0	(French Football Federation) Paris Saint-Germain
15	DF	Malang Sarr	23 January 1999 (aged 20)	6	0	(French Football Federation) Nice
17	DF	**Moussa Niakhaté**	8 March 1996 (aged 23)	11	0	(German Football Association) Mainz 05
19	DF	Anthony Caci	1 July 1997 (aged 21)	2	0	(French Football Federation) Strasbourg
6	MF	Lucas Tousart (captain)	29 April 1997 (aged 22)	20	0	(French Football Federation) Lyon
7	MF	Romain Del Castillo	29 March 1996 (aged 23)	8	0	(French Football Federation) Rennes
8	MF	**Houssem Aouar** (Note: Previously capped for France before switching to Algeria)	30 June 1998 (aged 20)	11	2	(French Football Federation) Lyon
10	MF	**Mattéo Guendouzi**	14 April 1999 (aged 20)	6	0	(The Football Association) Arsenal
18	MF	**Ibrahima Sissoko** (Note: Capped for Mali)	27 October 1997 (aged 21)	4	0	(French Football Federation) Strasbourg
21	MF	**Olivier Ntcham** (Note: Capped for Cameroon)	9 February 1996 (aged 23)	17	1	(Scottish Football Association) Celtic
22	MF	Jeff Reine-Adélaïde	17 January 1998 (aged 21)	8	3	(French Football Federation) Angers
9	FW	Moussa Dembélé	12 July 1996 (aged 22)	22	12	(French Football Federation) Lyon
11	FW	**Jean-Philippe Mateta**	28 June 1997 (aged 21)	8	1	(German Football Association) Mainz 05
12	FW	**Jonathan Ikoné**	2 May 1998 (aged 21)	7	1	(French Football Federation) Lille
14	FW	**Jonathan Bamba** (Note: Capped for Ivory Coast)	26 March 1996 (aged 23)	20	5	(French Football Federation) Lille
20	FW	**Marcus Thuram**	6 August 1997 (aged 21)	1	0	(French Football Federation) Guingamp

=== Romania ===
Head coach: Mirel Radoi

The following players were named to the squad on 28 May 2019 by coach Mirel Radoi, at an official press conference. Denis Drăguș had an injury and Ricardo Grigore was thus called in his place.

No.	Pos.	Player	Date of birth (age)	Caps	Goals	Club
1	GK	**Andrei Radu**	28 May 1997 (aged 22)	12	0	(Italian Football Federation) Genoa (on loan from Inter Milan)
12	GK	Cătălin Căbuz	18 June 1996 (aged 22)	0	0	(Romanian Football Federation) Hermannstadt (on loan from Viitorul Constanța)
23	GK	**Andrei Vlad**	15 April 1999 (aged 20)	0	0	(Romanian Football Federation) FCSB
2	DF	Radu Boboc	24 April 1999 (aged 20)	4	0	(Romanian Football Federation) Viitorul Constanța
3	DF	**Florin Ștefan**	9 May 1996 (aged 23)	7	0	(Romanian Football Federation) Sepsi OSK
4	DF	**Alex Pașcanu**	28 September 1998 (aged 20)	12	0	(The Football Association) Leicester City
5	DF	**Ionuț Nedelcearu**	25 April 1996 (aged 23)	15	1	(Russian Football Union) Ufa
6	DF	**Cristian Manea**	9 August 1997 (aged 21)	15	0	(Romanian Football Federation) CFR Cluj (on loan from Apollon Limassol)
13	DF	Ricardo Grigore	7 April 1999 (aged 20)	0	0	(Romanian Football Federation) Dinamo București
15	DF	**Virgil Ghiță**	4 June 1998 (aged 21)	2	0	(Romanian Football Federation) Viitorul Constanța
18	DF	**Adrian Rus**	18 March 1996 (aged 23)	4	0	(Romanian Football Federation) Sepsi Sfântu Gheorghe
7	MF	**Florinel Coman**	10 April 1998 (aged 21)	10	1	(Romanian Football Federation) FCSB
8	MF	**Dennis Man**	26 August 1998 (aged 20)	8	3	(Romanian Football Federation) FCSB
10	MF	**Ianis Hagi**	22 October 1998 (aged 20)	10	2	(Romanian Football Federation) Viitorul Constanța
14	MF	**Vlad Dragomir**	24 April 1999 (aged 20)	1	0	(Italian Football Federation) Perugia
16	MF	**Dragoș Nedelcu**	16 February 1997 (aged 22)	21	0	(Romanian Football Federation) FCSB
17	MF	**Alexandru Cicâldău**	8 July 1997 (aged 21)	9	2	(Romanian Football Federation) CSU Craiova
20	MF	Andrei Ciobanu	18 January 1998 (aged 21)	6	0	(Romanian Football Federation) Viitorul Constanța
21	MF	**Tudor Băluță**	27 March 1999 (aged 20)	0	0	(Romanian Football Federation) Viitorul Constanța (on loan from Brighton)
22	MF	**Darius Olaru**	3 March 1998 (aged 21)	1	0	(Romanian Football Federation) Gaz Metan Mediaș
9	FW	**George Pușcaș**	8 April 1996 (aged 23)	21	14	(Italian Football Federation) Palermo
11	FW	Adrian Petre	11 February 1998 (aged 21)	4	2	(Danish Football Association) Esbjerg
19	FW	**Andrei Ivan**	4 January 1997 (aged 22)	7	1	(Russian Football Union) Krasnodar

=== Croatia ===
Head coach: Nenad Gračan

The final list was published on 5 June 2019.

No.	Pos.	Player	Date of birth (age)	Caps	Goals	Club
1	GK	**Ivo Grbić**	18 January 1996 (aged 23)	3	0	(Croatian Football Federation) Lokomotiva
12	GK	Josip Posavec	10 March 1996 (aged 23)	12	0	(Croatian Football Federation) Hajduk Split
23	GK	Adrian Šemper	12 January 1998 (aged 21)	1	0	(Italian Football Federation) Chievo (on loan from Dinamo Zagreb)
2	DF	**Filip Uremović**	11 February 1997 (aged 22)	5	2	(Russian Football Union) Rubin Kazan
3	DF	**Borna Sosa**	21 January 1998 (aged 21)	11	0	(German Football Association) VfB Stuttgart
5	DF	**Nikola Katić** (Note: Previously capped for Croatia before switching to Bosnia and Herzegovina)	10 October 1996 (aged 22)	3	0	(Scottish Football Association) Rangers
6	DF	**Filip Benković**	13 July 1997 (aged 21)	2	0	(Scottish Football Association) Celtic (on loan from Leicester City)
15	DF	Branimir Kalaica	1 June 1998 (aged 21)	1	1	(Portuguese Football Federation) Benfica B
16	DF	Toni Borevković	18 June 1997 (aged 21)	1	0	(Portuguese Football Federation) Rio Ave
21	DF	**Domagoj Bradarić**	10 December 1999 (aged 19)	2	0	(Croatian Football Federation) Hajduk Split
22	DF	Marijan Čabraja	25 February 1997 (aged 22)	1	0	(Croatian Football Federation) Gorica
4	MF	**Ivan Šunjić**	9 October 1996 (aged 22)	12	1	(Croatian Football Federation) Dinamo Zagreb
8	MF	**Nikola Vlašić**	4 October 1997 (aged 21)	15	5	(Russian Football Union) CSKA Moscow
10	MF	**Alen Halilović** (captain)	18 June 1996 (aged 22)	15	4	(Royal Belgian Football Association) Standard Liège (on loan from Milan)
11	MF	**Luka Ivanušec**	26 November 1998 (aged 20)	9	0	(Croatian Football Federation) Lokomotiva
13	MF	**Lovro Majer**	17 January 1998 (aged 21)	5	0	(Croatian Football Federation) Dinamo Zagreb
14	MF	Kristijan Bistrović	9 April 1998 (aged 21)	1	0	(Russian Football Union) CSKA Moscow
17	MF	**Toma Bašić**	25 November 1996 (aged 22)	6	0	(French Football Federation) Bordeaux
20	MF	**Nikola Moro**	12 March 1998 (aged 21)	7	1	(Croatian Football Federation) Dinamo Zagreb
7	FW	**Josip Brekalo**	23 June 1998 (aged 20)	13	7	(German Football Association) VfL Wolfsburg
9	FW	Marin Jakoliš	26 December 1996 (aged 22)	12	5	(Austrian Football Association) Admira Wacker
18	FW	Robert Murić	12 March 1996 (aged 23)	1	0	(Croatian Football Federation) Rijeka
19	FW	Sandro Kulenović	4 December 1999 (aged 19)	1	0	(Polish Football Association) Legia Warsaw
