= Luis de la Fuente (footballer, born 1961) =

Spanish football manager (born 1961)

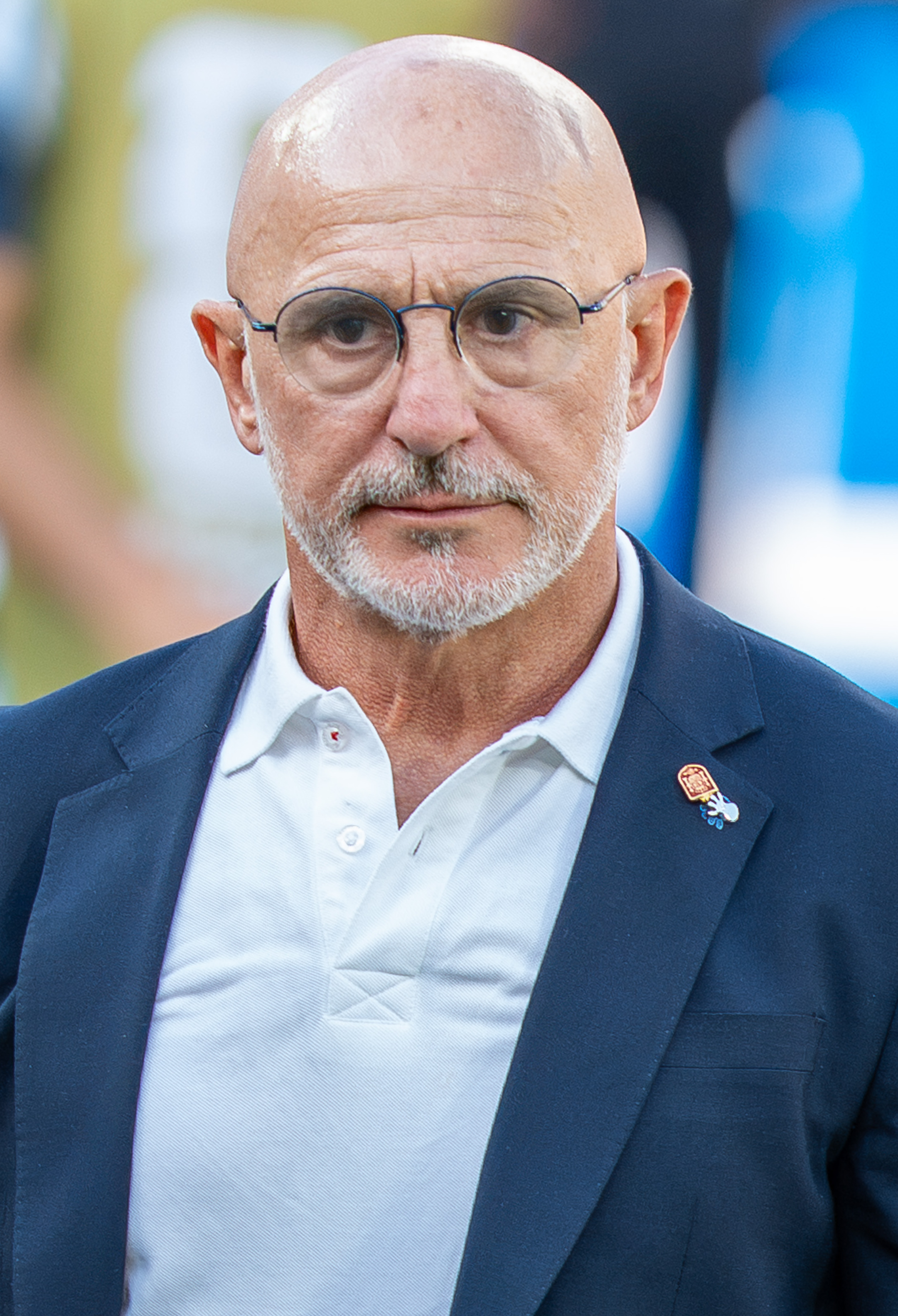
- De la Fuente in 2026

Personal information
- Full name: Luis de la Fuente Castillo
- Date of birth: 21 June 1961 (age 65)
- Place of birth: Haro, Spain
- Height: 1.72 m (5 ft 8 in)
- Position: Left-back

Team information
- Current team: Spain (manager)

Youth career
- 1976–1978: Athletic Bilbao

Senior career*
Years	Team	Apps	(Gls)
1978–1982	Bilbao Athletic	59	(3)
1981–1987	Athletic Bilbao	146	(1)
1987–1991	Sevilla	86	(4)
1991–1993	Athletic Bilbao	22	(1)
1993–1994	Alavés	35	(3)
Total		348	(12)

International career
1978–1979	Spain U18	4	(0)
1982–1984	Spain U21	4	(0)
1988	Spain Olympic	1	(0)

Managerial career
- 1997–2000: Portugalete
- 2000–2001: Aurrerá
- 2006–2007: Bilbao Athletic
- 2009–2011: Bilbao Athletic
- 2011: Alavés
- 2013–2018: Spain U19
- 2018–2022: Spain U21
- 2021: Spain Olympic
- 2022–: Spain
Medal record
Men's football
Representing Spain (as manager)
FIFA World Cup
Winner	2026 Canada–Mexico–US
UEFA European Championship
Winner	2024 Germany
UEFA Nations League
Winner	2023 Netherlands
Runner-up	2025 Germany
Olympic Games
Silver medal – second place	Tokyo 2020	Team
UEFA European Under-21 Championship
Winner	2019 Italy–San Marino
UEFA European Under-19 Championship
Winner	2015 Greece
- * Club domestic league appearances and goals

Luis de la Fuente Castillo (born 21 June 1961) is a Spanish professional football manager and former player who played as a left-back. He is the manager of the Spain national team.

He amassed La Liga totals of 254 matches and six goals over 13 seasons, with Athletic Bilbao and Sevilla, winning two league titles with the former including a double with the Copa del Rey in 1984.

De la Fuente began working with Spanish youth teams in 2013, managing the under-19s to victory in the 2015 European Championship and the under-21 side to the 2019 equivalent. He coached the Olympic team to the silver medal at the 2020 games and took over his country's seniors in 2022, winning the 2023 Nations League, Euro 2024 and the 2026 World Cup, becoming the first manager to claim all three major trophies.

== Playing career ==
Born in Haro, La Rioja, de la Fuente graduated from Athletic Bilbao's youth system, and made his senior debut with the reserves in 1978, in the Segunda División B. On 8 March 1981, he made his first-team – and La Liga – debut, coming on as a second-half substitute in a 0–0 away draw against Valencia.

De la Fuente was promoted to the main squad in the summer of 1982. He scored his first professional goal on 26 March 1983, closing the 4–0 home win over Celta de Vigo.

In July 1987, de la Fuente signed for fellow top-flight club Sevilla, and continued to appear regularly the following campaigns in defence or as a left winger. In 1991, he returned to Athletic for a 20 million pesetas fee, featuring rarely under coach Jupp Heynckes who arrived one year later.

De la Fuente joined Alavés in 1993, with the side in the third tier. After one season, he retired at the age of 33.

De la Fuente earned caps for Spain at youth level. He also represented the under-23 side in qualification for the 1988 Summer Olympics.

== Coaching career ==
=== Early years ===
De la Fuente's first managerial job was at Portugalete in the regional leagues. In summer 2000, he was appointed at Segunda División B club Aurrerá de Vitoria, but was sacked in March of the following year in spite of a seventh place in the table.

After a spell back at Sevilla (academy), de la Fuente returned to Athletic. Initially a manager of the youths and the reserves, he also acted as match delegate for two years before returning to his previous duties.

On 13 July 2011, de la Fuente was named Alavés coach, being dismissed on 17 October.

=== Spain youths ===
On 5 May 2013, de la Fuente was appointed at the helm of the Spain under-19 team, who won the 2015 UEFA European Championship in Greece. He became manager of the under-21 side in July 2018, after Albert Celades resigned. His first competition was the 2019 European Championship in Italy, conquered after the 2–1 final defeat of Germany in Udine.

On 8 June 2021, de la Fuente and his team filled in as the Spain senior side for a UEFA Euro 2020 friendly against Lithuania, after the aforementioned squad had gone into isolation when Sergio Busquets tested positive for COVID-19. They won 4–0 in Leganés.

De la Fuente was also in charge of the Spanish Olympic team at the delayed 2020 Olympic Games in Tokyo. His side won the silver medal, losing 2–1 to Brazil in the final.

=== Spain senior ===
On 8 December 2022, de la Fuente was appointed head coach of the senior side, as Luis Enrique resigned following a round of 16 penalty shootout elimination at the 2022 FIFA World Cup by Morocco. He was officially presented four days later, with a contract running until UEFA Euro 2024 with the option to be extended.

De la Fuente won 3–0 in a European qualifier at home to Norway in his first game on 25 March 2023, with two goals by 32-year-old debutant Joselu. He led the country to victory in the 2022–23 UEFA Nations League (a first ever), defeating Croatia 5–4 on penalties following a 0–0 draw in Rotterdam.

Spain finished the Euro 2024 group stage in first place, scoring five goals and conceding none. De la Fuente's side went on to claim the trophy in Berlin with seven wins in as many matches, beating England 2–1 in the final.

In January 2025, de la Fuente extended his contract until the end of Euro 2028. After finishing first in qualification for the 2026 World Cup, the team topped Group H in the finals and eventually reached the final, their first since 2010, with 13 goals for and only one against, scored by Belgium's Charles De Ketelaere in the quarter-finals. In the final, Spain defeated Argentina 1–0 after extra time to win their second World Cup, with him becoming the oldest manager to win the tournament at 65 years and 28 days old, surpassing the previous record held by his compatriot Vicente del Bosque. Starting in March 2024, he guided his side to an all-time world record for the longest undefeated streak in men's international football, 43 consecutive matches without a loss in regulation time, including all at his first European Championship and World Cup tournaments.

On 21 September 2026, the Royal Spanish Football Federation announced that de la Fuente had agreed to a new deal, running until Euro 2032; he reportedly earned an annual salary of €5 million, being one of the highest-paid national team coaches in the world.

== Style of coaching ==
Due to his background coaching in youth setups, de la Fuente liked to work with younger players familiar to him and not high-maintenance. Mikel Merino, Dani Olmo, Mikel Oyarzabal, Fabián Ruiz and Unai Simón won the under-21 European championship title during his tenure, and later represented the full team under the same manager. He explained his philosophy by stating that "I come from a grassroots background. Our commitment, to the people we trust in the youth system, is not a pose, it is a conviction".

Spain often dominated possession under de la Fuente, also starting to use a more traditional centre-forward and delivering more crosses to the box.

== Personal life ==
De la Fuente married a woman from Andalusia, with whom he had three children. One son, Alberto, was also involved in the sport, and at one point worked with his father in the Spanish Federation as an analyst.

Raised Catholic yet lapsed for some time, de la Fuente ultimately embraced the religion again in adulthood.

== Managerial statistics ==
As of match played 15 November 2026

Managerial record by team and tenure
Team	Nat.	From	To	Record								Ref.
Team	Nat.	From	To	G	W	D	L	GF	GA	GD	Win %	Ref.
Portugalete	(Spain)	1 July 1997	30 June 2000	122	69	34	19	231	104	+127	56.56	
Aurrerá	(Spain)	1 July 2000	14 March 2001	32	11	13	8	29	25	+4	34.38	
Bilbao Athletic	(Spain)	8 July 2006	28 May 2007	38	11	12	15	39	49	−10	28.95	
Bilbao Athletic	(Spain)	8 July 2009	7 July 2011	76	21	29	26	64	79	−15	27.63	
Alavés	(Spain)	13 July 2011	17 October 2011	11	4	4	3	15	13	+2	36.36	
Spain U19	(Spain)	5 May 2013	24 July 2018	51	36	6	9	90	48	+42	70.59	
Spain U21	(Spain)	24 July 2018	8 December 2022	42	34	4	4	113	24	+89	80.95	
Spain U23	(Spain)	1 June 2021	7 August 2021	7	3	3	1	10	6	+4	42.86	
Spain	(Spain)	8 December 2022	Present	55	42	10	3	142	43	+99	76.36	
Career Total				434	231	115	88	733	391	+342	53.23	

== Honours ==
=== Player ===
Athletic Bilbao

- La Liga: 1982–83, 1983–84
- Copa del Rey: 1983–84
- Supercopa de España: 1984 (automatically awarded after winning the double)

=== Manager ===
Spain U19

- UEFA European Under-19 Championship: 2015

Spain U21

- UEFA European Under-21 Championship: 2019

Spain U23

- Summer Olympics silver medal: 2020

Spain

- FIFA World Cup: 2026
- UEFA European Championship: 2024
- UEFA Nations League: 2022–23; runner-up: 2024–25

Individual

- IFFHS World's Best Men's National Coach: 2024, 2025
- Johan Cruyff Trophy: 2026
