= 2019 UEFA European Under-21 Championship final =

2019 UEFA European Under-21 Championship Final
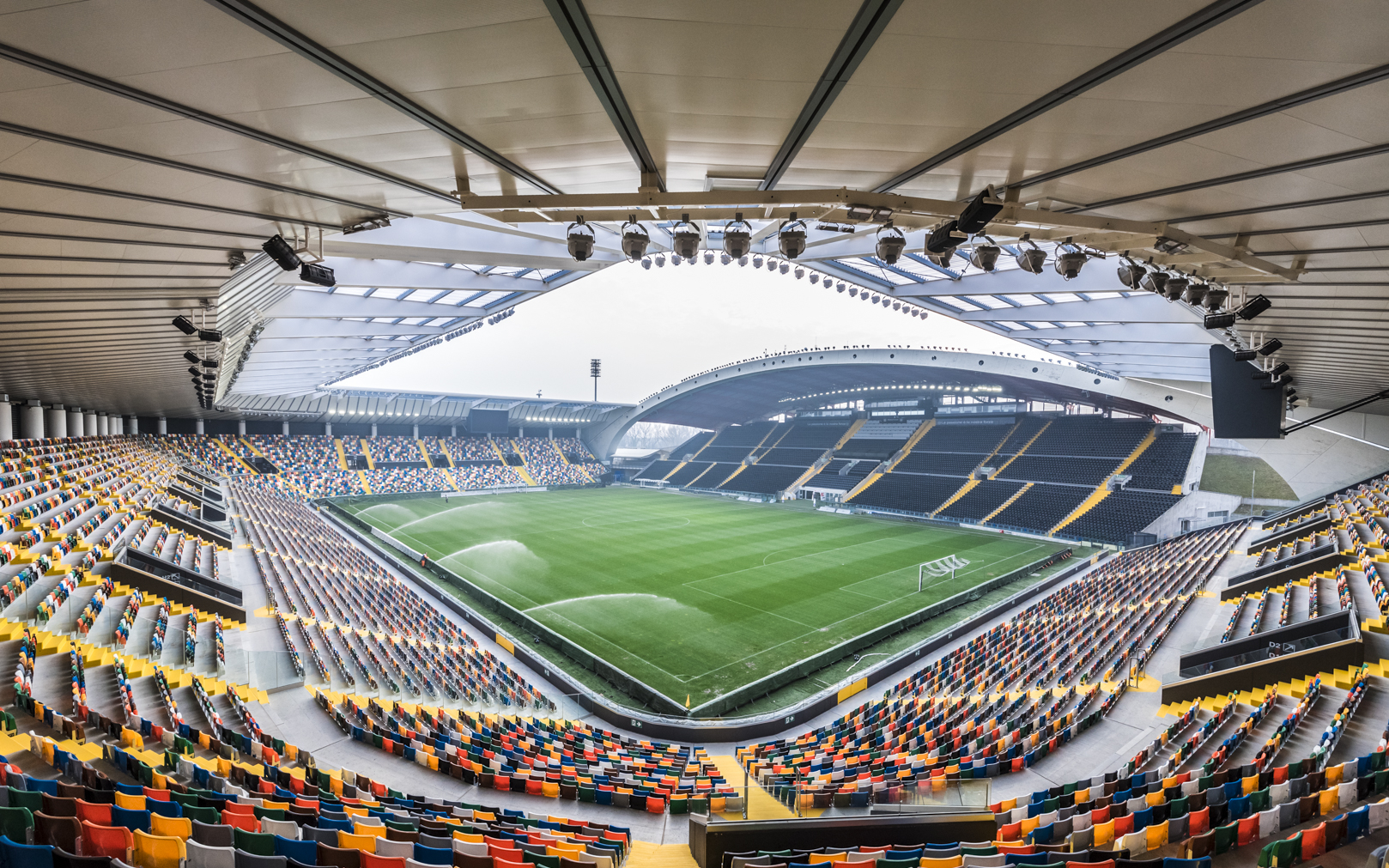
- The Dacia Arena in Udine hosted the final.
- Event: 2019 UEFA European Under-21 Championship
Spain	Germany
(Spain)	(Germany)
2	1
- Date: 30 June 2019
- Venue: Dacia Arena, Udine
- Man of the Match: Dani Olmo (Spain)
- Referee: Srđan Jovanović (Serbia)
- Attendance: 23,232
- Weather: Sunny; 30 °C (86 °F); 69% humidity

The 2019 UEFA European Under-21 Championship Final was a football match that took place on 30 June 2019 at the Dacia Arena in Udine, Italy, to determine the winners of the 2019 UEFA European Under-21 Championship. The match was contested by Spain and Germany, the defending champions of the competition, making the fixture a rematch of the previous final.

Spain won the final 2–1 for their fifth UEFA European Under-21 Championship title, equalling Italy's record.

== Route to the final ==
Spain
Round
Germany
Opponents
Result
Group stage
Opponents
Result
Italy
1–3
Match 1
Denmark
3–1
Belgium
2–1
Match 2
Serbia
6–1
Poland
5–0
Match 3
Austria
1–1
Group A winners

Pos	Team	Pld	Pts
1	Spain	3	6
2	Italy (H)	3	6
3	Poland	3	6
4	Belgium	3	0

Source: UEFA
(H) Hosts
Final standings
Group B winners

Pos	Team	Pld	Pts
1	Germany	3	7
2	Denmark	3	6
3	Austria	3	4
4	Serbia	3	0

Source: UEFA
Opponents
Result
Knockout stage
Opponents
Result
France
4–1
Semi-finals
Romania
4–2

== Match ==
=== Details ===
30 June 2019
20:45 CEST

Spain	2–1	Germany
Fabián 7'; Olmo 69'	Report	Amiri 88'

Dacia Arena, Udine
Attendance: 23,232
Referee: Srđan Jovanović (Serbia)

Spain	Germany

GK	1	Antonio Sivera	(yellow card) 83'
RB	15	Martín Aguirregabiria
CB	5	Unai Núñez	(yellow card) 71'
CB	2	Jesús Vallejo (c)	(yellow card) 33'
LB	20	Junior Firpo
CM	21	Marc Roca
CM	6	Fabián Ruiz		(substituted off) 78'
RW	19	Dani Olmo
AM	10	Dani Ceballos
LW	22	Pablo Fornals		(substituted off) 72'
CF	11	Mikel Oyarzabal		(substituted off) 55'
Substitutions:
MF	7	Carlos Soler		(substituted on) 55'
FW	9	Borja Mayoral		(substituted on) 72'
MF	8	Mikel Merino		(substituted on) 78'
Manager:
Luis de la Fuente

GK	1	Alexander Nübel
RB	3	Lukas Klostermann
CB	4	Jonathan Tah (c)
CB	5	Timo Baumgartl
LB	2	Benjamin Henrichs
CM	16	Suat Serdar	(substituted off) 61'
CM	6	Maximilian Eggestein	(substituted off) 78'
CM	8	Mahmoud Dahoud
RF	7	Levin Öztunalı	(substituted off) 72'
CF	10	Luca Waldschmidt
LF	18	Nadiem Amiri
Substitutions:
MF	19	Florian Neuhaus	(substituted on) 61'
FW	11	Marco Richter	(substituted on) 72'
FW	9	Lukas Nmecha	(substituted on) 78'
Manager:
Stefan Kuntz

Man of the Match:
Dani Olmo (Spain)

Assistant referees:
Uroš Stojković (Serbia)
Milan Mihajlović (Serbia)
Fourth official:
Serdar Gözübüyük (Netherlands)
Video assistant referee:
Jochem Kamphuis (Netherlands)
Assistant video assistant referee:
Bas Nijhuis (Netherlands)

Match rules

- 90 minutes.
- 30 minutes of extra time if necessary.
- Penalty shoot-out if scores still level.
- Maximum of twelve named substitutes.
- Maximum of three substitutions, with a fourth allowed in extra time.
