= Football at the 2020 Summer Olympics – Men's tournament final =

2020 Summer Olympic men's football final
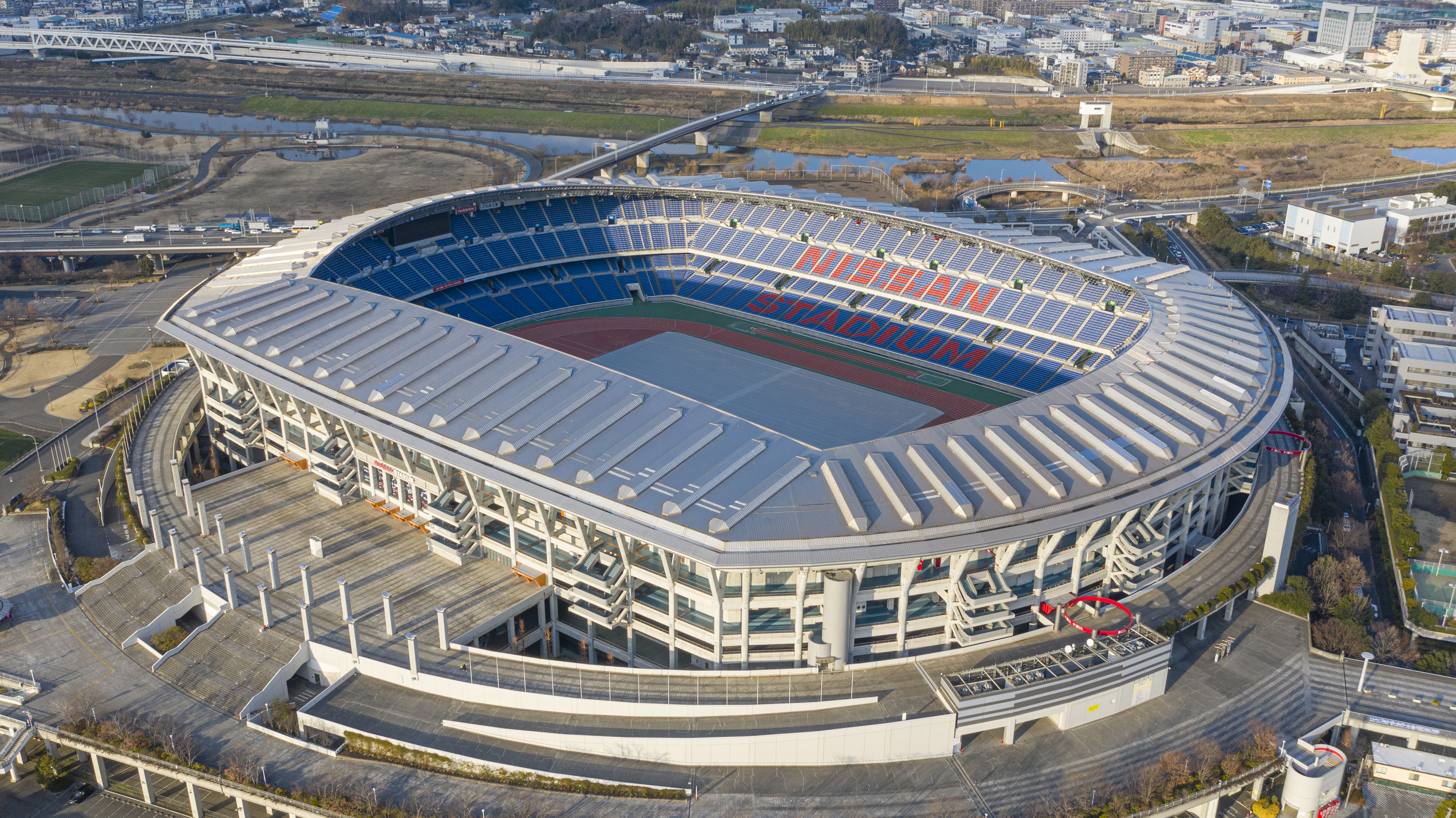
- International Stadium Yokohama in Yokohama hosted the final
- Event: Football at the 2020 Summer Olympics – Men's tournament
Brazil	Spain
(Brazil)	(Spain)
2	1
- After extra time
- Date: 7 August 2021
- Venue: International Stadium Yokohama, Yokohama
- Referee: Chris Beath (Australia)
- Attendance: 0 (Note: Played behind closed doors due to the COVID-19 pandemic in Japan)
- Weather: Overcast; 27 °C (81 °F); 92% humidity

The 2020 Summer Olympic football gold medal match was a football match to determine the gold medal winners of men's football tournament at the 2020 Summer Olympics. The match was the 25th final of the men's football tournament at the Olympics, a quadrennial tournament contested by the men's national teams of the member associations of FIFA to decide the Olympic champions. The match was held at International Stadium Yokohama in Yokohama, Japan, on 7 August 2021. It was played between the defending champions Brazil and Spain.

== Background ==
Since the Olympic men's football was restricted to an under-23 tournament in 1992, Brazil had played in two gold medal matches, losing to Mexico in 2012 before prevailing at home in 2016. Spain also had played twice in such occasion, winning in 1992 – also when they hosted the Olympics – and losing to Cameroon in 2000.

Albeit this was the first meeting between Brazil and Spain at the Olympic gold medal match, their senior and age-group teams had met in many finals before. The senior met in the 2013 FIFA Confederations Cup Final, in which Brazil beat the then-world champions 3–0. The two countries also met in the 1985 and 2003 FIFA World Youth Championships, as well as the final of the 2003 FIFA U-17 World Championship; Brazil won in all occasions.

== Venue ==
The final was held at the International Stadium Yokohama in Yokohama, located in the Kanagawa Prefecture.

The stadium had hosted numerous international sporting events. It hosted a semi-final and the final of the 2001 FIFA Confederations Cup, as well as three matches of the 2002 FIFA World Cup including the final; Brazil's senior team won the latter.

== Referee ==
The referee in charge of the match was Australian Chris Beath, a native of Queensland, who had officiated two previous matches in the tournament; Group A match between Mexico and France and quarter final match between Brazil and Egypt. Beath had two assistant linesmen also from Australia.

== Route to the final ==
Brazil
Round
Spain
Opponent
Result
Group stage
Opponent
Result
Germany
4–2
Match 1
Egypt
0–0
Ivory Coast
0–0
Match 2
Australia
1–0
Saudi Arabia
3–1
Match 3
Argentina
1–1
Group D winners

Pos	Team	Pld	Pts
1	Brazil	3	7
2	Ivory Coast	3	5
3	Germany	3	4
4	Saudi Arabia	3	0

Source: TOCOG and FIFA
Final standings
Group C winners

Pos	Team	Pld	Pts
1	Spain	3	5
2	Egypt	3	4
3	Argentina	3	4
4	Australia	3	3

Source: TOCOG and FIFA
Opponent
Result
Knockout stage
Opponent
Result
Egypt
1–0
Quarter-finals
Ivory Coast
5–2 (a.e.t.)
Mexico
0–0 (a.e.t.) (4–1 p)
Semi-finals
Japan
1–0 (a.e.t.)

== Match details ==
7 August 2021
20:30 JST

Brazil	2–1 (a.e.t.)	Spain
Cunha 45+2'; Malcom 108'	Report (TOCOG); Report (FIFA)	Oyarzabal 61'

International Stadium Yokohama, Yokohama
Attendance: 0
Referee: Chris Beath (Australia)

Brazil	Spain

GK	1	Aderbar Santos
RB	13	Dani Alves (c)
CB	15	Nino
CB	3	Diego Carlos
LB	6	Guilherme Arana	(yellow card) 20'
CM	8	Bruno Guimarães
CM	5	Douglas Luiz	(yellow card) 89'
RW	11	Antony		(substituted off) 112'
AM	20	Claudinho		(substituted off) 106'
LW	9	Matheus Cunha	(yellow card) 64'	(substituted off) 91'
CF	10	Richarlison	(yellow card) 31'	(substituted off) 114'
Substitutes:
GK	12	Brenno
DF	4	Ricardo Graça
MF	2	Gabriel Menino		(substituted on) 112'
MF	18	Matheus Henrique
MF	19	Reinier		(substituted on) 106'
FW	7	Paulinho		(substituted on) 114'
FW	17	Malcom		(substituted on) 91'
Head coach:
André Jardine

GK	1	Unai Simón
RB	18	Óscar Gil		(substituted off) 91'
CB	12	Eric García	(yellow card) 27'
CB	4	Pau Torres
LB	3	Marc Cucurella		(substituted off) 91'
DM	6	Martín Zubimendi		(substituted off) 112'
CM	8	Mikel Merino (c)		(substituted off) 46'
CM	16	Pedri
RF	7	Marco Asensio		(substituted off) 46'
CF	11	Mikel Oyarzabal		(substituted off) 104'
LF	19	Dani Olmo
Substitutes:
GK	13	Álvaro Fernández
DF	5	Jesús Vallejo		(substituted on) 91'
DF	20	Juan Miranda		(substituted on) 91'
MF	14	Carlos Soler		(substituted on) 46'
MF	15	Jon Moncayola		(substituted on) 112'
MF	21	Bryan Gil	(yellow card) 105+1'	(substituted on) 46'
FW	9	Rafa Mir		(substituted on) 104'
Head coach:
Luis de la Fuente

Assistant referees:
Anton Schetinin (Australia)
George Lakrindis (Australia)
Fourth official:
Artur Soares Dias (Portugal)
Reserve assistant referee:
Rui Tavares (Portugal)
Video assistant referee:
Abdulla Al-Marri (Qatar)
Assistant video assistant referees:
Muhammad Taqi (Singapore)
Chris Penso (United States)

== Post-match ==
Following the final, Brazil became only the fifth team to retain the Olympic title in men's football, after Great Britain, Uruguay, Hungary, and Argentina. In winning the tournament, Brazil's captain Dani Alves extended his own record of being the most decorated footballer in history with 43 career team honours.
