= Andy Bara =

Croatian footballer

Personal information
- Birth name: Andy Valentić Bara
- Date of birth: 7 December 1982 (age 43)
- Place of birth: Zagreb, SR Croatia, Yugoslavia
- Height: 1.91 m (6 ft 3 in)
- Position: Defender

Youth career
- Dinamo Zagreb
- Valencia

Senior career*
Years	Team	Apps	(Gls)
–2003	Logroñés	0	(0)
2003–2004	Legia Warsaw	0	(0)
2003–2004	→ Świt NDM (loan)	3	(0)
2004	Delta Warsaw		
- * Club domestic league appearances and goals

Andy Bara (born 7 December 1982) is a Croatian football agent. He's a former professional footballer who briefly played in the Ekstraklasa for Świt Nowy Dwór Mazowiecki.

In 2011, Bara started a sports agency and brought Dani Olmo to Dinamo Zagreb from FC Barcelona.

Bara has also represented Marcelo Brozović.

Bara has negotiated a transfer of 17-year-old Croatian striker Dino Klapija from NK Kustosija Zagreb to RB Leipzig for a sum of €5.2m. Klapija will be loaned back to NK Kustosija until the summer of 2024.
