= Dani Olmo =

Spanish footballer (born 1998)

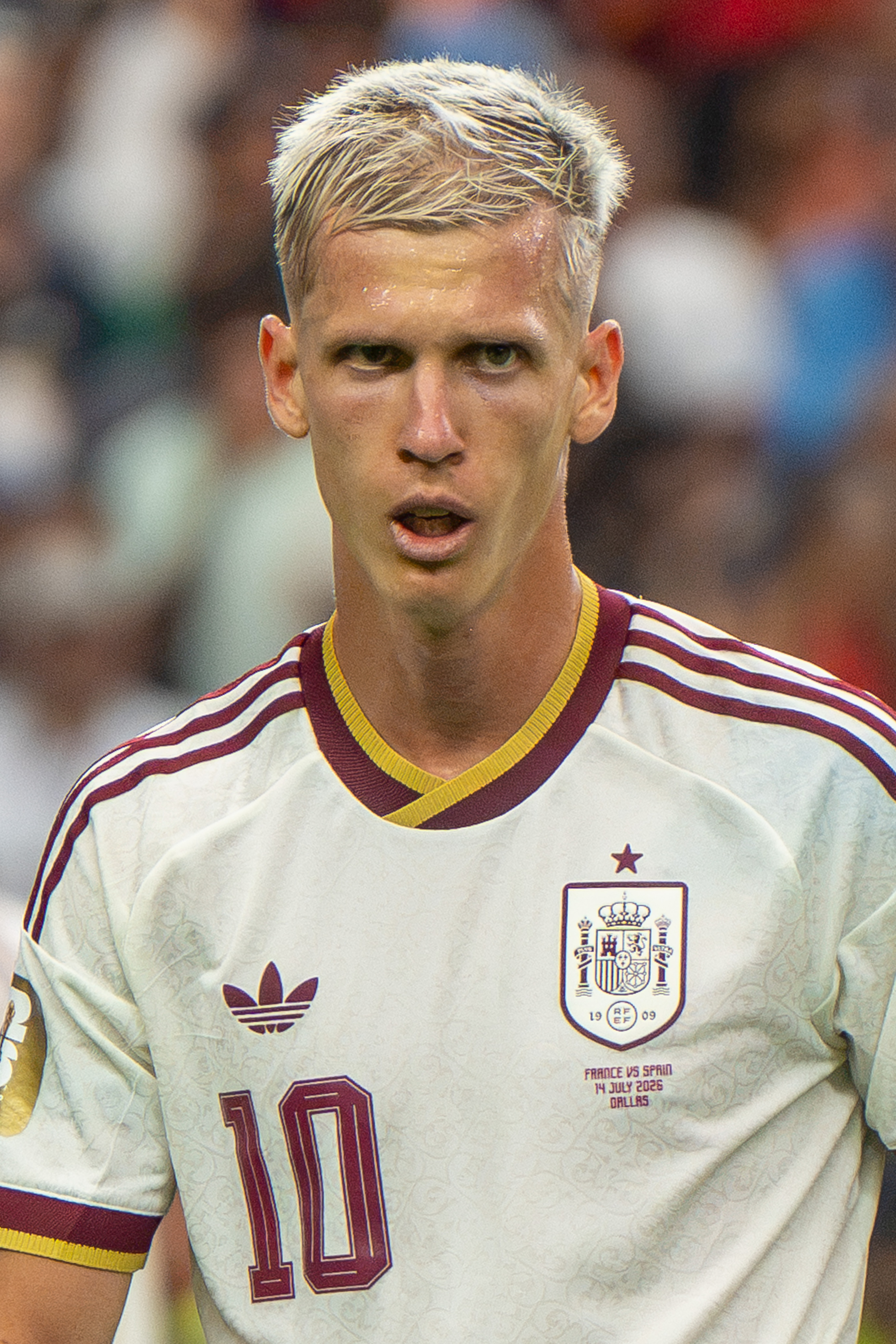
- Olmo with Spain in 2026

Personal information
- Full name: Daniel Olmo Carvajal
- Date of birth: 7 May 1998 (age 28)
- Place of birth: Terrassa, Spain
- Height: 1.82 m (6 ft 0 in)
- Positions: Attacking midfielder; winger

Team information
- Current team: Barcelona
- Number: 20

Youth career
- 2006–2007: Espanyol
- 2007–2014: Barcelona
- 2014–2016: Dinamo Zagreb

Senior career*
Years	Team	Apps	(Gls)
2015–2017	Dinamo Zagreb II	25	(3)
2015–2020	Dinamo Zagreb	80	(20)
2020–2024	RB Leipzig	107	(17)
2024–	Barcelona	68	(18)

International career^{‡}
7 years	Spain U16	3	(0)
2015	Spain U17	9	(1)
2016	Spain U18	3	(1)
2018–2019	Spain U21	14	(6)
2021	Spain U23	7	(1)
2019–	Spain	61	(12)
Medal record
Men's football
Representing Spain
FIFA World Cup
Winner	2026 Canada–Mexico–US
UEFA European Championship
Winner	2024 Germany
Bronze medal – third place	2020 Europe
UEFA Nations League
Winner	2023 Netherlands
Runner-up	2025 Germany
UEFA European Under-21 Championship
Winner	2019 Italy
Olympic Games
Silver medal – second place	2020 Tokyo	Team
- * Club domestic league appearances and goals as of 21:23, 22 November 2026 (UTC) ‡ National team caps and goals as of 18:10, 7 October 2026 (UTC)

Daniel Olmo Carvajal (Note: Spanish pronunciation: [dˈani ˈolmo]) (born 7 May 1998) is a Spanish professional footballer who plays as an attacking midfielder or left winger for La Liga club Barcelona and the Spain national team. He is known for his spatial awareness, quick scanning and tight-space dribbling.

After a period at La Masia, Olmo made his professional debut for Dinamo Zagreb in Croatia in 2015. He made 124 total appearances for the club, scoring 34 goals and winning the league five times and the cup three times. In 2020, he joined RB Leipzig, where he won two DFB-Pokals in 2022 and 2023 as well as the 2023 DFL-Supercup, where he scored a hat-trick, before rejoining boyhood club Barcelona in 2024.

Olmo won the 2019 UEFA European Championship with the Spain under-21 team, and a silver medal at the 2020 Olympic tournament. He made his senior international debut in 2019, and was part of the teams that reached the semi-finals of UEFA Euro 2020, and won the 2023 UEFA Nations League. He was a key member of the Spain teams that won Euro 2024 (finishing as the tournament's joint-top scorer) and the 2026 FIFA World Cup.

== Club career ==
=== Early career ===
Born in Terrassa, Barcelona, Catalonia, Olmo arrived in Barcelona's youth academy aged nine, from neighbours Espanyol.

=== Dinamo Zagreb ===
In a surprise move orchestrated by Andy Bara, Olmo joined Dinamo Zagreb on 31 July 2014, aged 16. He made his first team debut against Lokomotiva Zagreb on 7 February 2015, as a 76th-minute substitute for Paulo Machado in a 2–1 home win. On 22 September, he scored his first goal in a 7–1 win at Oštrc Zlatar in the first round of the cup.

On 22 August 2016, Olmo signed a new four-year contract. He scored three goals in four games as the team came runners-up in the cup, including one in the 3–1 loss to Rijeka in the final on 31 May; four days earlier he scored his first league goal in a 5–2 home win over the same team – already champions – on the final day.

Olmo provided Izet Hajrović with an assist for the third goal and scored the fourth in the Europa League 4–1 victory over Fenerbahçe on 20 September 2018. On 17 December, Olmo was named the best player of the Prva HNL for 2018. In the same month, he finished 11th in Tuttosport's Golden Boy award, ahead of the likes of Kylian Mbappé and Josip Brekalo.

On 14 February 2019, he scored the only goal in a Europa League round of 32 game against Viktoria Plzeň that ended in a 2–1 loss. On 3 June, he was named the best player and best young player of the 2018–19 Prva HNL season.

On 18 September 2019, he made his Champions League debut in a 4–0 home win over Atalanta. He scored his first goal in the competition on 22 October in a 2–2 away draw with Shakhtar Donetsk. He scored the only Dinamo's goal in a 1–4 home defeat to Manchester City on 11 December, as Dinamo finished at the bottom of the group.

=== RB Leipzig ===
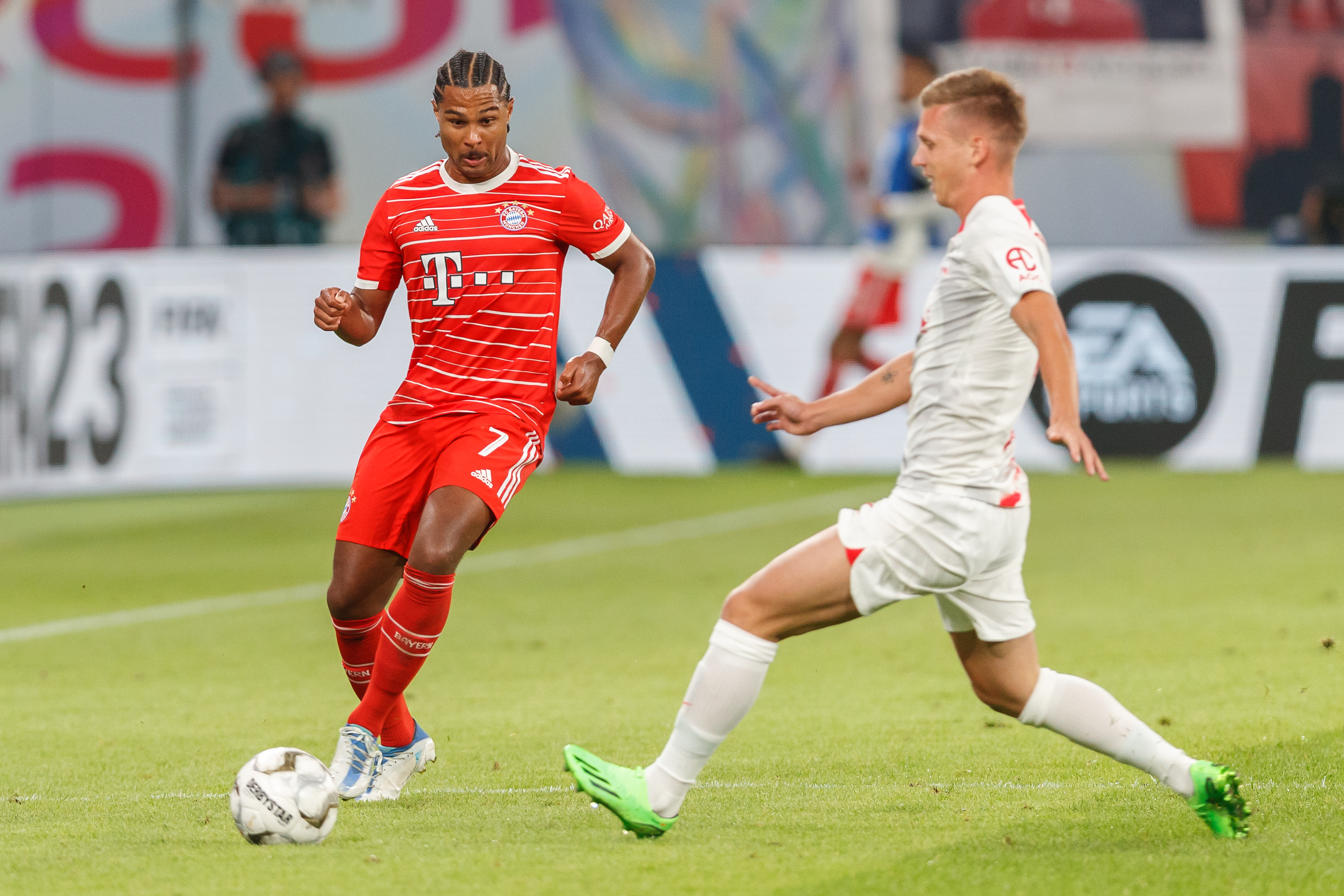
Olmo (right) and Bayern Munich's Serge Gnabry in the 2022 DFL-Supercup

On 25 January 2020, Olmo moved to Bundesliga club RB Leipzig, signing a four-year contract. He made his debut a week later, in a 2–2 draw with Borussia Mönchengladbach, coming on for Tyler Adams in 69th minute. On 4 February he scored the only goal in a 3–1 DFB-Pokal defeat to Eintracht Frankfurt, having come on for Amadou Haidara at half time.

Olmo made his first start for Leipzig on 9 February 2020, in a game against Bayern Munich that ended as a goalless draw, coming off for Patrik Schick in the 69th minute. On 12 June, he scored both goals in a 2–0 victory over 1899 Hoffenheim. On 13 August, he scored the opening goal in a 2–1 victory over Atlético Madrid at the Estádio José Alvalade, as Leipzig progressed to the Champions League semi-final for the first time in the history of the club.

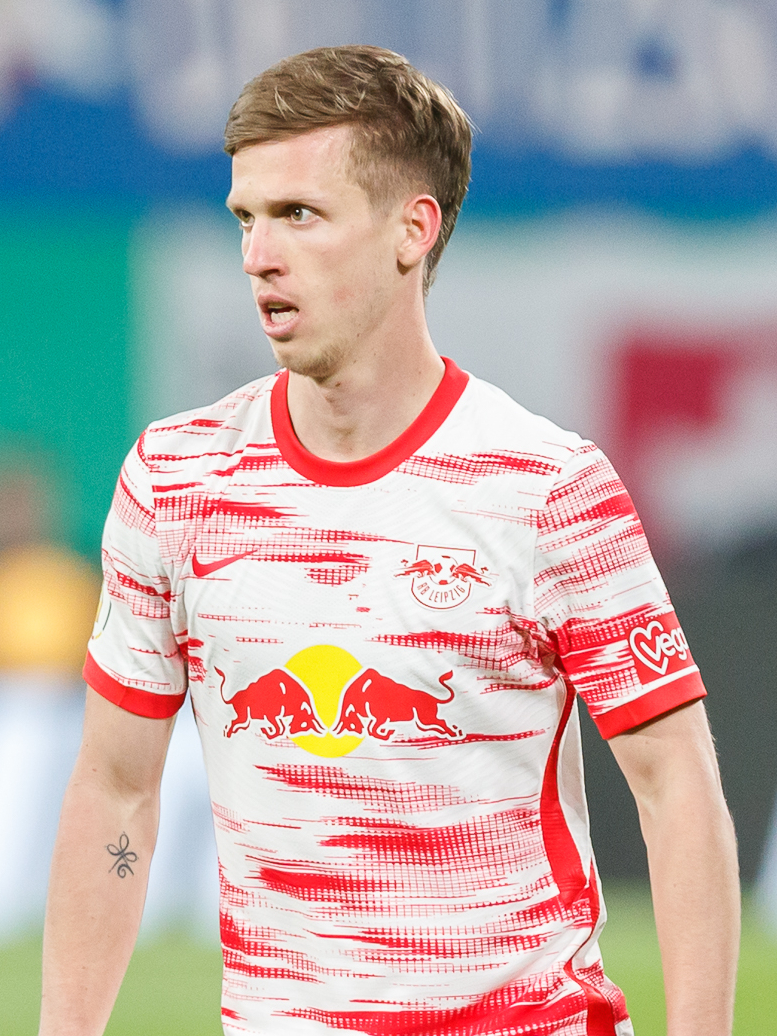
Olmo in 2022

Olmo played four games in RB Leipzig's victory in the DFB-Pokal in 2021–22, scoring to conclude a 2–0 home win over Hansa Rostock in the last 16 on 19 January. He was a 69th-minute substitute for Kevin Kampl in the final on 21 May, and scored in the penalty shoot-out win after a 1–1 draw with SC Freiburg; with two minutes of extra time remaining, he was tackled in the penalty area by Nicolas Höfler and Kampl was sent off from the substitutes' bench for demanding a penalty kick. On 30 July, again on for Kampl, he scored a consolation goal in a 5–3 loss to Bayern Munich in the 2022 DFL-Supercup.

On 12 August 2023, Olmo scored a hat-trick in the DFL-Supercup against Bayern Munich, providing the only goals scored in the match.

=== Return to Barcelona ===
==== 2024–25 season ====
On 9 August 2024, Olmo returned to his youth career club Barcelona, signing a six-year contract in a deal reportedly worth in the region of €60 million.

On 27 August 2024, after missing the games against Valencia and Athletic Bilbao as he was unable to be registered due to salary-cap issues, Olmo made his debut. He came off the bench to replace Ferran Torres against Rayo Vallecano in the second half and scored the winning goal in the 82nd minute, giving his club a 1–2 away win. On 3 November, after returning from injury, Olmo scored his fourth and fifth goals in five games for Barcelona in a 3–1 win against Espanyol. On 26 November, he scored his first UEFA Champions League goal for Barcelona in a 3–0 victory over Brest. Due to Barcelona’s failure to register him and teammate Pau Víctor in time for 2025, Olmo had the option of becoming a free agent and could negotiate with any club. Subsequently, Consejo Superior de Deportes approved the registration of Olmo and Pau Víctor on 8 January 2025, meaning that both players could play for the club in La Liga, UEFA Champions League, Copa del Rey, and the eventual Supercopa de España final against Real Madrid.

==== 2025–26 season ====
Olmo scored his first goal of the season on 21 September 2025 in a 3–0 victory over Getafe in La Liga, in which he also assisted the first goal to Ferran Torres.

On 2 December 2025, right after scoring in a La Liga match against Atlético Madrid, Olmo landed awkwardly on the ground and was subsequently substituted. It was later confirmed that he had dislocated his shoulder and would be out for a duration of approximately one month.

== International career ==
=== Youth teams ===
Olmo was part of the Spanish squad at the 2015 European Under-17 Championship in Bulgaria; he netted in the penalty shoot-out as they were eliminated by Germany in the quarter-finals, but then had his attempt saved by Will Huffer as Spain lost to England by the same means in a play-off for that year's World Cup for the category. Towards the end of 2017, Dinamo Zagreb director Tomislav Svetina said that the club was doing all it could to get the teenager Croatian citizenship as Olmo himself showed a desire to switch to Croatia at the international level. However, in October 2018, he made his debut for the Spain U21 side.

Olmo was part of Spain's squad that won the 2019 UEFA European Under-21 Championship in Italy and San Marino, playing four matches, assisting one goal and scoring three, including one in the final which caused him to be named Man of the Match.

=== Senior team ===
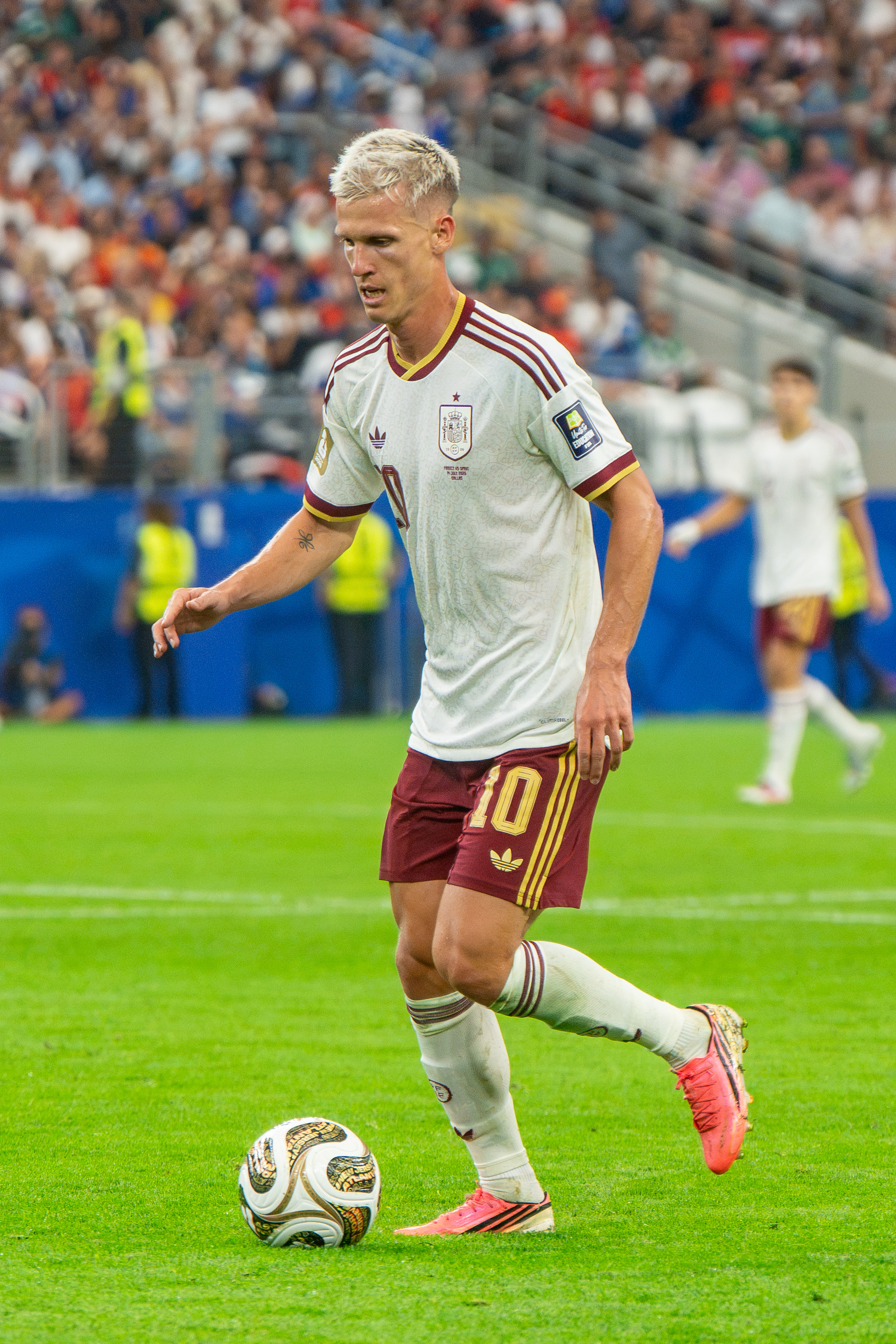
Olmo playing for Spain against France in the 2026 FIFA World Cup semi-finals

Olmo earned his first senior team call-up in November 2019, for Euro 2020 qualifiers against Malta and Romania, after Spain had already qualified for the tournament. He debuted on 15 November as a substitute for Álvaro Morata in the 66th minute and scored three minutes later in the 7–0 home victory over Malta. Fellow debutant Pau Torres also scored, making it the first time that two Spaniards scored on their first cap in 30 years.

On 24 May 2021, Olmo was included in Luis Enrique's 24-man squad for the UEFA Euro 2020. On 28 June, in the extra time of the round of 16 fixture against Croatia, he provided Morata and Mikel Oyarzabal with assists to set the score at 4–3 and 5–3 respectively. On 2 July, after the quarter-final 1–1 draw with Switzerland went to a penalty shoot-out, Olmo successfully converted his as Spain won 3–1. On 6 July, in the semi-final fixture against Italy, he provided Morata with an assist for an equalizer; however, another 1–1 draw went to another shoot-out with Olmo missing his penalty and Italy winning 4–2.

Olmo was included in Luis de la Fuente's 22-man squad for the 2020 Summer Olympics, on 29 June 2021. On Spain's road to Olympic silver, Olmo contributed an assist in the 1–1 draw with Argentina, and a goal and an assist in the 5–2 victory over Ivory Coast. He was named a starter in the final that Spain lost 2–1 to Brazil.

On 11 November 2022, Olmo was named in Luis Enrique's 26-man squad for the 2022 FIFA World Cup. In their opening group stage match against Costa Rica, Olmo scored the first goal and assisted the seventh as they won 7–0, becoming Spain's biggest win at a World Cup. He also played in the 1–1 draw against Germany, and the 2–1 defeat to Japan. He also started in Spain's round of 16 match against Morocco, which Spain went on to lose 3–0 on penalties following a 0–0 draw after extra time.

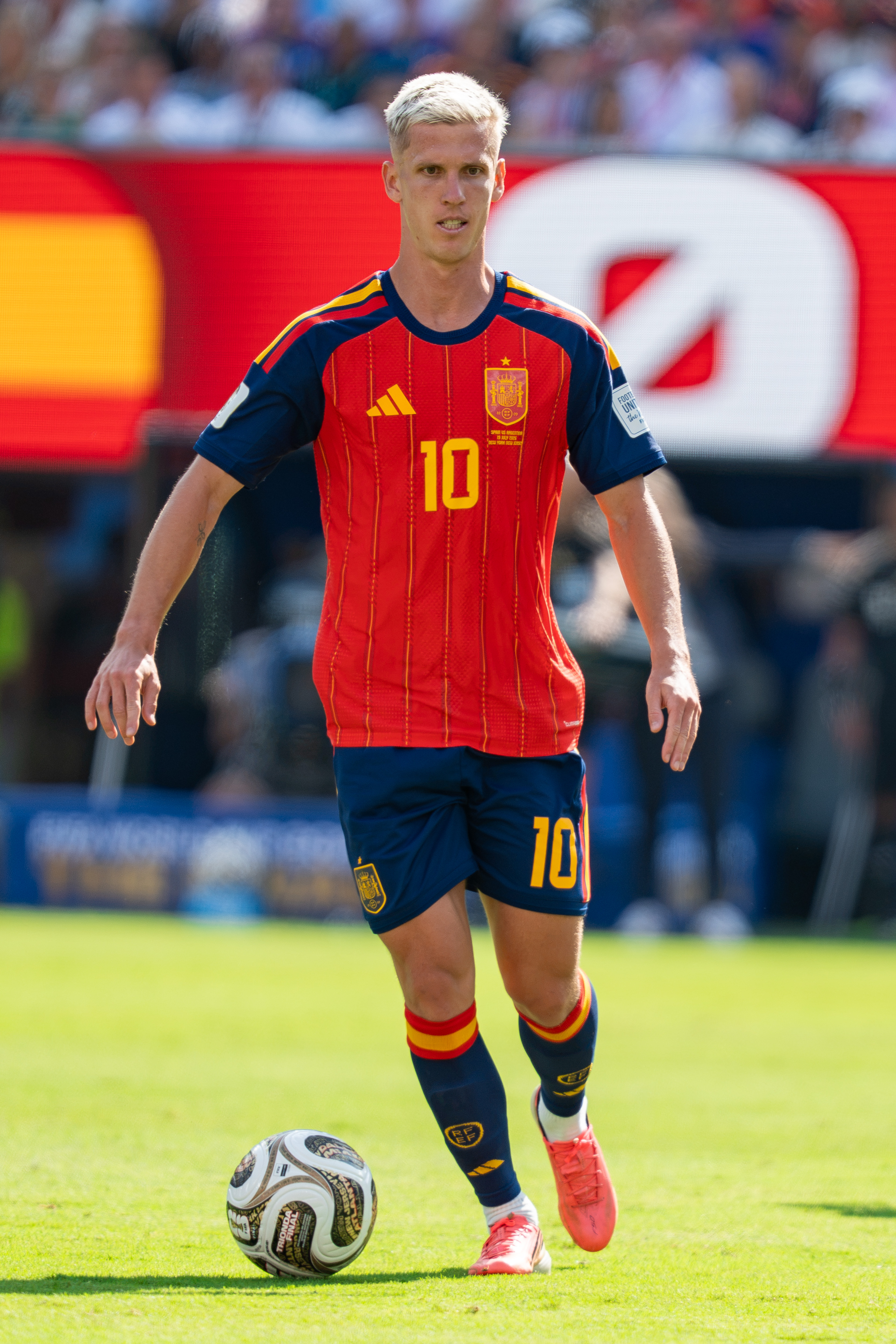
Olmo with Spain against Argentina at the 2026 World Cup final

On 7 June 2024, Olmo was selected in the 26-man squad for the UEFA Euro 2024. He scored his first goal in the European competition in a 4–1 victory over Georgia in the round of 16. In the quarter-final match against hosts Germany, he was awarded player of the match, scoring a goal and providing an assist in a 2–1 victory after extra time, after replacing the injured Pedri early in the first half. Olmo scored his third goal of the tournament in a 2–1 victory over France in the semi-final. In the final against England, he played a crucial role in the 2–1 victory with a goal-line clearance in the 90th minute. With three goals in the tournament, he was awarded the Golden Boot in a 6-way tie.

On 25 May 2026, Olmo was selected in the 26-man squad for the 2026 FIFA World Cup. He provided an assist in a 2–0 victory over France in the semi-final, recording his eighth assist in a major tournament and equaling the record set by Spanish midfielder Cesc Fàbregas. On 19 July, Olmo started in final as Spain beat defending champions Argentina 1–0 after extra time.

== Personal life ==
Olmo's father, Miquel Olmo, is a former footballer. As a forward, he played professionally for lower-league teams. Dani's older brother Carlos is also a footballer and plays as a defender; he spent several years in Croatia for Dinamo's reserves and Lokomotiva Zagreb. Olmo speaks Spanish, Catalan, English, German, and Croatian fluently.

== Career statistics ==
=== Club ===
As of match played 22 November 2026

Appearances and goals by club, season and competition
Club	Season	League			National cup (Note: Includes Croatian Cup, DFB-Pokal, Copa del Rey)		Europe		Other		Total	
Club	Season	Division	Apps	Goals	Apps	Goals	Apps	Goals	Apps	Goals	Apps	Goals
Dinamo Zagreb	2014–15	Prva HNL	5	0	—		—		—		5	0
Dinamo Zagreb	2015–16	Prva HNL	1	0	1	1	—		—		2	1
Dinamo Zagreb	2016–17	Prva HNL	14	1	4	3	—		—		18	4
Dinamo Zagreb	2017–18	Prva HNL	26	8	5	1	2 (Note: Appearances in UEFA Europa League)	0	—		33	9
Dinamo Zagreb	2018–19	Prva HNL	25	8	3	1	16 (Note: Six appearances and one goal in UEFA Champions League, ten appearances and two goals in UEFA Europa League)	3	—		44	12
Dinamo Zagreb	2019–20	Prva HNL	9	3	2	0	11 (Note: Appearances in UEFA Champions League)	5	—		22	8
Dinamo Zagreb	Total		80	20	15	6	29	8	—		124	34
Dinamo Zagreb II	2015–16	Druga HNL	15	1	—		—		—		15	1
Dinamo Zagreb II	2016–17	Druga HNL	10	2	—		—		—		10	2
Dinamo Zagreb II	Total		25	3	—		—		—		25	3
RB Leipzig	2019–20	Bundesliga	12	3	1	1	2	1	—		15	5
RB Leipzig	2020–21	Bundesliga	32	5	6	1	8	1	—		46	7
RB Leipzig	2021–22	Bundesliga	19	3	4	1	8 (Note: Two appearances in UEFA Champions League, six appearances in UEFA Europa League)	0	—		31	4
RB Leipzig	2022–23	Bundesliga	23	2	4	2	3	0	1 (Note: Appearance in DFL-Supercup)	1	31	5
RB Leipzig	2023–24	Bundesliga	21	4	0	0	3	1	1	3	25	8
RB Leipzig	Total		107	17	15	5	24	3	2	4	148	29
Barcelona	2024–25	La Liga	25	10	4	0	9	2	1 (Note: Appearance(s) in Supercopa de España)	0	39	12
Barcelona	2025–26	La Liga	33	7	4	0	10	1	2	0	49	8
Barcelona	2026–27	La Liga	10	1	0	0	3	0	0	0	13	1
Barcelona	Total		68	18	8	0	22	3	3	0	101	21
Career total			278	55	38	11	75	14	5	4	397	86

=== International ===
As of match played 6 October 2026

Appearances and goals by national team and year
National team	Year	Apps	Goals
Spain	2019	1	1
Spain	2020	7	0
Spain	2021	10	2
Spain	2022	11	2
Spain	2023	3	2
Spain	2024	9	4
Spain	2025	5	1
Spain	2026	16	0
Total		61	12

As of match played 19 July 2026
Scores and results list Spain's goal tally first.

List of international goals scored by Dani Olmo
No.	Date	Venue	Cap	Opponent	Score	Result	Competition
1	15 November 2019	Ramón de Carranza, Cádiz, Spain	1	Malta	5–0	7–0	UEFA Euro 2020 qualifying
2	28 March 2021	Boris Paichadze Dinamo Arena, Tbilisi, Georgia	10	Georgia	2–1	2–1	2022 FIFA World Cup qualification
3	31 March 2021	La Cartuja, Seville, Spain	11	Kosovo	1–0	3–1	2022 FIFA World Cup qualification
4	26 March 2022	RCDE Stadium, Cornellà de Llobregat, Spain	19	Albania	2–1	2–1	Friendly
5	23 November 2022	Al Thumama Stadium, Doha, Qatar	26	Costa Rica	1–0	7–0	2022 FIFA World Cup
6	25 March 2023	La Rosaleda, Málaga, Spain	30	Norway	1–0	3–0	UEFA Euro 2024 qualifying
7	8 September 2023	Boris Paichadze Dinamo Arena, Tbilisi, Georgia	32	Georgia	3–0	7–1	UEFA Euro 2024 qualifying
8	26 March 2024	Santiago Bernabéu, Madrid, Spain	33	Brazil	2–0	3–3	Friendly
9	30 June 2024	RheinEnergieStadion, Cologne, Germany	36	Georgia	4–1	4–1	UEFA Euro 2024
10	5 July 2024	MHPArena, Stuttgart, Germany	37	Germany	1–0	2–1 (a.e.t.)	UEFA Euro 2024
11	9 July 2024	Allianz Arena, Munich, Germany	38	France	2–1	2–1	UEFA Euro 2024
12	18 November 2025	La Cartuja, Seville, Spain	46	Turkey	1–0	2–2	2026 FIFA World Cup qualification

== Honours ==
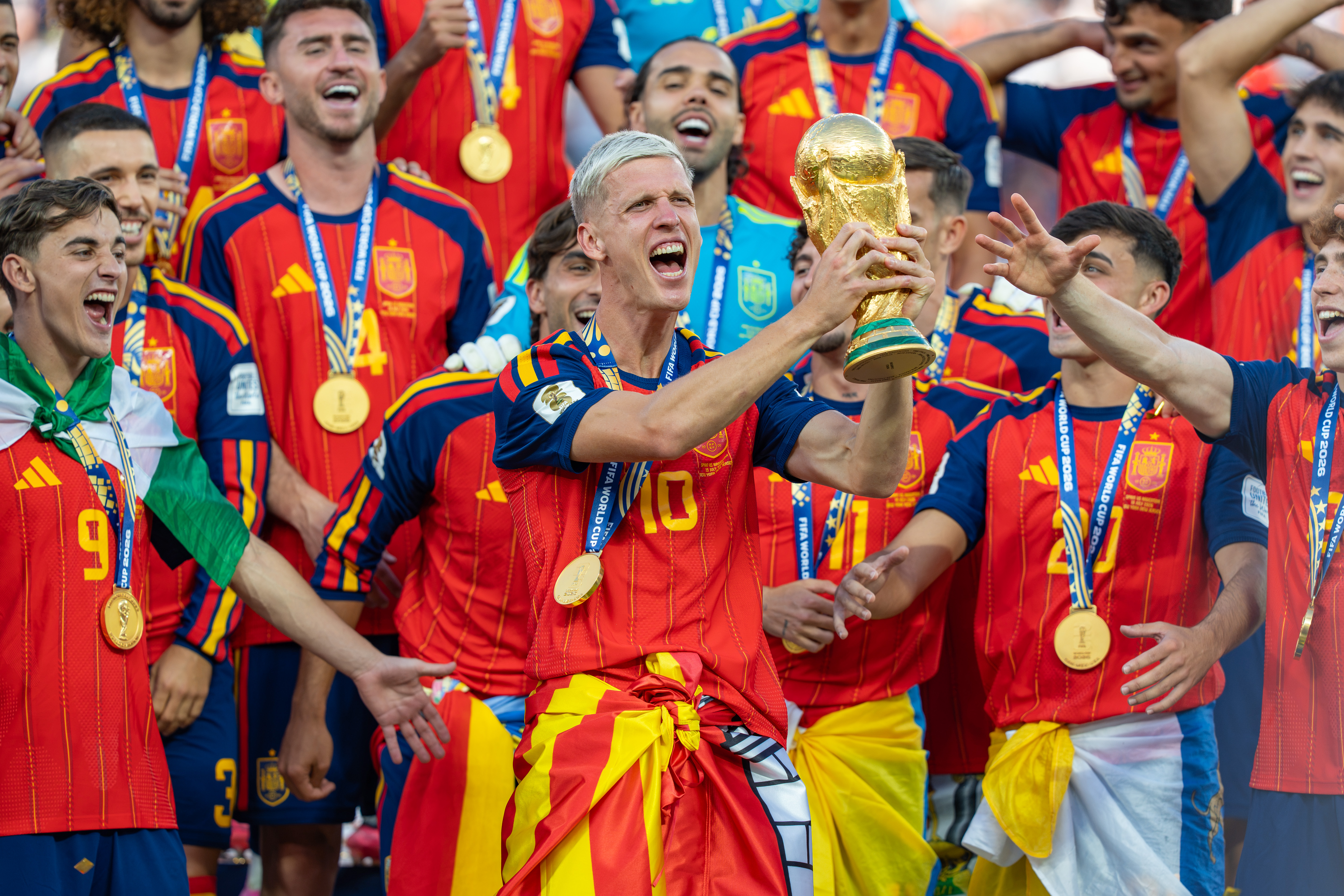
Olmo holding the FIFA World Cup Trophy after Spain won the final

Dinamo Zagreb

- Prva HNL: 2014–15, 2015–16, 2017–18, 2018–19, 2019–20
- Croatian Cup: 2014–15, 2015–16, 2017–18
- Croatian Super Cup: 2019

RB Leipzig

- DFB-Pokal: 2021–22, 2022–23
- DFL-Supercup: 2023

Barcelona

- La Liga: 2024–25, 2025–26
- Copa del Rey: 2024–25
- Supercopa de España: 2025, 2026

Spain U21

- UEFA European Under-21 Championship: 2019

Spain U23

- Summer Olympics silver medal: 2020

Spain

- FIFA World Cup: 2026
- UEFA European Championship: 2024
- UEFA Nations League: 2022–23; runner-up: 2024–25

Individual

- UEFA European Under-21 Championship Team of the Tournament: 2019
- UEFA Champions League Breakthrough XI: 2019
- Prva HNL Player of the Year: 2018
- Trophy Footballer – Best Prva HNL player: 2019
- Trophy Footballer – Best Prva HNL U-21 player: 2019
- Trophy Footballer – Prva HNL Team of the Year: 2019
- GNK Dinamo Zagreb Player of the Year: 2019
- SIMPOSAR International Sports Symposium – Discovery of the Year: 2019
- UEFA European Championship top scorer: 2024 (shared)
- UEFA European Championship Team of the Tournament: 2024
