= Fabián Ruiz =

Spanish footballer (born 1996)

- Fabián with Spain in 2026

Personal information
- Full name: Fabián Ruiz Peña
- Date of birth: 3 April 1996 (age 30)
- Place of birth: Los Palacios y Villafranca, Spain
- Height: 1.89 m (6 ft 2 in)
- Position: Central midfielder

Team information
- Current team: Paris Saint-Germain
- Number: 8

Youth career
- La Unión Los Palacios
- 2004–2014: Betis

Senior career*
Years	Team	Apps	(Gls)
2014–2016	Betis B	23	(2)
2014–2018	Betis	56	(3)
2017	→ Elche (loan)	18	(1)
2018–2022	Napoli	125	(18)
2022–	Paris Saint-Germain	107	(9)

International career^{‡}
2015	Spain U19	2	(0)
2017–2019	Spain U21	14	(5)
2019–	Spain	54	(7)
Medal record
Men's football
Representing Spain
FIFA World Cup
Winner	2026 Canada–Mexico–US
UEFA European Championship
Winner	2024 Germany
Bronze medal – third place	2020 Europe
UEFA Nations League
Winner	2023 Netherlands
Runner-up	2025 Germany
UEFA European Under-21 Championship
Winner	2019 Italy
- * Club domestic league appearances and goals as of 22:00, 21 November 2026 (UTC) ‡ National team caps and goals as of 22:05, 15 November 2026 (UTC)

Fabián Ruiz Peña (Spanish pronunciation: [faˈβjan rwiθ ˈpeɲa]; born 3 April 1996), also known mononymously as Fabián, is a Spanish professional footballer who plays as a central midfielder for Ligue 1 club Paris Saint-Germain and the Spain national team. Widely regarded as one of the best central midfielders in the world, he is known for his passing, vision, ball control and technical ability, while his versatility also allows him to operate in defensive and attacking midfield roles.

He began his senior career with Real Betis, having joined the club's youth academy at the age of eight. After spending part of the 2016–17 season on loan at Elche, he established himself as a regular in the Betis first team during the following campaign. In 2018, he joined Serie A club Napoli, and helped the club win the 2019–20 Coppa Italia, during his four seasons with the club.

In 2022, Ruiz signed for Paris Saint-Germain. Over the following seasons, he established himself as an important member of the team, winning multiple Ligue 1 titles and was integral to the club winning their first UEFA Champions League titles back-to-back in 2025 and 2026, with the former being part of a continental treble.

Ruiz is a Spain international and former youth international. He made his debut for the senior national team in 2019 and represented his country at two UEFA European Championships (in 2020 and 2024) and the 2026 FIFA World Cup. He won the UEFA Nations League in 2023, and was an integral part in Spain's victory at Euro 2024, for which he was named in the team of the tournament. He also helped Spain win the 2026 World Cup, as Spain claimed their second title.

== Club career ==
=== Real Betis ===
==== Early years ====
Born in Los Palacios y Villafranca, Seville, Andalusia, Spain. Fabián joined Real Betis' youth setup in 2004, aged eight, after starting it out at EF La Unión de Los Palacios.

Ruiz has credited his mother with bringing him into football. He was promoted to the reserves in July 2014, and made his senior debut on 21 September, coming on as a second half substitute in a 4–1 home loss against Marbella in the Segunda División B championship.

Fabián played his first match as a professional on 16 December, replacing Xavi Torres in the 51st minute of a 1–0 Segunda División away win against Lugo.

Fabián made his debut in the main category of Spanish football on 23 August 2015, coming on as a substitute for Alfred N'Diaye in a 1–1 home draw against Villarreal.

==== Loan to Elche ====
On 23 December of the following year he renewed his contract until 2019, and was immediately loaned to Elche in the second level.

==== Breakthrough ====
Upon returning, Fabián became a regular starter under new manager Quique Setién, scoring his first goal in the top tier on 25 September 2017 in a 4–0 home routing of Levante. The following 31 January, he renewed his contract until 2023, setting his buyout clause at €30 million.

On 30 April 2018, Fabián scored the winning goal for Betis as they secured UEFA Europa League qualification for the 2018–19 season following a 2–1 home win over Málaga.

=== Napoli ===
On 5 July 2018, Fabián joined Napoli on a five-year contract until 2023 with Napoli reportedly paying Fabián's €30 million buyout clause. He made his debut on 16 September in a Champions League group game away to Red Star Belgrade, playing the full 90 minutes of a goalless draw. Ten days later he played his first Serie A match and first at the Stadio San Paolo, a 3–0 win over Parma.

=== Paris Saint-Germain ===
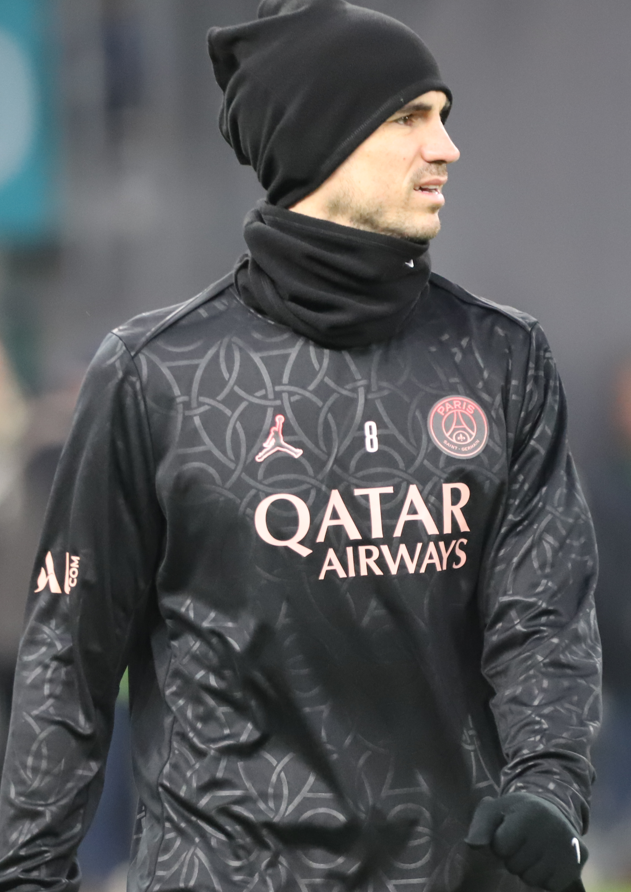
Fabián training with Paris Saint-Germain in 2025

On 30 August 2022, Fabián signed for Ligue 1 club Paris Saint-Germain (PSG) on a five-year contract. He made his debut as a substitute in a 1–0 victory over Brest at the Parc des Princes on 10 September 2022. On 1 February 2023, he scored his first PSG goal in a 3–1 win over Montpellier. At the end of the season, Fabián won the Ligue 1 title with PSG, his first top-flight league title.

On 7 May 2025, Fabián scored his first UEFA Champions League goal with a volley from outside the box in the Champions League semi-final second leg against Arsenal, helping Paris Saint-Germain reach the Champions League final to play against Inter Milan.

He was a key component in the PSG side that went on to win the Champions League as part of a continental treble, finishing 24th in the 2025 Ballon d'Or rankings. He also played a key role in his club's back-to-back Champions League triumph during the 2025–26 season.

== International career ==
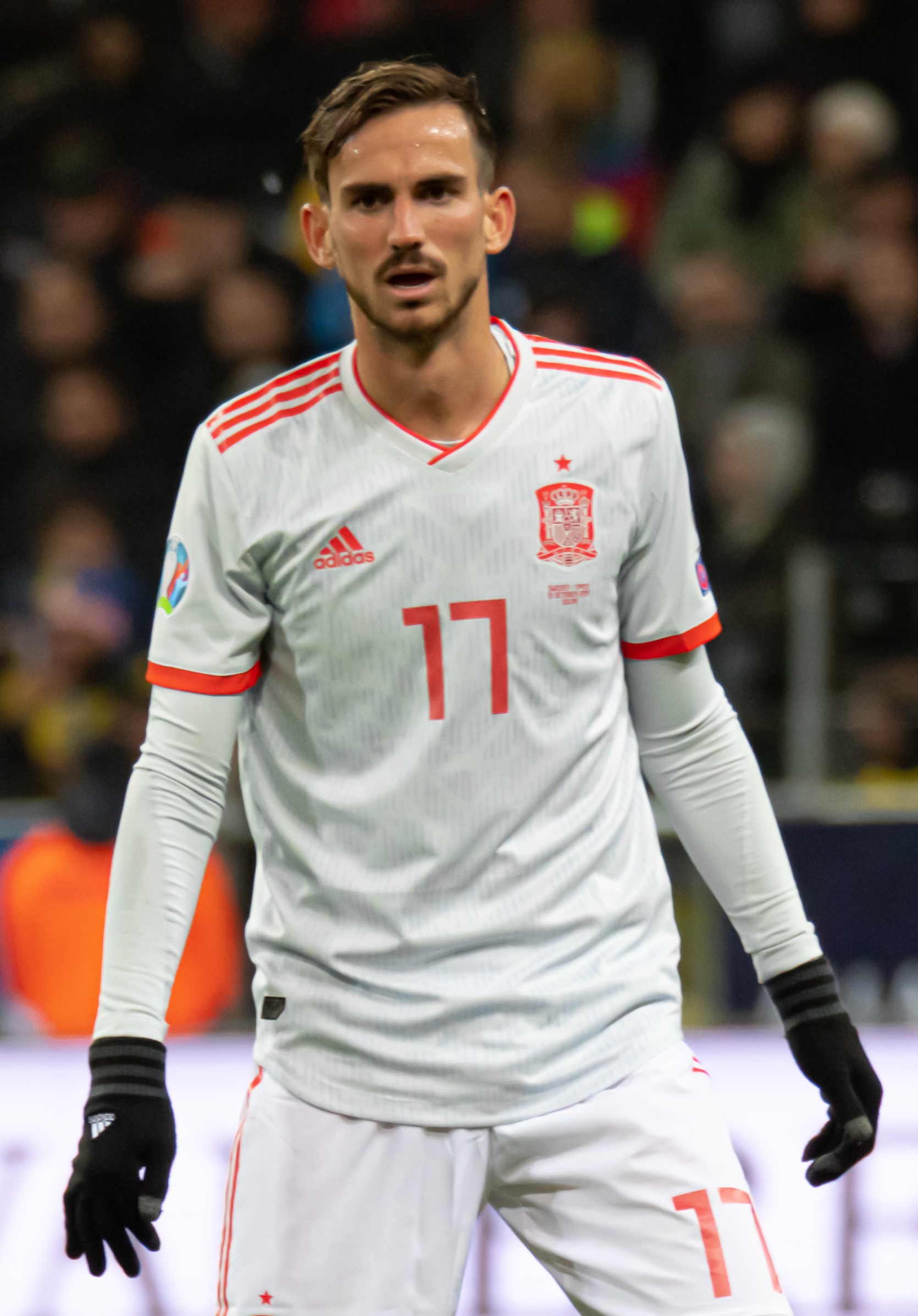
Fabián playing for Spain in 2019

After representing Spain at under-19 and under-21 levels, Fabián was called up to the Spain senior team by manager Luis Enrique on 15 March 2019, for two UEFA Euro 2020 qualifying matches against Norway and Malta. He debuted on 7 June 2019 in a UEFA Euro 2020 qualifier against the Faroe Islands, coming on as a substitute for Isco in the 74th minute. Four days later, he made his full debut, starting alongside Sergio Busquets and Dani Parejo in midfield against Sweden, assisting Mikel Oyarzabal's goal in the 87th minute of the 3–0 win.

In July 2019, Fabián returned to the Spain U21 squad for the 2019 UEFA European Under-21 Championship. In the team's opening match, he assisted Dani Ceballos's opening goal for La Rojita in a 3–1 loss to host nation Italy. After being an unused substitute in the second match against Belgium, he scored the third goal of the 5–0 win over Poland in the final Group A fixture. During the knockout stage, he assisted Dani Olmo's goal in the semi-final against France and scored the opening goal of the 2–1 win against Germany in the final, as well as recording his third assist when Dani Olmo scored the winning goal following up his long-range shot. He was named Player of the Tournament by UEFA for his performances in Spain's midfield as they won their fifth European U21 title.

Fabián scored his first goal for the Spain senior team in their final Euro 2024 qualifier against Romania on 18 November 2019. On 24 May 2021, Fabián was included in Luis Enrique's 24-man squad for UEFA Euro 2020. He made three substitute appearances at the tournament, against Sweden and Poland in the group stage and Croatia in the round of 16. In June 2023, Fabián was part of the Spain squad for the 2023 UEFA Nations League Finals and played 16 minutes as a substitute for Mikel Merino in the semi-final against Italy. On 18 June, he started in the final against Croatia, playing 78 minutes before being substituted for Merino as Spain won 5–4 in the penalty shootout to win their first UEFA Nations League title.

In June 2024, Fabián was named in Spain's squad for UEFA Euro 2024 in Germany. In the team's opening match of the tournament, he scored Spain's second goal as they beat Croatia 3–0 at Berlin's Olympiastadion. Fabián played as a starter during the rest of the tournament helping Spain win their fourth European championship.

On 25 May 2026, Fabián was selected in Spain's squad for the 2026 FIFA World Cup. He started 3 crucial games benching Pedri in the World Cup. He scored his first World Cup goal, opening the scoring in a 2–1 victory over Belgium in the quarter-finals. He earned his 50th cap for Spain in the 1–0 extra-time victory over Argentina in the World Cup final, remaining unbeaten in all his appearances for the national team.

== Style of play ==
A left-footed central midfielder, Fabián is known for his vision, passing, ball control and dribbling skills, as well as his tactical versatility, and can play in a number of formations, such as 4–4–2, 4–3–3, and 4–2–3–1. He can also play as a defensive midfielder or an attacking midfielder.

== Career statistics ==
=== Club ===
As of match played 21 November 2026

Appearances and goals by club, season and competition
Club	Season	League			National cup (Note: Includes Copa del Rey, Coppa Italia, Coupe de France)		Europe		Other		Total	
Club	Season	Division	Apps	Goals	Apps	Goals	Apps	Goals	Apps	Goals	Apps	Goals
Real Betis B	2014–15	Segunda División B	19	1	—		—		—		19	1
Real Betis B	2015–16	Segunda División B	4	2	—		—		—		4	2
Real Betis B	Total		23	3	—		—		—		23	3
Real Betis	2014–15	Segunda División	6	0	0	0	—		—		6	0
Real Betis	2015–16	La Liga	12	0	2	0	—		—		14	0
Real Betis	2016–17	La Liga	4	0	1	0	—		—		5	0
Real Betis	2017–18	La Liga	34	3	1	0	—		—		35	3
Real Betis	Total		56	3	4	0	—		—		60	3
Elche (loan)	2016–17	Segunda División	18	1	—		—		—		18	1
Napoli	2018–19	Serie A	27	5	2	1	11 (Note: Six appearances in UEFA Champions League, five appearances and one goal in UEFA Europa League)	1	—		40	7
Napoli	2019–20	Serie A	33	3	5	1	8 (Note: Appearances in UEFA Champions League)	0	—		46	4
Napoli	2020–21	Serie A	33	3	1	0	8 (Note: Appearances in UEFA Europa League)	1	0	0	42	4
Napoli	2021–22	Serie A	32	7	1	0	5	0	—		38	7
Napoli	Total		125	18	9	2	32	2	0	0	166	22
Paris Saint-Germain	2022–23	Ligue 1	27	3	3	0	7	0	—		37	3
Paris Saint-Germain	2023–24	Ligue 1	21	1	5	2	9	0	0	0	35	3
Paris Saint-Germain	2024–25	Ligue 1	30	4	6	0	17	1	8 (Note: One appearance in Trophée des Champions, seven appearances and three goals in FIFA Club World Cup)	3	61	8
Paris Saint-Germain	2025–26	Ligue 1	20	1	2	0	9	1	3 (Note: One appearance in UEFA Super Cup, one appearance in FIFA Intercontinental Cup, one appearance in Trophée des Champions)	0	34	2
Paris Saint-Germain	2026–27	Ligue 1	9	0	0	0	4	4	2 (Note: One appearance in UEFA Super Cup, one appearance in Trophée des Champions)	0	15	4
Paris Saint-Germain	Total		107	9	16	2	46	6	13	3	182	20
Career total			329	34	29	4	78	8	13	3	449	49

=== International ===
As of match played 15 November 2026

Appearances and goals by national team and year
National team	Year	Apps	Goals
Spain	2019	6	1
Spain	2020	3	0
Spain	2021	6	0
Spain	2022	0	0
Spain	2023	6	0
Spain	2024	14	5
Spain	2025	6	0
Spain	2026	13	1
Total		54	7

As of match played 10 July 2026. Scores and results list Spain's goal tally first.

International goals by date, venue, cap, opponent, score, result and competition
No.	Date	Venue	Cap	Opponent	Score	Result	Competition
1	18 November 2019	Metropolitano Stadium, Madrid, Spain	6	Romania	1–0	5–0	UEFA Euro 2020 qualifying
2	8 June 2024	Estadi Mallorca Son Moix, Palma, Spain	23	Northern Ireland	4–1	5–1	Friendly
3	15 June 2024	Olympiastadion, Berlin, Germany	24	Croatia	2–0	3–0	UEFA Euro 2024
4	30 June 2024	RheinEnergieStadion, Cologne, Germany	26	Georgia	2–1	4–1	UEFA Euro 2024
5	8 September 2024	Stade de Genève, Geneva, Switzerland	31	Switzerland	2–0	4–1	2024–25 UEFA Nations League A
6	8 September 2024	Stade de Genève, Geneva, Switzerland	31	Switzerland	3–1	4–1	2024–25 UEFA Nations League A
7	10 July 2026	SoFi Stadium, Inglewood, United States	48	Belgium	1–0	2–1	2026 FIFA World Cup

== Honours ==
Real Betis

- Segunda División: 2014–15

Napoli

- Coppa Italia: 2019–20

Paris Saint-Germain

- Ligue 1: 2022–23, 2023–24, 2024–25, 2025–26
- Coupe de France: 2023–24, 2024–25
- Trophée des Champions: 2023, 2024, 2025
- UEFA Champions League: 2024–25, 2025–26
- UEFA Super Cup: 2025, 2026
- FIFA Intercontinental Cup: 2025
- FIFA Club World Cup runner-up: 2025

Spain U21

- UEFA European Under-21 Championship: 2019

Spain

- FIFA World Cup: 2026
- UEFA European Championship: 2024
- UEFA Nations League: 2022–23; runner-up: 2024–25

Individual

- UEFA European Championship Team of the Tournament: 2024
- UEFA European Under-21 Championship Golden Player: 2019
- UEFA European Under-21 Championship Team of the Tournament: 2019
