= 2019 UEFA European Under-21 Championship =

22nd UEFA European U-21 Championship

Campionato europeo di calcio Under-21 2019

Tournament details
- Host countries: Italy; San Marino
- Dates: 16–30 June
- Teams: 12 (from 1 confederation)
- Venues: 6 (in 6 host cities)

Final positions
- Champions: Spain (5th title)
- Runners-up: Germany

Tournament statistics
- Matches played: 21
- Goals scored: 78 (3.71 per match)
- Attendance: 214,637 (10,221 per match)
- Top scorer: (Germany) Luca Waldschmidt (7 goals)
- Best player: (Spain) Fabián Ruiz

The 2019 UEFA European Under-21 Championship (also known as UEFA Under-21 Euro 2019) was the 22nd edition of the UEFA European Under-21 Championship (25th edition if the Under-23 era is also included), the biennial international youth football championship organised by UEFA for the men's under-21 national teams of Europe. The final tournament was hosted by Italy (and some matches by San Marino) in mid-2019, after their bid was selected by the UEFA Executive Committee on 9 December 2016 in Nyon, Switzerland.

A total of twelve teams played in the tournament, with players born on or after 1 January 1996 eligible to participate.

Same as previous Under-21 Championships that were held one year prior to the Olympics, this tournament served as European qualifying for the Olympic football tournament, with the top four teams of the tournament qualifying for the 2020 Summer Olympic men's football tournament in Japan, where they will be represented by their under-23 national teams with maximum of three overage players allowed. The four teams that qualified for the Olympic Games were the ones that qualified for the knockout stage of this championship. For the first time, the video assistant referee (VAR) system was used at the UEFA European Under-21 Championship.

Germany were the defending champions.

== Hosts ==
In 2015 the Italian Football Federation confirmed that Italy would bid to host the tournament in 2019, which also involved the San Marino Football Federation. Italy and San Marino were appointed as hosts at a meeting of the UEFA Executive Committee in Nyon on 9 December 2016.

== Qualification ==
All 55 UEFA nations entered the competition, and with the hosts Italy qualifying automatically (the other co-hosts San Marino would not qualify automatically), the other 54 teams competed in the qualifying competition to determine the remaining eleven spots in the final tournament. The qualifying competition, which took place from March 2017 to November 2018, consisted of two rounds:

- Qualifying group stage: The 54 teams were drawn into nine groups of six teams. Each group was played in home-and-away round-robin format. The nine group winners qualified directly for the final tournament, while the four best runners-up (not counting results against the sixth-placed team) advanced to the play-offs.
- Play-offs: The four teams were drawn into two ties to play home-and-away two-legged matches to determine the last two qualified teams.

=== Qualified teams ===
The following teams qualified for the final tournament.

Note: All appearance statistics include only U-21 era (since 1978).

Team	Method of qualification	Date of qualification	Appearance	Last appearance	Previous best performance
Italy	Hosts	9 December 2016	20th	2017 (semi-finals)	Champions (1992, 1994, 1996, 2000, 2004)
Spain	Group 2 winners	6 September 2018	14th	2017 (runners-up)	Champions (1986, 1998, 2011, 2013)
France	Group 9 winners	7 September 2018	9th	2006 (semi-finals)	Champions (1988)
England	Group 4 winners	11 October 2018	15th	2017 (semi-finals)	Champions (1982, 1984)
Serbia	Group 7 winners	12 October 2018	11th	2017 (group stage)	Champions (1978) (as Yugoslavia)
Germany	Group 5 winners	12 October 2018	12th	2017 (champions)	Champions (2009, 2017)
Croatia	Group 1 winners	15 October 2018	3rd	2004 (group stage)	Group stage (2000, 2004)
Denmark	Group 3 winners	16 October 2018	8th	2017 (group stage)	Semi-finals (1992, 2015)
Belgium	Group 6 winners	16 October 2018	3rd	2007 (semi-finals)	Semi-finals (2007)
Romania	Group 8 winners	16 October 2018	2nd	1998 (quarter-finals)	Quarter-finals (1998)
Poland	Play-off winners	20 November 2018	7th	2017 (group stage)	Quarter-finals (1982, 1984, 1986, 1992, 1994)
Austria	Play-off winners	20 November 2018	1st	—	Debut

Notes

1. Appearances include 4 as Yugoslavia and 2 as Serbia and Montenegro. Their previous best performance as Serbia was runners-up (2007).

=== Final draw ===
The final draw was held on 23 November 2018, 18:00 CET (UTC+1), at the Lamborghini headquarters in Sant'Agata Bolognese, hosted by Mia Ceran and conducted by tournament ambassador Andrea Pirlo, who won the tournament in 2000.

The 12 teams were drawn into three groups of four teams. Italy, the host country, was assigned to position A1 in the draw, while the other teams were seeded according to their coefficient ranking following the end of the qualifying stage, calculated based on the following:

- 2015 UEFA European Under-21 Championship final tournament and qualifying competition (20%)
- 2017 UEFA European Under-21 Championship final tournament and qualifying competition (40%)
- 2019 UEFA European Under-21 Championship qualifying competition (group stage only) (40%)

Each group contained either the hosts or one team from Pot 1 (which were drawn to position B1 or C1), and one team from Pot 2 and two teams from Pot 3 (which were drawn to any of the positions 2–4 in the groups). The draw pots were as follows:

Hosts
Team
Italy

Pot 1
Team	Coeff
Germany	39,913
England	37,946

Pot 2
Team	Coeff
Spain	37,774
Denmark	35,533
France	35,182

Pot 3
Team	Coeff
Serbia	33,083
Croatia	32,952
Belgium	32,122
Austria	31,767
Poland	30,946
Romania	29,259

== Venues ==
On 9 December 2016, Italian Football Federation pre-selected venues (including one inside San Marino territory):

- Stadio Renato Dall'Ara in Bologna, Italy
- Mapei Stadium – Città del Tricolore in Reggio Emilia, Italy
- Stadio Dino Manuzzi in Cesena, Italy
- Stadio Nereo Rocco in Trieste, Italy
- Dacia Arena in Udine, Italy
- San Marino Stadium in Serravalle, San Marino

Italy
Bologna	Reggio nell'Emilia	Cesena
Stadio Renato Dall'Ara	Mapei Stadium – Città del Tricolore	Stadio Dino Manuzzi
Capacity: 31,000	Capacity: 21,500	Capacity: 20,194
Trieste	Udine	Serravalle (San Marino)
Stadio Nereo Rocco	Dacia Arena	San Marino Stadium
Capacity: 20,500	Capacity: 25,151	Capacity: 4,778
2019 UEFA European Under-21 Championship is located in Northern Italy

== Match officials ==
Country	Referee	1st assistant referee	2nd assistant referee
Belarus	Aleksei Kulbakov	Dzmitry Zhuk	Aleh Maslianka
Bulgaria	Georgi Kabakov	Martin Margaritov	Diyan Valkov
Israel	Orel Grinfeld	Roy Hassan	Idan Yarkoni
Latvia	Andris Treimanis	Haralds Gudermanis	Aleksejs Spasjonņikovs
Netherlands	Serdar Gözübüyük	Charles Schaap	Jan de Vries
Romania	István Kovács	Ovidiu Artene	Vasile Marinescu
Scotland	Bobby Madden	Francis Connor	David Roome
Serbia	Srđan Jovanović	Uroš Stojković	Milan Mihajlović
Sweden	Andreas Ekberg	Mehmet Culum	Stefan Hallberg

Video Assistant Referees (VAR)

- Stuart Attwell & Paul Tierney (England)
- Ricardo de Burgos Bengoetxea & Xavier Estrada Fernández (Spain)
- Ruddy Buquet & François Letexier (France)
- Christian Dingert & Tobias Stieler (Germany)
- Michael Fabbri & Marco Guida (Italy)
- Jochem Kamphuis & Bas Nijhuis (Netherlands)
- Luís Godinho & João Pinheiro (Portugal)

== Squads ==
Each national team had to submit a squad of 23 players, three of whom had to be goalkeepers, at least 10 full days before the opening match. If a player was injured or ill severely enough to prevent his participation in the tournament before his team's first match, he could be replaced by another player.

== Group stage ==
The group winners and the best runners-up advanced to the semi-finals and qualified for the 2020 Summer Olympics.

Tiebreakers

In the group stage, teams were ranked according to points (3 points for a win, 1 point for a draw, 0 points for a loss), and if tied on points, the following tiebreaking criteria would be applied, in the order given, to determine the rankings (Regulations Articles 18.01 and 18.02):

1. Points in head-to-head matches among tied teams;
2. Goal difference in head-to-head matches among tied teams;
3. Goals scored in head-to-head matches among tied teams;
4. If more than two teams are tied, and after applying all head-to-head criteria above, a subset of teams are still tied, all head-to-head criteria above would be reapplied exclusively to this subset of teams;
5. Goal difference in all group matches;
6. Goals scored in all group matches;
7. Penalty shoot-out if only two teams have the same number of points, and they met in the last round of the group and are tied after applying all criteria above (not used if more than two teams have the same number of points, or if their rankings are not relevant for qualification for the next stage);
8. Disciplinary points (red card = 3 points, yellow card = 1 point, expulsion for two yellow cards in one match = 3 points);
9. Position in the UEFA under-21 national team coefficient ranking for the final draw.

All times are local, CEST (UTC+2).

=== Group A ===
Pos	Team	Pld	W	D	L	GF	GA	GD	Pts	Qualification
1	Spain	3	2	0	1	8	4	+4	6 (Note: Head-to-head goal difference: Spain +3, Italy +1, Poland –4.)	Knockout stage and 2020 Summer Olympics
2	Italy (H)	3	2	0	1	6	3	+3	6	
3	Poland	3	2	0	1	4	7	−3	6	
4	Belgium	3	0	0	3	4	8	−4	0	

Source: UEFA
Rules for classification: Group stage tiebreakers
(H) Hosts
Notes:
16 June 2019
18:30

Poland	3–2	Belgium
Żurkowski 26'; Bielik 52'; Szymański 79'	Report	Leya Iseka 16'; Cools 84'

Mapei Stadium – Città del Tricolore, Reggio Emilia
Attendance: 2,534
Referee: István Kovács (Romania)
16 June 2019
21:00

Italy	3–1	Spain
Chiesa 36', 64'; Pellegrini 82' (pen.)	Report	Ceballos 9'

Stadio Renato Dall'Ara, Bologna
Attendance: 26,432
Referee: Serdar Gözübüyük (Netherlands)

19 June 2019
18:30

Spain	2–1	Belgium
Olmo 7'; Fornals 89'	Report	Bornauw 24'

Mapei Stadium – Città del Tricolore, Reggio Emilia
Attendance: 2,738
Referee: Andris Treimanis (Latvia)
19 June 2019
21:00

Italy	0–1	Poland
	Report	Bielik 40'

Stadio Renato Dall'Ara, Bologna
Attendance: 26,890
Referee: Aleksei Kulbakov (Belarus)

22 June 2019
21:00

Belgium	1–3	Italy
Verschaeren 79'	Report	Barella 44'; Cutrone 53'; Chiesa 89'

Mapei Stadium – Città del Tricolore, Reggio Emilia
Attendance: 20,075
Referee: Srđan Jovanović (Serbia)
22 June 2019
21:00

Spain	5–0	Poland
Fornals 17'; Oyarzabal 35'; Fabián 39'; Ceballos 71'; Mayoral 90'	Report

Stadio Renato Dall'Ara, Bologna
Attendance: 3,122
Referee: Bobby Madden (Scotland)

=== Group B ===
Pos	Team	Pld	W	D	L	GF	GA	GD	Pts	Qualification
1	Germany	3	2	1	0	10	3	+7	7	Knockout stage and 2020 Summer Olympics
2	Denmark	3	2	0	1	6	4	+2	6	
3	Austria	3	1	1	1	4	4	0	4	
4	Serbia	3	0	0	3	1	10	−9	0	

Source: UEFA
Rules for classification: Group stage tiebreakers
17 June 2019
18:30

Serbia	0–2	Austria
	Report	Wolf 37'; Horvath 78'

Stadio Nereo Rocco, Trieste
Attendance: 5,421
Referee: Andreas Ekberg (Sweden)
17 June 2019
21:00

Germany	3–1	Denmark
Richter 28', 52'; Waldschmidt 65'	Report	Skov 73' (pen.)

Dacia Arena, Udine
Attendance: 7,131
Referee: Orel Grinfeld (Israel)

20 June 2019
18:30

Denmark	3–1	Austria
Mæhle 33', 77'; Olsen 90+3'	Report	Lienhart 47'

Dacia Arena, Udine
Attendance: 7,297
Referee: Georgi Kabakov (Bulgaria)
20 June 2019
21:00

Germany	6–1	Serbia
Richter 16'; Waldschmidt 30', 37', 80'; Dahoud 69'; Maier 90+2'	Report	Živković 85' (pen.)

Stadio Nereo Rocco, Trieste
Attendance: 9,837
Referee: István Kovács (Romania)

23 June 2019
21:00

Austria	1–1	Germany
Danso 24' (pen.)	Report	Waldschmidt 14'

Dacia Arena, Udine
Attendance: 9,100
Referee: Andris Treimanis (Latvia)
23 June 2019
21:00

Denmark	2–0	Serbia
Bruun Larsen 21'; Rasmussen 51'	Report

Stadio Nereo Rocco, Trieste
Attendance: 4,543
Referee: Aleksei Kulbakov (Belarus)

=== Group C ===
Pos	Team	Pld	W	D	L	GF	GA	GD	Pts	Qualification
1	Romania	3	2	1	0	8	3	+5	7	Knockout stage and 2020 Summer Olympics
2	France	3	2	1	0	3	1	+2	7	Knockout stage and 2020 Summer Olympics
3	England (Note: England were ineligible for the Olympics.)	3	0	1	2	6	9	−3	1	
4	Croatia	3	0	1	2	4	8	−4	1	

Source: UEFA
Rules for classification: Group stage tiebreakers
Notes:
18 June 2019
18:30

Romania	4–1	Croatia
Pușcaș 11' (pen.); Hagi 14'; Băluță 66'; Petre 90+3'	Report	Vlašić 18'

San Marino Stadium, Serravalle
Attendance: 4,035
Referee: Bobby Madden (Scotland)
18 June 2019
21:00

England	1–2	France
Foden 54'	Report	Ikoné 89'; Wan-Bissaka 90+4' (o.g.)

Stadio Dino Manuzzi, Cesena
Attendance: 11,288
Referee: Srđan Jovanović (Serbia)

21 June 2019
18:30

England	2–4	Romania
Gray 79'; Abraham 87'	Report	Pușcaș 76' (pen.); Hagi 85'; Coman 89', 90+3'

Stadio Dino Manuzzi, Cesena
Attendance: 8,440
Referee: Andreas Ekberg (Sweden)
21 June 2019
21:00

France	1–0	Croatia
Dembélé 8'	Report

San Marino Stadium, Serravalle
Attendance: 3,416
Referee: Serdar Gözübüyük (Netherlands)

24 June 2019
21:00

Croatia	3–3	England
Brekalo 39', 82'; Vlašić 62'	Report	Nelson 11' (pen.); Maddison 48'; Kenny 70'

San Marino Stadium, Serravalle
Attendance: 3,512
Referee: Orel Grinfeld (Israel)
24 June 2019
21:00

France	0–0	Romania
	Report

Stadio Dino Manuzzi, Cesena
Attendance: 12,861
Referee: Georgi Kabakov (Bulgaria)

=== Ranking of second-placed teams ===
Pos	Grp	Team	Pld	W	D	L	GF	GA	GD	Pts	Qualification
1	C	France	3	2	1	0	3	1	+2	7	Knockout stage and 2020 Summer Olympics
2	A	Italy	3	2	0	1	6	3	+3	6	
3	B	Denmark	3	2	0	1	6	4	+2	6	

Source: UEFA
Rules for classification: 1) points; 2) goal difference; 3) goals scored; 4) disciplinary points; 5) coefficient (Regulations Article 18.03).

The match-ups of the semi-finals depended on which runners-up qualified (Regulations Article 17.02):

Scenario according to the best runners-up

Best runners-up from	Best runners-up play	Other semi-final
Group A	Winners of Group B	Winners of Group A vs Winners of Group C
Group B	Winners of Group A	Winners of Group B vs Winners of Group C
Group C	Winners of Group A	Winners of Group B vs Winners of Group C

== Knockout stage ==
In the knockout stage, extra time and a penalty shoot-out were used to decide the winners if necessary.

=== Bracket ===
Semi-finals
27 June – Reggio Emilia
Spain	4
France	1
27 June – Bologna
Germany	4
Romania	2

Final
30 June – Udine
Spain	2
Germany	1

=== Semi-finals ===
27 June 2019
18:00

Germany	4–2	Romania
Amiri 21', 90+4'; Waldschmidt 51' (pen.), 90'	Report	Pușcaș 26' (pen.), 44'

Stadio Renato Dall'Ara, Bologna
Attendance: 16,211
Referee: Orel Grinfeld (Israel)

27 June 2019
21:00

Spain	4–1	France
Roca 28'; Oyarzabal 45+5' (pen.); Olmo 47'; Mayoral 67'	Report	Mateta 16' (pen.)

Mapei Stadium – Città del Tricolore, Reggio Emilia
Attendance: 6,522
Referee: Georgi Kabakov (Bulgaria)

=== Final ===
30 June 2019
20:45

Spain	2–1	Germany
Fabián 7'; Olmo 69'	Report	Amiri 88'

Dacia Arena, Udine
Attendance: 23,232
Referee: Srđan Jovanović (Serbia)

== Goalscorers ==
There were 78 goals scored in 21 matches, for an average of 3.71 goals per match.

7 goals

- (Germany) Luca Waldschmidt

4 goals

- (Romania) George Pușcaș

3 goals

- (Germany) Nadiem Amiri
- (Germany) Marco Richter
- (Italy) Federico Chiesa
- (Spain) Dani Olmo

2 goals

- (Croatia) Josip Brekalo
- (Croatia) Nikola Vlašić
- (Denmark) Joakim Mæhle
- (Poland) Krystian Bielik
- (Romania) Florinel Coman
- (Romania) Ianis Hagi
- (Spain) Dani Ceballos
- (Spain) Pablo Fornals
- (Spain) Borja Mayoral
- (Spain) Mikel Oyarzabal
- (Spain) Fabián Ruiz

1 goal

- (Austria) Kevin Danso
- (Austria) Sascha Horvath
- (Austria) Philipp Lienhart
- (Austria) Hannes Wolf
- (Belgium) Sebastiaan Bornauw
- (Belgium) Dion Cools
- (Belgium) Aaron Leya Iseka
- (Belgium) Yari Verschaeren
- (Denmark) Jacob Bruun Larsen
- (Denmark) Jacob Rasmussen
- (Denmark) Andreas Skov Olsen
- (Denmark) Robert Skov
- (England) Tammy Abraham
- (England) Phil Foden
- (England) Demarai Gray
- (England) Jonjoe Kenny
- (England) James Maddison
- (England) Reiss Nelson
- (France) Moussa Dembélé
- (France) Jonathan Ikoné
- (France) Jean-Philippe Mateta
- (Germany) Mahmoud Dahoud
- (Germany) Arne Maier
- (Italy) Nicolò Barella
- (Italy) Patrick Cutrone
- (Italy) Lorenzo Pellegrini
- (Poland) Sebastian Szymański
- (Poland) Szymon Żurkowski
- (Romania) Tudor Băluță
- (Romania) Adrian Petre
- (Serbia) Andrija Živković
- (Spain) Marc Roca

1 own goal

- (England) Aaron Wan-Bissaka (against France)

== Awards ==
The following awards were given at the conclusion of the tournament:

- Player of the Tournament: (Spain) Fabián Ruiz
- Golden Boot: (Germany) Luca Waldschmidt

=== Team of the tournament ===
After the tournament the Under-21 Team of the Tournament was selected by the UEFA Technical Observers.

Position	Player
Goalkeeper	(Germany) Alexander Nübel
Defenders	(Germany) Lukas Klostermann
Defenders	(Germany) Jonathan Tah
Defenders	(Spain) Jesús Vallejo
Defenders	(Germany) Benjamin Henrichs
Midfielders	(Spain) Fabián Ruiz
Midfielders	(Germany) Mahmoud Dahoud
Midfielders	(Spain) Dani Olmo
Midfielders	(Germany) Luca Waldschmidt
Midfielders	(Spain) Dani Ceballos
Forward	(Romania) George Pușcaș

== Qualified teams for 2020 Summer Olympics ==
The following four teams from UEFA qualified for the 2020 Summer Olympic men's football tournament.

Team	Qualified on	Previous appearances in Summer Olympics^{1}
Spain	22 June 2019	10 (1920, 1924, 1928, 1968, 1976, 1980, **1992**, 1996, 2000, 2012)
Germany	23 June 2019	9 (1912, 1928, 1936, 1952, 1956^{2}, 1972^{2}, 1984^{2}, 1988^{2}, 2016)
Romania	24 June 2019	3 (1924, 1952, 1964)
France	24 June 2019	12 (1900, 1908, 1920, 1924, 1928, 1948, 1952, 1960, 1968, 1976, **1984**, 1996)

^{1} Bold indicates champions for that year. Italic indicates hosts for that year.
^{2} The team represented the United Team of Germany in 1956, and the Federal Republic of Germany (i.e., West Germany) in 1972, 1984 and 1988.

England were ineligible for the Olympics as they are not an Olympic nation (while an agreement was reached between the four British football associations to enter the Great Britain women's team, no agreement was reached for the men's team). Had they reached the semi-finals, the last Olympic spot would have gone to the winner of an Olympic play-off match, scheduled to be played at Stadio Dino Manuzzi, Cesena on 28 June 2019, 21:00 CEST, between the two group runners-up which did not qualify for the semi-finals. However, when England failed to advance out of the group stage, this match was cancelled.

== International broadcasters ==
=== Television ===
All 21 matches were live streamed for the unsold markets via UEFA.tv and highlights were also available for all territories around the world via the UEFA YouTube channel.

==== Participating nations ====
Country	Broadcaster	
Country	Free	Pay
Italy (host)	RAI	
Austria	ORF	
Austria	Sport1	
Germany	Sport1	
Germany	ARD	
Germany	ZDF	
Belgium	VRT (Dutch)	
Belgium	RTBF (French)	
Croatia	HRT	
Denmark	DR	
France	M6	beIN Sports
Poland	TVP	
Romania	TVR	
Serbia	RTS	
Spain	Mediaset	
United Kingdom		Sky Sports

==== Non-participating European nations ====
Country/Region	Broadcaster	
Country/Region	Free	Pay
Albania	RTSH	
Andorra	Mediaset (Spanish)	beIN Sports (French)
Andorra	M6 (French)	beIN Sports (French)
Luxembourg	M6 (French)	beIN Sports (French)
Luxembourg	RTBF (French)	beIN Sports (French)
Luxembourg	VRT (Dutch)	beIN Sports (French)
Armenia	APMTV	
Belarus	Belteleradio	
Bosnia and Herzegovina	BHRT	
Bulgaria	BNT	
Czech Republic	ČT	
Estonia	ERR	
Faroe Islands	DR	
Finland	Yle	
Greece	ERT	
Hungary	MTVA	
Ireland	RTÉ	Sky Sports
Israel	Charlton	
Kosovo	RTK	
Latvia	LTV	
Liechtenstein	SRG SSR (German, French, and Italian)	
Switzerland	SRG SSR (German, French, and Italian)	
Switzerland	Sport1 (German)	
Lithuania	LRT	
Malta	PBS	
Montenegro	RTCG	
Netherlands	NOS	
Norway	NRK	
Portugal	RTP	
Russia	Match TV	
San Marino	RAI	
Vatican City	RAI	
Slovakia	RTVS	
Slovenia	RTV SLO	
Sweden	SVT	
Turkey	TRT	
Ukraine	UA:PBC	

==== Outside Europe ====
Country/Region	Broadcaster	
Country/Region	Free	Pay
China	CCTV	Super Sports
Indonesia	Super Soccer TV	
Japan		Wowow
Latin American countries: Argentina; Bolivia; Chile; Colombia; Costa Rica; Dominican Republic; Ecuador; El Salvador; Guatemala; Honduras; Mexico; Nicaragua; Panama; Paraguay; Peru; Puerto Rico; Uruguay; Venezuela	Televideo; CIE Group; Univision-Televisa; Telemundo-TV Azteca	PSN; ESPN; Univision Internacional; Telemundo Internacional
United States	Univision; Telemundo	PSN; ESPN; TSN; Sportsnet
Canada	Univision Canada; Telemundo Canada	PSN; ESPN; The Sports Network; Sportsnet
MENA: Algeria; Bahrain; Chad; Comoros; Djibouti; Egypt; Iran; Iraq; Jordan; Kuwait; Lebanon; Libya; Mauritania; Morocco; Oman; Qatar; Saudi Arabia; Somalia; Palestine; Sudan; Syria; Tunisia; United Arab Emirates; Yemen	African Television	beIN Sports

=== Radio ===
==== Participating nations ====
Country	Broadcaster
Italy (host)	RAI
Austria	ORF
Austria	Sport1
Germany	Sport1
Germany	ARD
Belgium	VRT (Dutch)
Belgium	RTBF (French)
Croatia	HRT
Denmark	DR
Poland	PR
Romania	RR
Serbia	RTS
Spain	Marca
United Kingdom	Talksport

==== Non-participating European nations ====
Country/Region	Broadcaster
Albania	RTSH
Andorra	RTBF (French)
Luxembourg	RTBF (French)
Armenia	HR
Belarus	Belteleradio
Bosnia and Herzegovina	BHRT
Bulgaria	BNR
Czech Republic	ČR
Estonia	ERR
Faroe Islands	DR
Finland	Yle
Greece	ERT
Hungary	MTVA
Ireland	RTÉ
Kosovo	RTK
Latvia	LR
Liechtenstein	SRG SSR (German, French, and Italian)
Switzerland	SRG SSR (German, French, and Italian)
Switzerland	Sport1 (German)
Lithuania	LRT
Malta	PBS
Montenegro	RTCG
Netherlands	NOS
Norway	NRK
Portugal	RTP
San Marino	RAI
Vatican City	RAI
Slovakia	RTVS
Slovenia	RTV SLO
Sweden	SR
Turkey	TRT
Ukraine	UA:PBC

==== Outside Europe ====
Country/Region	Broadcaster
China	CRI
Latin American countries: Argentina; Bolivia; Chile; Colombia; Costa Rica; Dominican Republic; Ecuador; El Salvador; Guatemala; Honduras; Mexico; Nicaragua; Panama; Paraguay; Peru; Puerto Rico; Uruguay; Venezuela	PSN; ESPN; Univision (Puerto Rico, USA and Canada only); Telemundo (Puerto Rico, USA and Canada only)
United States	PSN; ESPN; Univision (Puerto Rico, USA and Canada only); Telemundo (Puerto Rico, USA and Canada only)
Canada	PSN; ESPN; Univision (Puerto Rico, USA and Canada only); Telemundo (Puerto Rico, USA and Canada only)
