= 2023 UEFA Nations League final =

- Match programme cover
- Event: 2023 UEFA Nations League Finals
Croatia	Spain
0	0
- After extra time Spain won 5–4 on penalties
- Date: 18 June 2023
- Venue: Stadion Feijenoord (De Kuip), Rotterdam
- Man of the Match: Marcelo Brozović (Croatia)
- Referee: Felix Zwayer (Germany)
- Attendance: 41,110
- Weather: Partly cloudy night 25 °C (77 °F); 69% humidity

The 2023 UEFA Nations League final was a football match that determined the winners of the final tournament of the 2022–23 UEFA Nations League. It was the third final of the international football competition involving the men's national teams of the member associations of UEFA. The match was held on 18 June 2023 at De Kuip in Rotterdam, Netherlands, and was contested by Croatia and Spain.

Spain won the match 5–4 on penalties following a 0–0 draw after extra time for their first UEFA Nations League title.

== Venue ==
De Kuip was chosen by the Royal Dutch Football Association as one of the two venues for the Nations League Finals, along with De Grolsch Veste. Amsterdam's Johan Cruyff Arena, which is the largest stadium in the Netherlands, was unavailable because of a concert. Consequently, De Kuip, the second-largest stadium in the country, was selected to host the first semi-final, featuring the Dutch team, as well as the final.

De Kuip (Dutch for "the Tub"), officially known as the Stadion Feijenoord, is situated in the Feijenoord district of Rotterdam. The stadium, characterised by its distinctive bowl-shaped design, has a seating capacity of 51,117 and is the home of Eredivisie club Feyenoord. Construction began on the stadium in 1935, and it opened in March 1937. The stadium underwent extensive renovations in 1994, becoming an all-seater, with an extended roof to cover all seats. The venue hosts selected matches of the Netherlands national team, and has also been the site of the KNVB Cup final since 1989. De Kuip has hosted numerous UEFA club finals, including two in the European Cup (1972 and 1982), six in the UEFA Cup Winners' Cup (1963, 1968, 1974, 1985, 1991 and 1997) and two in the UEFA Cup (the 1974 second leg and 2002). In addition, it was one of the venues for UEFA Euro 2000, hosting five matches, including the final between France and Italy. The stadium has also been used as a concert venue since 1978.

== Route to the final ==
Note: In all results below, the score of the finalist is given first (H: home; A: away).

Croatia
Round
Spain
Opponents
Result
League phase
Opponents
Result
Austria
0–3 (H)
Match 1
Portugal
1–1 (H)
France
1–1 (H)
Match 2
Czech Republic
2–2 (A)
Denmark
1–0 (A)
Match 3
Switzerland
1–0 (A)
France
1–0 (A)
Match 4
Czech Republic
2–0 (H)
Denmark
2–1 (H)
Match 5
Switzerland
1–2 (H)
Austria
3–1 (A)
Match 6
Portugal
1–0 (A)
Group A1 winner

Pos	Team	Pld	Pts
1	Croatia	6	13
2	Denmark	6	12
3	France	6	5
4	Austria (R)	6	4

Source: UEFA
(R) Relegated
Final standings
Group A2 winner

Pos	Team	Pld	Pts
1	Spain	6	11
2	Portugal	6	10
3	Switzerland	6	9
4	Czech Republic (R)	6	4

Source: UEFA
(R) Relegated
Opponents
Result
Nations League Finals
Opponents
Result
Netherlands
4–2 (a.e.t.)
Semi-finals
Italy
2–1

== Match ==
=== Summary ===
In the 84th minute Spain's Ansu Fati had a shot cleared off the line by Ivan Perišić. After a goalless match the game went to extra-time and finally to penalties. The first six penalties were all scored before Spanish goalkeeper Unai Simón saved with his foot from Lovro Majer. Both teams scored another penalty before Aymeric Laporte had the chance to win the game but hit his shot off the bar. Simón then saved down to his right from Bruno Petković with Dani Carvajal going on to win it for Spain by chipping into the net for a 5–4 win.

=== Details ===
18 June 2023
20:45 UTC+2

Croatia	0–0 (a.e.t.)	Spain
	Report
Penalties
Vlašić (penalty scored); Brozović (penalty scored); Modrić (penalty scored); Majer (penalty missed); Perišić (penalty scored); Petković (penalty missed)	4–5	(penalty scored) Joselu; (penalty scored) Rodri; (penalty scored) Merino; (penalty scored) Asensio; (penalty missed) Laporte; (penalty scored) Carvajal

De Kuip, Rotterdam
Attendance: 41,110
Referee: Felix Zwayer (Germany)

Croatia	Spain

GK	1	Dominik Livaković
RB	22	Josip Juranović		(substituted off) 112'
CB	6	Josip Šutalo
CB	5	Martin Erlić
LB	14	Ivan Perišić
DM	11	Marcelo Brozović
CM	10	Luka Modrić (c)
CM	8	Mateo Kovačić
RW	15	Mario Pašalić		(substituted off) 61'
LW	16	Luka Ivanušec		(substituted off) 78'
CF	9	Andrej Kramarić		(substituted off) 90+1'
Substitutions:
FW	17	Bruno Petković	(yellow card) 90+2'	(substituted on) 61'
MF	13	Nikola Vlašić		(substituted on) 78'
MF	7	Lovro Majer		(substituted on) 90+1'
DF	2	Josip Stanišić		(substituted on) 112'
Manager:
Zlatko Dalić

GK	23	Unai Simón
RB	22	Jesús Navas		(substituted off) 97'
CB	3	Robin Le Normand		(substituted off) 78'
CB	14	Aymeric Laporte
LB	18	Jordi Alba (c)
CM	16	Rodri	(yellow card) 97'
CM	8	Fabián Ruiz		(substituted off) 78'
RW	10	Marco Asensio
AM	9	Gavi	(yellow card) 81'	(substituted off) 87'
LW	15	Yéremy Pino		(substituted off) 66'
CF	7	Álvaro Morata		(substituted off) 66'
Substitutions:
FW	12	Ansu Fati		(substituted on) 66'
FW	20	Joselu		(substituted on) 66'
MF	6	Mikel Merino		(substituted on) 78'
DF	4	Nacho	(yellow card) 96'	(substituted on) 78'
FW	21	Dani Olmo		(substituted on) 87'
DF	2	Dani Carvajal		(substituted on) 97'
Manager:
Luis de la Fuente

Man of the Match:
Marcelo Brozović (Croatia)

Assistant referees:
Stefan Lupp (Germany)
Marco Achmüller (Germany)
Fourth official:
Ivan Kružliak (Slovakia)
Video assistant referee:
Marco Fritz (Germany)
Assistant video assistant referees:
Sven Jablonski (Germany)
Stuart Attwell (England)

Match rules

- 90 minutes
- 30 minutes of extra time if necessary
- Penalty shoot-out if scores still level
- Maximum of twelve named substitutes
- Maximum of five substitutions, with a sixth allowed in extra time (Note: Each team was given only three opportunities to make substitutions, with a fourth opportunity in extra time, excluding substitutions made at half-time, before the start of extra time and at half-time in extra time.)

=== Statistics ===
First half
Statistic	Croatia	Spain
Goals scored	0	0
Total shots	4	6
Shots on target	3	0
Saves	1	3
Ball possession	47%	53%
Corner kicks	1	2
Fouls committed	5	8
Offsides	1	2
Yellow cards	0	0
Red cards	0	0

Second half
Statistic	Croatia	Spain
Goals scored	0	0
Total shots	3	9
Shots on target	0	1
Saves	1	0
Ball possession	51%	49%
Corner kicks	1	1
Fouls committed	4	7
Offsides	1	0
Yellow cards	1	1
Red cards	0	0

Extra time
Statistic	Croatia	Spain
Goals scored	0	0
Total shots	5	6
Shots on target	2	0
Saves	0	2
Ball possession	46%	54%
Corner kicks	2	5
Fouls committed	2	3
Offsides	0	0
Yellow cards	0	2
Red cards	0	0

Overall
Statistic	Croatia	Spain
Goals scored	0	0
Total shots	12	21
Shots on target	5	1
Saves	2	5
Ball possession	48%	52%
Corner kicks	4	8
Fouls committed	11	18
Offsides	2	2
Yellow cards	1	3
Red cards	0	0
