= 2022–23 UEFA Nations League A =

Tournament details
- Dates: League phase: 1 June – 27 September 2022; Nations League Finals: 14–18 June 2023
- Teams: 16

Final positions
- Champions: Spain (1st title)
- Runners-up: Croatia
- Third place: Italy
- Fourth place: Netherlands
- Relegated: Austria; Czech Republic; England; Wales

Tournament statistics
- Matches played: 52
- Goals scored: 140 (2.69 per match)
- Attendance: 1,909,171 (36,715 per match)
- Top scorer(s): (Belgium) Michy Batshuayi (Croatia) Luka Modrić (Netherlands) Steven Bergwijn (Netherlands) Memphis Depay (3 goals each)

The 2022–23 UEFA Nations League A was the top division of the 2022–23 edition of the UEFA Nations League, the third season of the international football competition involving the men's national teams of the 55 member associations of UEFA. League A culminated with the Nations League Finals in June 2023 to determine the champions of the competition.

Following their win in 2021, defending champions France were unable to retain their title in the finals after finishing third in their group.

Spain won the final against Croatia, 5–4 on penalties following a 0–0 draw after extra time, for their first UEFA Nations League title.

== Format ==
League A consisted of the 16 top-ranked UEFA members in the 2022–23 UEFA Nations League access list, split into four groups of four. Each team played six matches within their group, using the home-and-away round-robin format in June (four matchdays) and September 2022 (two matchdays). The winners of each group advanced to the 2023 UEFA Nations League Finals, and the fourth-placed team from each group was relegated to the 2024–25 UEFA Nations League B.

The Nations League Finals took place in June 2023 and was played in a knockout format, consisting of the semi-finals, third place play-off and final. The semi-final pairings were determined by means of an open draw. The host country was selected among the four qualified teams by the UEFA Executive Committee, with the winners of the final crowned as the champions of the UEFA Nations League.

The four group winners were drawn into groups of five teams for UEFA Euro 2024 qualifying (in order to accommodate for the Nations League Finals).

== Teams ==
=== Team changes ===
The following were the team changes in League A from the 2020–21 season:

Incoming
Promoted from
Nations League B
- Austria
- Czech Republic
- Hungary
- Wales

Outgoing
Relegated to
Nations League B
- Bosnia and Herzegovina
- Iceland
- Sweden
- Ukraine

=== Seeding ===
In the 2022–23 access list, UEFA ranked teams based on the 2020–21 Nations League overall ranking. The seeding pots for the league phase were confirmed on 22 September 2021, and were based on the access list ranking.

Pot 1
Team	Rank
France (title holders)	1
Spain	2
Italy	3
Belgium	4

Pot 2
Team	Rank
Portugal	5
Netherlands	6
Denmark	7
Germany	8

Pot 3
Team	Rank
England	9
Poland	10
Switzerland	11
Croatia	12

Pot 4
Team	Rank
Wales	13
Austria	14
Czech Republic	15
Hungary	16

The draw for the league phase took place at the UEFA headquarters in Nyon, Switzerland on 16 December 2021, 18:00 CET. Each group contained one team from each pot.

== Groups ==
The fixture list was confirmed by UEFA on 17 December 2021, the day following the draw. The fixture list for Group 4 was amended due to the postponement of Path A of UEFA qualifying for the World Cup.

Times are CEST (UTC+2), as listed by UEFA (local times, if different, are in parentheses).

=== Group 1 ===
Pos	Team	Pld	W	D	L	GF	GA	GD	Pts	Qualification or relegation	(Croatia)	(Denmark)	(France)	(Austria)
1	Croatia	6	4	1	1	8	6	+2	13	Qualification for Nations League Finals	—	2–1	1–1	0–3
2	Denmark	6	4	0	2	9	5	+4	12		0–1	—	2–0	2–0
3	France	6	1	2	3	5	7	−2	5		0–1	1–2	—	2–0
4	Austria (R)	6	1	1	4	6	10	−4	4	Relegation to League B	1–3	1–2	1–1	—

Source: UEFA
Rules for classification: Tiebreakers
(R) Relegated
3 June 2022
20:45

Croatia	0–3	Austria
	Report	Arnautović 41'; Gregoritsch 54'; Sabitzer 57'

Gradski Vrt Stadium, Osijek
Attendance: 13,994
Referee: Chris Kavanagh (England)
3 June 2022
20:45

France	1–2	Denmark
Benzema 51'	Report	Cornelius 68', 88'

Stade de France, Saint-Denis
Attendance: 75,833
Referee: Felix Zwayer (Germany)

6 June 2022
20:45

Croatia	1–1	France
Kramarić 83' (pen.)	Report	Rabiot 52'

Stadion Poljud, Split
Attendance: 30,000
Referee: Marco Guida (Italy)
6 June 2022
22:15 (Note: The Austria v Denmark match, originally scheduled to kick-off at 20:45, was delayed to 22:15 due to a power outage in the stadium area.)

Austria	1–2	Denmark
Schlager 67'	Report	Højbjerg 28'; Stryger Larsen 84'

Ernst-Happel-Stadion, Vienna
Attendance: 18,700
Referee: Willie Collum (Scotland)

10 June 2022
20:45

Austria	1–1	France
Weimann 37'	Report	Mbappé 83'

Ernst-Happel-Stadion, Vienna
Attendance: 44,800
Referee: Anastasios Sidiropoulos (Greece)
10 June 2022
20:45

Denmark	0–1	Croatia
	Report	Pašalić 69'

Parken Stadium, Copenhagen
Attendance: 35,862
Referee: Bartosz Frankowski (Poland)

13 June 2022
20:45

Denmark	2–0	Austria
Wind 21'; Skov Olsen 37'	Report

Parken Stadium, Copenhagen
Attendance: 35,230
Referee: Alejandro Hernández Hernández (Spain)
13 June 2022
20:45

France	0–1	Croatia
	Report	Modrić 5' (pen.)

Stade de France, Saint-Denis
Attendance: 77,410
Referee: Orel Grinfeld (Israel)

22 September 2022
20:45

Croatia	2–1	Denmark
Sosa 49'; Majer 79'	Report	Eriksen 77'

Stadion Maksimir, Zagreb
Attendance: 22,715
Referee: Davide Massa (Italy)
22 September 2022
20:45

France	2–0	Austria
Mbappé 56'; Giroud 65'	Report

Stade de France, Saint-Denis
Attendance: 70,188
Referee: Andreas Ekberg (Sweden)

25 September 2022
20:45

Austria	1–3	Croatia
Baumgartner 9'	Report	Modrić 6'; Livaja 69'; Lovren 72'

Ernst-Happel-Stadion, Vienna
Attendance: 45,700
Referee: Artur Soares Dias (Portugal)
25 September 2022
20:45

Denmark	2–0	France
Dolberg 34'; Skov Olsen 39'	Report

Parken Stadium, Copenhagen
Attendance: 36,064
Referee: István Kovács (Romania)

=== Group 2 ===
Pos	Team	Pld	W	D	L	GF	GA	GD	Pts	Qualification or relegation	(Spain)	(Portugal)	(Switzerland)	(Czech Republic)
1	Spain (C)	6	3	2	1	8	5	+3	11	Qualification for Nations League Finals	—	1–1	1–2	2–0
2	Portugal	6	3	1	2	11	3	+8	10		0–1	—	4–0	2–0
3	Switzerland	6	3	0	3	6	9	−3	9		0–1	1–0	—	2–1
4	Czech Republic (R)	6	1	1	4	5	13	−8	4	Relegation to League B	2–2	0–4	2–1	—

Source: UEFA
Rules for classification: Tiebreakers
(C) Champions; (R) Relegated
2 June 2022
20:45

Czech Republic	2–1	Switzerland
Kuchta 11'; Sow 58' (o.g.)	Report	Okafor 44'

Sinobo Stadium, Prague
Attendance: 12,236
Referee: Daniel Siebert (Germany) (Note: Daniel Siebert was substituted by the fourth official Harm Osmers (Germany) due to injury on the 75th minute.)
2 June 2022
20:45

Spain	1–1	Portugal
Morata 25'	Report	Horta 82'

Benito Villamarín, Seville
Attendance: 41,236
Referee: Michael Oliver (England)

5 June 2022
20:45

Czech Republic	2–2	Spain
Pešek 4'; Kuchta 66'	Report	Gavi 45+3'; Martínez 90'

Sinobo Stadium, Prague
Attendance: 18,245
Referee: François Letexier (France)
5 June 2022
20:45 (19:45 UTC+1)

Portugal	4–0	Switzerland
Carvalho 15'; Ronaldo 35', 39'; Cancelo 68'	Report

Estádio José Alvalade, Lisbon
Attendance: 42,325
Referee: Orel Grinfeld (Israel)

9 June 2022
20:45 (19:45 UTC+1)

Portugal	2–0	Czech Republic
Cancelo 33'; Guedes 38'	Report

Estádio José Alvalade, Lisbon
Attendance: 44,100
Referee: Matej Jug (Slovenia)
9 June 2022
20:45

Switzerland	0–1	Spain
	Report	Sarabia 13'

Stade de Genève, Geneva
Attendance: 25,875
Referee: Serdar Gözübüyük (Netherlands)

12 June 2022
20:45

Spain	2–0	Czech Republic
Soler 24'; Sarabia 75'	Report

La Rosaleda, Málaga
Attendance: 30,389
Referee: Cüneyt Çakır (Turkey)
12 June 2022
20:45

Switzerland	1–0	Portugal
Seferovic 1'	Report

Stade de Genève, Geneva
Attendance: 26,300
Referee: Fran Jović (Croatia)

24 September 2022
20:45

Czech Republic	0–4	Portugal
	Report	Dalot 33', 52'; Fernandes 45+2'; Jota 82'

Fortuna Arena, Prague
Attendance: 19,322
Referee: Srđan Jovanović (Serbia)
24 September 2022
20:45

Spain	1–2	Switzerland
Alba 55'	Report	Akanji 21'; Embolo 59'

La Romareda, Zaragoza
Attendance: 31,809
Referee: Clément Turpin (France)

27 September 2022
20:45 (19:45 UTC+1)

Portugal	0–1	Spain
	Report	Morata 88'

Estádio Municipal, Braga
Attendance: 28,196
Referee: Daniele Orsato (Italy)
27 September 2022
20:45

Switzerland	2–1	Czech Republic
Freuler 29'; Embolo 30'	Report	Schick 45'

Kybunpark, St. Gallen
Attendance: 13,353
Referee: Irfan Peljto (Bosnia and Herzegovina)

=== Group 3 ===
Pos	Team	Pld	W	D	L	GF	GA	GD	Pts	Qualification or relegation	(Italy)	(Hungary)	(Germany)	(England)
1	Italy	6	3	2	1	8	7	+1	11	Qualification for Nations League Finals	—	2–1	1–1	1–0
2	Hungary	6	3	1	2	8	5	+3	10		0–2	—	1–1	1–0
3	Germany	6	1	4	1	11	9	+2	7		5–2	0–1	—	1–1
4	England (R)	6	0	3	3	4	10	−6	3	Relegation to League B	0–0	0–4	3–3	—

Source: UEFA
Rules for classification: Tiebreakers
(R) Relegated
4 June 2022
18:00

Hungary	1–0	England
Szoboszlai 66' (pen.)	Report

Puskás Aréna, Budapest
Attendance: 26,935 (Note: The Hungarian Football Federation were ordered to play behind closed doors due to sanctions by UEFA. They were permitted to distribute tickets to under-14s, with one adult supervising every ten children.)
Referee: Artur Soares Dias (Portugal)
4 June 2022
20:45

Italy	1–1	Germany
Pellegrini 70'	Report	Kimmich 73'

Stadio Renato Dall'Ara, Bologna
Attendance: 23,754
Referee: Srđan Jovanović (Serbia)

7 June 2022
20:45

Germany	1–1	England
Hofmann 50'	Report	Kane 88' (pen.)

Allianz Arena, Munich
Attendance: 66,289
Referee: Carlos del Cerro Grande (Spain)
7 June 2022
20:45

Italy	2–1	Hungary
Barella 30'; Pellegrini 45'	Report	Mancini 61' (o.g.)

Stadio Dino Manuzzi, Cesena
Attendance: 14,942
Referee: Sandro Schärer (Switzerland)

11 June 2022
20:45 (19:45 UTC+1)

England	0–0	Italy
	Report

Molineux Stadium, Wolverhampton
Attendance: 1,782 (Note: The Football Association were ordered to play behind closed doors due to sanctions by UEFA. They were permitted to distribute tickets to under-14s, with one adult supervising every ten children.)
Referee: Szymon Marciniak (Poland)
11 June 2022
20:45

Hungary	1–1	Germany
Zs. Nagy 6'	Report	Hofmann 9'

Puskás Aréna, Budapest
Attendance: 55,948
Referee: José María Sánchez Martínez (Spain)

14 June 2022
20:45 (19:45 UTC+1)

England	0–4	Hungary
	Report	Sallai 16', 70'; Zs. Nagy 80'; Gazdag 89'

Molineux Stadium, Wolverhampton
Attendance: 28,839
Referee: Clément Turpin (France)
14 June 2022
20:45

Germany	5–2	Italy
Kimmich 10'; Gündoğan 45+4' (pen.); Müller 51'; Werner 68', 69'	Report	Gnonto 78'; Bastoni 90+4'

Borussia-Park, Mönchengladbach
Attendance: 44,144
Referee: István Kovács (Romania)

23 September 2022
20:45

Germany	0–1	Hungary
	Report	Szalai 17'

Red Bull Arena, Leipzig
Attendance: 39,513
Referee: Slavko Vinčić (Slovenia)
23 September 2022
20:45

Italy	1–0	England
Raspadori 68'	Report

San Siro, Milan
Attendance: 50,640
Referee: Jesús Gil Manzano (Spain)

26 September 2022
20:45 (19:45 UTC+1)

England	3–3	Germany
Shaw 72'; Mount 75'; Kane 83' (pen.)	Report	Gündoğan 52' (pen.); Havertz 67', 87'

Wembley Stadium, London
Attendance: 78,949
Referee: Danny Makkelie (Netherlands)
26 September 2022
20:45

Hungary	0–2	Italy
	Report	Raspadori 27'; Dimarco 52'

Puskás Aréna, Budapest
Attendance: 57,300
Referee: Benoît Bastien (France)

=== Group 4 ===
Pos	Team	Pld	W	D	L	GF	GA	GD	Pts	Qualification or relegation	(Netherlands)	(Belgium)	(Poland)	(Wales)
1	Netherlands	6	5	1	0	14	6	+8	16	Qualification for Nations League Finals	—	1–0	2–2	3–2
2	Belgium	6	3	1	2	11	8	+3	10		1–4	—	6–1	2–1
3	Poland	6	2	1	3	6	12	−6	7		0–2	0–1	—	2–1
4	Wales (R)	6	0	1	5	6	11	−5	1	Relegation to League B	1–2	1–1	0–1	—

Source: UEFA
Rules for classification: Tiebreakers
(R) Relegated
1 June 2022
18:00

Poland	2–1	Wales
Kamiński 72'; Świderski 85'	Report	J. Williams 52'

Stadion Wrocław, Wrocław
Attendance: 35,214
Referee: Rade Obrenovič (Slovenia)
3 June 2022
20:45

Belgium	1–4	Netherlands
Batshuayi 90+3'	Report	Bergwijn 40'; Depay 51', 65'; Dumfries 61'

King Baudouin Stadium, Brussels
Attendance: 38,327
Referee: José María Sánchez Martínez (Spain)

8 June 2022
20:45

Belgium	6–1	Poland
Witsel 42'; De Bruyne 59'; Trossard 73', 80'; Dendoncker 83'; Openda 90+3'	Report	Lewandowski 28'

King Baudouin Stadium, Brussels
Attendance: 27,409
Referee: Ivan Kružliak (Slovakia)
8 June 2022
20:45 (19:45 UTC+1)

Wales	1–2	Netherlands
Norrington-Davies 90+2'	Report	Koopmeiners 50'; Weghorst 90+4'

Cardiff City Stadium, Cardiff
Attendance: 23,395
Referee: Glenn Nyberg (Sweden)

11 June 2022
20:45

Netherlands	2–2	Poland
Klaassen 51'; Dumfries 54'	Report	Cash 18'; Zieliński 49'

De Kuip, Rotterdam
Attendance: 39,382
Referee: Halil Umut Meler (Turkey)
11 June 2022
20:45 (19:45 UTC+1)

Wales	1–1	Belgium
Johnson 86'	Report	Tielemans 51'

Cardiff City Stadium, Cardiff
Attendance: 27,188
Referee: Benoît Bastien (France)

14 June 2022
20:45

Netherlands	3–2	Wales
Lang 17'; Gakpo 23'; Depay 90+3'	Report	Johnson 26'; Bale 90+2' (pen.)

De Kuip, Rotterdam
Attendance: 37,247
Referee: Horațiu Feșnic (Romania)
14 June 2022
20:45

Poland	0–1	Belgium
	Report	Batshuayi 16'

Stadion Narodowy, Warsaw
Attendance: 56,803
Referee: Irfan Peljto (Bosnia and Herzegovina)

22 September 2022
20:45

Belgium	2–1	Wales
De Bruyne 10'; Batshuayi 37'	Report	Moore 50'

King Baudouin Stadium, Brussels
Attendance: 28,463
Referee: Ali Palabıyık (Turkey)
22 September 2022
20:45

Poland	0–2	Netherlands
	Report	Gakpo 13'; Bergwijn 60'

Stadion Narodowy, Warsaw
Attendance: 56,673
Referee: Alejandro Hernández Hernández (Spain)

25 September 2022
20:45

Netherlands	1–0	Belgium
Van Dijk 73'	Report

Johan Cruyff Arena, Amsterdam
Attendance: 52,314
Referee: Anthony Taylor (England)
25 September 2022
20:45 (19:45 UTC+1)

Wales	0–1	Poland
	Report	Świderski 58'

Cardiff City Stadium, Cardiff
Attendance: 31,520
Referee: Andris Treimanis (Latvia)

== Nations League Finals ==
The four nations from Group A4 (Belgium, the Netherlands, Poland and Wales) bid to host the Nations League Finals. As the nation that qualified for the finals, the Netherlands was granted hosting rights. The semi-final pairings were determined by means of an open draw on 25 January 2023, 11:00 CET, at the UEFA headquarters in Nyon, Switzerland. For scheduling purposes, the host team was allocated to semi-final 1 as the administrative home team.

Times are CEST (UTC+2), as listed by UEFA.

=== Bracket ===
Semi-finals
14 June – Rotterdam
Netherlands	2
Croatia (a.e.t.)	4
15 June – Enschede
Spain	2
Italy	1

Final
18 June – Rotterdam
Croatia	0 (4)
Spain (p)	0 (5)
Third place play-off
18 June – Enschede
Netherlands	2
Italy	3

=== Semi-finals ===
14 June 2023
20:45

Netherlands	2–4 (a.e.t.)	Croatia
Malen 34'; Lang 90+6'	Report	Kramarić 55' (pen.); Pašalić 72'; Petković 98'; Modrić 116' (pen.)

De Kuip, Rotterdam
Attendance: 39,359
Referee: István Kovács (Romania)

15 June 2023
20:45

Spain	2–1	Italy
Pino 3'; Joselu 88'	Report	Immobile 11' (pen.)

De Grolsch Veste, Enschede
Attendance: 24,558
Referee: Slavko Vinčić (Slovenia)

=== Third-place play-off ===
18 June 2023
15:00

Netherlands	2–3	Italy
Bergwijn 68'; Wijnaldum 89'	Report	Dimarco 6'; Frattesi 20'; Chiesa 72'

De Grolsch Veste, Enschede
Attendance: 21,292
Referee: Glenn Nyberg (Sweden)

=== Final ===
18 June 2023
20:45

Croatia	0–0 (a.e.t.)	Spain
	Report
Penalties
Vlašić (penalty scored); Brozović (penalty scored); Modrić (penalty scored); Majer (penalty missed); Perišić (penalty scored); Petković (penalty missed)	4–5	(penalty scored) Joselu; (penalty scored) Rodri; (penalty scored) Merino; (penalty scored) Asensio; (penalty missed) Laporte; (penalty scored) Carvajal

De Kuip, Rotterdam
Attendance: 41,110
Referee: Felix Zwayer (Germany)

== Goalscorers ==
There were 140 goals scored in 52 matches, for an average of 2.69 goals per match.

3 goals

- (Belgium) Michy Batshuayi
- (Croatia) Luka Modrić
- (Netherlands) Steven Bergwijn
- (Netherlands) Memphis Depay

2 goals

- (Belgium) Kevin De Bruyne
- (Belgium) Leandro Trossard
- (Croatia) Andrej Kramarić
- (Croatia) Mario Pašalić
- (Czech Republic) Jan Kuchta
- (Denmark) Andreas Cornelius
- (Denmark) Andreas Skov Olsen
- (England) Harry Kane
- (France) Kylian Mbappé
- (Germany) İlkay Gündoğan
- (Germany) Kai Havertz
- (Germany) Jonas Hofmann
- (Germany) Joshua Kimmich
- (Germany) Timo Werner
- (Hungary) Zsolt Nagy
- (Hungary) Roland Sallai
- (Italy) Federico Dimarco
- (Italy) Lorenzo Pellegrini
- (Italy) Giacomo Raspadori
- (Netherlands) Denzel Dumfries
- (Netherlands) Cody Gakpo
- (Netherlands) Noa Lang
- (Poland) Karol Świderski
- (Portugal) João Cancelo
- (Portugal) Diogo Dalot
- (Portugal) Cristiano Ronaldo
- (Spain) Álvaro Morata
- (Spain) Pablo Sarabia
- (Switzerland) Breel Embolo
- (Wales) Brennan Johnson

1 goal

- (Austria) Marko Arnautović
- (Austria) Christoph Baumgartner
- (Austria) Michael Gregoritsch
- (Austria) Marcel Sabitzer
- (Austria) Xaver Schlager
- (Austria) Andreas Weimann
- (Belgium) Leander Dendoncker
- (Belgium) Loïs Openda
- (Belgium) Youri Tielemans
- (Belgium) Axel Witsel
- (Croatia) Marko Livaja
- (Croatia) Dejan Lovren
- (Croatia) Lovro Majer
- (Croatia) Bruno Petković
- (Croatia) Borna Sosa
- (Czech Republic) Jakub Pešek
- (Czech Republic) Patrik Schick
- (Denmark) Kasper Dolberg
- (Denmark) Christian Eriksen
- (Denmark) Pierre-Emile Højbjerg
- (Denmark) Jens Stryger Larsen
- (Denmark) Jonas Wind
- (England) Mason Mount
- (England) Luke Shaw
- (France) Karim Benzema
- (France) Olivier Giroud
- (France) Adrien Rabiot
- (Germany) Thomas Müller
- (Hungary) Dániel Gazdag
- (Hungary) Ádám Szalai
- (Hungary) Dominik Szoboszlai
- (Italy) Nicolò Barella
- (Italy) Alessandro Bastoni
- (Italy) Federico Chiesa
- (Italy) Davide Frattesi
- (Italy) Wilfried Gnonto
- (Italy) Ciro Immobile
- (Netherlands) Davy Klaassen
- (Netherlands) Teun Koopmeiners
- (Netherlands) Donyell Malen
- (Netherlands) Virgil van Dijk
- (Netherlands) Wout Weghorst
- (Netherlands) Georginio Wijnaldum
- (Poland) Matty Cash
- (Poland) Jakub Kamiński
- (Poland) Robert Lewandowski
- (Poland) Piotr Zieliński
- (Portugal) William Carvalho
- (Portugal) Bruno Fernandes
- (Portugal) Gonçalo Guedes
- (Portugal) Ricardo Horta
- (Portugal) Diogo Jota
- (Spain) Jordi Alba
- (Spain) Gavi
- (Spain) Joselu
- (Spain) Iñigo Martínez
- (Spain) Yeremy Pino
- (Spain) Carlos Soler
- (Switzerland) Manuel Akanji
- (Switzerland) Remo Freuler
- (Switzerland) Noah Okafor
- (Switzerland) Haris Seferovic
- (Wales) Gareth Bale
- (Wales) Kieffer Moore
- (Wales) Rhys Norrington-Davies
- (Wales) Jonny Williams

1 own goal

- (Italy) Gianluca Mancini (against Hungary)
- (Switzerland) Djibril Sow (against Czech Republic)

== Overall ranking ==
The 16 League A teams were ranked 1st to 16th overall in the 2022–23 UEFA Nations League according to the following rules:

- The teams finishing first in the groups were ranked 1st to 4th according to the results of the Nations League Finals.
- The teams finishing second in the groups were ranked 5th to 8th according to the results of the league phase.
- The teams finishing third in the groups were ranked 9th to 12th according to the results of the league phase.
- The teams finishing fourth in the groups were ranked 13th to 16th according to the results of the league phase.

Rnk	Grp	Team	Pld	W	D	L	GF	GA	GD	Pts
1	A2	Spain	6	3	2	1	8	5	+3	11
2	A1	Croatia	6	4	1	1	8	6	+2	13
3	A3	Italy	6	3	2	1	8	7	+1	11
4	A4	Netherlands	6	5	1	0	14	6	+8	16
5	A1	Denmark	6	4	0	2	9	5	+4	12
6	A2	Portugal	6	3	1	2	11	3	+8	10
7	A4	Belgium	6	3	1	2	11	8	+3	10
8	A3	Hungary	6	3	1	2	8	5	+3	10
9	A2	Switzerland	6	3	0	3	6	9	−3	9
10	A3	Germany	6	1	4	1	11	9	+2	7
11	A4	Poland	6	2	1	3	6	12	−6	7
12	A1	France	6	1	2	3	5	7	−2	5
13	A1	Austria	6	1	1	4	6	10	−4	4
14	A2	Czech Republic	6	1	1	4	5	13	−8	4
15	A3	England	6	0	3	3	4	10	−6	3
16	A4	Wales	6	0	1	5	6	11	−5	1

Source: UEFA
Rules for classification: Ranking criteria

== Euro 2024 qualifying play-offs ==
The four best teams in League A according to the overall ranking that failed to qualify for UEFA Euro 2024 through the qualifying group stage were set to compete against each other to win one extra qualification spot through the path A play-offs. As Poland and Wales were the only unqualified teams from League A, the first available slot for the teams participating in the Path A play-off was allocated to the best-ranked group winner of League D, Estonia, as they had not already qualified in the qualifying group stage. The remaining available slot was allocated to the best ranked un-qualified team from league B (excluding group winners of league B and teams previously chosen to participate in the path B play-offs), Finland.

League A
Rank	Team
1 ^{GW}	Spain
2 ^{GW}	Croatia
3 ^{GW}	Italy
4 ^{GW}	Netherlands
5	Denmark
6	Portugal
7	Belgium
8	Hungary
9	Switzerland
10	Germany ^{†}
11	Poland
12	France
13	Austria
14	Czech Republic
15	England
16	Wales

Key

- ^{GW} Group winner from Nations League A
- Team qualified directly to final tournament
- Team in **bold** advanced to play-offs
- † UEFA Euro 2024 host, qualified automatically

The path A play-offs were previously held similarly to decide one extra qualification spot for UEFA Euro 2020.
