= 2023 UEFA Nations League Finals =

Finaleronde UEFA Nations League 2023 (in Dutch)

Tournament details
- Host country: Netherlands
- Dates: 14–18 June
- Teams: 4
- Venues: 2 (in 2 host cities)

Final positions
- Champions: Spain (1st title)
- Runners-up: Croatia
- Third place: Italy
- Fourth place: Netherlands

Tournament statistics
- Matches played: 4
- Goals scored: 14 (3.5 per match)
- Attendance: 126,319 (31,580 per match)
- Top scorer(s): 14 players (1 goal each)
- Best player: (Spain) Rodri

The 2023 UEFA Nations League Finals was the final tournament of the 2022–23 edition of the UEFA Nations League, the third season of the international football competition involving the men's national teams of the 55 member associations of UEFA. The tournament was held from 14 to 18 June 2023 in the Netherlands and was contested by the four group winners of Nations League A. The tournament consisted of two semi-finals, a third place play-off and a final to determine the champions of the UEFA Nations League.

Following their win in 2021, defending champions France were unable to retain their title after finishing third in their group. Spain won the final against Croatia, 5–4 on penalties following a 0–0 draw after extra time, for their first UEFA Nations League title.

== Format ==
The Nations League Finals took place in June 2023, and were contested by the four group winners of League A. The four teams were drawn into a five-team group (rather than a six-team group) for the UEFA Euro 2024 qualifying group stage, thereby leaving the June 2023 window available for the Nations League Finals.

The Nations League Finals took place over five days and were played in single-leg knockout matches, consisting of two semi-finals on 14 and 15 June (the first of which featured the host team), and a third place play-off and final three days after the second semi-final on 18 June 2023. The semi-final pairings were determined by means of an open draw. All matches in the tournament utilised goal-line technology and video assistant referee (VAR) systems.

In the Nations League Finals, if the scores were level at the end of normal time:

- In the semi-finals and final, 30 minutes of extra time would be played. If the score was still level after extra time, the winner would be determined by a penalty shoot-out.
- In the third place play-off, extra time would not be played, and the winner would be determined by a penalty shoot-out.

== Qualified teams ==
The four group winners of League A qualified for the Nations League Finals.

Group	Winners	Date of qualification	Previous UNL Finals appearances	Previous best UNL performance	UNL Rankings September 2022	FIFA Rankings April 2023
A1	Croatia	25 September 2022	0 (debut)	Ninth place (2018–19)	2	7
A2	Spain	27 September 2022	1 (2021)	Runners-up (2020–21)	3	10
A3	Italy	26 September 2022	1 (2021)	Third place (2020–21)	4	8
A4	Netherlands (host)	25 September 2022	1 (2019)	Runners-up (2018–19)	1	6

== Host selection ==
The Netherlands was confirmed as the host country by the UEFA Executive Committee during their meeting on 29 November 2022. Only League A teams could bid for the Nations League Finals, and only one of the four finals participants would ultimately be selected as hosts. UEFA required the tournament to be played at two Category 4 stadiums, each with at least 30,000 net seating capacity. The stadiums ideally would be located in the same host city or up to approximately 150 kilometres (93 mi) apart. UEFA envisioned the larger of the stadiums to host the first semi-final (featuring the host team) and the final. The bidding timeline was as follows:

- 28 February 2022: Applications formally invited
- 13 April 2022, 16:00 CEST: Closing date for registering intention to bid (non-binding)
- 14 April 2022: Bid requirements made available to bidders
- May 2022: Opening workshop for bidders
- July/August 2022: Technical calls with bidders
- 7 September 2022, 16:00 CEST: Closing date for submission of preliminary bid dossier
- 5 October 2022, 16:00 CEST: Closing date for submission of final bid dossier
- 29 November 2022: Host appointment by the UEFA Executive Committee

On 13 April 2022, UEFA announced that Belgium, the Netherlands, Poland and Wales had declared interest in hosting the tournament. As all four associations were in Group A4, the group winner was in line to be appointed as the host, provided that the associations submitted bids which meet UEFA's requirements. Poland and Wales were unable to win Group A4 following their results on 14 June 2022, leaving Belgium and the Netherlands as the remaining potential hosts. On 25 September 2022, the Netherlands won Group A4 over Belgium and advanced to the Nations League Finals, thereby automatically winning hosting rights, which were confirmed by the UEFA Executive Committee on 29 November 2022.

== Venues ==
De Kuip in Rotterdam and De Grolsch Veste in Enschede were confirmed as the venues for the tournament on 29 November 2022. Other potential stadiums, such as the Johan Cruyff Arena in Amsterdam (the largest in the country) and the Philips Stadion in Eindhoven, were both unavailable for the tournament due to previously scheduled concerts.

Rotterdam	2023 UEFA Nations League Finals is located in Netherlands	Enschede
De Kuip	2023 UEFA Nations League Finals is located in Netherlands	De Grolsch Veste
Capacity: 51,117	2023 UEFA Nations League Finals is located in Netherlands	Capacity: 30,205

== Draw ==
The semi-final pairings were determined by means of an open draw on 25 January 2023, 11:00 CET, at the UEFA headquarters in Nyon, Switzerland. Former Dutch international Wesley Sneijder, ambassador for the Nations League Finals, drew the match pairings. The first two teams drawn were allocated to match pairing A, while the remaining two teams drawn were allocated to match pairing B. For scheduling purposes, the host team was allocated to the first semi-final as the administrative home team. The administrative home team for both the third place play-off and final were predetermined as the teams which advanced from semi-final 1.

== Squads ==
Each national team had to submit a squad of 23 players, three of whom had to be goalkeepers, at least ten days before the opening match of the tournament. If a player became injured or ill severely enough to prevent his participation in the tournament before his team's first match, he could be replaced by another player.

== Bracket ==
Semi-finals
14 June – Rotterdam
Netherlands	2
Croatia (a.e.t.)	4
15 June – Enschede
Spain	2
Italy	1

Final
18 June – Rotterdam
Croatia	0 (4)
Spain (p)	0 (5)
Third place play-off
18 June – Enschede
Netherlands	2
Italy	3

All times are local, CEST (UTC+2).

== Semi-finals ==
=== Netherlands vs Croatia ===
14 June 2023
20:45

Netherlands	2–4 (a.e.t.)	Croatia
Malen 34'; Lang 90+6'	Report	Kramarić 55' (pen.); Pašalić 72'; Petković 98'; Modrić 116' (pen.)

De Kuip, Rotterdam
Attendance: 39,359
Referee: István Kovács (Romania)

Netherlands	Croatia

GK	1	Justin Bijlow
RB	22	Denzel Dumfries		(substituted off) 85'
CB	12	Lutsharel Geertruida
CB	4	Virgil van Dijk (c)
LB	5	Nathan Aké		(substituted off) 106'
CM	6	Mats Wieffer		(substituted off) 75'
CM	20	Teun Koopmeiners	(yellow card) 93'
CM	21	Frenkie de Jong	(yellow card) 38'
RF	18	Donyell Malen		(substituted off) 75'
CF	9	Cody Gakpo		(substituted off) 106'
LF	11	Xavi Simons		(substituted off) 64'
Substitutions:
FW	19	Wout Weghorst		(substituted on) 64'
MF	8	Georginio Wijnaldum		(substituted on) 75'
FW	7	Steven Bergwijn		(substituted on) 75'
FW	10	Noa Lang		(substituted on) 85'
MF	15	Marten de Roon		(substituted on) 106'
DF	16	Tyrell Malacia	(yellow card) 116'	(substituted on) 106'
Manager:
Ronald Koeman

GK	1	Dominik Livaković	(yellow card) 90+1'
RB	22	Josip Juranović		(substituted off) 78'
CB	6	Josip Šutalo		(substituted off) 91'
CB	21	Domagoj Vida
LB	14	Ivan Perišić
DM	11	Marcelo Brozović	(yellow card) 64'
CM	10	Luka Modrić (c)		(substituted off) 119'
CM	8	Mateo Kovačić	(yellow card) 17'	(substituted off) 85'
RW	15	Mario Pašalić	(yellow card) 24'
LW	16	Luka Ivanušec		(substituted off) 78'
CF	9	Andrej Kramarić		(substituted off) 90'
Substitutions:
MF	13	Nikola Vlašić		(substituted on) 78'
DF	2	Josip Stanišić		(substituted on) 78'
MF	7	Lovro Majer		(substituted on) 85'
DF	5	Martin Erlić		(substituted on) 90'
FW	17	Bruno Petković		(substituted on) 91'
DF	3	Borna Barišić		(substituted on) 119'
Manager:
Zlatko Dalić

Man of the Match:
Luka Modrić (Croatia)

Assistant referees:
Vasile Marinescu (Romania)
Ovidiu Artene (Romania)
Fourth official:
Halil Umut Meler (Turkey)
Video assistant referee:
Bastian Dankert (Germany)
Assistant video assistant referee:
Sören Storks (Germany)

=== Spain vs Italy ===
15 June 2023
20:45

Spain	2–1	Italy
Pino 3'; Joselu 88'	Report	Immobile 11' (pen.)

De Grolsch Veste, Enschede
Attendance: 24,558
Referee: Slavko Vinčić (Slovenia)

Spain	Italy

GK	23	Unai Simón
RB	22	Jesús Navas
CB	3	Robin Le Normand
CB	14	Aymeric Laporte
LB	18	Jordi Alba (c)	(yellow card) 45+1'
CM	16	Rodri
CM	6	Mikel Merino		(substituted off) 74'
RW	19	Rodrigo		(substituted off) 46'
AM	9	Gavi	(yellow card) 57'	(substituted off) 68'
LW	15	Yéremy Pino		(substituted off) 74'
CF	7	Álvaro Morata	(yellow card) 83'	(substituted off) 84'
Substitutions:
FW	10	Marco Asensio		(substituted on) 46'
MF	11	Sergio Canales		(substituted on) 68'
MF	8	Fabián Ruiz		(substituted on) 74'
FW	12	Ansu Fati		(substituted on) 74'
FW	20	Joselu		(substituted on) 84'
Manager:
Luis de la Fuente

GK	1	Gianluigi Donnarumma
CB	13	Rafael Tolói
CB	19	Leonardo Bonucci (c)		(substituted off) 46'
CB	15	Francesco Acerbi
RM	2	Giovanni Di Lorenzo
CM	7	Davide Frattesi		(substituted off) 76'
CM	8	Jorginho		(substituted off) 60'
CM	18	Nicolò Barella
LM	4	Leonardo Spinazzola		(substituted off) 46'
CF	11	Nicolò Zaniolo	(yellow card) 90+3'
CF	17	Ciro Immobile	(yellow card) 38'	(substituted off) 60'
Substitutions:
DF	5	Matteo Darmian		(substituted on) 46'
DF	3	Federico Dimarco		(substituted on) 46'
FW	14	Federico Chiesa		(substituted on) 60'
MF	16	Bryan Cristante		(substituted on) 60'
MF	6	Marco Verratti		(substituted on) 76'
Manager:
Roberto Mancini

Man of the Match:
Rodri (Spain)

Assistant referees:
Tomaž Klančnik (Slovenia)
Andraž Kovačič (Slovenia)
Fourth official:
Irfan Peljto (Bosnia and Herzegovina)
Video assistant referee:
Nejc Kajtazović (Slovenia)
Assistant video assistant referee:
Matej Jug (Slovenia)

== Third place play-off ==
18 June 2023
15:00

Netherlands	2–3	Italy
Bergwijn 68'; Wijnaldum 89'	Report	Dimarco 6'; Frattesi 20'; Chiesa 72'

De Grolsch Veste, Enschede
Attendance: 21,292
Referee: Glenn Nyberg (Sweden)

Netherlands	Italy

GK	1	Justin Bijlow
RB	22	Denzel Dumfries
CB	12	Lutsharel Geertruida		(substituted off) 46'
CB	4	Virgil van Dijk (c)
LB	5	Nathan Aké
CM	6	Mats Wieffer		(substituted off) 76'
CM	21	Frenkie de Jong
CM	11	Xavi Simons		(substituted off) 63'
RF	18	Donyell Malen		(substituted off) 46'
CF	9	Cody Gakpo
LF	10	Noa Lang		(substituted off) 46'
Substitutions:
FW	7	Steven Bergwijn		(substituted on) 46'
MF	8	Georginio Wijnaldum		(substituted on) 46'
FW	19	Wout Weghorst	(yellow card) 90+5'	(substituted on) 46'
MF	20	Teun Koopmeiners		(substituted on) 63'
MF	17	Joey Veerman		(substituted on) 76'
Manager:
Ronald Koeman

GK	1	Gianluigi Donnarumma (c)
RB	13	Rafael Tolói
CB	15	Francesco Acerbi	(yellow card) 90+5'
CB	23	Alessandro Buongiorno
LB	3	Federico Dimarco	(yellow card) 34'	(substituted off) 74'
CM	7	Davide Frattesi
CM	16	Bryan Cristante
CM	6	Marco Verratti		(substituted off) 85'
RF	20	Wilfried Gnonto		(substituted off) 63'
CF	9	Mateo Retegui		(substituted off) 85'
LF	22	Giacomo Raspadori		(substituted off) 63'
Substitutions:
FW	14	Federico Chiesa		(substituted on) 63'
MF	11	Nicolò Zaniolo		(substituted on) 63'
DF	4	Leonardo Spinazzola		(substituted on) 74'
MF	18	Nicolò Barella	(yellow card) 90+2'	(substituted on) 85'
MF	10	Lorenzo Pellegrini		(substituted on) 85'
Manager:
Roberto Mancini

Man of the Match:
Federico Dimarco (Italy)

Assistant referees:
Mahbod Beigi (Sweden)
Andreas Söderqvist (Sweden)
Fourth official:
Kristo Tohver (Estonia)
Video assistant referee:
Bartosz Frankowski (Poland)
Assistant video assistant referee:
Paweł Pskit (Poland)

== Final ==
18 June 2023
20:45

Croatia	0–0 (a.e.t.)	Spain
	Report
Penalties
Vlašić (penalty scored); Brozović (penalty scored); Modrić (penalty scored); Majer (penalty missed); Perišić (penalty scored); Petković (penalty missed)	4–5	(penalty scored) Joselu; (penalty scored) Rodri; (penalty scored) Merino; (penalty scored) Asensio; (penalty missed) Laporte; (penalty scored) Carvajal

De Kuip, Rotterdam
Attendance: 41,110
Referee: Felix Zwayer (Germany)

Croatia	Spain

GK	1	Dominik Livaković
RB	22	Josip Juranović		(substituted off) 112'
CB	6	Josip Šutalo
CB	5	Martin Erlić
LB	14	Ivan Perišić
DM	11	Marcelo Brozović
CM	10	Luka Modrić (c)
CM	8	Mateo Kovačić
RW	15	Mario Pašalić		(substituted off) 61'
LW	16	Luka Ivanušec		(substituted off) 78'
CF	9	Andrej Kramarić		(substituted off) 90+1'
Substitutions:
FW	17	Bruno Petković	(yellow card) 90+2'	(substituted on) 61'
MF	13	Nikola Vlašić		(substituted on) 78'
MF	7	Lovro Majer		(substituted on) 90+1'
DF	2	Josip Stanišić		(substituted on) 112'
Manager:
Zlatko Dalić

GK	23	Unai Simón
RB	22	Jesús Navas		(substituted off) 97'
CB	3	Robin Le Normand		(substituted off) 78'
CB	14	Aymeric Laporte
LB	18	Jordi Alba (c)
CM	16	Rodri	(yellow card) 97'
CM	8	Fabián Ruiz		(substituted off) 78'
RW	10	Marco Asensio
AM	9	Gavi	(yellow card) 81'	(substituted off) 87'
LW	15	Yeremy Pino		(substituted off) 66'
CF	7	Álvaro Morata		(substituted off) 66'
Substitutions:
FW	12	Ansu Fati		(substituted on) 66'
FW	20	Joselu		(substituted on) 66'
MF	6	Mikel Merino		(substituted on) 78'
DF	4	Nacho	(yellow card) 96'	(substituted on) 78'
FW	21	Dani Olmo		(substituted on) 87'
DF	2	Dani Carvajal		(substituted on) 97'
Manager:
Luis de la Fuente

Man of the Match:
Marcelo Brozović (Croatia)

Assistant referees:
Stefan Lupp (Germany)
Marco Achmüller (Germany)
Fourth official:
Ivan Kružliak (Slovakia)
Video assistant referee:
Marco Fritz (Germany)
Assistant video assistant referees:
Sven Jablonski (Germany)
Stuart Attwell (England)

== Statistics ==
=== Goalscorers ===
There were 14 goals scored in 4 matches, for an average of 3.5 goals per match.

1 goal

- (Croatia national football team) Andrej Kramarić
- (Croatia national football team) Luka Modrić
- (Croatia national football team) Mario Pašalić
- (Croatia national football team) Bruno Petković
- (Italy national football team) Federico Chiesa
- (Italy national football team) Federico Dimarco
- (Italy national football team) Davide Frattesi
- (Italy national football team) Ciro Immobile
- (Netherlands national football team) Steven Bergwijn
- (Netherlands national football team) Noa Lang
- (Netherlands national football team) Donyell Malen
- (Netherlands national football team) Georginio Wijnaldum
- (Spain national football team) Joselu
- (Spain national football team) Yéremy Pino

=== Assists ===
1 assist

- (Croatia) Luka Ivanušec
- (Croatia) Josip Juranović
- (Netherlands) Mats Wieffer
- (Netherlands) Joey Veerman
- (Italy) Davide Frattesi
- (Italy) Bryan Cristante
- (Spain) Rodri

Source: UEFA

=== Awards ===
Player of the Tournament

The Player of the Finals award was given to Rodri, who was chosen by UEFA's technical observers.

- (Spain) Rodri

Goal of the Tournament

The Alipay Goal of the Tournament was decided by online voting. A total of four goals were in the shortlist, chosen by UEFA's technical observers: Federico Dimarco (against Netherlands), Donyell Malen (against Croatia), Mario Pašalić (against Netherlands) and Bruno Petković (against Netherlands). Petković won the award for his goal in the semi-final.

Rank	Goalscorer	Opponent	Score	Result	Round
1st place, gold medalist(s)	(Croatia) Bruno Petković	Netherlands	3–2	4–2 (a.e.t.)	Semi-finals
—	(Italy) Federico Dimarco	Netherlands	1–0	3–2	Third place play-off
—	(Netherlands) Donyell Malen	Croatia	1–0	2–4 (a.e.t.)	Semi-finals
—	(Croatia) Mario Pašalić	Netherlands	2–1	4–2 (a.e.t.)	Semi-finals

=== Discipline ===
A player would have been automatically suspended for the next match for receiving a red card, which could have been extended for serious offences. However, no players received a suspension during the Nations League Finals. Yellow card suspensions did not apply in the Nations League Finals, including any pending suspensions from the league phase, while yellow cards issued were not carried forward to any other future international matches.
