= Dani Carvajal =

Spanish footballer (born 1992)

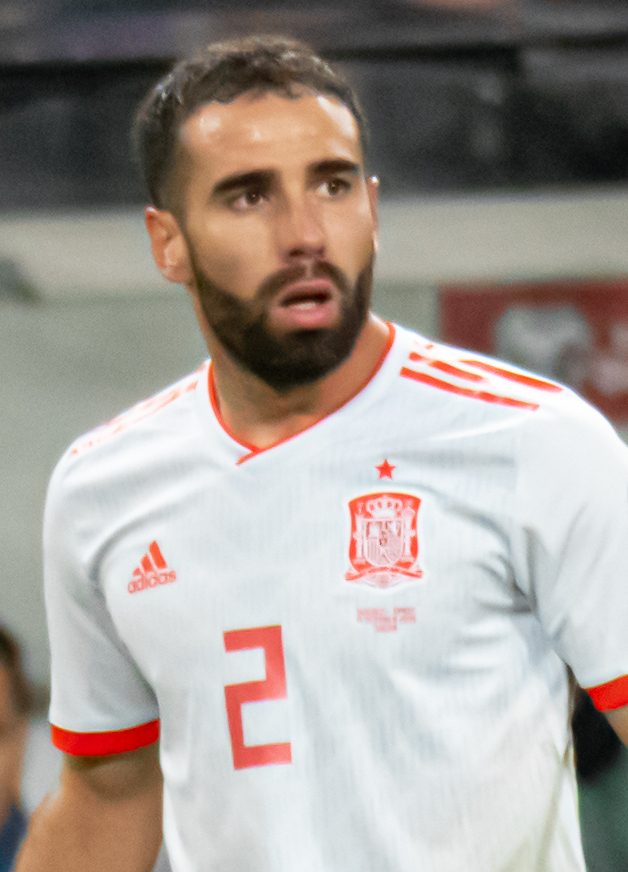
- Carvajal playing for Spain in 2019

Personal information
- Full name: Daniel Carvajal Ramos
- Date of birth: 11 January 1992 (age 34)
- Place of birth: Leganés, Spain
- Height: 1.73 m (5 ft 8 in)
- Position: Right-back

Team information
- Current team: Getafe
- Number: 14

Youth career
- 1999–2002: ADCR Leman's
- 2002–2010: Real Madrid

Senior career*
Years	Team	Apps	(Gls)
2010–2012	Real Madrid B	68	(3)
2012–2013	Bayer Leverkusen	32	(1)
2013–2026	Real Madrid	303	(10)
2026–	Getafe	3	(0)

International career^{‡}
2010–2011	Spain U19	11	(0)
2012–2014	Spain U21	10	(1)
2014–2025	Spain	52	(1)
Medal record
Men's football
Representing Spain
UEFA European Championship
Winner	2024 Germany
UEFA Nations League
Winner	2023 Netherlands
UEFA European Under-21 Championship
Winner	2013 Israel
UEFA European Under-19 Championship
Winner	2011 Romania
- * Club domestic league appearances and goals as of 18:56, 1 November 2026 (UTC) ‡ National team caps and goals as of 07:46, 5 September 2025 (UTC)

Daniel Carvajal Ramos (Spanish pronunciation: [daˈnjel kaɾβaˈxal ˈramos]; born 11 January 1992) is a Spanish professional footballer who plays as a right-back for La Liga club Getafe and the Spain national team. He is widely regarded as one of the greatest right-backs of his generation.

Having risen through the Real Madrid youth ranks, Carvajal spent a season with Bayer Leverkusen before returning to Real Madrid. He joined the first team in 2013 and has since won 27 major trophies at Real Madrid including four La Liga titles, two Copa del Rey titles and a joint record six Champions League wins, a record he shares with Paco Gento, Luka Modrić, Toni Kroos and Nacho.

At the youth international level, Carvajal won the 2011 European Championship with the under-19 team and the 2013 edition with the under-21 team. He made his senior debut in 2014, representing the nation at the FIFA World Cup in 2018 and 2022. In 2024, he was part of the Spain squad that won the UEFA European Championship. Carvajal also scored the decisive penalty at the 2023 UEFA Nations League Finals, securing Spain's first UEFA Nations League title.

== Club career ==
=== Real Madrid Castilla ===
Carvajal was born in Leganés, a suburb of Madrid. He joined Real Madrid's youth system as a 10-year-old, and continued climbing through the ranks until reaching Real Madrid Castilla in 2010.

In his first season as a senior, Carvajal was immediately cast in the reserve team's starting XI, also being the team's captain. In the following campaign, he fared even better (38 games and two goals, playoffs included), as the Bs returned to Segunda División after a five-year absence.

=== Bayer Leverkusen ===
On 11 July 2012, after failing to make a single appearance for Real's first team, Carvajal signed a five-year contract with Germany's Bayer Leverkusen for a transfer fee of €5 million. The Spaniards added on a buy-back clause in the region of €6.5 million if they wanted to re-sign the player after one season, €7 million after two and approximately €8.5 million after three.

Carvajal made his Bundesliga debut on 1 September 2012 in a 2–0 home win against SC Freiburg, being subsequently named to the Team of the Week. He scored his first goal for his new club on 25 November, netting the second in an eventual 2–1 success at TSG Hoffenheim.

Carvajal was selected as one of the three best right backs at the end of his first and only season, behind Bayern Munich's Phillip Lahm and Schalke 04's Atsuto Uchida. He received 16% of the total vote from the fans.

=== Real Madrid ===
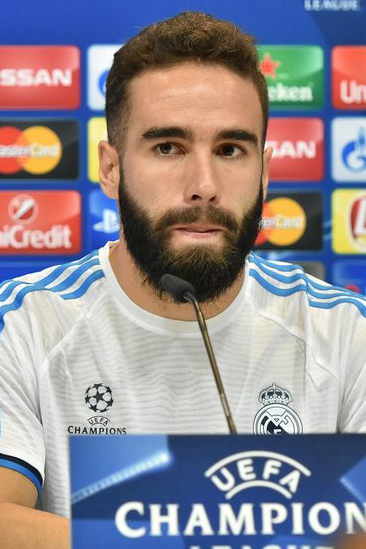
Carvajal with Real Madrid in 2015

On 3 June 2013, Real Madrid exercised their buy-back option on Carvajal, who became the team's first signing for 2013–14 for a fee believed to be in the region of €6.5 million. This was confirmed by Bayer's director of football Rudi Völler, who stated: "Real Madrid noticed the outstanding performances by Dani this season, and it was only a matter of time before they exercised their buy-back option." Shortly after the move, he spoke of his happiness to return, thanking the president, the fans and the club at a press conference.

Carvajal made his La Liga debut on 18 August 2013, in a 2–1 home win against Real Betis. One month later he played his first match in the UEFA Champions League, again featuring the full 90 minutes in a 6–1 away victory of Galatasaray in the group stage.

Carvajal appeared in 45 matches in his first season and scored twice, in the league against Rayo Vallecano and Osasuna. He added 120 minutes in the Champions League final, a 4–1 triumph over Atlético Madrid.

Carvajal started in Real Madrid's triumphs in the 2014 UEFA Super Cup over compatriots Sevilla, and in that year's FIFA Club World Cup final against Argentina's San Lorenzo de Almagro. In the first leg of the Champions League's semi-finals, on 5 May 2015, he conceded a penalty by fouling Carlos Tevez, with the Juventus forward converting the spot-kick to defeat the Spaniards 2–1.

On 8 July 2015, Carvajal signed a new deal with the Merengues until 2020. He contributed with eight appearances and one goal against Shakhtar Donetsk, in the campaign's Champions League, as the tournament ended in win; in the final against Atlético Madrid, he was subbed off injured early into the second half of a 1–1 draw (penalty shootout triumph).

On 9 August 2016, Carvajal started in the UEFA Super Cup clash against Sevilla in Trondheim, and scored the final 3–2 in the 119th minute after an individual effort. During the league season, in spite of several physical ailments, he still contributed with 23 games to help the team be crowned champions. On 3 December 2016, after Sergio Ramos had equalised in the last minute against Barcelona at the Camp Nou, he celebrated the goal by giving opposing fans the middle finger, but later apologised; after nearly one month on the sidelines, he returned to action just in time to start at the Champions League final on 3 June, which they won for the third time in four years.

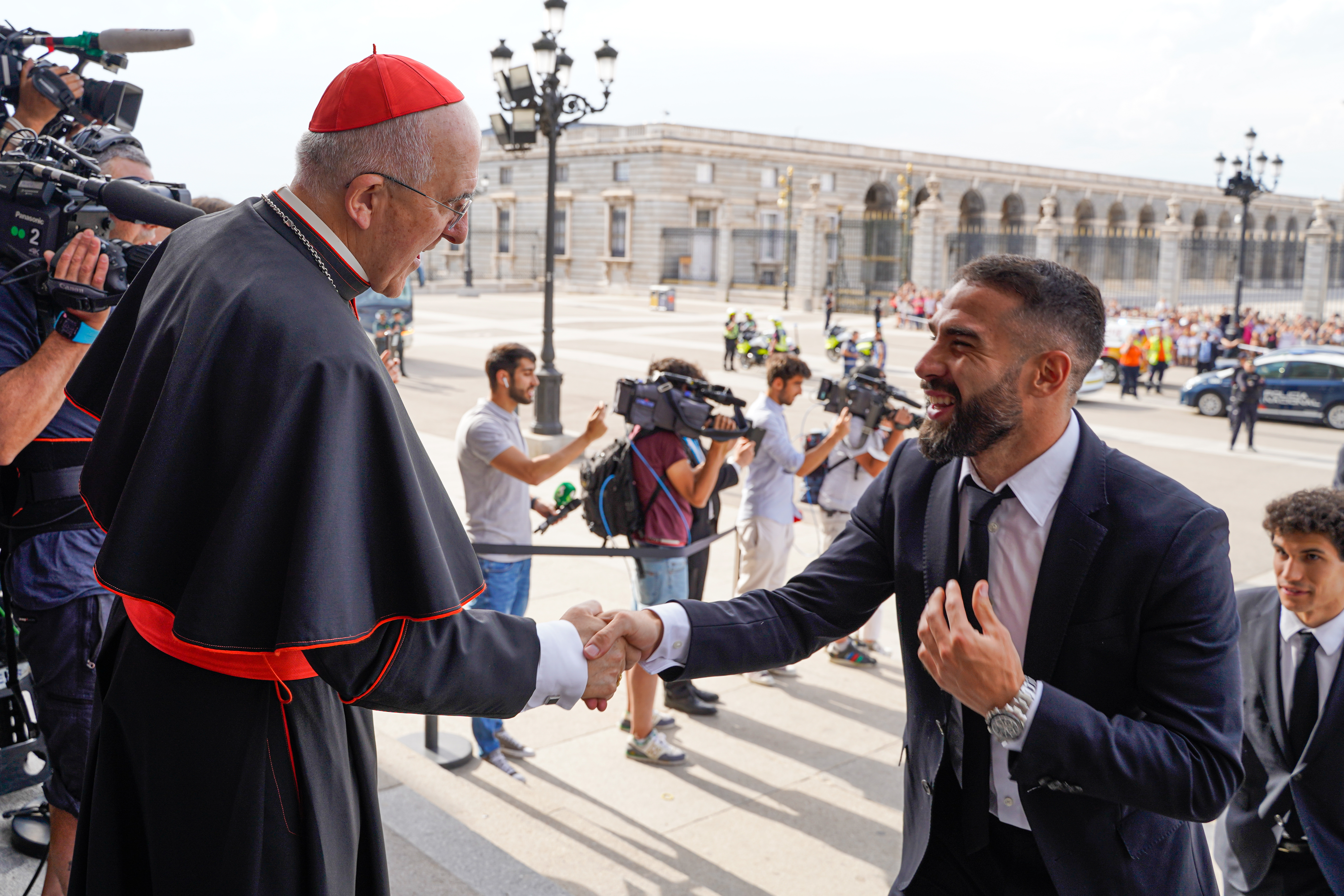
Carvajal in a trophy presentation ceremony at Virgin of Almudena in 2022

On 17 September 2017, Carvajal's contract was extended until 2022. Early in the following month, he was sidelined with a heart condition; he made eight appearances during that year's Champions League, and Madrid won their third consecutive and 13th overall title in the competition. In the decisive match against Liverpool he was forced to leave the pitch due to an injury, in an eventual 3–1 win at the Olympic Stadium in Kyiv.

Carvajal scored Real Madrid's first league goal of the new season on 19 August 2018, in a 2–0 home victory over Getafe.

The next season, Carvajal was a regular starter as Real Madrid won the 2019–20 La Liga. On 29 July 2021, he extended his contract until June 2025.

On 1 June 2024, he scored his second Champions League goal from a header in a 2–0 victory over Borussia Dortmund in the final. He also became the first player to win six finals in the competition along with Luka Modrić.

During the 2024–25 season, with the departure of Nacho, Carvajal was promoted as vice-captain of the team. On 5 October 2024, Carvajal suffered a torn Anterior cruciate ligament (ACL) along with lateral collateral ligament (LCL) and posterolateral corner injuries to his right knee during Real's match against Villarreal, he was ruled out for the rest of the season, with a recovery period estimated to be eight to ten months. A day after the injury, his contract was extended until 2026.

On 9 July 2025, Carvajal made his return to action, coming on as a substitute against Paris Saint-Germain in the semi-final of the 2025 FIFA Club World Cup. During the 2025–26 season, Carvajal became captain of the team following the departure of Luka Modrić.

On 18 May 2026, Carvajal announced that he would leave Real Madrid at the end of the 2025–26 season, after 13 years and more than 400 matches in the club.

=== Getafe ===
On 13 October 2026, Carvajal signed for La Liga club Getafe on a contract until 30 June 2027.

== International career ==
=== Youth ===
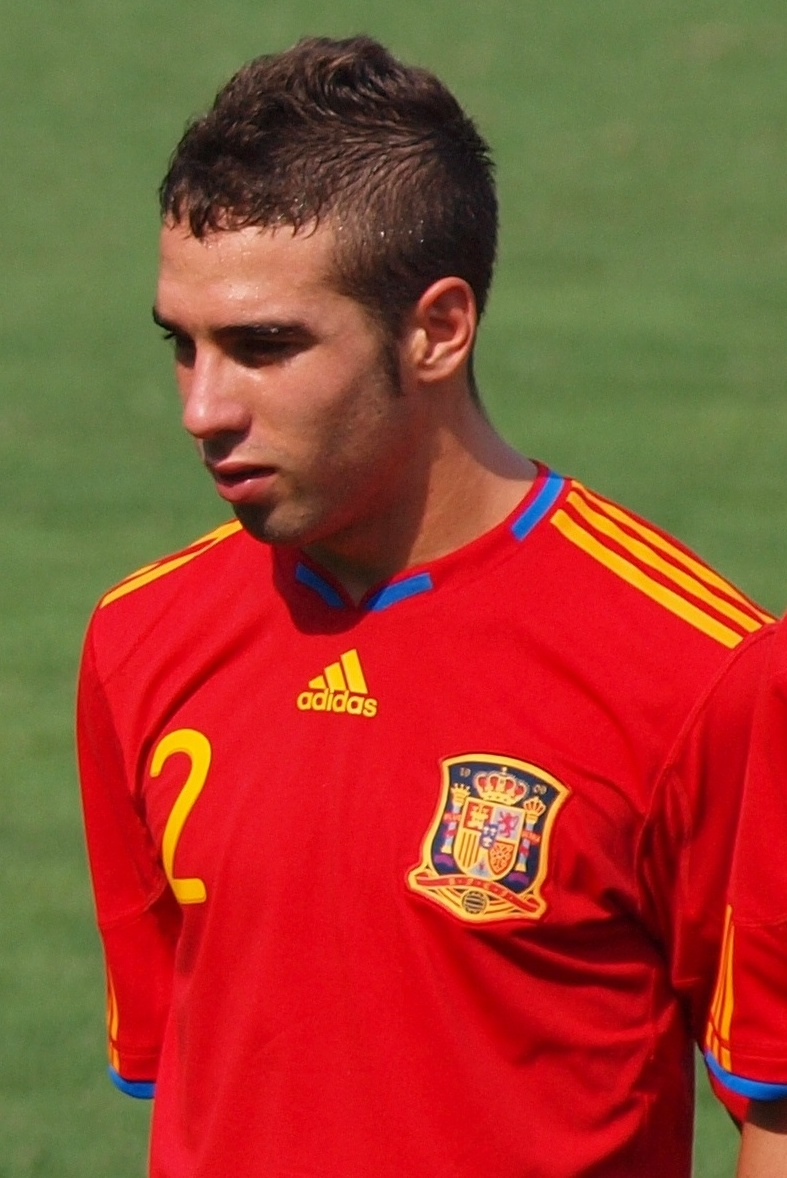
Carvajal with Spain under-19 in 2010

Carvajal acted as backup to FC Barcelona's Martín Montoya at the 2013 UEFA European Under-21 Championship, playing in the 3–0 group stage win against the Netherlands as Spain went on to win the tournament. He was selected by full side manager Vicente del Bosque for his 30-man provisional squad for the 2014 FIFA World Cup, being excused alongside all other Real Madrid and Atlético Madrid players from the warm-up game against Bolivia on 30 May due to the Champions League final, and being omitted from the final list the following day.

=== Senior ===
On 29 August 2014, Carvajal received his first call-up to the Spanish senior squad for friendly matches against France and Macedonia. He debuted on 4 September in a 0–1 friendly loss to the former in which he played the full 90 minutes. In May 2016, Carvajal was selected in the Spain squad for UEFA Euro 2016. However, on 30 May, he withdrew from the squad with a hamstring injury.

Carvajal was named in Spain's final squad for the 2018 FIFA World Cup. After sitting out the first game against Portugal as he was not fully fit, he made his first appearance in the competition on 20 June and played the entire 1–0 win over Iran. He retained his place in the starting line-up for the final Group B fixture against Morocco, assisting Iago Aspas' stoppage time equaliser in the 2–2 draw. In the round of 16 loss to Russia, Carvajal appeared as a 70th-minute substitute for Nacho Fernández.

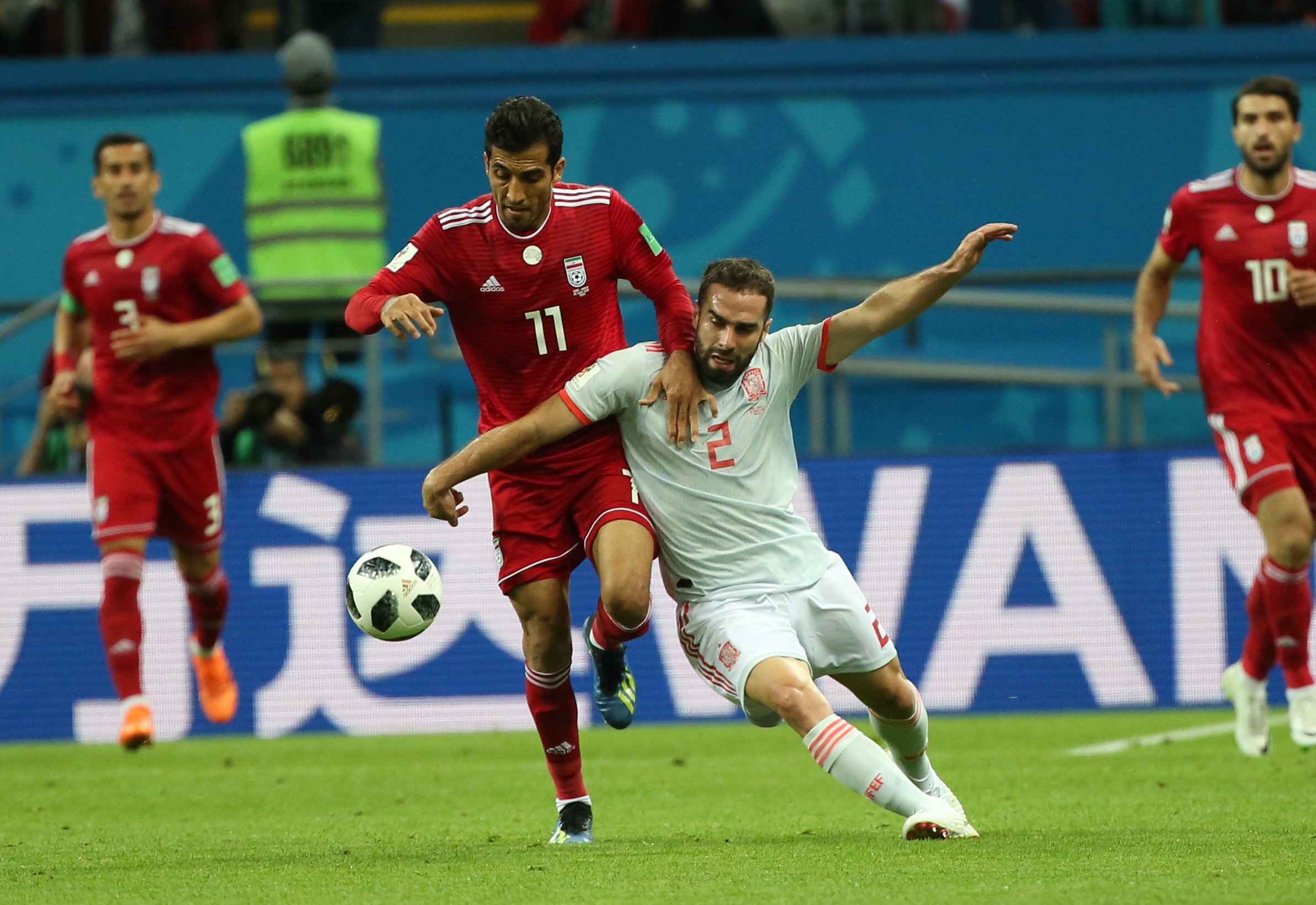
Carvajal (white) with Spain at the 2018 World Cup

He once again missed out on the European Championships three years later, with manager Luis Enrique leaving him out of the Spain's UEFA Euro 2020 squad due to injury. Spain went on to reach the semi-finals of the tournament, losing out to eventual champions Italy on penalties.

Carvajal was included in Spain's squad for the 2022 FIFA World Cup in Qatar, playing the full match against Germany and the second half against Japan during the group stage, as the team was again knocked out at the round of 16 in a penalty shootout against Morocco.

Carvajal played for Spain in the 2023 UEFA Nations League Finals, scoring the winning penalty via panenka in the final shoot-out against Croatia, following a goalless draw.

In 2024, he was named to the squad for the UEFA Euro 2024. On 15 June 2024, Carvajal scored his first international goal against Croatia in a 3–0 win in Spain's opening match at the European Championships. At the age of 32 years and 156 days, he became the oldest player to score for Spain at the UEFA European Championship. In the quarter-finals against hosts Germany, he was sent-off for a double booking late into extra-time for preventing a counter-attack, ruling him out of the next match; Spain won 2–1 to go through to the semi-finals. He later featured in the 2–1 victory over England in the final, achieving the tournament's title with his country.

Carvajal was omitted from Spain's squad for the 2026 FIFA World Cup by manager Luis de la Fuente due to injury struggles and lack of game time throughout the 2025–26 season, which affected his form.

== Style of play ==
Carvajal is known for his consistency, aggressive style, and his ability to assist his team both in defence and attack. A tenacious and tactically intelligent player, defensively he is known for his positioning, mentality, tackling, anticipation, and ability to intercept loose balls. Going forward, he also possesses excellent technical skills and crossing, as well as an ability to get forward with his overlapping runs due to this awareness. In terms of his physical qualities, he also stands out for his speed, energy, and work-rate, despite his diminutive stature. He is also highly regarded for his leadership qualities. Despite his ability, he has often struggled with injuries throughout his career. Brazilian former right-back Cafu described Carvajal as one of the best right-backs in the world in 2018.

== Personal life ==
Carvajal is married to Daphne Cañizares, with whom he has a child. His wife's twin sister Melanie is married to Carvajal's former Madrid teammate Joselu. His father is an inspector in the National Police.

On 8 April 2026, Carvajal was put under investigation by a judge in Andorra for allegations of illegal watch smuggling.

== Career statistics ==
=== Club ===
As of match played 1 November 2026

Appearances and goals by club, season and competition
Club	Season	League			National cup (Note: Includes DFB-Pokal, Copa del Rey)		Europe		Other		Total	
Club	Season	Division	Apps	Goals	Apps	Goals	Apps	Goals	Apps	Goals	Apps	Goals
Real Madrid Castilla	2010–11	Segunda División	30	1	—		—		0	0	30	1
Real Madrid Castilla	2011–12	Segunda División	38	2	—		—		0	0	38	2
Real Madrid Castilla	Total		68	3	—		—		0	0	68	3
Bayer Leverkusen	2012–13	Bundesliga	32	1	2	0	2 (Note: Appearances in UEFA Europa League)	0	—		36	1
Real Madrid	2013–14	La Liga	31	2	4	0	10 (Note: Appearances in UEFA Champions League)	0	—		45	2
Real Madrid	2014–15	La Liga	30	0	3	0	5	0	5 (Note: One appearance in UEFA Super Cup, two appearances in Supercopa de España, two appearances in FIFA Club World Cup)	0	43	0
Real Madrid	2015–16	La Liga	22	0	0	0	8	1	—		30	1
Real Madrid	2016–17	La Liga	23	0	4	0	11	0	3 (Note: One appearance and one goal in UEFA Super Cup, two appearances in FIFA Club World Cup)	1	41	1
Real Madrid	2017–18	La Liga	25	0	4	0	8	0	4 (Note: One appearance in UEFA Super Cup, two appearances in Supercopa de España , one appearance in FIFA Club World Cup)	0	41	0
Real Madrid	2018–19	La Liga	24	1	4	0	6	0	3 (Note: One appearance in UEFA Super Cup, two appearances in FIFA Club World Cup)	0	37	1
Real Madrid	2019–20	La Liga	31	1	2	0	7	0	2 (Note: Appearance(s) in Supercopa de España)	0	42	1
Real Madrid	2020–21	La Liga	13	0	0	0	2	0	0	0	15	0
Real Madrid	2021–22	La Liga	24	1	0	0	11	0	1	0	36	1
Real Madrid	2022–23	La Liga	27	0	3	0	11	0	4	0	45	0
Real Madrid	2023–24	La Liga	28	4	1	0	10	1	2	1	41	6
Real Madrid	2024–25	La Liga	8	1	0	0	2	0	2 (Note: One appearance in UEFA Super Cup, one appearance in FIFA Club World Cup)	0	12	1
Real Madrid	2025–26	La Liga	17	0	1	0	5	0	0	0	23	0
Real Madrid	Total		303	10	26	0	96	2	26	2	451	14
Getafe	2026–27	La Liga	3	0	0	0	0	0	—		3	0
Career total			406	14	28	0	98	2	26	2	558	18

=== International ===
As of match played 4 September 2025

Appearances and goals by national team and year
National team	Year	Apps	Goals
Spain	2014	2	0
Spain	2015	3	0
Spain	2016	4	0
Spain	2017	4	0
Spain	2018	7	0
Spain	2019	4	0
Spain	2020	1	0
Spain	2021	1	0
Spain	2022	7	0
Spain	2023	9	0
Spain	2024	9	1
Spain	2025	1	0
Total		52	1

As of match played 4 September 2025
Scores and results list Spain's goal tally first.

List of international goals scored by Dani Carvajal
No.	Date	Venue	Cap	Opponent	Score	Result	Competition
1	15 June 2024	Olympiastadion, Berlin, Germany	45	Croatia	3–0	3–0	UEFA Euro 2024

== Honours ==
Real Madrid Castilla

- Segunda División B: 2011–12

Real Madrid

- La Liga: 2016–17, 2019–20, 2021–22, 2023–24
- Copa del Rey: 2013–14, 2022–23
- Supercopa de España: 2017, 2020, 2022, 2024
- UEFA Champions League: 2013–14, 2015–16, 2016–17, 2017–18, 2021–22, 2023–24
- UEFA Super Cup: 2014, 2016, 2017, 2022, 2024
- FIFA Club World Cup: 2014, 2016, 2017, 2018, 2022

Spain U19

- UEFA European Under-19 Championship: 2011

Spain U21

- UEFA European Under-21 Championship: 2013

Spain

- UEFA European Championship: 2024
- UEFA Nations League: 2022–23

Individual

- UEFA European Under-19 Championship Team of the Tournament: 2011
- UEFA Champions League Team of the Season: 2013–14, 2016–17, 2023–24
- UEFA La Liga Team of the Season: 2016–17
- La Liga Team of the Season: 2023–24
- ESM Team of the Year: 2023–24
- FIFPRO Men's World 11: 2024
- FIFA Men's World 11: 2024
- IFFHS Men's World Team: 2024
