= Mario Pašalić =

Croatian footballer (born 1995)

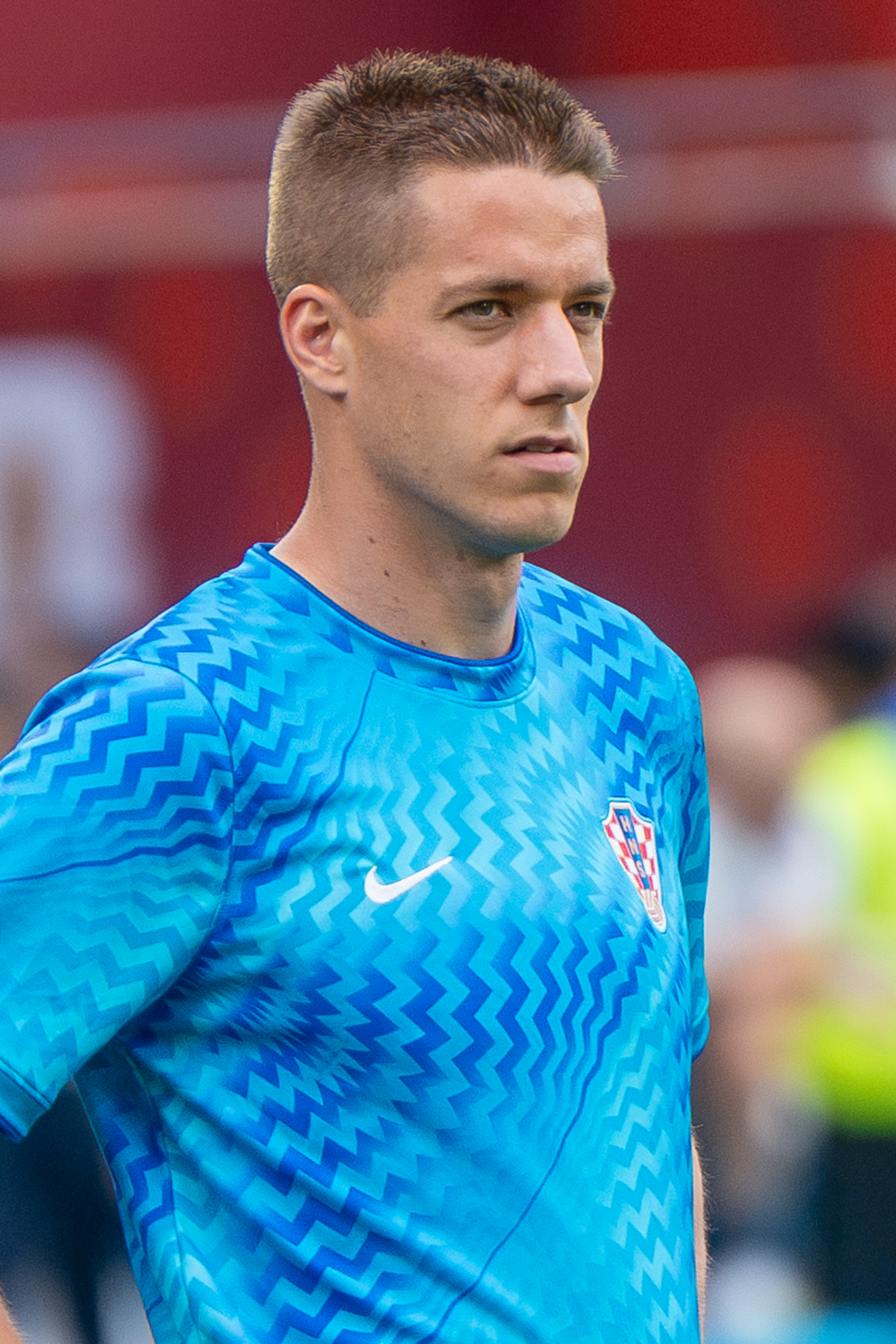
- Pašalić with Croatia in 2026

Personal information
- Full name: Mario Pašalić
- Date of birth: 9 February 1995 (age 31)
- Place of birth: Mainz, Germany
- Height: 1.88 m (6 ft 2 in)
- Position: Midfielder

Team information
- Current team: Atalanta
- Number: 8

Youth career
- 2003–2005: GOŠK Kaštel Gomilica
- 2006–2013: Hajduk Split

Senior career*
Years	Team	Apps	(Gls)
2013–2014	Hajduk Split	32	(11)
2014–2020	Chelsea	0	(0)
2014–2015	→ Elche (loan)	31	(3)
2015–2016	→ Monaco (loan)	16	(3)
2016–2017	→ AC Milan (loan)	24	(5)
2017–2018	→ Spartak Moscow (loan)	21	(4)
2018–2020	→ Atalanta (loan)	68	(14)
2020–	Atalanta	195	(36)

International career^{‡}
2009	Croatia U14	2	(0)
2011	Croatia U16	2	(0)
2011	Croatia U17	10	(2)
2013	Croatia U19	4	(2)
2014–2016	Croatia U21	12	(7)
2014–	Croatia	94	(12)
Medal record
Men's football
Representing Croatia
FIFA World Cup
Third place	2022 Qatar
UEFA Nations League
Runner-up	2023 Netherlands
- * Club domestic league appearances and goals as of 23:09, 22 May 2026 (UTC) ‡ National team caps and goals as of 22:10, 12 November 2026 (UTC)

Mario Pašalić (Croatian pronunciation: [mâːrio pǎʃalitɕ]; born 9 February 1995) is a professional footballer who plays as a midfielder for Serie A side Atalanta. Born in Germany, he plays for the Croatia national team.

Pašalić began his career at Hajduk Split before moving to Chelsea for a reported £3 million in 2014. Chelsea loaned him to Elche, Monaco, AC Milan, Spartak Moscow and then Atalanta. Following two seasons at the Bergamasque club between 2018 and 2020, he was signed permanently ahead of the 2020–21 season.

Pašalić made his senior international debut for Croatia in 2014, representing the side at UEFA Euro 2020, the 2022 FIFA World Cup, Euro 2024 and the 2026 World Cup.

== Club career ==
=== Hajduk Split ===
Pašalić started playing football at county club NK GOŠK Kaštel Gomilica before joining the Hajduk Split's youth academy in 2006. A youth international, he first gained wider recognition in the 2011–12 season, scoring 17 goals for the under-17s, despite being a midfielder, and scoring the winner for the under-19s in a 3–2 success against Hrvatski Dragovoljac, which secured the club's championship trophy.

During the pre-season, however, Pašalić was diagnosed with a staphylococcus infection, being sidelined for the first half of the 2012–13 campaign. He played his first match as a professional on 14 April 2013 replacing Ivan Vuković in the 90th minute of a 2–1 home success against Cibalia.

In summer 2013, Pašalić signed a four-year professional contract with Hajduk and went on to make 36 appearances in all competitions during the 2013–14 season, scoring 11 goals and assisting a further five. On 14 September 2013, he scored two goals in a derby 2–0 victory against Dinamo Zagreb, and repeated the same fate on 8 February the following year, in a 2–1 win at city rivals RNK Split.

=== Chelsea ===
On 9 July 2014, Chelsea announced the signing of Pašalić for an undisclosed fee. Upon signing, Pašalić stated, "I am very happy because I am now a Chelsea player."

==== Loan to Elche ====
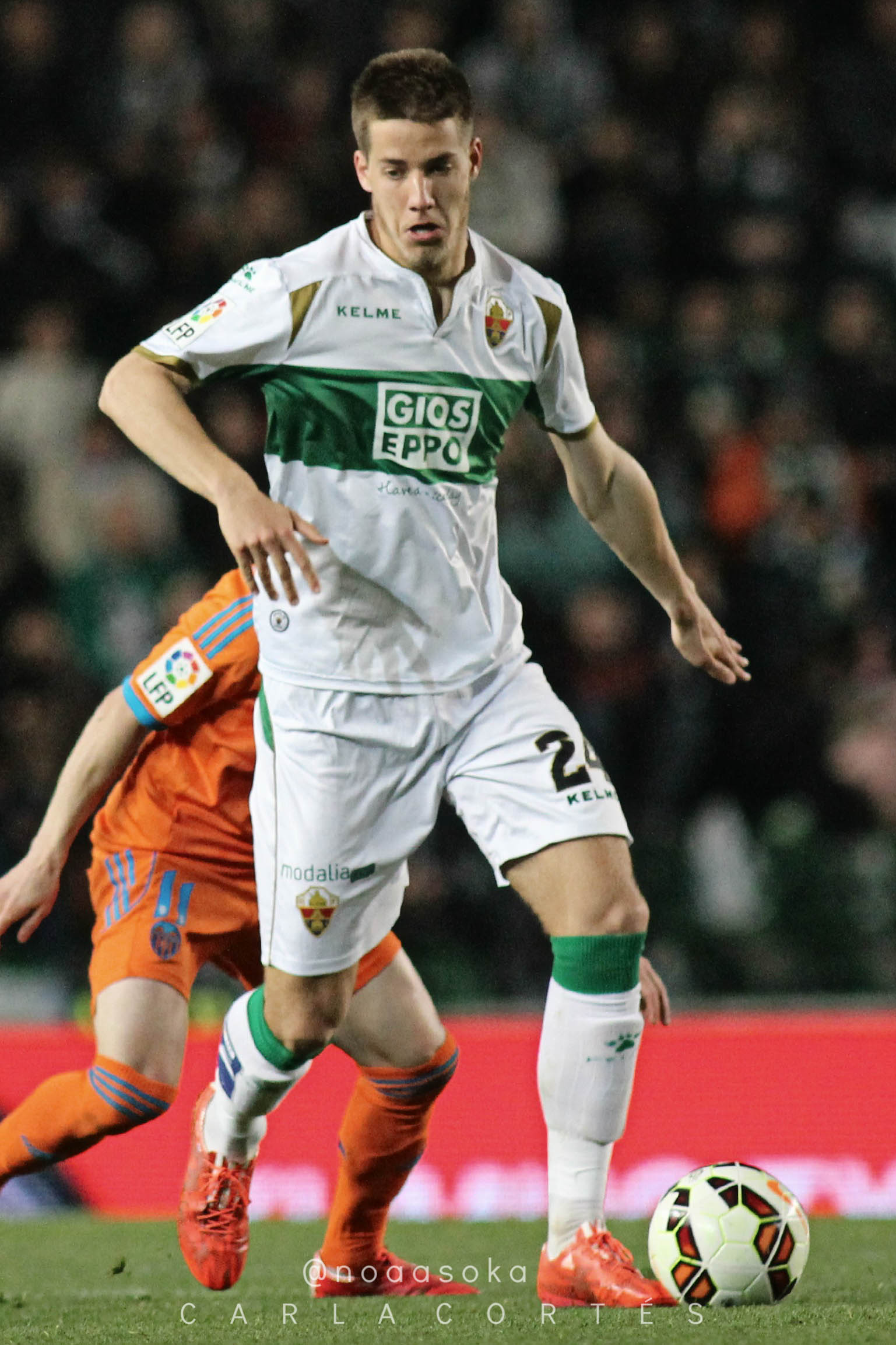
Pašalić playing for Elche in 2015

On 22 July 2014, Pašalić joined Elche on a season-long loan deal. He made his La Liga debut on 25 August, starting and being booked in a 0–3 away loss against Barcelona. On 12 April 2015, Pašalić scored his first goal in the top flight of Spanish football, netting the last in a 2–0 win over Córdoba. On 29 April 2015, Pašalić scored in a 4–0 victory over Deportivo de La Coruña. On 3 May 2015, he scored a late goal which turned out to be the winner in the match against Málaga in a 2–1 victory.

==== Loan to Monaco ====
On 3 July 2015, it was announced that Pašalić will spend the 2015–16 season on loan at Monaco. Striker Radamel Falcao went on loan to Chelsea as part of the loan agreement for Pašalić to join the Monégasque side. During an interview about his loan move to Monaco, Pašalić stated that staying at Chelsea this season was never an option and that he "needs to improve, grow and then hope to get a chance with Chelsea".

On 28 July, Pašalić made his Monaco debut in a 3–1 victory against Swiss side Young Boys in the UEFA Champions League third qualifying round, in which he scored the final goal to make it 3–1. On 8 August, Pašalić made his Ligue 1 debut after playing 25 minutes in a 2–1 win over Nice. On 19 August, Pašalić scored against Valencia, but it was not enough to stop Monaco from losing 3–1 in the first leg of the Champions League play-off. On 17 September, he made his Europa League debut in a 1–1 away draw with Anderlecht. In the 2015–16 Coupe de France, Pašalić scored twice in two appearances.

==== Loan to AC Milan ====
On 27 August 2016, Pašalić joined Serie A side AC Milan on a season-long loan. A month after the loan was completed, there were reports that stated Milan was looking to cut the loan short and return Pašalić in January. He made his debut off the substitutes' bench on 30 October 2016 in a 1–0 win against Pescara. In the following game, Pašalić made his first start in a 2–1 win over Palermo. Pašalić scored his first goal for Milan in a 2–1 home victory against Crotone.

Pašalić scored the winning penalty in the 2016 Supercoppa Italiana against Juventus, bringing Milan its first major trophy since 2011 after the regular match finished in a 1–1 draw (4–5 penalties). On 8 February 2017, Pašalić scored an 89th-minute winner against Bologna in Milan's 1–0 away win. On 2 April, Pašalić scored the equalizer in Milan's 1–1 away draw with Pescara.

==== Loan to Spartak Moscow ====
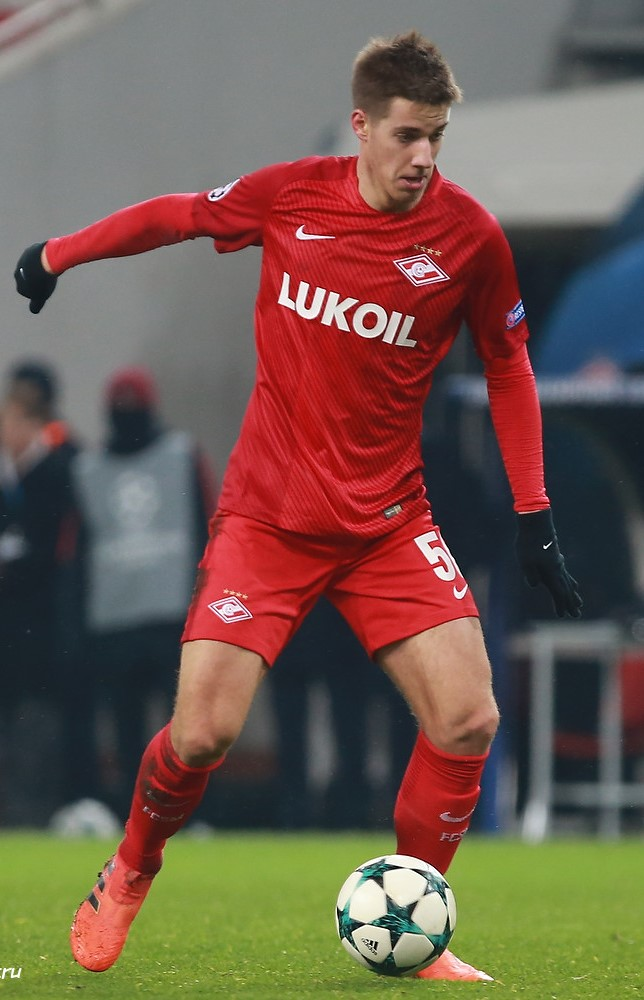
Pašalić in action for Spartak Moscow in 2017

On 2 August 2017, Pašalić signed a new four-year deal with Chelsea and joined Russian champions Spartak Moscow on loan for the 2017–18 season.

On 12 August, he scored his first goal for Spartak in a 2–1 away defeat to CSKA Moscow. He made his Champions League debut on 13 September in a 1–1 away draw with Maribor. On 27 November, he scored in a 3–1 home victory over Zenit Saint Petersburg. On 10 December, he once again scored in the Main Moscow derby, as Spartak won 3–0 at home.

=== Atalanta ===
On 25 July 2018, Pašalić agreed to join Italian side Atalanta on a season-long loan with an option to purchase at the end of the spell. The Italian side finished the season as third in Serie A, qualifying for the next year's Champions League.

On 4 July 2019, Pašalić signed a new contract at Chelsea until 2022 and returned to Atalanta on loan for a second season. On 18 September, Atalanta made their Champions League debut, as Dinamo Zagreb beat them 4–0 at Stadion Maksimir. On 6 November, Pašalić scored the equalizer against Manchester City in a 1–1 draw at San Siro. On 11 December, he scored the second goal in a 3–0 victory over Shakhtar Donetsk at Metalist Stadium. This made Atalanta the first debutant to reach the final 16 of the Champions League since Leicester City in 2016–17, and the first team ever to do it with only seven points. On 2 December 2019, Atalanta negotiated a €15 million option to buy to be activated at the end of the season.

On 15 February 2020, he scored the winning goal in a 2–1 victory over Roma, only nineteen seconds after being substituted for Duván Zapata. On 19 February, he provided two assists for Josip Iličić and Hans Hateboer, as Atalanta defeated Valencia 4–1 and went on to reach the Champions League quarter-finals. On 22 June, Mario Pašalić joined Atalanta permanently for €15 million (£13.4 million). On 14 July, he scored his first career hat-trick in a 6–2 victory over Brescia, becoming the fifth Croatian to achieve that in Serie A. On 12 August, in a Champions League quarter-final against Paris Saint-Germain at Estádio da Luz, he scored the only goal for Atalanta before getting substituted off for Luis Muriel; however, PSG managed to overturn the result scoring two goals in injury time and knocking Atalanta out.

In December 2020, Pašalić underwent a sports hernia surgery, which kept him off the pitch for more than two months. He returned to the pitch in a 3–1 defeat to Lazio, in which he scored Atalanta's only goal.

== International career ==
On 14 May 2014, Pašalić was on Croatia manager Niko Kovač's 30-man list that was named to participate in the 2014 World Cup. He was not, however, selected for the final squad. He made his debut for Croatia on 4 September 2014 when he replaced Mario Mandžukić in a friendly home victory over Cyprus.

In May 2018, he was named in Zlatko Dalić's preliminary 32-man squad for the 2018 FIFA World Cup in Russia but did not make the final 23.

He scored his debut goal for the national team on 7 October 2020 in a friendly 2–1 victory over Switzerland.

On 18 May 2026, Pašalić was selected in the 26-man squad for the 2026 FIFA World Cup.

== Personal life ==
Pašalić was born in Mainz, Germany, but grew up in Kaštel Gomilica, Croatia. His father Ivan is a Bosnian Croat from Sarajlije near Tomislavgrad. His mother Slavica hails from Vrlika. They both moved to Germany due to the Yugoslav Wars. He is a cousin of fellow footballer Ivan Krstanović.

In June 2019, Pašalić married his longtime girlfriend Marija Grbeša on the island of Čiovo. In February 2022, Pašalić and Grbeša became parents of a baby boy, whom they named Luka.

== Career statistics ==
=== Club ===
As of match played 22 May 2026

Appearances and goals by club, season and competition
Club	Season	League			National cup (Note: Includes Croatian Cup, Copa del Rey, Coupe de France, Coppa Italia, Russian Cup)		League cup (Note: Includes Coupe de la Ligue)		Europe		Other		Total	
Club	Season	Division	Apps	Goals	Apps	Goals	Apps	Goals	Apps	Goals	Apps	Goals	Apps	Goals
Hajduk Split	2012–13	Prva HNL	2	0	0	0	—		0	0	—		2	0
Hajduk Split	2013–14	Prva HNL	30	11	3	0	—		3 (Note: Appearances in UEFA Europa League)	0	1 (Note: Appearance in Croatian Super Cup)	0	37	11
Hajduk Split	Total		32	11	3	0	—		3	0	1	0	39	11
Elche (loan)	2014–15	La Liga	31	3	4	0	—		—		—		35	3
Monaco (loan)	2015–16	Ligue 1	16	3	3	2	1	0	9 (Note: Four appearances and two goals in UEFA Champions League, five appearances in UEFA Europa League)	2	—		29	7
Milan (loan)	2016–17	Serie A	24	5	2	0	—		—		1 (Note: Appearance in Supercoppa Italiana)	0	27	5
Spartak Moscow (loan)	2017–18	Russian Premier League	21	4	4	1	—		7 (Note: Six appearances in UEFA Champions League, one appearance in UEFA Europa League)	0	—		32	5
Atalanta (loan)	2018–19	Serie A	33	5	5	2	—		4	1	—		42	8
Atalanta (loan)	2019–20	Serie A	35	9	1	0	—		9 (Note: Appearances in UEFA Champions League)	3	—		45	12
Atalanta	2020–21	Serie A	25	6	3	0	—		5	0	—		33	6
Atalanta	2021–22	Serie A	37	13	2	0	—		9 (Note: Five appearances and one goal in UEFA Champions League, four appearances in UEFA Europa League)	1	—		48	14
Atalanta	2022–23	Serie A	32	5	1	0	—		—		—		33	5
Atalanta	2023–24	Serie A	34	6	5	1	—		11	1	—		50	8
Atalanta	2024–25	Serie A	34	3	2	0	—		10	3	1 (Note: Appearance in UEFA Super Cup)	0	47	6
Atalanta	2025–26	Serie A	33	3	4	4	—		9	3	—		46	10
Atalanta	Atalanta total		263	50	23	7	—		57	12	1	0	344	69
Career total			387	76	39	10	1	0	76	14	3	0	506	100

=== International ===
As of match played 12 November 2026

Appearances and goals by national team and year
National team	Year	Apps	Goals
Croatia	2014	1	0
Croatia	2015	1	0
Croatia	2016	0	0
Croatia	2017	3	0
Croatia	2018	3	0
Croatia	2019	4	0
Croatia	2020	8	2
Croatia	2021	14	4
Croatia	2022	16	1
Croatia	2023	10	3
Croatia	2024	12	0
Croatia	2025	9	1
Croatia	2026	13	1
Total		94	12

Scores and results list Croatia's goal tally first, score column indicates score after each Pašalić goal.

List of international goals scored by Mario Pašalić
No.	Date	Venue	Cap	Opponent	Score	Result	Competition
1	7 October 2020	Kybunpark, St. Gallen, Switzerland	15	Switzerland	2–1	2–1	Friendly
2	11 November 2020	Vodafone Park, Istanbul, Turkey	18	Turkey	2–2	3–3	Friendly
3	27 March 2021	Stadion Rujevica, Rijeka, Croatia	22	Cyprus	1–0	1–0	2022 FIFA World Cup qualification
4	28 June 2021	Parken Stadium, Copenhagen, Denmark	27	Spain	3–3	3–5 (a.e.t.)	UEFA Euro 2020
5	7 September 2021	Stadion Poljud, Split, Croatia	30	Slovenia	2–0	3–0	2022 FIFA World Cup qualification
6	11 November 2021	National Stadium, Ta' Qali, Malta	33	Malta	3–1	7–1	2022 FIFA World Cup qualification
7	10 June 2022	Parken Stadium, Copenhagen, Denmark	39	Denmark	1–0	1–0	2022–23 UEFA Nations League A
8	14 June 2023	De Kuip, Rotterdam, Netherlands	53	Netherlands	2–1	4–2 (a.e.t.)	2023 UEFA Nations League Finals
9	8 September 2023	Stadion Rujevica, Rijeka, Croatia	55	Latvia	5–0	5–0	UEFA Euro 2024 qualifying
10	15 October 2023	Cardiff City Stadium, Cardiff, Wales	58	Wales	1–2	1–2	UEFA Euro 2024 qualifying
11	6 June 2025	Estádio Algarve, Faro/Loulé, Portugal	75	Gibraltar	1–0	7–0	2026 FIFA World Cup qualification
12	7 June 2026	Stadion Varteks, Varaždin, Croatia	85	Slovenia	2–1	2–1	Friendly

== Honours ==
Hajduk Split reserves

- Croatian U-19 championship: 2012

Hajduk Split

- Croatian Cup: 2012–13

AC Milan

- Supercoppa Italiana: 2016

Atalanta

- UEFA Europa League: 2023–24
- Coppa Italia runner-up: 2018–19, 2020–21, 2023–24

Croatia

- FIFA World Cup third place: 2022
- UEFA Nations League runner-up: 2022–23

Individual

- Football Oscar: Prva HNL Team of the Year 2014
- Coppa Italia top scorer: 2025–26
