= Rodri =

Spanish footballer (born 1996)

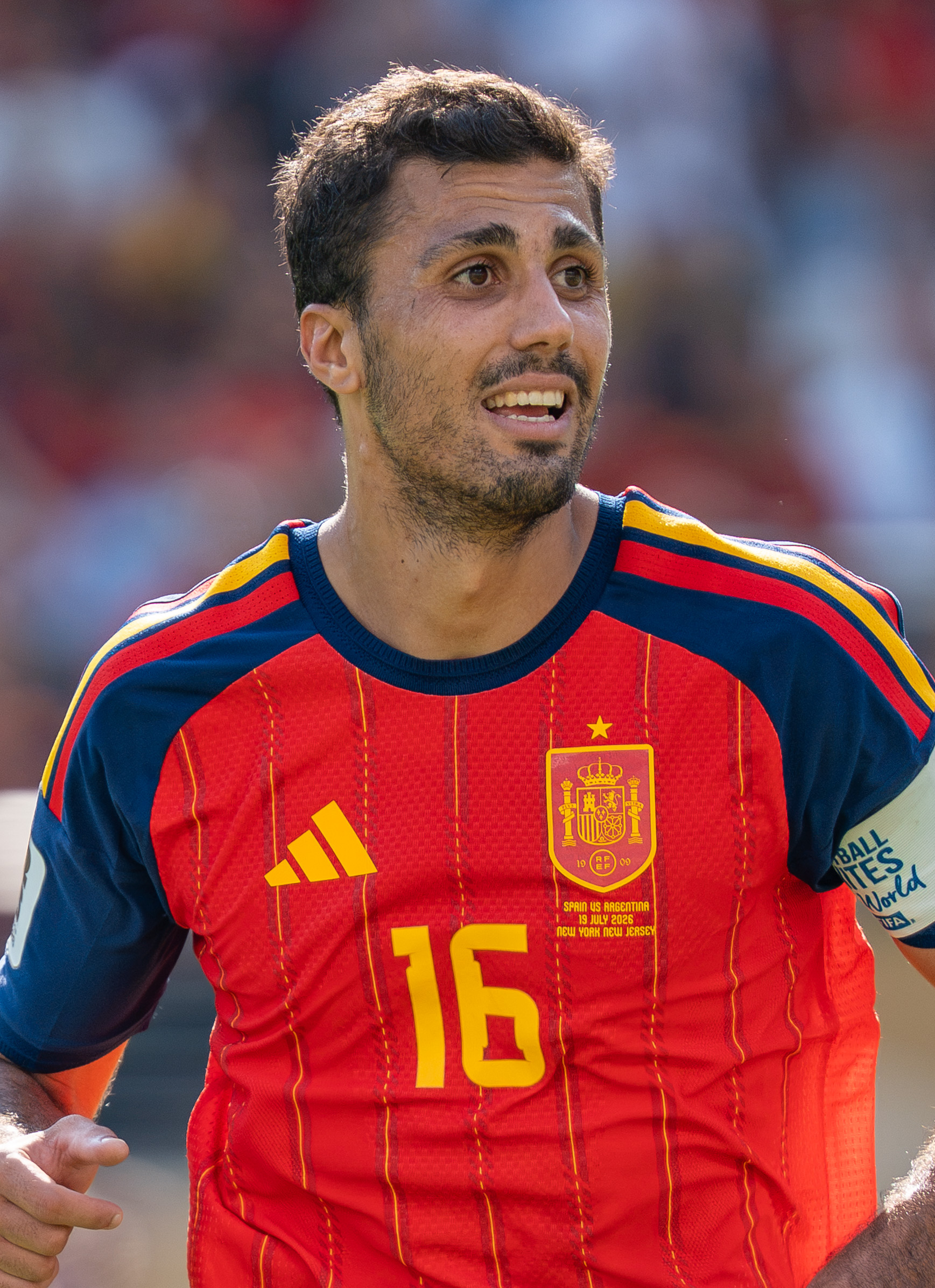
- Rodri with Spain in 2026

Personal information
- Full name: Rodrigo Hernández Cascante
- Date of birth: 22 June 1996 (age 30)
- Place of birth: Madrid, Spain
- Height: 1.90 m (6 ft 3 in)
- Position: Defensive midfielder

Team information
- Current team: Barcelona
- Number: 16

Youth career
- 2006–2007: Rayo Majadahonda
- 2007–2013: Atlético Madrid
- 2013–2015: Villarreal

Senior career*
Years	Team	Apps	(Gls)
2015–2016	Villarreal B	39	(1)
2015–2018	Villarreal	63	(1)
2018–2019	Atlético Madrid	34	(3)
2019–2026	Manchester City	196	(23)
2026–	Barcelona	11	(1)

International career^{‡}
2012	Spain U16	2	(0)
2015	Spain U19	8	(0)
2017	Spain U21	6	(1)
2018–	Spain	74	(5)
Medal record
Men's football
Representing Spain
FIFA World Cup
Winner	2026 Canada–Mexico–US
UEFA European Championship
Winner	2024 Germany
Bronze medal – third place	2020 Europe
UEFA Nations League
Winner	2023 Netherlands
Runner-up	2021 Italy
UEFA European Under-21 Championship
Runner-up	2017 Poland
UEFA European Under-19 Championship
Winner	2015 Greece
- * Club domestic league appearances and goals as of 23:53, 3 November 2026 (UTC) ‡ National team caps and goals as of 18:10, 7 October 2026 (UTC)

Rodrigo Hernández Cascante (born 22 June 1996), known as Rodrigo or simply Rodri, is a Spanish professional footballer who plays as a defensive midfielder for La Liga club Barcelona and captains the Spain national team. Widely regarded as one of the best midfielders in the world, he is known for his passing, composure, playmaking and physical attributes. (Note: Attributed to multiple references:) He is one of eleven players to have won the FIFA World Cup, UEFA Champions League, and Ballon d'Or in their career.

Rodri began his senior career with Villarreal, progressing through the club's academy before making his first-team debut in December 2015. In 2018, he joined Atlético Madrid, where he established himself as a promising midfielder and won the UEFA Super Cup in 2018. His performances earned him interest from then-Manchester City manager and compatriot Pep Guardiola. After a single season at Atlético, he signed for City in July 2019 for £62.6 million, a then-record fee for a Spanish player.

At City, Rodri developed into a centrepiece of Guardiola's team. He played a decisive role in the club's domestic dominance, winning four consecutive Premier League titles and completing the continental treble in 2022–23. Rodri scored the only goal in the 2023 UEFA Champions League final against Inter Milan, as City won their first Champions League title; he was awarded the UEFA Champions League Player of the Season. He also scored in the 2023 FIFA Club World Cup final as City claimed the title for the first time. During the 2023–24 season, he helped the club win an unprecedented fourth consecutive Premier League title.

Rodri is both a Spain international and former youth international. He made his debut for the senior national team in 2018 and represented his country at two UEFA European Championships (in 2020 and 2024) and two FIFA World Cups (in 2022 and 2026). He won the UEFA Nations League in 2023, being named the best player of the finals tournament, and was an integral part in Spain's victory at Euro 2024, for which he was named Player of the Tournament. Combining his international success with City's achievements, Rodri won the 2024 Ballon d'Or, becoming the first defensive midfielder since Lothar Matthäus in 1990 to receive the award, as well as the second Spanish player and the first City player to do so. At the 2026 World Cup, he won the Golden Ball as Spain claimed their second title (the last one being in 2010).

== Club career ==
=== Early life and career ===
Rodrigo Hernández Cascante was born on 22 June 1996 in Madrid. He joined Atlético Madrid's youth setup in 2007 aged 11, from CF Rayo Majadahonda. Released in 2013 due to a "lack of physical strength", he subsequently signed with Villarreal.

On 7 February 2015, while still a junior, Rodri made his senior debut for the reserves, coming on as a late substitute in a 3–1 away win against RCD Espanyol B in the Segunda División B. He was handed his first start 15 days later, in a 2–0 victory at Real Zaragoza B.

Rodri made his first-team debut on 17 December 2015, starting in a 2–0 home win against SD Huesca for that season's Copa del Rey. His first La Liga appearance was on 17 April 2016, when he came on as a second-half substitute for Denis Suárez in a 2–1 away loss to Rayo Vallecano.

On 4 December 2017, having already established himself as a regular, Rodri renewed his contract until 2022. He scored his first goal in the Spanish top level on 18 February 2018, the opener in a 1–1 away draw against Espanyol.

=== Atlético Madrid ===
On 24 May 2018, Rodri returned to Atlético Madrid after the club reached an agreement with Villarreal for his transfer. He signed a five-year contract with the club, for a fee in the region of €20 million, plus €5 million in variables. He made his debut on 15 August in the 2018 UEFA Super Cup in Tallinn, playing the first 71 minutes of a 4–2 extra-time win over city rivals Real Madrid. He scored his first goal for the club on 10 November 2018, netting in a 3–2 win against Athletic Bilbao.

=== Manchester City ===
==== 2019–20 season: First season in England ====
On 3 July 2019, Manchester City met the terms of Rodri's £62.6 million release clause, enabling him to buy out the remainder of his contract with Atlético and leave the club. The transfer was a new record fee paid by Manchester City. He signed a five-year contract.

Rodri, aged 23, made his debut in the 2019 FA Community Shield on 4 August at Wembley Stadium, playing the full 90 minutes as City won on penalties against Liverpool after a 1–1 draw. He made his Premier League debut against West Ham United six days later in a 5–0 away win, and on 14 September he scored his first goal in a 3–2 away defeat against Norwich City.

It was announced in October 2019 that Rodri would be out for a month due to a hamstring injury. On 1 March 2020, City won the EFL Cup at Wembley Stadium for the third consecutive time, beating Aston Villa 2–1 in the final. Rodri headed in City's second goal from a corner, which ultimately turned out to be the winner.

==== 2020–2024: Premier League success and continental treble ====
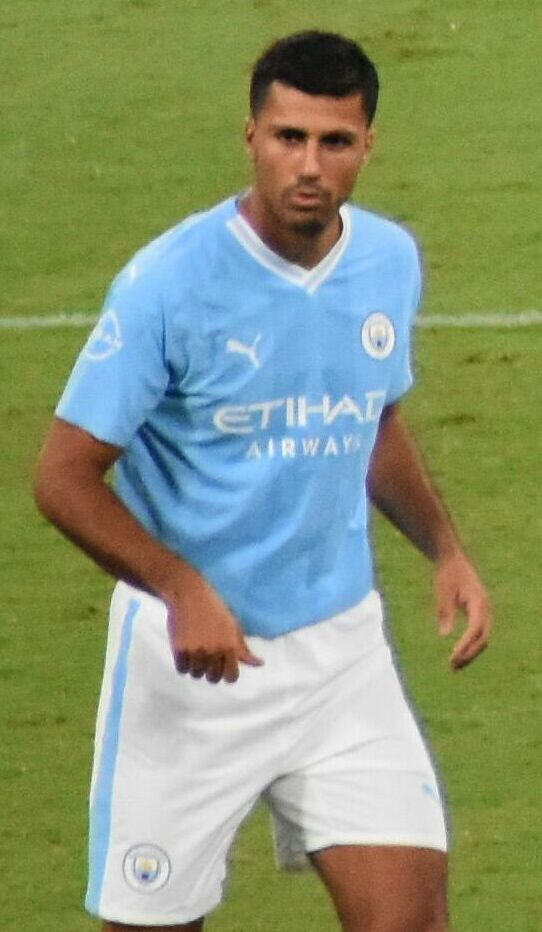
Rodri playing for Manchester City in 2023

On 13 February 2021, Rodri scored City's first goal from a penalty in a 3–0 home win over Tottenham Hotspur. During the 2021–22 domestic campaign, Rodri had a pass completion count of 82.0 per 90 minutes and a pass completion rate of 91.8% over the course of the whole season. These numbers put Rodri at the top of all midfielders in the Premier League in both categories. Multiplying those two numbers together reveals that on average, Rodri attempted one pass every 60.5 seconds of the season, leading all Premier League midfielders in that category too, with only Liverpool's Thiago coming close.

On 12 July 2022, Rodri agreed to extend his contract with Manchester City until 2027. On 11 April 2023, he scored his first UEFA Champions League goal in a 3–0 home win over Bayern Munich in the quarter-finals first leg. On 10 June, he scored the only goal in the Champions League final against Inter Milan, securing City's win for their first title in the competition, and completing the continental treble. Rodri was named player of the match, and was selected as the tournament's Player of the Season.

On 23 September 2023, Rodri was sent off in a Premier League match against Nottingham Forest for lashing out at Morgan Gibbs-White following a tussle, which sparked a melee. This was Rodri's first red card in the Premier League. City went on to lose each of the three subsequent games (against Wolverhampton Wanderers, Arsenal, and Newcastle) for which he was suspended. After his fifth yellow card against Tottenham, Rodri was suspended as City went on to lose the game again – that time against Aston Villa.

On 19 May 2024, Rodri would score a decisive goal into the bottom corner to ensure Manchester City's 3–1 win over West Ham United on the last match day of the season; City's victory saw them become the first club in English history to lift the league trophy in four consecutive seasons. Additionally, he reached his 50th consecutive undefeated Premier League match with his club, placing him second only to Sol Campbell with 56 games.

==== 2024–2026: Injury, return and departure ====
On 22 September 2024, Rodri was withdrawn in the first half of Manchester City's 2–2 draw with Arsenal, due an anterior cruciate ligament (ACL) and meniscus injury, ruling him out for the majority of the 2024–25 season. In October 2024, he was awarded the 2024 Ballon d'Or for his performances. On 20 May 2025, he made his comeback from the long-term injury, coming on as a late substitute in a 3–1 win against Bournemouth in the penultimate match of the season. He appeared in 33 fixtures for Manchester City in all competitions during their 2025–26 season, and he was sidelined for two spells due to hamstring and groin injuries.

=== Barcelona ===
On 18 August 2026, Rodri signed for La Liga club Barcelona on a four-year contract. The transfer fee was reportedly €76.5m, fixed fee of €60m and €16.5m add-ons. In the meantime, Real Madrid coach José Mourinho revealed that the club had made Rodri a very good offer, but the midfielder's hesitation over the move ultimately led Madrid to abandon their pursuit.

On 27 August, Rodri made his La Liga debut for Barcelona against Athletic Bilbao, coming on as a second-half substitute to replace Marc Bernal in a 2–0 home win.

On 17 October, Rodri made his debut goal for Barcelona in a 5-2 away win against Real Betis, scoring an header assisted by Fermín Lopez following a corner kick.

== International career ==
=== Youth career ===
After playing for Spain at under-16, under-19 and under-21 levels, Rodri was first selected by the full side on 16 March 2018 for two friendlies with Germany and Argentina. He made his debut five days later, replacing Thiago Alcântara late in the 1–1 draw against Germany in Düsseldorf.

=== Senior career ===
==== 2018–2021: First international tournaments ====
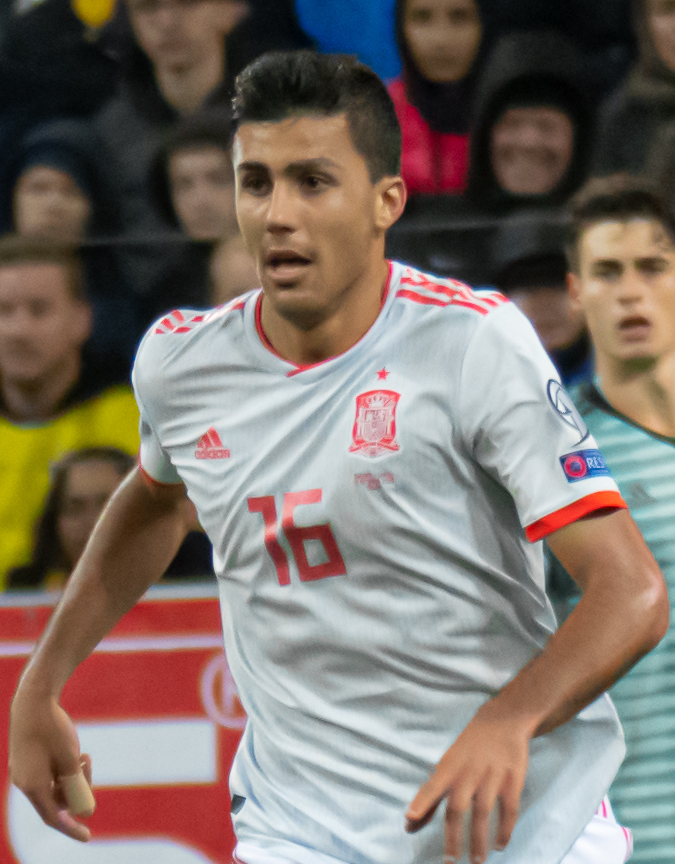
Rodri playing for Spain in 2019

After missing out on selection for the 2018 FIFA World Cup, Rodri was named in Spain's squad for their first two UEFA Nations League fixtures against England and Croatia in September 2018. After being an unused substitute in the first match at Wembley Stadium, he made his competitive debut as a 59th minute substitute for Sergio Busquets in the 6–0 win over Croatia on 11 September. A month later, Rodri made his first start for Spain in a 4–1 friendly win over Wales in Cardiff and was named man of the match by the BBC.

Rodri played in seven of Spain's ten matches during UEFA Euro 2020 qualifying, starting in five.

On 17 November 2020, Rodri scored his first senior international goal in Spain's 6–0 win over Germany in their final group phase match of the 2020–21 UEFA Nations League. The win in Seville ensured La Roja would finish top of Group 4 and qualify for the 2021 UEFA Nations League Finals in Italy.

In June 2021, he was included in Luis Enrique's 24-man squad for the postponed UEFA Euro 2020 finals. In the absence of captain Sergio Busquets due to COVID-19, Rodri started the team's first two matches of the tournament as they drew 0–0 with Poland and 1–1 with Sweden. With Busquets' return for the final Group E match against Slovakia, Rodri was an unused substitute in the 5–0 win that secured Spain's place in the knockout stage. In the round of 16 match against Croatia, Rodri replaced Busquets in the 102nd minute as the team won 5–3 after extra time. He again appeared as a substitute in the quarter-final draw with Switzerland, coming on for Pedri in the final minute of extra time ahead of the penalty shootout. Although Rodri's kick was saved by Swiss goalkeeper Yann Sommer, Spain won the shootout 4–2 to reach the semi-final. Rodri appeared as a 70th-minute substitute for Koke as Spain drew 1–1 with Italy in the semi-final, losing 4–2 in the penalty shootout.

In October 2021, Rodri was included in Spain's squad for the Nations League finals. On 10 October, he started in Spain's 2–1 defeat against France in the final, playing 84 minutes at the San Siro in Milan.

==== 2022–2023: World Cup and Nations League title ====
Rodri was included in Spain's squad for the 2022 FIFA World Cup and was used as a central defender. He played the full 90 minutes in Spain's three Group E matches, where they won 7–0 against Costa Rica, drew 1–1 with Germany and lost 2–1 to Japan. In the round of 16, he played 120 minutes of the team's 0–0 draw with Morocco, as La Roja were eliminated after losing 3–0 in the penalty shootout. Throughout the tournament, Rodri broke compatriot Xavi's 2010 record for most passes completed in a single edition of the World Cup (599), completing 638 out of 684 attempted passes, with a 93% success rate.

After the international retirement of Sergio Busquets on 16 December 2022, Rodri succeeded him as Spain's midfield pivot. On 28 March 2023, he captained the team for the first time in their second UEFA Euro 2024 qualifier, where they lost 2–0 to Scotland at Hampden Park.

In June 2023, Rodri was named as Player of the Finals for the 2023 UEFA Nations League Finals. He started in both the semi-final against Italy and the final against Croatia, the latter of which Spain won via a penalty shootout, with Rodri scoring his spot kick. He was named the best player of the tournament.

On 26 March 2024, Rodri captained Spain for the second time in a friendly match against Brazil. He scored his second and third senior international goals in the 3–3 draw, both from penalty kicks.

==== UEFA Euro 2024 title ====
In June 2024, Rodri was named in Spain's squad for UEFA Euro 2024 in Germany. In the team's final warm-up match – a 5–1 win over Northern Ireland in Mallorca – he won his 50th cap for Spain.

In the team's opening match of the tournament, he played 86 minutes before being substituted for Martin Zubimendi as La Roja beat Croatia 3–0 at Berlin's Olympiastadion.

Rodri helped Spain reach and win the UEFA Euro 2024 final with an outstanding tournament performance, as he was awarded the best player of the tournament, scoring one goal, and having a 92% passing accuracy. Spain defeated England 2–1 to secure their fourth European championship. In addition, he became one of 12 players who won both youth and senior Euro titles, alongside his teammates Nacho, Ferran Torres, Álvaro Morata and Mikel Merino.

During Spain's celebrations of their Euro 2024 victory over England, Rodri and Spanish captain Álvaro Morata were filmed chanting "Gibraltar is Spanish". The chants were labelled "rancid", "discriminatory" and "hugely offensive to Gibraltarians" by the Government of Gibraltar, and led to an official complaint to UEFA by the government and the Gibraltar Football Association. After an investigation was opened on 19 July, Rodri and Morata were formally charged under Article 11 of UEFA on 23 July. The pair were given a one match ban.

==== 2026 FIFA World Cup title ====
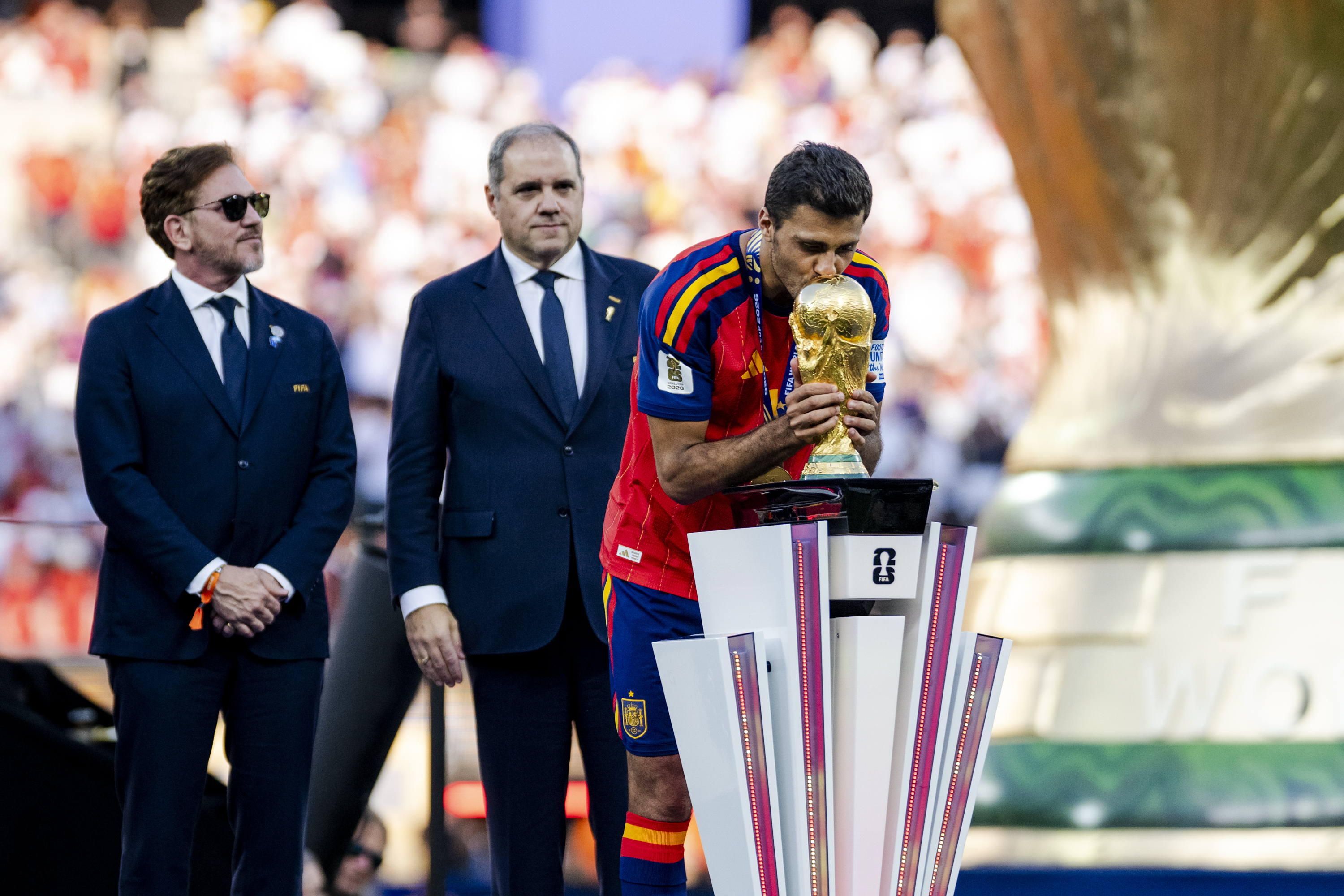
Rodri kissing the FIFA World Cup Trophy after winning the final in 2026

On 25 May 2026, Rodri was named in Spain’s squad for the 2026 FIFA World Cup. At the tournament, he served as Spain's captain. Rodri started in all eight of Spain's matches, and following a 1–0 win over Argentina in the final, he was awarded the Golden Ball. While Rodri did not score or assist during the tournament, he was credited with effective passing that allowed Spain to control the matches they played, completing more passes than any other player – a 747 out of 799 attempted (over 93 passes per match) – with a 93% passing accuracy, a record for a single tournament, since statistics began to be collected in 1966, breaking the previous record he had set four years earlier; he also completed the most touches (910), passes in the opposition half (428), and line-breaking passes (122) throughout the tournament, including in the final third (76). Moreover, with 101 passes in the final, he became one of only three players, aside from compatriot Pau Cubarsí (121) in the same match, and Brazil's Dunga in 1994 (130), to complete over 100 passes in a World Cup final. He also covered more distance than any other player throughout the tournament (96233.71m).

== Player profile ==
=== Style of play ===
Rodri is a physically strong and tall player. His physique helps him to frequently win tackles, challenges on opponent players, as well as aerial duels. He has a 73% success rate at tackles on opponent players, and has won 100% of his aerial duels in the 2022–23 season, according to Squawka. He averages a passing accuracy of 91–92%.

Rodri is additionally known for his versatility and tactical intelligence. He is known for his contributions to his team's build-up play. Often used as an anchor, or "water carrier", his primary role is to win back possession in midfield and distribute the ball to start counterattacks. His ability to maintain possession under pressure allows him to perform this role effectively.

Rodri's tactical evolution under Pep Guardiola redefined the modern holding midfielder role. According to a Sky Sports analysis, his positional intelligence and composure under pressure were essential to Manchester City's midfield control. He often positions himself between the centre-backs to facilitate build-up play and maintain possession, allowing the team to transition smoothly from defence to attack. His precise distribution and spatial awareness made him a central figure in Guardiola's system.

In addition to his defensive abilities, Rodri also possesses accurate passing and vision, allowing him to operate as a deep-lying playmaker from the core of the midfield. In the 2023–24 season, he was involved in more sequences of play than any other player in his team or in the Premier League. He is also known for his ability to set the tempo of the game.

Besides his regular position of a holding midfielder, he has occasionally been used as a ball-playing centre-back, in particular by national team manager Luis Enrique during the 2022 World Cup.

During his Manchester City tenure, he also worked to improve his goalscoring, and became known for his long-range shooting, which resulted in several goals, such as his match-winning goal from outside the box against Inter in the 2023 UEFA Champions League Final. Despite not being particularly renowned for his pace, he has been credited by pundits for his ability to catch up with much faster attackers in midfield. Rodri was awarded the Ballon d'Or in 2024, recognising his exceptional performances throughout the season.

=== Reception ===
Rodri is widely regarded as one of the best midfielders in the world. In January 2024, members of the ESPN FC staff debated whether Rodri was in fact that best player in the world at the moment. In March 2024, Guardiola described him as "the best midfield player, currently, in the world by far." That same month, The New York Times rated him as the best player in the Premier League, while former Manchester United defender Rio Ferdinand believed that Rodri was already arguably the best defensive midfielder in the league's history. He was nominated for the 2023 Ballon d'Or, ultimately finishing fifth. He won the 2024 Ballon d'Or, finishing ahead of Vinícius Júnior and Jude Bellingham, becoming the first Manchester City player, as well as the first Premier League player since Cristiano Ronaldo in 2008, to win the award. His sustained performances sparked debates over his status among the greatest players in Premier League history. Following Spain's victory at the 2026 FIFA World Cup, where he was awarded the Golden Ball as the tournament's best player, he became only the seventh player in history, and the first based in the Premier League, to win the World Cup, the UEFA European Championship, the UEFA Champions League, and the Ballon d'Or.

Rodri's critical importance to Manchester City's tactical system has been widely noted by sports analysts and statisticians. His influence is statistically reflected in the team's overall performance; data consistently shows a significant decline in Manchester City's win rate and points-per-game average during his absences. Following a season-ending knee injury in September 2024, manager Pep Guardiola described him as an "irreplaceable" player, stating that the squad lacked another midfielder capable of replicating his specific tactical contributions. Guardiola commended his broader influence on the sport, stating that Rodri "perfectly represents City, but also Spanish football and their influence in world football." Pundits and sports journalists have frequently highlighted his unmatched statistical consistency in passing accuracy, possession recovery, and positional intelligence, crediting him with evolving the traditional defensive midfield role into a primary deep-lying playmaking pivot.

== Personal life ==
While a Villarreal youth player, Rodri studied at the Jaume I University in nearby Castellón de la Plana for four years to gain a degree in business administration and management. At university, he met his longterm girlfriend Laura, who was studying medicine. Rodri is a Roman Catholic, in an interview after the 2024 Euro final he said: "In life and in sport, when you do things right, in the end, God rewards you for it. I’m grateful.” And made a similar statement after the 2026 World Cup tournament. He avoids using social media.

== Career statistics ==
=== Club ===
As of match played 3 November 2026

Appearances and goals by club, season and competition
Club	Season	League			National cup (Note: Includes Copa del Rey, FA Cup)		League cup (Note: Includes EFL Cup)		Europe		Other		Total	
Club	Season	Division	Apps	Goals	Apps	Goals	Apps	Goals	Apps	Goals	Apps	Goals	Apps	Goals
Villarreal B	2014–15	Segunda División B	7	0	—		—		—		—		7	0
Villarreal B	2015–16	Segunda División B	32	1	—		—		—		2 (Note: Appearances in Segunda División B play-offs)	1	34	2
Villarreal B	Total		39	1	—		—		—		2	1	41	2
Villarreal	2015–16	La Liga	3	0	3	0	—		0	0	—		6	0
Villarreal	2016–17	La Liga	23	0	4	0	—		4 (Note: Appearances in UEFA Europa League)	1	—		31	1
Villarreal	2017–18	La Liga	37	1	4	0	—		6	0	—		47	1
Villarreal	Total		63	1	11	0	—		10	1	—		84	2
Atlético Madrid	2018–19	La Liga	34	3	4	0	—		8 (Note: Appearance(s) in UEFA Champions League)	0	1 (Note: Appearance in UEFA Super Cup)	0	47	3
Manchester City	2019–20	Premier League	35	3	4	0	4	1	8	0	1 (Note: Appearance in FA Community Shield)	0	52	4
Manchester City	2020–21	Premier League	34	2	4	0	5	0	10	0	—		53	2
Manchester City	2021–22	Premier League	33	7	2	0	0	0	10	0	1	0	46	7
Manchester City	2022–23	Premier League	36	2	4	0	3	0	12	2	1	0	56	4
Manchester City	2023–24	Premier League	34	8	4	0	0	0	8	1	4 (Note: One appearance in FA Community Shield, one appearance in UEFA Super Cup, two appearances in FIFA Club World Cup)	0	50	9
Manchester City	2024–25	Premier League	3	0	0	0	0	0	1	0	4 (Note: Appearances in FIFA Club World Cup)	0	8	0
Manchester City	2025–26	Premier League	21	1	4	1	3	0	5	0	—		33	2
Manchester City	Total		196	23	22	1	15	1	54	3	11	0	298	28
Barcelona	2026–27	La Liga	11	1	0	0	—		3	0	0	0	14	1
Career total			343	29	37	1	15	1	75	4	14	1	484	36

=== International ===
As of match played 6 October 2026

Appearances and goals by national team and year
National team	Year	Apps	Goals
Spain	2018	4	0
Spain	2019	7	0
Spain	2020	6	1
Spain	2021	13	0
Spain	2022	9	0
Spain	2023	9	0
Spain	2024	9	3
Spain	2025	2	0
Spain	2026	15	1
Total		74	5

As of match played 19 July 2026
Spain score listed first, score column indicates score after each Rodri goal

List of international goals scored by Rodri
No.	Date	Venue	Cap	Opponent	Score	Result	Competition	Ref.
1	17 November 2020	La Cartuja, Seville, Spain	17	Germany	3–0	6–0	2020–21 UEFA Nations League A	
2	26 March 2024	Santiago Bernabéu, Madrid, Spain	49	Brazil	1–0	3–3	Friendly	
3	26 March 2024	Santiago Bernabéu, Madrid, Spain	49	Brazil	3–2	3–3	Friendly	
4	30 June 2024	RheinEnergieStadion, Cologne, Germany	53	Georgia	1–1	4–1	UEFA Euro 2024	
5	3 October 2026	Estadio Carlos Tartiere, Oviedo, Spain	73	Czech Republic	2–0	3–1	2026–27 UEFA Nations League A	

== Honours ==
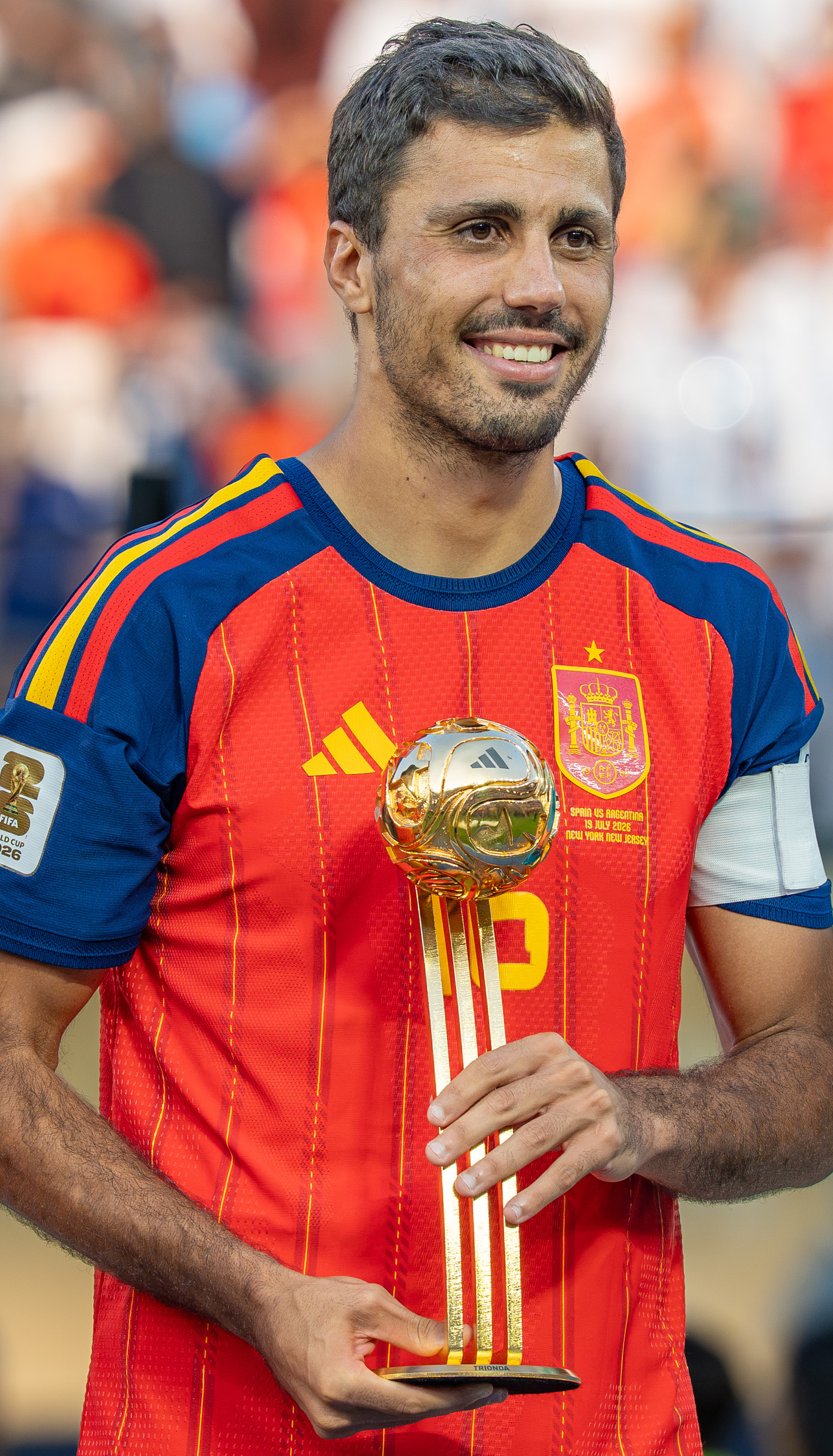
Rodri with the 2026 FIFA World Cup Golden Ball

Atlético Madrid

- UEFA Super Cup: 2018

Manchester City

- Premier League: 2020–21, 2021–22, 2022–23, 2023–24
- FA Cup: 2022–23, 2025–26
- EFL Cup: 2019–20, 2020–21, 2025–26
- FA Community Shield: 2019
- UEFA Champions League: 2022–23
- UEFA Super Cup: 2023
- FIFA Club World Cup: 2023

Spain U19

- UEFA European Under-19 Championship: 2015

Spain U21

- UEFA European Under-21 Championship runner-up: 2017

Spain

- FIFA World Cup: 2026
- UEFA European Championship: 2024
- UEFA Nations League: 2022–23; runner-up: 2020–21

Individual

- Ballon d'Or: 2024
- IFFHS World's Best Player: 2024
- FIFA World Cup Golden Ball: 2026
- UEFA European Championship Player of the Tournament: 2024
- World Soccer Player of the Year: 2024
- FourFourTwo Player of the Year: 2024
- The Guardian Best Footballer in the World: 2024
- CIES Football Observatory Most Impactful Player of the Season: 2023–24
- UEFA Champions League Player of the Season: 2022–23
- FIFA Club World Cup Golden Ball: 2023
- UEFA Nations League Finals Player of the Tournament: 2023
- FIFPRO Men's World 11: 2024, 2026
- FIFA Men's World 11: 2024
- IFFHS World's Best Football Men Defensive Midfielder: 2023, 2024
- IFFHS Men's UEFA Team: 2024
- IFFHS Men's World Team: 2023, 2024
- IFFHS Best Defensive Midfielder of the World Cup: 2026
- FIFA World Cup Dream XI: 2026
- UEFA European Championship Team of the Tournament: 2024
- UEFA Champions League Team of the Season: 2022–23
- PFA Team of the Year: 2022–23 Premier League, 2023–24 Premier League
- Premier League Fan Team of the Season: 2023–24
- Premier League Goal of the Month: November 2021
- The Athletic Premier League Player of the Season: 2023–24
- The Athletic Premier League Team of the Season: 2023–24
- The Athletic European Men's Team of the Season: 2023–24
- Globe Soccer Awards Best Midfielder of the Year: 2023
- UEFA European Under-19 Championship Team of the Tournament: 2015
