= Bulgaria national football team results (2020–present) =

This is a list of the Bulgaria national football team results from 2020 to present.

== Results ==
Key
Win
Draw
Defeat

=== 2020 ===
26 February Friendly	Bulgaria	0–1	Belarus	Sofia, Bulgaria
17:00 UTC+2		Report	Podstrelov 15'	Stadium: Vasil Levski National Stadium; Attendance: 250; Referee: Trustin Farrugia Cann (Malta)

3 September UEFA Nations League	Bulgaria	1–1	Republic of Ireland	Sofia, Bulgaria
21:45 UTC+3	Kraev 56'	Report	Duffy 90+3'	Stadium: Vasil Levski National Stadium; Attendance: 0 (Note: Due to the COVID-19 pandemic in Europe, all matches scheduled for September 2020 were played behind closed doors.); Referee: Manuel Schüttengruber (Austria)

6 September UEFA Nations League	Wales	1–0	Bulgaria	Cardiff, Wales
14:00 UTC+1	N. Williams 90+4'	Report		Stadium: Cardiff City Stadium; Attendance: 0 Referee: Fábio Veríssimo (Portugal)

8 October UEFA Euro 2020 PO SF	Bulgaria	1–3	Hungary	Sofia, Bulgaria
21:45 UTC+3	Yomov 89'	Report	Orbán 17'; Kalmár 47'; Nikolić 75'	Stadium: Vasil Levski National Stadium; Attendance: 1,929; Referee: Szymon Marciniak (Poland)

11 October UEFA Nations League	Finland	2–0	Bulgaria	Helsinki, Finland
19:00 UTC+3	Taylor 52'; Jensen 67'	Report		Stadium: Olympic Stadium; Attendance: 6,587; Referee: Erik Lambrechts (Belgium)

14 October UEFA Nations League	Bulgaria	0–1	Wales	Sofia, Bulgaria
21:45 UTC+3		Report	J. Williams 85'	Stadium: Vasil Levski National Stadium; Attendance: 478; Referee: Aliyar Aghayev (Azerbaijan)

11 November Friendly	Bulgaria	3–0	Gibraltar	Sofia, Bulgaria
19:30 UTC+2	Tsvetkov 5'; Yomov 14'; D. Iliev 45'	Report		Stadium: Vasil Levski National Stadium; Attendance: 0 Referee: Sebastian Colțescu (Romania)

15 November UEFA Nations League	Bulgaria	1–2	Finland	Sofia, Bulgaria
19:00 UTC+2	D. Iliev 68' (pen.)	Report	Pukki 7'; Lod 45+1'	Stadium: Vasil Levski National Stadium; Attendance: 0 Referee: Donatas Rumšas (Lithuania)

18 November UEFA Nations League	Republic of Ireland	0–0	Bulgaria	Dublin, Republic of Ireland
19:45 UTC+0		Report		Stadium: Aviva Stadium; Attendance: 0 Referee: Lawrence Visser (Belgium)

=== 2021 ===
25 March 2022 FIFA World Cup qualification	Bulgaria	1–3	Switzerland	Sofia, Bulgaria
19:00 UTC+2	Despodov 46'	Report	Embolo 7'; Seferovic 10'; Zuber 13'	Stadium: Vasil Levski National Stadium; Attendance: 0 Referee: Nikola Dabanović (Montenegro)

28 March 2022 FIFA World Cup qualification	Bulgaria	0–2	Italy	Sofia, Bulgaria
21:45 UTC+3		Report	Belotti 43' (pen.); Locatelli 83'	Stadium: Vasil Levski National Stadium; Attendance: 0 Referee: Slavko Vinčić (Slovenia)

31 March 2022 FIFA World Cup qualification	Northern Ireland	0–0	Bulgaria	Belfast, Northern Ireland
19:45 UTC+1		Report		Stadium: Windsor Park; Attendance: 0 Referee: Yigal Frid (Israel)

1 June Friendly	Slovakia	1–1	Bulgaria	Ried im Innkreis, Austria
18:00 UTC+2	Bénes 27'	Report	A. Iliev 9'	Stadium: Keine Sorgen Arena; Attendance: 0 Referee: Walter Altmann (Austria)

5 June Friendly	Russia	1–0	Bulgaria	Moscow, Russia
18:00 UTC+3	Sobolev 84' (pen.)	Report		Stadium: VTB Arena; Attendance: 11,100; Referee: Aleksei Kulbakov (Belarus)

8 June Friendly	France	3–0	Bulgaria	Saint-Denis, France
21:10 UTC+2	Griezmann 29'; Giroud 83', 90'	Report		Stadium: Stade de France; Attendance: 5,000; Referee: Tasos Sidiropoulos (Greece)

2 September 2022 FIFA World Cup qualification	Italy	1–1	Bulgaria	Florence, Italy
20:45 UTC+2	Chiesa 16'	Report	A. Iliev 39'	Stadium: Stadio Artemio Franchi; Attendance: 14,366; Referee: Serdar Gözübüyük (Netherlands)

5 September 2022 FIFA World Cup qualification	Bulgaria	1–0	Lithuania	Sofia, Bulgaria
19:00 UTC+3	Chochev 82'	Report		Stadium: Vasil Levski National Stadium; Attendance: 2,503; Referee: John Beaton (Scotland)

8 September Friendly	Bulgaria	4–1	Georgia	Sofia, Bulgaria
19:30 UTC+2	Nedelev 20'; D. Iliev 34' (pen.); Delev 44'; A. Hristov 53'	Report	Davitashvili 77'	Stadium: Vasil Levski National Stadium; Attendance: 504; Referee: Igor Stojchevski (North Macedonia)

9 October 2022 FIFA World Cup qualification	Lithuania	3–1	Bulgaria	Vilnius, Lithuania
16:00 UTC+3	Lasickas 18'; Černych 82', 84'	Report	Despodov 64'	Stadium: LFF Stadium; Attendance: 2,526; Referee: Yevhen Aranovskyi (Ukraine)

12 October 2022 FIFA World Cup qualification	Bulgaria	2–1	Northern Ireland	Sofia, Bulgaria
21:45 UTC+3	Nedelev 53', 63'	Report	Washington 35'	Stadium: Vasil Levski National Stadium; Attendance: 822; Referee: Aleksei Kulbakov (Belarus)

11 November Friendly	Ukraine	1–1	Bulgaria	Odesa, Ukraine
19:30 UTC+2	Stepanenko 80'	Report	Kirilov 35'	Stadium: Chornomorets Stadium; Attendance: 10,000; Referee: Arda Kardeşler (Turkey)

15 November 2022 FIFA World Cup qualification	Switzerland	4–0	Bulgaria	Lucerne, Switzerland
20:45 UTC+1	Okafor 48'; Vargas 57'; Itten 72'; Freuler 90+1'	Report		Stadium: Swissporarena; Attendance: 14,300; Referee: Benoît Bastien (France)

=== 2022 ===
26 March Friendly	Qatar	2–1	Bulgaria	Al Rayyan, Qatar
20:30 UTC+3	Afif 27' (pen.); Khoukhi 72'	Report	Despodov 60'	Stadium: Education City Stadium; Attendance: 1,948; Referee: Mohammed Al Hoish (Saudi Arabia)

29 March Friendly	Croatia	2–1	Bulgaria	Al Rayyan, Qatar
18:00 UTC+3	Modrić 76' (pen.); Kramarić 80'	Report	Despodov 69'	Stadium: Education City Stadium; Attendance: 1,000; Referee: Khamis Mohammed Al-Marri (Qatar)

2 June UEFA Nations League	Bulgaria	1–1	North Macedonia	Razgrad, Bulgaria
19:00 UTC+3	Despodov 13'	Report	M. Ristovski 50'	Stadium: Huvepharma Arena; Attendance: 8,275; Referee: Jérémie Pignard (France)

5 June UEFA Nations League	Bulgaria	2–5	Georgia	Razgrad, Bulgaria
21:45 UTC+3	A. Iliev 50'; Stefanov 83'	Report	Davitashvili 4'; A. Hristov 31' (o.g.); Zivzivadze 52'; Kvaratskhelia 58' (pen.); Qazaishvili 69'	Stadium: Huvepharma Arena; Attendance: 3,600; Referee: Fabio Maresca (Italy)

9 June UEFA Nations League	Gibraltar	1–1	Bulgaria	Gibraltar
20:45 UTC+2	Walker 61' (pen.)	Report	G. Minchev 45+1'	Stadium: Victoria Stadium; Attendance: 1,427; Referee: Petri Viljanen (Finland)

12 June UEFA Nations League	Georgia	0–0	Bulgaria	Tbilisi, Georgia
20:00 UTC+4		Report		Stadium: Boris Paichadze Dinamo Arena; Attendance: 54,200; Referee: Espen Eskås (Norway)

23 September UEFA Nations League	Bulgaria	5–1	Gibraltar	Razgrad, Bulgaria
21:45 UTC+3	Antov 23'; Despodov 36'; Kirilov 52'; Stefanov 55'; M. Petkov 81'	Report	R. Chipolina 26'	Stadium: Huvepharma Arena; Attendance: 1,540; Referee: Pavel Orel (Czech Republic)

26 September UEFA Nations League	North Macedonia	0–1	Bulgaria	Skopje, North Macedonia
20:45 UTC+2		Report	Despodov 50'	Stadium: Toše Proeski Arena; Attendance: 20,173; Referee: Julian Weinberger (Austria)

16 November Friendly	Cyprus	0–2	Bulgaria	Larnaca, Cyprus
20:00 UTC+2		Report	Despodov 24'; Delev 71'	Stadium: AEK Arena – Georgios Karapatakis; Attendance: 1,000; Referee: Trustin Farrugia Cann (Malta)

20 November Friendly	Luxembourg	0–0	Bulgaria	Luxembourg City, Luxembourg
15:00 UTC+1		Report		Stadium: Stade de Luxembourg; Attendance: 4,700; Referee: Manfredas Lukjančukas (Lithuania)

=== 2023 ===
24 March UEFA Euro 2024 qualifying	Bulgaria	0–1	Montenegro	Razgrad, Bulgaria
19:00 UTC+2		Report	Krstović 70'	Stadium: Huvepharma Arena; Attendance: 9,180; Referee: Aliyar Aghayev (Azerbaijan)

27 March UEFA Euro 2024 qualifying	Hungary	3–0	Bulgaria	Budapest, Hungary
20:45 UTC+2	Vécsei 7'; Szoboszlai 26'; Ádám 39'	Report		Stadium: Puskás Aréna; Attendance: 53,000; Referee: Halil Umut Meler (Turkey)

17 June UEFA Euro 2024 qualifying	Lithuania	1–1	Bulgaria	Kaunas, Lithuania
16:00 UTC+3	Girdvainis 15'	Report	M. Petkov 27'	Stadium: Darius and Girėnas Stadium; Attendance: 14,230; Referee: Jakob Alexander Sundberg (Denmark)

20 June UEFA Euro 2024 qualifying	Bulgaria	1–1	Serbia	Razgrad, Bulgaria
21:45 UTC+3	Despodov 47'	Report	Lazović 90+6'	Stadium: Huvepharma Arena; Attendance: 6,700; Referee: Craig Pawson (England)

7 September Friendly	Bulgaria	0–1	Iran	Plovdiv, Bulgaria
19:00 UTC+3		Report	Mohebi 14'	Stadium: Hristo Botev Stadium; Attendance: 9,500; Referee: Lazar Lukić (Serbia)

10 September UEFA Euro 2024 qualifying	Montenegro	2–1	Bulgaria	Podgorica, Montenegro
19:00 UTC+3	Savić 45+1'; Jovetić 90+6'	Report	Borukov 79'	Stadium: City Stadium; Attendance: 4,232; Referee: Harm Osmers (Germany)

14 October UEFA Euro 2024 qualifying	Bulgaria	0–2	Lithuania	Sofia, Bulgaria
19:00 UTC+3		Report	Širvys 45', 55'	Stadium: Vasil Levski National Stadium; Attendance: 6,916; Referee: Giorgi Kruashvili (Georgia)

17 October Friendly	Albania	2–0	Bulgaria	Tirana, Albania
17:30 UTC+3	Laçi 41'; Muçi 81'	Report		Stadium: Arena Kombëtare; Attendance: 17,232; Referee: Mervan Bejtullahu (Kosovo)

16 November UEFA Euro 2024 qualifying	Bulgaria	2–2	Hungary	Sofia, Bulgaria
21:45 UTC+2	Delev 24'; Despodov 79' (pen.)	Report	Ádám 10'; A. Petkov 90+7' (o.g.)	Stadium: Vasil Levski National Stadium; Attendance: 230; Referee: Daniel Stefański (Poland)

19 November UEFA Euro 2024 qualifying	Serbia	2–2	Bulgaria	Leskovac, Serbia
16:00 UTC+2	Veljković 17'; Babić 82'	Report	Rusev 59'; Despodov 69'	Stadium: Dubočica Stadium; Attendance: 7,325; Referee: Erik Lambrechts (Belgium)

=== 2024 ===
22 March 2024 FIFA Series	Tanzania	0–1	Bulgaria	Baku, Azerbaijan
17:00 UTC+4		Report	Despodov 52'	Stadium: Dalga Arena; Attendance: 154; Referee: Aliyar Aghayev (Azerbaijan)

25 March 2024 FIFA Series	Azerbaijan	1–1	Bulgaria	Baku, Azerbaijan
20:00 UTC+4	Qurbanlı 87'	Report	Krastev 59'	Stadium: Tofiq Bahramov Republican Stadium; Attendance: 3,220; Referee: Kristo Tohver (Estonia)

4 June Friendly	Romania	0–0	Bulgaria	Bucharest, Romania
21:30 UTC+3		Report		Stadium: Steaua Stadium; Attendance: 19,024; Referee: Atilla Karaoğlan (Turkey)

8 June Friendly	Slovenia	1–1	Bulgaria	Ljubljana, Slovenia
15:00 UTC+2	Šporar 14'	Report	Despodov 4' (pen.)	Stadium: Stožice Stadium; Attendance: 11,037; Referee: Arda Kardeşler (Turkey)

5 September UEFA Nations League	Belarus	0–0	Bulgaria	Zalaegerszeg, Hungary (Note: Due to the Belarusian involvement in the Russian invasion of Ukraine, Belarus are required to play their home matches at neutral venues, and behind closed doors, until further notice.)
20:45 UTC+2		Report		Stadium: ZTE Arena; Attendance: 0 (behind closed doors); Referee: Ovidiu Hațegan (Romania)

8 September UEFA Nations League	Bulgaria	1–0	Northern Ireland	Plovdiv, Bulgaria
19:00 UTC+3	Despodov 40'	Report		Stadium: Hristo Botev Stadium; Attendance: 14,300; Referee: Tasos Sidiropoulos (Greece)

12 October UEFA Nations League	Bulgaria	0–0	Luxembourg	Plovdiv, Bulgaria
19:00 UTC+3		Report		Stadium: Hristo Botev Stadium; Attendance: 15,800; Referee: David Šmajc (Slovenia)

15 October UEFA Nations League	Northern Ireland	5–0	Bulgaria	Belfast, Northern Ireland
19:45 UTC+1	Price 15', 29', 81'; Mitov 32' (o.g.); Magennis 89'	Report		Stadium: Windsor Park; Attendance: 17,891; Referee: Jérôme Brisard (France)

15 November UEFA Nations League	Luxembourg	0–1	Bulgaria	Luxembourg City, Luxembourg
20:45 UTC+1		Report	Kraev 23'	Stadium: Stade de Luxembourg; Attendance: 8,307; Referee: Juri Frischer (Estonia)

18 November UEFA Nations League	Bulgaria	1–1	Belarus	Sofia, Bulgaria
21:45 UTC+2	Panayotov 12'	Report	Kavalyow 70'	Stadium: Vasil Levski National Stadium; Attendance: 2,200; Referee: Allard Lindhout (Netherlands)

=== 2025 ===
20 March UEFA Nations League promotion PO	Bulgaria	1–2	Republic of Ireland	Plovdiv, Bulgaria
21:45 UTC+2	M. Petkov 6'	Report	Azaz 21'; Doherty 42'	Stadium: Hristo Botev Stadium; Attendance: 7,835; Referee: Benoît Bastien (France)

23 March UEFA Nations League promotion PO	Republic of Ireland	2–1 (4–2 agg.)	Bulgaria	Dublin, Republic of Ireland
19:45 UTC+0	Ferguson 63'; Idah 84'	Report	Antov 30'	Stadium: Aviva Stadium; Attendance: 40,156; Referee: Halil Umut Meler (Turkey)

6 June Friendly	Bulgaria	2–2	Cyprus	Plovdiv, Bulgaria
19:00 UTC+3	Kolev 27', 61' (pen.)	Report	Koutsakos 42'; Laifis 86'	Stadium: Hristo Botev Stadium; Attendance: 600; Referee: Igor Stojchevski (North Macedonia)

10 June Friendly	Greece	4–0	Bulgaria	Heraklion, Greece
21:45 UTC+3	Pelkas 51'; Ioannidis 66'; Tzolis 74'; Konstantelias 89'	Report		Stadium: Pankritio Stadium; Attendance: 17,483; Referee: Nathan Verboomen (Belgium)

4 September 2026 FIFA World Cup qualification	Bulgaria	0–3	Spain	Sofia, Bulgaria
21:45 UTC+3		Report	Oyarzabal 5'; Cucurella 30'; Merino 38'	Stadium: Vasil Levski National Stadium; Attendance: 40,582; Referee: Srđan Jovanović (Serbia)

7 September 2026 FIFA World Cup qualification	Georgia	3–0	Bulgaria	Tbilisi, Georgia
17:00 UTC+4	Kvaratskhelia 30'; N. Gagnidze 44'; Mikautadze 65'	Report		Stadium: Boris Paichadze Dinamo Arena; Attendance: 44,077; Referee: Glenn Nyberg (Sweden)

11 October 2026 FIFA World Cup qualification	Bulgaria	1–6	Turkey	Sofia, Bulgaria
21:45 UTC+3	Kirilov 13'	Report	Güler 11'; Popov 49' (o.g.); Yıldız 51', 56'; Çelik 65'; Kahveci 90+3'	Stadium: Vasil Levski National Stadium; Attendance: 10,059; Referee: Luís Godinho (Portugal)

14 October 2026 FIFA World Cup qualification	Spain	4–0	Bulgaria	Valladolid, Spain
20:45 UTC+2	Merino 35', 57'; Chernev 79' (o.g.); Oyarzabal 90+2' (pen.)	Report		Stadium: José Zorrilla Stadium; Attendance: 24,526; Referee: Willy Delajod (France)

15 November 2026 FIFA World Cup qualification	Turkey	2–0	Bulgaria	Bursa, Turkey
20:00 UTC+3	Çalhanoğlu 18' (pen.); Chernev 83' (o.g.)	Report		Stadium: Centennial Atatürk Stadium; Attendance: 42,756; Referee: Nick Walsh (Scotland)

18 November 2026 FIFA World Cup qualification	Bulgaria	2–1	Georgia	Sofia, Bulgaria
21:45 UTC+2	Rusev 10'; Krastev 24'	Report	Lochoshvili 88'	Stadium: Vasil Levski National Stadium; Attendance: 1,980; Referee: Jakob Kehlet (Denmark)

=== 2026 ===
27 March 2026 FIFA Series	Solomon Islands	2–10	Bulgaria	Jakarta, Indonesia
15:30 UTC+7	Lea'i 29' (pen.), 70'	Report	M. Petkov 5', 45+2'; Yordanov 13' (pen.); Krastev 39', 44'; Nikolov 53', 81', 90+3'; Rusev 63' (pen.); Balov 65'	Stadium: Gelora Bung Karno Stadium; Attendance: 2,248; Referee: Naufal Adya Fairuski (Indonesia)

31 March 2026 FIFA Series	Indonesia	0–1	Bulgaria	Jakarta, Indonesia
20:00 UTC+7		Report	M. Petkov 38' (pen.)	Stadium: Gelora Bung Karno Stadium; Attendance: 24,174; Referee: Nazmi Nasaruddin (Malaysia)

1 June Friendly	Bulgaria	0–1	Montenegro	Plovdiv, Bulgaria
19:00 UTC+3		Report	Sekulić 68'	Stadium: Hristo Botev Stadium; Attendance: 2,323; Referee: Ioannis Papadopoulos (Greece)

5 June Friendly	Moldova	2–2	Bulgaria	Chișinău, Moldova
20:00 UTC+3	Bogaciuc 60'; Baboglo 85'	Report	Rusev 23'; M. Petkov 76'	Stadium: Zimbru Stadium; Attendance: 3,613; Referee: Tural Qurbanov (Azerbaijan)

26 September UEFA Nations League	Bulgaria	1–2	Luxembourg	Plovdiv, Bulgaria
19:00 UTC+3	Chandarov 18'	Report	Barreiro 37'; V. Thill 65'	Stadium: Hristo Botev Stadium; Attendance: 4,300; Referee: Sander van der Eijk (Netherlands)

29 September UEFA Nations League	Bulgaria	0–0	Estonia	Plovdiv, Bulgaria
21:45 UTC+3		Report		Stadium: Hristo Botev Stadium; Attendance: 960; Referee: Goga Kikacheishvili (Georgia)

3 October UEFA Nations League	Iceland	3–0	Bulgaria	Reykjavík, Iceland
16:00 UTC+0	Óskarsson 37', 60'; Ellertsson 90'	Report		Stadium: Laugardalsvöllur; Attendance: 5,069; Referee: Balázs Berke (Hungary)

6 October UEFA Nations League	Luxembourg	0–2	Bulgaria	Luxembourg City, Luxembourg
20:45 UTC+2		Report	Balov 19'; Iliev 34'	Stadium: Stade de Luxembourg; Attendance: 8,027; Referee: Andris Treimanis (Latvia)

13 November UEFA Nations League	Bulgaria	0–5	Iceland	Plovdiv, Bulgaria
21:45 UTC+2		Report	Guðjohnsen 17' (pen.), 68', 79'; Óskarsson 21'; Tsenov 52' (o.g.)	Stadium: Hristo Botev Stadium; Attendance: 1,150; Referee: Florian Badstübner (Germany)

15 November UEFA Nations League	Estonia	2–1	Bulgaria	Tallinn, Estonia
19:00 UTC+2	Kristal 8'; Palumets 60'	Report	Kovachev 45+1'	Stadium: Lilleküla Stadium; Attendance: 8,006; Referee: Nenad Minaković (Serbia)

== Forthcoming fixtures ==
The following matches are scheduled:
