= Spain national football team results (2020–present) =

These are all the matches played by the Spain national football team between 2020 and 2029:

== Meaning ==
	Meaning
W.C.	FIFA World Cup
EURO	UEFA European Championship
U.N.L.	UEFA Nations League
Q	Qualification rounds
PO	Play-off round
GS	Group stage
R32	Round of 32
R16	Round of 16
QF	Quarter-finals
SF	Semi-finals
3rd PO	Third place match
F	Final

== Results ==
=== 2020 ===
8 matches played:

26 March (Note: The Spain v Germany match, originally scheduled for 26 March 2020, 21:00 at the Wanda Metropolitano, Madrid was postponed on 15 March due to the COVID-19 pandemic. The match was later rescheduled to June 2020.) Friendly	Spain	Cancelled	Germany	Madrid, Spain
				Stadium: Wanda Metropolitano

5 June Friendly	Spain	Cancelled	Portugal	Madrid, Spain
				Stadium: Wanda Metropolitano

3 September 2020–21 UNL GS	Germany	1–1	Spain	Stuttgart, Germany
20:45 CEST	Werner 51'	Report	Gayà 90+6'	Stadium: Mercedes-Benz Arena; Attendance: 0 (Note: Due to the COVID-19 pandemic in Europe, all matches scheduled for September 2020 were played behind closed doors.); Referee: Daniele Orsato (Italy)

6 September 2020–21 UNL GS	Spain	4–0	Ukraine	Madrid, Spain
20:45 CEST	Ramos 3' (pen.), 29'; Fati 32'; F. Torres 84'	Report		Stadium: Alfredo di Stéfano; Attendance: 0 Referee: Benoît Bastien (France)

7 October Friendly	Portugal	0–0	Spain	Lisbon, Portugal
19:45 WEST		Report		Stadium: Estádio José Alvalade; Attendance: 2,500; Referee: Paolo Valeri (Italy)

10 October 2020–21 UNL GS	Spain	1–0	Switzerland	Madrid, Spain
20:45 CEST	Oyarzabal 14'	Report		Stadium: Alfredo Di Stefano Stadium; Attendance: 0 (Note: Due to the COVID-19 pandemic in Spain, Spain played their home match behind closed doors.); Referee: Ali Palabıyık (Turkey)

13 October 2020–21 UNL GS	Ukraine	1–0	Spain	Kyiv, Ukraine
20:45 CEST	Tsyhankov 76'	Report		Stadium: Olimpiyskiy National Sports Complex; Attendance: 10,495; Referee: Paweł Gil (Poland)

11 November (Note: The Netherlands v Spain match, originally scheduled for 29 March 2020, 21:00 at the Johan Cruyff Arena, Amsterdam was postponed on 17 March due to the COVID-19 pandemic in Europe. The match was later rescheduled to November 2020.) Friendly	Netherlands	1–1	Spain	Amsterdam, Netherlands
20:45 CET	Van de Beek 47'	Report	Canales 19'	Stadium: Johan Cruyff Arena; Attendance: 0 Referee: Davide Massa (Italy)

14 November 2020–21 UNL GS	Switzerland	1–1	Spain	Basel, Switzerland
20:45 CET	Freuler 26'	Report	Gerard 89'	Stadium: St. Jakob-Park; Attendance: 0 Referee: Willie Collum (Scotland)

17 November 2020–21 UNL GS	Spain	6–0	Germany	Seville, Spain
20:45 CET	Morata 17'; F. Torres 33', 55', 71'; Rodri 38'; Oyarzabal 89'	Report		Stadium: Estadio de La Cartuja; Attendance: 0 Referee: Andreas Ekberg (Sweden)

=== 2021 ===
18 matches played:

25 March 2022 World Cup Q	Spain	1–1	Greece	Granada, Spain
20:45 CET	Morata 33'	Report	Bakasetas 57' (pen.)	Stadium: Nuevo Los Cármenes; Attendance: 0 Referee: Marco Guida (Italy)

28 March 2022 World Cup Q	Georgia	1–2	Spain	Tbilisi, Georgia
18:00 CEST	Kvaratskhelia 44'	Report	F. Torres 56'; Olmo 90+2'	Stadium: Boris Paichadze Dinamo Arena; Attendance: 0 Referee: Radu Petrescu (Romania)

31 March 2022 World Cup Q	Spain	3–1	Kosovo	Seville, Spain
20:45 CEST	Olmo 34'; F. Torres 36'; Moreno 75'	Report	Halimi 70'	Stadium: La Cartuja; Attendance: 0 Referee: Jakob Kehlet (Denmark)

4 June Friendly	Spain	0–0	Portugal	Madrid, Spain
19:30 CEST		Report		Stadium: Wanda Metropolitano; Attendance: 14,743; Referee: Craig Pawson (England)

8 June (Note: The Spain v Lithuania friendly match scheduled for 8 June 2021 was cancelled on 6 June as a precaution after Sergio Busquets returned a positive test result for COVID-19.) Friendly	Spain	4–0	Lithuania	Leganés, Spain
19:45 CEST	Guillamón 3'; Brahim 24'; Miranda 54'; Puado 73'	Report		Stadium: Estadio Municipal de Butarque; Attendance: 903; Referee: Willy Delajod (France)

14 June Euro 2020 GS	Spain	0–0	Sweden	Seville, Spain
21:00 CEST		Report	Lustig (yellow card) 55'	Stadium: La Cartuja; Attendance: 10,559; Referee: Slavko Vinčić (Slovenia)

19 June Euro 2020 GS	Spain	1–1	Poland	Seville, Spain
21:00 CEST	Morata 25'; P. Torres (yellow card) 81'; Rodri (yellow card) 90+5'	Report	Klich (yellow card) 36'; Lewandowski 54', (yellow card) 90+3'; Moder (yellow card) 57'; Jóźwiak (yellow card) 59'	Stadium: La Cartuja; Attendance: 11,732; Referee: Daniele Orsato (Italy)

23 June Euro 2020 GS	Slovakia	0–5	Spain	Seville, Spain
18:00 CEST	Duda (yellow card) 12'; Škriniar (yellow card) 90+4'	Report	Dúbravka 30' (o.g.); Busquets (yellow card) 40'; Laporte 45+3'; Sarabia 56'; Alba (yellow card) 60'; F. Torres 67'; Kucka 71' (o.g.)	Stadium: La Cartuja; Attendance: 11,204; Referee: Björn Kuipers (Netherlands)

28 June Euro 2020 R16	Croatia	3–5 (a.e.t.)	Spain	Copenhagen, Denmark
18:00 CEST	Pedri 20' (o.g.); Brozović (yellow card) 73'; Ćaleta-Car (yellow card) 84'; Oršić 85'; Pašalić 90+2'	Report	Sarabia 38'; Azpilicueta 57'; F. Torres 77'; Morata 100'; Oyarzabal 103'	Stadium: Parken Stadium; Attendance: 22,771; Referee: Cüneyt Çakır (Turkey)

2 July Euro 2020 QF	Switzerland	1–1 (a.e.t.) (1–3 p)	Spain	Saint Petersburg, Russia
18:00 CEST	Widmer (yellow card) 67'; Shaqiri 68'; Freuler (red card) 77'; Gavranović (yellow card) 120+1'	Report	Zakaria 8' (o.g.); Laporte (yellow card) 90+3'	Stadium: Krestovsky Stadium; Attendance: 24,764; Referee: Michael Oliver (England)
	Penalties
	Gavranović (penalty scored); Schär (penalty missed); Akanji (penalty missed); Vargas (penalty missed)		(penalty missed) Busquets; (penalty scored) Olmo; (penalty missed) Rodri; (penalty scored) Gerard; (penalty scored) Oyarzabal

6 July Euro 2020 SF	Italy	1–1 (a.e.t.) (4–2 p)	Spain	London, England
21:00 CEST	Chiesa 60'; Tolói (yellow card) 97'; Bonucci (yellow card) 118'	Report	Busquets (yellow card) 51'; Morata 80'	Stadium: Wembley Stadium; Attendance: 57,811; Referee: Felix Brych (Germany)
	Penalties
	Locatelli (penalty missed); Belotti (penalty scored); Bonucci (penalty scored); Bernardeschi (penalty scored); Jorginho (penalty scored)		(penalty missed) Olmo; (penalty scored) Gerard; (penalty scored) Thiago; (penalty missed) Morata

2 September 2022 World Cup Q	Sweden	2–1	Spain	Solna, Sweden
20:45 CEST	Isak 6'; Claesson 57'	Report	Soler 5'	Stadium: Friends Arena; Attendance: 16,901; Referee: Anthony Taylor (England)

5 September 2022 World Cup Q	Spain	4–0	Georgia	Badajoz, Spain
20:45 CEST	Gayà 14'; Soler 25'; F. Torres 41'; Sarabia 63'	Report		Stadium: Nuevo Vivero; Attendance: 8,444; Referee: Tiago Martins (Portugal)

8 September 2022 World Cup Q	Kosovo	0–2	Spain	Pristina, Kosovo
20:45 CEST		Report	Fornals 32'; F. Torres 90'	Stadium: Fadil Vokrri Stadium; Attendance: 1,200; Referee: Bobby Madden (Scotland)

6 October 2020-21 UNL SF	Italy	1–2	Spain	Milan, Italy
20:45 CEST	Bonucci (yellow card) 30' (yellow-red card) 42'; Locatelli (yellow card) 82'; Pellegrini 83'	Report	F. Torres 17', 45+2'; Azpilicueta (yellow card) 45'; Sarabia (yellow card) 65'; Pino (yellow card) 71'; Oyarzabal (yellow card) 89'	Stadium: San Siro; Attendance: 33,524; Referee: Sergei Karasev (Russia)

10 October 2020-21 UNL F	Spain	1–2	France	Milan, Italy
20:45 CEST	Oyarzabal 64'; Laporte (yellow card) 86'	Report	Pogba (yellow card) 46'; Koundé (yellow card) 55'; Benzema 66'; Mbappé 80', (yellow card) 90'	Stadium: San Siro; Attendance: 31,511; Referee: Anthony Taylor (England)

11 November 2022 World Cup Q	Greece	0–1	Spain	Athens, Greece
20:45 CET		Report	Sarabia 26' (pen.)	Stadium: Olympic Stadium; Attendance: 7,825; Referee: Szymon Marciniak (Poland)

14 November 2022 World Cup Q	Spain	1–0	Sweden	Seville, Spain
20:45 CET	Morata 86'	Report		Stadium: La Cartuja; Attendance: 51,844; Referee: Felix Brych (Germany)

=== 2022 ===
13 matches played:

26 March Friendly	Spain	2–1	Albania	Cornellà de Llobregat, Spain
19:45 CET	F. Torres 75'; Olmo 90'	Report	Uzuni 85'	Stadium: RCDE Stadium; Attendance: 35,444; Referee: Trustin Farrugia Cann (Malta)

29 March Friendly	Spain	5–0	Iceland	A Coruña, Spain
19:45 CEST	Morata 36', 39' (pen.); Pino 47'; Sarabia 61', 72'	Report		Stadium: Riazor; Attendance: 28,117; Referee: Horațiu Feșnic (Romania)

2 June 2022–23 UNL GS	Spain	1–1	Portugal	Seville, Spain
20:45 CEST	Morata 25'	Report	Horta 82'	Stadium: Benito Villamarín; Attendance: 41,236; Referee: Michael Oliver (England)

5 June 2022–23 UNL GS	Czech Republic	2–2	Spain	Prague, Czech Republic
20:45 CEST	Pešek 4'; Kuchta 66'	Report	Gavi 45+3'; Martínez 90'	Stadium: Sinobo Stadium; Attendance: 18,245; Referee: François Letexier (France)

9 June 2022–23 UNL GS	Switzerland	0–1	Spain	Geneva, Switzerland
20:45 CEST		Report	Sarabia 13'	Stadium: Stade de Genève; Attendance: 25,875; Referee: Serdar Gözübüyük (Netherlands)

12 June 2022–23 UNL GS	Spain	2–0	Czech Republic	Málaga, Spain
20:45 CEST	Soler 24'; Sarabia 75'	Report		Stadium: La Rosaleda; Attendance: 30,389; Referee: Cüneyt Çakır (Turkey)

24 September 2022–23 UNL GS	Spain	1–2	Switzerland	Zaragoza, Spain
20:45 CEST	Alba 51'	Report	Akanji 21'; Embolo 59'	Stadium: La Romareda; Attendance: 31,804; Referee: Clément Turpin (France)

27 September 2022–23 UNL GS	Portugal	0–1	Spain	Braga, Portugal
20:45 CEST		Report	Morata 88'	Stadium: Estádio Municipal; Attendance: 28,196; Referee: Daniele Orsato (Italy)

17 November Friendly	Jordan	1–3	Spain	Amman, Jordan
19:00 AST	Samir 90+2'	Report	Fati 13'; Gavi 56'; Williams 84'	Stadium: Amman International Stadium; Attendance: 20,000; Referee: Ahmed Al-Kaf (Oman)

23 November 2022 World Cup GS	Spain	7–0	Costa Rica	Doha, Qatar
19:00 AST	Olmo 11'; Asensio 21'; Torres 31' (pen.), 54'; Gavi 74'; Soler 90'; Morata 90+2'	Report		Stadium: Al Thumama Stadium; Attendance: 40,013; Referee: Mohammed Abdulla Hassan Mohamed (United Arab Emirates)

27 November 2022 World Cup GS	Spain	1–1	Germany	Al Khor, Qatar
22:00 AST	Morata 62'	Report	Füllkrug 83'	Stadium: Al Bayt Stadium; Attendance: 68,895; Referee: Danny Makkelie (Netherlands)

1 December 2022 World Cup GS	Japan	2–1	Spain	Al Rayyan, Qatar
22:00 AST	Dōan 48'; Tanaka 51'	Report	Morata 11'	Stadium: Khalifa International Stadium; Attendance: 44,851; Referee: Victor Gomes (South Africa)

6 December 2022 World Cup R16	Morocco	0–0 (a.e.t.) (3–0 p)	Spain	Al Rayyan, Qatar
18:00 AST		Report		Stadium: Education City Stadium; Attendance: 44,667; Referee: Fernando Rapallini (Argentina)
	Penalties
	Sabiri (penalty scored); Ziyech (penalty scored); Benoun (penalty missed); Hakimi (penalty scored)		(penalty missed) Sarabia; (penalty missed) Soler; (penalty missed) Busquets

=== 2023 ===
10 matches played:

25 March Euro 2024 Q	Spain	3–0	Norway	Málaga, Spain
20:45 CEST	Olmo 13'; Joselu 84', 85'	Report		Stadium: La Rosaleda; Attendance: 29,214; Referee: Benoît Bastien (France)

28 March Euro 2024 Q	Scotland	2–0	Spain	Glasgow, Scotland
20:45 CEST	McTominay 7', 51'	Report		Stadium: Hampden Park; Attendance: 47,976; Referee: Sandro Schärer (Switzerland)

15 June 2022-23 UNL SF	Spain	2–1	Italy	Enschede, Netherlands
20:45 CEST	Pino 3'; Joselu 88'	Report	Immobile 11' (pen.)	Stadium: De Grolsch Veste; Attendance: 24,558; Referee: Slavko Vinčić (Slovenia)

18 June 2022-23 UNL F	Croatia	0–0 (a.e.t.) (4–5 p)	Spain	Rotterdam, Netherlands
20:45 CEST		Report		Stadium: De Kuip; Attendance: 41,110; Referee: Felix Zwayer (Germany)
	Penalties
	Vlašić (penalty scored); Brozović (penalty scored); Modrić (penalty scored); Majer (penalty missed); Perišić (penalty scored); Petković (penalty missed)		(penalty scored) Joselu; (penalty scored) Rodri; (penalty scored) Merino; (penalty scored) Asensio; (penalty missed) Laporte; (penalty scored) Carvajal

8 September Euro 2024 Q	Georgia	1–7	Spain	Tbilisi, Georgia
18:00 CEST	Chakvetadze 49'	Report	Morata 22', 40', 66'; Kvirkvelia 28' (o.g.); Olmo 38'; Williams 68'; Yamal 74'	Stadium: Boris Paichadze Dinamo Arena; Attendance: 51,694; Referee: Daniel Siebert (Germany)

11 September Euro 2024 Q	Spain	6–0	Cyprus	Santander, Spain
20:45 CEST	Gavi 18'; Merino 33'; Joselu 70'; Torres 73', 83'; Baena 77'	Report		Stadium: El Sardinero; Attendance: 17,311; Referee: Simone Sozza (Italy)

12 October Euro 2024 Q	Spain	2–0	Scotland	Seville, Spain
20:45 CEST	Morata 73'; Sancet 86'	Report		Stadium: La Cartuja; Attendance: 45,623; Referee: Serdar Gözübüyük (Netherlands)

15 October Euro 2024 Q	Norway	0–1	Spain	Oslo, Norway
20:45 CEST		Report	Gavi 49'	Stadium: Ullevaal Stadion; Attendance: 25,885; Referee: Tobias Stieler (Germany)

16 November Euro 2024 Q	Cyprus	1–3	Spain	Limassol, Cyprus
18:00 CET (UTC+01:00)	Pileas 75'	Report	Yamal 5'; Oyarzabal 22'; Joselu 28'	Stadium: Alphamega Stadium; Attendance: 9,667; Referee: Mykola Balakin (Ukraine)

19 November Euro 2024 Q	Spain	3–1	Georgia	Valladolid, Spain
20:45 CET (UTC+01:00)	Le Normand 4'; Torres 55'; Lochoshvili 72' (o.g.)	Report	Kvaratskhelia 10'	Stadium: José Zorrilla; Attendance: 24,146; Referee: Ovidiu Hațegan (Romania)

=== 2024 ===
17 matches played:

22 March Friendly	Spain	0–1	Colombia	London, England
20:30 CEST		Report	Muñoz 61'	Stadium: London Stadium; Attendance: 43,267; Referee: Michael Oliver (England)

26 March Friendly	Spain	3–3	Brazil	Madrid, Spain
20:30 CEST	Rodri 12' (pen.), 87' (pen.); Olmo 36'	Report	Rodrygo 40'; Endrick 50'; Paquetá 90+6' (pen.)	Stadium: Santiago Bernabéu; Attendance: 71,465; Referee: António Nobre (Portugal)

5 June Friendly	Spain	5–0	Andorra	Badajoz, Spain
21:30 CET (UTC+01:00)	Pérez 24'; Oyarzabal 53', 66', 73'; F. Torres 81'	Report		Stadium: Nuevo Vivero; Attendance: 14,300; Referee: Gustavo Correia (Portugal)

8 June Friendly	Spain	5–1	Northern Ireland	Palma, Spain
21:30 CET (UTC+01:00)	Pedri 12', 29'; Morata 18'; Fabián 35'; Oyarzabal 60'	Report	Ballard 2'	Stadium: Estadi Mallorca Son Moix; Attendance: 18,300; Referee: Bastien Dechepy (France)

15 June Euro 2024 GS	Spain	3–0	Croatia	Berlin, Germany
18:00 UTC+2	Morata 29'; Ruiz 32'; Carvajal 45+2'	Report	Petković (penalty missed) 80'	Stadium: Olympiastadion; Attendance: 68,844; Referee: Michael Oliver (England)

20 June Euro 2024 GS	Spain	1–0	Italy	Gelsenkirchen, Germany
21:00 UTC+2	Calafiori 55' (o.g.)	Report		Stadium: Arena AufSchalke; Attendance: 49,528; Referee: Slavko Vinčić (Slovenia)

24 June Euro 2024 GS	Albania	0–1	Spain	Düsseldorf, Germany
21:00 UTC+2		Report	Torres 13'	Stadium: Merkur Spiel-Arena; Attendance: 46,586; Referee: Glenn Nyberg (Sweden)

30 June Euro 2024 R16	Spain	4–1	Georgia	Cologne, Germany
21:00 UTC+2	Rodri 39'; Fabián 51'; Williams 75'; Olmo 83'	Report	Le Normand 18' (o.g.)	Stadium: RheinEnergieStadion; Attendance: 42,233; Referee: François Letexier (France)

5 July Euro 2024 QF	Spain	2–1 (a.e.t.)	Germany	Stuttgart, Germany
18:00 UTC+2	Olmo 51'; Merino 119'; Carvajal (yellow card) 100' (yellow-red card) 120+6'	Report	Wirtz 89'	Stadium: MHPArena; Attendance: 54,000; Referee: Anthony Taylor (England)

9 July Euro 2024 SF	Spain	2–1	France	Munich, Germany
21:00 UTC+2	Yamal 21'; Olmo 25'	Report	Muani 8'	Stadium: Allianz Arena; Attendance: 62,042; Referee: Slavko Vinčić (Slovenia)

14 July Euro 2024 F	Spain	2–1	England	Berlin, Germany
21:00 UTC+2	Williams 47'; Oyarzabal 86'	Report	Palmer 73'	Stadium: Olympiastadion; Attendance: 65,600; Referee: François Letexier (France)

5 September 2024–25 UNL GS	Serbia	0–0	Spain	Belgrade, Serbia
20:45 CEST		Report		Stadium: Rajko Mitić Stadium; Attendance: 29,981; Referee: Serdar Gözübüyük (Netherlands)

8 September 2024–25 UNL GS	Switzerland	1–4	Spain	Geneva, Switzerland
20:45 CEST	Amdouni 41'	Report	Joselu 4'; Fabián 13', 77'; Le Normand (red card) 20'; F. Torres 80'	Stadium: Stade de Genève; Attendance: 26,265; Referee: Irfan Peljto (Bosnia and Herzegovina)

12 October 2024–25 UNL GS	Spain	1–0	Denmark	Murcia, Spain
20:45 CEST	Zubimendi 79'	Report		Stadium: Estadio Nueva Condomina; Attendance: 29,870; Referee: Ivan Kružliak (Slovakia)

15 October 2024–25 UNL GS	Spain	3–0	Serbia	Córdoba, Spain
20:45 CEST	Laporte 5'; Morata 65'; Baena 77'	Report	Pavlović (red card) 76'	Stadium: Estadio Nuevo Arcángel; Attendance: 20,345; Referee: Daniel Stefański (Poland)

15 November 2024–25 UNL GS	Denmark	1–2	Spain	Copenhagen, Denmark
20:45 CEST	Isaksen 84'	Report	Oyarzabal 15'; Pérez 58'	Stadium: Parken Stadium; Attendance: 36,985; Referee: Rade Obrenović (Slovenia)

18 November 2024–25 UNL GS	Spain	3–2	Switzerland	Santa Cruz de Tenerife, Spain
20:45 CEST	Pedri (penalty missed) 32'; Pino 32'; Gil 68'; Zaragoza 90+3' (pen.)	Report	Monteiro 63'; Zeqiri 85' (pen.)	Stadium: Estadio Heliodoro Rodríguez López; Attendance: 7,295; Referee: Bastian Dankert (Germany)

=== 2025 ===
10 matches played:

20 March 2024–25 UNL QF	Netherlands	2–2	Spain	Rotterdam, Netherlands
20:45 CEST	Gakpo 28'; Reijnders 46'; Hato (red card) 81'	Report	Williams 9'; Merino 90+3'	Stadium: De Kuip; Attendance: 42,003; Referee: Glenn Nyberg (Sweden)

23 March 2024–25 UNL QF	Spain	3–3 (5–5 agg.) (5–4 p)	Netherlands	Valencia, Spain
20:45 CEST	Oyarzabal 8' (pen.), 67'; Yamal 103'	Report	Depay 54' (pen.); Maatsen 79'; Simons 109' (pen.)	Stadium: Mestalla Stadium; Attendance: 48,082; Referee: Clément Turpin (France)
	Penalties
	Merino (penalty scored); Torres (penalty scored); García (penalty scored); Yamal (penalty missed); Baena (penalty scored); Pedri (penalty scored)		(penalty scored) van Dijk; (penalty scored) Koopmeiners; (penalty scored) Simons; (penalty missed) Lang; (penalty scored) Taylor; (penalty missed) Malen

5 June 2024–25 UNL SF	Spain	5–4	France	Stuttgart, Germany
21:00 CEST	Williams 22'; Merino 25'; Yamal 54' (pen.), 67'; Pedri 55'	Report	Mbappé 59' (pen.); Cherki 79'; Vivian 84' (o.g.); Kolo Muani 90+3'	Stadium: MHPArena; Attendance: 51,724; Referee: Michael Oliver (England)

8 June 2024–25 UNL F	Portugal	2–2 (a.e.t.) (5–3 p)	Spain	Munich, Germany
21:00 CEST	Mendes 26'; Ronaldo 61'	Report	Zubimendi 21'; Oyarzabal 45'	Stadium: Allianz Arena; Attendance: 65,852; Referee: Sandro Schärer (Switzerland)
	Penalties
	Ramos (penalty scored); Vitinha (penalty scored); Fernandes (penalty scored); Mendes (penalty scored); Neves (penalty scored)		(penalty scored) Merino; (penalty scored) Baena; (penalty scored) Isco; (penalty missed) Morata

4 September 2026 World Cup Q	Bulgaria	0–3	Spain	Sofia, Bulgaria
20:45 CEST		Report	Oyarzabal 5'; Cucurella 30'; Merino 38'	Stadium: Vasil Levski National Stadium; Attendance: 40,582; Referee: Srđan Jovanović (Serbia)

7 September 2026 World Cup Q	Turkey	0–6	Spain	Konya, Turkey
20:45 CEST		Report	Pedri 6', 62'; Merino 22', 45+1', 57'; Torres 53'	Stadium: Konya Metropolitan Municipality Stadium; Attendance: 32,059; Referee: Michael Oliver (England)

11 October 2026 World Cup Q	Spain	2–0	Georgia	Elche, Spain
20:45 CEST	Pino 24'; Oyarzabal 64'	Report		Stadium: Estadio Martínez Valero; Attendance: 28,661; Referee: Manfredas Lukjančukas (Lithuania)

14 October 2026 World Cup Q	Spain	4–0	Bulgaria	Valladolid, Spain
20:45 CEST	Merino 35', 57'; Chernev 64' (o.g.); Oyarzabal 90+2' (pen.)	Report		Stadium: José Zorrilla Stadium; Attendance: 24,526; Referee: Willy Delajod (France)

15 November 2026 World Cup Q	Georgia	0–4	Spain	Tbilisi, Georgia
21:00 GET		Report	Oyarzabal 11' (pen.), 63'; Zubimendi 22'; Torres 35'	Stadium: Boris Paichadze Dinamo Arena; Attendance: 44,314; Referee: Benoît Bastien (France)

18 November 2026 World Cup Q	Spain	2–2	Turkey	Seville, Spain
20:45 CET	Olmo 4'; Oyarzabal 62'	Report	Gül 42'; Özcan 54'	Stadium: Estadio de La Cartuja; Attendance: 30,812; Referee: Felix Zwayer (Germany)

=== 2026 ===
18 matches played (as of 15 November 2026):

27 March Friendly	Spain	3–0	Serbia	Villarreal, Spain
21:00 CET	Oyarzabal 16', 44'; Muñoz 72'	Report		Stadium: Estadio de la Ceramica; Attendance: 20,482; Referee: Luis Godinho (Portugal)

28 March 2026 Finalissima	Argentina	Cancelled	Spain	Lusail, Qatar
				Stadium: Lusail Stadium
Note: Cancelled due to the 2026 Iran war

31 March Friendly	Spain	0–0	Egypt	Cornellà de Llobregat, Spain (Note: The Egypt v Spain match, originally scheduled to be played at the Lusail Stadium, Lusail, was relocated to Spain due to the 2026 Iran war.)
21:00 CEST		Report		Stadium: RCDE Stadium; Attendance: 35,895; Referee: Georgi Kabakov (Bulgaria)

4 June Friendly	Spain	1–1	Iraq	A Coruña, Spain
21:00 CEST	Torres 16'	Report	Doski 27'	Stadium: Estadio Riazor; Attendance: 30,423; Referee: Florian Badstübner (Germany)

8 June Friendly	Peru	1–3	Spain	Puebla, Mexico
20:00 CST	Vélez 66'	Report	Oyarzabal 2'; Pedri 32'; Gallese 55' (o.g.)	Stadium: Estadio Cuauhtémoc; Attendance: 45,845; Referee: Fernando Hernández (Mexico)

15 June 2026 World Cup GS	Spain	0–0	Cape Verde	Atlanta, United States
12:00 EDT		Report		Stadium: Mercedes-Benz Stadium; Attendance: 67,640; Referee: Adham Makhadmeh (Jordan)

21 June 2026 World Cup GS	Spain	4–0	Saudi Arabia	Atlanta, United States
12:00 EDT	Yamal 10'; Oyarzabal 21', 24'; Al-Tambakti 49' (o.g.)	Report		Stadium: Mercedes-Benz Stadium; Attendance: 68,239; Referee: Raphael Claus (Brazil)

26 June 2026 World Cup GS	Uruguay	0–1	Spain	Zapopan, Mexico
18:00 MDT		Report	Baena 42'	Stadium: Estadio Akron; Attendance: 45,065; Referee: Ismail Elfath (United States)

2 July 2026 World Cup R32	Spain	3–0	Austria	Inglewood, United States
12:00 PDT	Oyarzabal 36', 89'; Porro 66'	Report		Stadium: SoFi Stadium; Attendance: 70,492; Referee: Glenn Nyberg (Sweden)

6 July 2026 World Cup R16	Portugal	0–1	Spain	Arlington, United States
18:00 CT		Report	Merino 90+1'	Stadium: AT&T Stadium; Attendance: 70,649; Referee: Anthony Taylor (England)

10 July 2026 World Cup QF	Spain	2–1	Belgium	Inglewood, United States
12:00 PT	Fabián 30'; Merino 88'	Report	De Ketelaere 41'	Stadium: Los Angeles Stadium; Attendance: 70,492; Referee: Michael Oliver (England)

14 July 2026 World Cup SF	France	0–2	Spain	Arlington, United States
15:00 CDT		Report	Oyarzabal 22' (pen.); Porro 58'	Stadium: Dallas Stadium; Attendance: 70,176; Referee: Iván Barton (El Salvador)

19 July 2026 World Cup F	Spain	1–0 (a.e.t.)	Argentina	East Rutherford, United States
15:00 EDT	Torres 106'	Report	Fernández (yellow card) 82' (yellow-red card) 90+3'	Stadium: MetLife Stadium; Attendance: 80,663; Referee: Slavko Vinčić (Slovenia)

26 September 2026–27 UNL GS	England	2–3	Spain	London, England
19:45 UTC+1	Gordon 36'; Kane 40', (penalty missed) 55'	Report	Yamal 2'; Baena 60'; Oyarzabal 74'	Stadium: Wembley Stadium; Attendance: 84,525; Referee: Davide Massa (Italy)

29 September 2026–27 UNL GS	Spain	4–1	Croatia	Seville, Spain
20:45 UTC+2	Yamal 2', 63'; Pubill 31'; Williams 89'	Report	Beljo 28'	Stadium: Ramón Sánchez-Pizjuán Stadium; Attendance: 40,294; Referee: Serdar Gözübüyük (Netherlands)

3 October 2026–27 UNL GS	Spain	3–1	Czech Republic	Oviedo, Spain
20:45 UTC+2	Yamal 6'; Rodri 35'; Merino 89'	Report	Sláma 69'	Stadium: Estadio Carlos Tartiere; Attendance: 28,515; Referee: Vassilis Fotias (Greece)

6 October 2026–27 UNL GS	Croatia	1–2	Spain	Split, Croatia
20:45 UTC+2	Perišić 17', (yellow card) 22' (yellow-red card) 79'	Report	Merino 61', 88'	Stadium: Stadion Poljud; Attendance: 32,690; Referee: Erik Lambrechts (Belgium)

12 November 2026–27 UNL GS	Czech Republic	0–2	Spain	Prague, Czech Republic
20:45 UTC+1	Krejčí (red card) 72'	Report	Baena 39' (pen.); Pubill 90+6'	Stadium: Fortuna Arena; Attendance: 18,193; Referee: Nikola Dabanović (Montenegro)

15 November 2026–27 UNL GS	Spain	2–3	England	Madrid, Spain
20:45 UTC+1	Oyarzabal 65' (pen.); Williams 75'	Report	Kane 45' (pen.); Konsa 53'; White 57'; Anderson (red card) 63'	Stadium: Metropolitano Stadium; Attendance: 63,788; Referee: Clément Turpin (France)
