= Nika Gagnidze =

Georgian association football player

Personal information
- Date of birth: 20 March 2001 (age 25)
- Place of birth: Gori, Georgia
- Height: 1.80 m (5 ft 11 in)
- Position: Midfielder

Team information
- Current team: Kolos Kovalivka
- Number: 20

Youth career
- 2017–2019: Dila

Senior career*
Years	Team	Apps	(Gls)
2018–2024	Dila	116	(21)
2022	→ Ümraniyespor (loan)	2	(0)
2024–	Kolos Kovalivka	47	(2)

International career^{‡}
2019–2020	Georgia U19	5	(0)
2021–2023	Georgia U21	10	(0)
2025–	Georgia	11	(1)
- * Club domestic league appearances and goals as of 3 June 2026 ‡ National team caps and goals as of 15:40, 18 November 2026 (UTC)

Nika Gagnidze (Georgian: ნიკა გაგნიძე; born 20 March 2001) is a Georgian footballer who plays as a midfielder for Ukrainian Premier League club Kolos Kovalivka and the Georgia national team.

== Professional career ==
A youth product of Dila since the age of 16, Gagnidze was promoted to their senior team in 2018 and became a mainstay in the squad. His performance was recognized during the 2021 season: Gagnidze was named Player of Phase 4 of the season, which comprised the last nine matches, and selected among best eleven players of the league.

On 15 March 2022, he extended his contract with Dila. On 20 July 2022, Gagnidze transferred to Ümraniyespor as they were newly promoted to the Süper Lig. He made his professional debut with Ümraniyespor in a 1–0 Süper Lig loss to Antalyaspor on 14 August 2022.

In December 2022, Gagnidze returned to Dila Gori as the team captain.

In April 2024, the Erovnuli Liga named Gagnidze the best player of part 1 of the season in which he scored once and provided five assists.

On 11 July 2024, Ukrainian club Kolos announced the signing of Gagnidze.

== International career ==
Gagnidze was a youth international for Georgia, having played for the Georgia U19s and U21s. As a U21 squad member, he was called up for the 2023 UEFA European Championship. After playing full time in a 2–0 win over Portugal, he sustained an injury in the next game against Netherlands, requiring treatment for more than six weeks.

In June 2025, Gagnidze was called up to the national team for a friendly tie against Faroe Islands. He played the match in full.

== Career statistics ==
=== Club ===
As of 24 May 2025

Appearances and goals by club, season and competition
Club	Season	League			National cup (Note: Includes Georgian Cup, Turkish Cup, Ukrainian Cup)		Continental		Other		Total	
Club	Season	Division	Apps	Goals	Apps	Goals	Apps	Goals	Apps	Goals	Apps	Goals
Dila Gori	2019	Erovnuli Liga	15	0	—		—		—		15	0
Dila Gori	2020	Erovnuli Liga	13	3	3	0	—		—		16	3
Dila Gori	2021	Erovnuli Liga	28	7	2	0	—		—		30	7
Dila Gori	2022	Erovnuli Liga	18	3	—		2 (Note: Appearances in UEFA Conference League)	0	—		22	3
Dila Gori	2023	Erovnuli Liga	27	6	1	0	—		—		21	6
Dila Gori	2024	Erovnuli Liga	15	2	—		—		—		15	2
Dila Gori	Total		116	21	6	0	2	0	0	0	124	21
Ümraniyespor (loan)	2022–23	Süper Lig	2	0	1	0	—		—		3	0
Kolos	2024–25	Ukrainian Premier League	22	2	1	0	—		—		23	2
Career total			140	23	8	0	2	0	0	0	150	23

=== International ===
Scores and results list Georgia's goal tally first, score column indicates score after each Gagnidze goal.

List of international goals scored by Nika Gagnidze
No.	Date	Venue	Opponent	Score	Result	Competition
1	7 September 2025	Boris Paichadze Dinamo Arena, Tbilisi, Georgia	Bulgaria	2–0	3–0	2026 FIFA World Cup qualification
