= UEFA Euro 2020 knockout stage =

Stage of the football championship competition

The knockout stage of UEFA Euro 2020 began on 26 June 2021 with the round of 16 and ended on 11 July 2021 with the final at Wembley Stadium in London, England.

Times listed are Central European Summer Time (UTC+2). If the venue is located in a different time zone, the local time is also given.

== Format ==
In the knockout stage, if a match was level at the end of 90 minutes of normal playing time, extra time was played (two periods of 15 minutes each), where each team was allowed to make a sixth substitution. If still tied after extra time, the match was decided by a penalty shoot-out to determine the winners.

UEFA set out the following schedule for the round of 16:

- Match 1: Winner Group B vs 3rd Group A/D/E/F
- Match 2: Winner Group A vs Runner-up Group C
- Match 3: Winner Group F vs 3rd Group A/B/C
- Match 4: Runner-up Group D vs Runner-up Group E
- Match 5: Winner Group E vs 3rd Group A/B/C/D
- Match 6: Winner Group D vs Runner-up Group F
- Match 7: Winner Group C vs 3rd Group D/E/F
- Match 8: Runner-up Group A vs Runner-up Group B

As with every tournament since UEFA Euro 1984, there was no third place play-off.

=== Combinations of matches in the round of 16 ===
The specific match-ups involving the third-placed teams depended on which four out of 15 possible combinations of best third-placed teams qualified for the round of 16:

Combination used according to the four qualified teams

Third-placed teams qualify from groups						1B vs	1C vs	1E vs	1F vs
A	B	C	D			3A	3D	3B	3C
A	B	C		E		3A	3E	3B	3C
A	B	C			F	3A	3F	3B	3C
A	B		D	E		3D	3E	3A	3B
A	B		D		F	3D	3F	3A	3B
A	B			E	F	3E	3F	3B	3A
A		C	D	E		3E	3D	3C	3A
A		C	D		F	3F	3D	3C	3A
A		C		E	F	3E	3F	3C	3A
A			D	E	F	3E	3F	3D	3A
	B	C	D	E		3E	3D	3B	3C
	B	C	D		F	3F	3D	3C	3B
	B	C		E	F	3F	3E	3C	3B
	B		D	E	F	3F	3E	3D	3B
		C	D	E	F	3F	3E	3D	3C

== Qualified teams ==
The top two placed teams from each of the six groups, along with the four best-placed third teams, qualified for the knockout stage.

Group	Winners	Runners-up	Third-placed teams (Best four qualified)
A	Italy	Wales	Switzerland
B	Belgium	Denmark	—N/a
C	Netherlands	Austria	Ukraine
D	England	Croatia	Czech Republic
E	Sweden	Spain	—N/a
F	France	Germany	Portugal

== Bracket ==
Round of 16
27 June 2021 – Seville
Belgium	1
Portugal	0
26 June 2021 – London
Italy (a.e.t.)	2
Austria	1
28 June 2021 – Bucharest
France	3 (4)
Switzerland (p)	3 (5)
28 June 2021 – Copenhagen
Croatia	3
Spain (a.e.t.)	5
29 June 2021 – Glasgow
Sweden	1
Ukraine (a.e.t.)	2
29 June 2021 – London
England	2
Germany	0
27 June 2021 – Budapest
Netherlands	0
Czech Republic	2
26 June 2021 – Amsterdam
Wales	0
Denmark	4

Quarter-finals
2 July 2021 – Munich
Belgium	1
Italy	2
2 July 2021 – Saint Petersburg
Switzerland	1 (1)
Spain (p)	1 (3)
3 July 2021 – Rome
Ukraine	0
England	4
3 July 2021 – Baku
Czech Republic	1
Denmark	2

Semi-finals
6 July 2021 – London
Italy (p)	1 (4)
Spain	1 (2)
7 July 2021 – London
England (a.e.t.)	2
Denmark	1

Final
11 July 2021 – London
Italy (p)	1 (3)
England	1 (2)

== Round of 16 ==
=== Wales vs Denmark ===
26 June 2021
18:00

Wales	0–4	Denmark
	Report	Dolberg 27', 48'; Mæhle 88'; Braithwaite 90+4'

Johan Cruyff Arena, Amsterdam
Attendance: 14,645
Referee: Daniel Siebert (Germany)

Wales	Denmark

GK	12	Danny Ward
RB	14	Connor Roberts		(substituted off) 40'
CB	6	Joe Rodon	(yellow card) 26'
CB	22	Chris Mepham
LB	4	Ben Davies
CM	16	Joe Morrell		(substituted off) 59'
CM	7	Joe Allen
RW	20	Daniel James		(substituted off) 78'
AM	10	Aaron Ramsey
LW	11	Gareth Bale (c)	(yellow card) 90+3'
CF	13	Kieffer Moore	(yellow card) 40'	(substituted off) 78'
Substitutions:
DF	3	Neco Williams		(substituted on) 40'
MF	8	Harry Wilson	(red card) 90'	(substituted on) 59'
FW	9	Tyler Roberts		(substituted on) 78'
MF	19	David Brooks	(yellow card) 80'	(substituted on) 78'
Manager:
Rob Page

GK	1	Kasper Schmeichel
CB	6	Andreas Christensen
CB	4	Simon Kjær (c)	(substituted off) 77'
CB	3	Jannik Vestergaard
RM	17	Jens Stryger Larsen	(substituted off) 77'
CM	23	Pierre-Emile Højbjerg
CM	8	Thomas Delaney	(substituted off) 60'
LM	5	Joakim Mæhle
RF	14	Mikkel Damsgaard	(substituted off) 60'
CF	12	Kasper Dolberg	(substituted off) 69'
LF	9	Martin Braithwaite
Substitutions:
MF	24	Mathias Jensen	(substituted on) 60'
MF	15	Christian Nørgaard	(substituted on) 60'
FW	21	Andreas Cornelius	(substituted on) 69'
DF	26	Nicolai Boilesen	(substituted on) 77'
DF	2	Joachim Andersen	(substituted on) 77'
Manager:
Kasper Hjulmand

Man of the Match:
Kasper Dolberg (Denmark)

Assistant referees:
Jan Seidel (Germany)
Rafael Foltyn (Germany)
Fourth official:
Ovidiu Hațegan (Romania)
Reserve assistant referee:
Sebastian Gheorghe (Romania)
Video assistant referee:
Bastian Dankert (Germany)
Assistant video assistant referees:
Christian Dingert (Germany)
Christian Gittelmann (Germany)
Marco Fritz (Germany)

=== Italy vs Austria ===
26 June 2021
21:00 (20:00 UTC+1)

Italy	2–1 (a.e.t.)	Austria
Chiesa 95'; Pessina 105'	Report	Kalajdžić 114'

Wembley Stadium, London
Attendance: 18,910
Referee: Anthony Taylor (England)

Italy	Austria

GK	21	Gianluigi Donnarumma
RB	2	Giovanni Di Lorenzo	(yellow card) 50'
CB	19	Leonardo Bonucci (c)
CB	15	Francesco Acerbi
LB	4	Leonardo Spinazzola
CM	18	Nicolò Barella	(yellow card) 51'	(substituted off) 67'
CM	8	Jorginho
CM	6	Marco Verratti		(substituted off) 67'
RF	11	Domenico Berardi		(substituted off) 84'
CF	17	Ciro Immobile		(substituted off) 84'
LF	10	Lorenzo Insigne		(substituted off) 108'
Substitutions:
MF	12	Matteo Pessina		(substituted on) 67'
MF	5	Manuel Locatelli		(substituted on) 67'
FW	9	Andrea Belotti		(substituted on) 84'
MF	14	Federico Chiesa		(substituted on) 84'
MF	16	Bryan Cristante		(substituted on) 108'
Manager:
Roberto Mancini

GK	13	Daniel Bachmann
RB	21	Stefan Lainer		(substituted off) 114'
CB	3	Aleksandar Dragović	(yellow card) 120+1'
CB	4	Martin Hinteregger	(yellow card) 103'
LB	8	David Alaba (c)
CM	23	Xaver Schlager		(substituted off) 106'
CM	10	Florian Grillitsch		(substituted off) 106'
RW	24	Konrad Laimer		(substituted off) 114'
AM	9	Marcel Sabitzer
LW	19	Christoph Baumgartner		(substituted off) 90'
CF	7	Marko Arnautović	(yellow card) 2'	(substituted off) 97'
Substitutions:
MF	18	Alessandro Schöpf		(substituted on) 90'
FW	25	Saša Kalajdžić		(substituted on) 97'
MF	17	Louis Schaub		(substituted on) 106'
FW	11	Michael Gregoritsch		(substituted on) 106'
MF	6	Stefan Ilsanker		(substituted on) 114'
MF	16	Christopher Trimmel		(substituted on) 114'
Manager:
(Germany) Franco Foda

Man of the Match:
Leonardo Spinazzola (Italy)

Assistant referees:
Gary Beswick (England)
Adam Nunn (England)
Fourth official:
Sandro Schärer (Switzerland)
Reserve assistant referee:
Stéphane De Almeida (Switzerland)
Video assistant referee:
Stuart Attwell (England)
Assistant video assistant referees:
Chris Kavanagh (England)
Lee Betts (England)
Pol van Boekel (Netherlands)

=== Netherlands vs Czech Republic ===
27 June 2021
18:00

Netherlands	0–2	Czech Republic
	Report	Holeš 68'; Schick 80'

Puskás Aréna, Budapest
Attendance: 52,834
Referee: Sergei Karasev (Russia)

Netherlands	Czech Republic

GK	1	Maarten Stekelenburg
CB	6	Stefan de Vrij
CB	3	Matthijs de Ligt	(red card) 55'
CB	17	Daley Blind		(substituted off) 81'
RWB	22	Denzel Dumfries	(yellow card) 46'
LWB	12	Patrick van Aanholt		(substituted off) 81'
CM	15	Marten de Roon		(substituted off) 73'
CM	21	Frenkie de Jong	(yellow card) 84'
AM	8	Georginio Wijnaldum (c)
CF	10	Memphis Depay
CF	18	Donyell Malen		(substituted off) 57'
Substitutions:
MF	11	Quincy Promes		(substituted on) 57'
FW	19	Wout Weghorst		(substituted on) 73'
FW	7	Steven Berghuis		(substituted on) 81'
DF	25	Jurriën Timber		(substituted on) 81'
Manager:
Frank de Boer

GK	1	Tomáš Vaclík
RB	5	Vladimír Coufal	(yellow card) 56'
CB	3	Ondřej Čelůstka
CB	6	Tomáš Kalas
LB	2	Pavel Kadeřábek
CM	9	Tomáš Holeš		(substituted off) 85'
CM	15	Tomáš Souček (c)
RW	12	Lukáš Masopust		(substituted off) 79'
AM	7	Antonín Barák		(substituted off) 90+2'
LW	13	Petr Ševčík		(substituted off) 85'
CF	10	Patrik Schick		(substituted off) 90+2'
Substitutions:
MF	14	Jakub Jankto		(substituted on) 79'
FW	19	Adam Hložek		(substituted on) 85'
MF	21	Alex Král		(substituted on) 85'
FW	11	Michael Krmenčík		(substituted on) 90+2'
MF	26	Michal Sadílek		(substituted on) 90+2'
Manager:
Jaroslav Šilhavý

Man of the Match:
Tomáš Holeš (Czech Republic)

Assistant referees:
Igor Demeshko (Russia)
Maksim Gavrilin (Russia)
Fourth official:
Stéphanie Frappart (France)
Reserve assistant referee:
Mikaël Berchebru (France)
Video assistant referee:
Stuart Attwell (England)
Assistant video assistant referees:
Chris Kavanagh (England)
Lee Betts (England)
Paweł Gil (Poland)

=== Belgium vs Portugal ===
27 June 2021
21:00

Belgium	1–0	Portugal
T. Hazard 42'	Report

Estadio de La Cartuja, Seville
Attendance: 11,504
Referee: Felix Brych (Germany)

Belgium	Portugal

GK	1	Thibaut Courtois
CB	2	Toby Alderweireld	(yellow card) 81'
CB	5	Jan Vertonghen
CB	3	Thomas Vermaelen	(yellow card) 72'
RM	15	Thomas Meunier
CM	8	Youri Tielemans
CM	6	Axel Witsel
LM	16	Thorgan Hazard		(substituted off) 90+5'
RW	7	Kevin De Bruyne		(substituted off) 48'
LW	10	Eden Hazard (c)		(substituted off) 87'
CF	9	Romelu Lukaku
Substitutions:
FW	14	Dries Mertens		(substituted on) 48'
MF	11	Yannick Carrasco		(substituted on) 87'
MF	19	Leander Dendoncker		(substituted on) 90+5'
Manager:
(Spain) Roberto Martínez

GK	1	Rui Patrício
RB	20	Diogo Dalot	(yellow card) 51'
CB	4	Rúben Dias
CB	3	Pepe	(yellow card) 77'
LB	5	Raphaël Guerreiro
CM	8	João Moutinho		(substituted off) 55'
CM	26	João Palhinha	(yellow card) 45'	(substituted off) 78'
CM	16	Renato Sanches		(substituted off) 78'
RW	10	Bernardo Silva		(substituted off) 55'
LW	21	Diogo Jota		(substituted off) 70'
CF	7	Cristiano Ronaldo (c)
Substitutions:
FW	23	João Félix		(substituted on) 55'
MF	11	Bruno Fernandes		(substituted on) 55'
FW	9	André Silva		(substituted on) 70'
MF	13	Danilo Pereira		(substituted on) 78'
MF	24	Sérgio Oliveira		(substituted on) 78'
Manager:
Fernando Santos

Man of the Match:
Thorgan Hazard (Belgium)

Assistant referees:
Mark Borsch (Germany)
Stefan Lupp (Germany)
Fourth official:
Georgi Kabakov (Bulgaria)
Reserve assistant referee:
Martin Margaritov (Bulgaria)
Video assistant referee:
Marco Fritz (Germany)
Assistant video assistant referees:
Christian Dingert (Germany)
Christian Gittelmann (Germany)
Bastian Dankert (Germany)

=== Croatia vs Spain ===
28 June 2021
18:00

Croatia	3–5 (a.e.t.)	Spain
Pedri 20' (o.g.); Oršić 85'; Pašalić 90+2'	Report	Sarabia 38'; Azpilicueta 57'; F. Torres 77'; Morata 100'; Oyarzabal 103'

Parken Stadium, Copenhagen
Attendance: 22,771
Referee: Cüneyt Çakır (Turkey)

Croatia	Spain

GK	1	Dominik Livaković
RB	22	Josip Juranović		(substituted off) 73'
CB	21	Domagoj Vida
CB	5	Duje Ćaleta-Car	(yellow card) 84'
LB	25	Joško Gvardiol
DM	11	Marcelo Brozović	(yellow card) 73'
CM	10	Luka Modrić (c)		(substituted off) 114'
CM	8	Mateo Kovačić		(substituted off) 79'
RW	13	Nikola Vlašić		(substituted off) 79'
LW	17	Ante Rebić		(substituted off) 67'
CF	20	Bruno Petković		(substituted off) 46'
Substitutions:
FW	9	Andrej Kramarić		(substituted on) 46'
MF	18	Mislav Oršić		(substituted on) 67'
FW	7	Josip Brekalo		(substituted on) 73'
FW	14	Ante Budimir		(substituted on) 79'
MF	15	Mario Pašalić		(substituted on) 79'
MF	26	Luka Ivanušec		(substituted on) 114'
Manager:
Zlatko Dalić

GK	23	Unai Simón
RB	2	César Azpilicueta
CB	12	Eric García	(substituted off) 71'
CB	24	Aymeric Laporte
LB	14	José Gayà	(substituted off) 77'
CM	8	Koke	(substituted off) 77'
CM	5	Sergio Busquets (c)	(substituted off) 101'
CM	26	Pedri
RF	11	Ferran Torres	(substituted off) 88'
CF	7	Álvaro Morata
LF	22	Pablo Sarabia	(substituted off) 71'
Substitutions:
MF	19	Dani Olmo	(substituted on) 71'
DF	4	Pau Torres	(substituted on) 71'
DF	18	Jordi Alba	(substituted on) 77'
MF	17	Fabián Ruiz	(substituted on) 77'
FW	21	Mikel Oyarzabal	(substituted on) 88'
MF	16	Rodri	(substituted on) 101'
Manager:
Luis Enrique

Man of the Match:
Sergio Busquets (Spain)

Assistant referees:
Bahattin Duran (Turkey)
Tarık Ongun (Turkey)
Fourth official:
Andreas Ekberg (Sweden)
Reserve assistant referee:
Mehmet Culum (Sweden)
Video assistant referee:
Bastian Dankert (Germany)
Assistant video assistant referees:
Christian Dingert (Germany)
Christian Gittelmann (Germany)
Paweł Gil (Poland)

=== France vs Switzerland ===
28 June 2021
21:00 (22:00 UTC+3)

France	3–3 (a.e.t.)	Switzerland
Benzema 57', 59'; Pogba 75'	Report	Seferovic 15', 81'; Gavranović 90'
Penalties
Pogba (penalty scored); Giroud (penalty scored); Thuram (penalty scored); Kimpembe (penalty scored); Mbappé (penalty missed)	4–5	(penalty scored) Gavranović; (penalty scored) Schär; (penalty scored) Akanji; (penalty scored) Vargas; (penalty scored) Mehmedi

Arena Națională, Bucharest
Attendance: 22,642
Referee: Fernando Rapallini (Argentina)

France	Switzerland

GK	1	Hugo Lloris (c)
CB	4	Raphaël Varane	(yellow card) 30'
CB	5	Clément Lenglet		(substituted off) 46'
CB	3	Presnel Kimpembe
RWB	2	Benjamin Pavard	(yellow card) 91'
LWB	14	Adrien Rabiot
CM	6	Paul Pogba
CM	13	N'Golo Kanté
AM	7	Antoine Griezmann		(substituted off) 88'
CF	19	Karim Benzema		(substituted off) 94'
CF	10	Kylian Mbappé
Substitutions:
MF	20	Kingsley Coman	(yellow card) 88'	(substituted on) 46'	(substituted off) 111'
MF	17	Moussa Sissoko		(substituted on) 88'
FW	9	Olivier Giroud		(substituted on) 94'
FW	26	Marcus Thuram			(substituted on) 111'
Manager:
Didier Deschamps

GK	1	Yann Sommer
CB	4	Nico Elvedi	(yellow card) 32'
CB	5	Manuel Akanji	(yellow card) 108'
CB	13	Ricardo Rodriguez	(yellow card) 62'	(substituted off) 87'
RWB	3	Silvan Widmer		(substituted off) 73'
LWB	14	Steven Zuber		(substituted off) 79'
CM	8	Remo Freuler
CM	10	Granit Xhaka (c)	(yellow card) 76'
AM	23	Xherdan Shaqiri		(substituted off) 73'
CF	9	Haris Seferovic		(substituted off) 97'
CF	7	Breel Embolo		(substituted off) 79'
Substitutions:
FW	19	Mario Gavranović		(substituted on) 73'
DF	2	Kevin Mbabu		(substituted on) 73'
MF	16	Christian Fassnacht		(substituted on) 79'
MF	11	Rubén Vargas		(substituted on) 79'
FW	18	Admir Mehmedi		(substituted on) 87'
DF	22	Fabian Schär		(substituted on) 97'
Manager:
Vladimir Petković

Man of the Match:
Granit Xhaka (Switzerland)

Assistant referees:
Juan Pablo Belatti (Argentina)
Diego Bonfá (Argentina)
Fourth official:
Bartosz Frankowski (Poland)
Reserve assistant referee:
Marcin Boniek (Poland)
Video assistant referee:
Juan Martínez Munuera (Spain)
Assistant video assistant referees:
Alejandro Hernández Hernández (Spain)
Íñigo Prieto López de Cerain (Spain)
Massimiliano Irrati (Italy)

=== England vs Germany ===
29 June 2021
18:00 (17:00 UTC+1)

England	2–0	Germany
Sterling 75'; Kane 86'	Report

Wembley Stadium, London
Attendance: 41,973
Referee: Danny Makkelie (Netherlands)

England	Germany

GK	1	Jordan Pickford
CB	2	Kyle Walker
CB	6	Harry Maguire	(yellow card) 77'
CB	5	John Stones
RM	12	Kieran Trippier
CM	14	Kalvin Phillips	(yellow card) 45'
CM	4	Declan Rice	(yellow card) 8'	(substituted off) 87'
LM	3	Luke Shaw
RW	25	Bukayo Saka		(substituted off) 69'
LW	10	Raheem Sterling
CF	9	Harry Kane (c)
Substitutions:
MF	7	Jack Grealish		(substituted on) 69'
MF	8	Jordan Henderson		(substituted on) 87'
Manager:
Gareth Southgate

GK	1	Manuel Neuer (c)
CB	4	Matthias Ginter	(yellow card) 25'	(substituted off) 87'
CB	5	Mats Hummels
CB	2	Antonio Rüdiger
RM	6	Joshua Kimmich
CM	18	Leon Goretzka
CM	8	Toni Kroos
LM	20	Robin Gosens	(yellow card) 72'	(substituted off) 87'
AM	7	Kai Havertz
AM	25	Thomas Müller		(substituted off) 90+2'
CF	11	Timo Werner		(substituted off) 69'
Substitutions:
MF	10	Serge Gnabry		(substituted on) 69'
DF	23	Emre Can		(substituted on) 87'
MF	19	Leroy Sané		(substituted on) 87'
MF	14	Jamal Musiala		(substituted on) 90+2'
Manager:
Joachim Löw

Man of the Match:
Harry Maguire (England)

Assistant referees:
Hessel Steegstra (Netherlands)
Jan de Vries (Netherlands)
Fourth official:
Srđan Jovanović (Serbia)
Reserve assistant referee:
Uroš Stojković (Serbia)
Video assistant referee:
Pol van Boekel (Netherlands)
Assistant video assistant referees:
Kevin Blom (Netherlands)
Íñigo Prieto López de Cerain (Spain)
Alejandro Hernández Hernández (Spain)

=== Sweden vs Ukraine ===
29 June 2021
21:00 (20:00 UTC+1)

Sweden	1–2 (a.e.t.)	Ukraine
Forsberg 43'	Report	Zinchenko 27'; Dovbyk 120+1'

Hampden Park, Glasgow
Attendance: 9,221
Referee: Daniele Orsato (Italy)

Sweden	Ukraine

GK	1	Robin Olsen
RB	2	Mikael Lustig		(substituted off) 83'
CB	3	Victor Lindelöf
CB	24	Marcus Danielson	(red card) 99'
LB	6	Ludwig Augustinsson		(substituted off) 83'
RM	7	Sebastian Larsson (c)		(substituted off) 97'
CM	20	Kristoffer Olsson		(substituted off) 101'
CM	8	Albin Ekdal
LM	10	Emil Forsberg	(yellow card) 85'
CF	21	Dejan Kulusevski	(yellow card) 69'	(substituted off) 97'
CF	11	Alexander Isak		(substituted off) 97'
Substitutions:
DF	5	Pierre Bengtsson		(substituted on) 83'
DF	16	Emil Krafth		(substituted on) 83'
MF	22	Robin Quaison		(substituted on) 97'
FW	9	Marcus Berg		(substituted on) 97'
MF	17	Viktor Claesson		(substituted on) 97'
DF	14	Filip Helander		(substituted on) 101'
Manager:
Janne Andersson

GK	1	Heorhiy Bushchan
RB	21	Oleksandr Karavayev
CB	13	Illya Zabarnyi
CB	4	Serhiy Kryvtsov
LB	22	Mykola Matviyenko
CM	5	Serhiy Sydorchuk		(substituted off) 118'
CM	6	Taras Stepanenko		(substituted off) 95'
CM	17	Oleksandr Zinchenko
RF	7	Andriy Yarmolenko (c)	(yellow card) 79'	(substituted off) 106'
CF	9	Roman Yaremchuk		(substituted off) 91'
LF	10	Mykola Shaparenko		(substituted off) 61'
Substitutions:
MF	8	Ruslan Malinovskyi		(substituted on) 61'
FW	19	Artem Besyedin		(substituted on) 91'	(substituted off) 101'
MF	14	Yevhenii Makarenko		(substituted on) 95'
MF	15	Viktor Tsyhankov			(substituted on) 101'
FW	26	Artem Dovbyk	(yellow card) 120+1'	(substituted on) 106'
MF	18	Roman Bezus		(substituted on) 118'
Manager:
Andriy Shevchenko

Man of the Match:
Oleksandr Zinchenko (Ukraine)

Assistant referees:
Alessandro Giallatini (Italy)
Fabiano Preti (Italy)
Fourth official:
Davide Massa (Italy)
Reserve assistant referee:
Stefano Alassio (Italy)
Video assistant referee:
Massimiliano Irrati (Italy)
Assistant video assistant referees:
Marco Di Bello (Italy)
Filippo Meli (Italy)
Paolo Valeri (Italy)

== Quarter-finals ==
=== Switzerland vs Spain ===
2 July 2021
18:00 (19:00 UTC+3)

Switzerland	1–1 (a.e.t.)	Spain
Shaqiri 68'	Report	Zakaria 8' (o.g.)
Penalties
Gavranović (penalty scored); Schär (penalty missed); Akanji (penalty missed); Vargas (penalty missed)	1–3	(penalty missed) Busquets; (penalty scored) Olmo; (penalty missed) Rodri; (penalty scored) Gerard; (penalty scored) Oyarzabal

Krestovsky Stadium, Saint Petersburg
Attendance: 24,764
Referee: Michael Oliver (England)

Switzerland	Spain

GK	1	Yann Sommer
CB	4	Nico Elvedi
CB	5	Manuel Akanji
CB	13	Ricardo Rodriguez
RWB	3	Silvan Widmer	(yellow card) 67'	(substituted off) 100'
LWB	14	Steven Zuber		(substituted off) 90+2'
CM	6	Denis Zakaria		(substituted off) 100'
CM	8	Remo Freuler	(red card) 77'
AM	23	Xherdan Shaqiri (c)		(substituted off) 81'
AM	7	Breel Embolo		(substituted off) 23'
CF	9	Haris Seferovic		(substituted off) 81'
Substitutions:
MF	11	Rubén Vargas		(substituted on) 23'
MF	15	Djibril Sow		(substituted on) 81'
FW	19	Mario Gavranović	(yellow card) 120+1'	(substituted on) 81'
MF	16	Christian Fassnacht		(substituted on) 90+2'
DF	2	Kevin Mbabu		(substituted on) 100'
DF	22	Fabian Schär		(substituted on) 100'
Manager:
Vladimir Petković

GK	23	Unai Simón
RB	2	César Azpilicueta
CB	24	Aymeric Laporte	(yellow card) 90+3'
CB	4	Pau Torres		(substituted off) 113'
LB	18	Jordi Alba
CM	8	Koke		(substituted off) 90+1'
CM	5	Sergio Busquets (c)
CM	26	Pedri		(substituted off) 119'
RF	11	Ferran Torres		(substituted off) 91'
CF	7	Álvaro Morata		(substituted off) 54'
LF	22	Pablo Sarabia		(substituted off) 46'
Substitutions:
MF	19	Dani Olmo		(substituted on) 46'
FW	9	Gerard Moreno		(substituted on) 54'
MF	6	Marcos Llorente		(substituted on) 90+1'
FW	21	Mikel Oyarzabal		(substituted on) 91'
MF	10	Thiago		(substituted on) 113'
MF	16	Rodri		(substituted on) 119'
Manager:
Luis Enrique

Man of the Match:
Unai Simón (Spain)

Assistant referees:
Stuart Burt (England)
Simon Bennett (England)
Fourth official:
Ovidiu Hațegan (Romania)
Reserve assistant referee:
Sebastian Gheorghe (Romania)
Video assistant referee:
Chris Kavanagh (England)
Assistant video assistant referees:
Christian Dingert (Germany)
Lee Betts (England)
Stuart Attwell (England)

=== Belgium vs Italy ===
2 July 2021
21:00

Belgium	1–2	Italy
Lukaku 45+2' (pen.)	Report	Barella 31'; Insigne 44'

Allianz Arena, Munich
Attendance: 12,984
Referee: Slavko Vinčić (Slovenia)

Belgium	Italy

GK	1	Thibaut Courtois
CB	2	Toby Alderweireld
CB	3	Thomas Vermaelen
CB	5	Jan Vertonghen (c)
RM	15	Thomas Meunier		(substituted off) 69'
CM	6	Axel Witsel
CM	8	Youri Tielemans	(yellow card) 21'	(substituted off) 69'
LM	16	Thorgan Hazard
AM	7	Kevin De Bruyne
AM	25	Jérémy Doku
CF	9	Romelu Lukaku
Substitutions:
FW	14	Dries Mertens		(substituted on) 69'
MF	22	Nacer Chadli		(substituted on) 69'	(substituted off) 73'
MF	26	Dennis Praet			(substituted on) 73'
Manager:
(Spain) Roberto Martínez

GK	21	Gianluigi Donnarumma
RB	2	Giovanni Di Lorenzo
CB	19	Leonardo Bonucci
CB	3	Giorgio Chiellini (c)
LB	4	Leonardo Spinazzola		(substituted off) 79'
CM	18	Nicolò Barella
CM	8	Jorginho
CM	6	Marco Verratti	(yellow card) 20'	(substituted off) 74'
RW	14	Federico Chiesa		(substituted off) 90+1'
LW	10	Lorenzo Insigne		(substituted off) 79'
CF	17	Ciro Immobile		(substituted off) 74'
Substitutions:
MF	16	Bryan Cristante		(substituted on) 74'
FW	9	Andrea Belotti		(substituted on) 74'
FW	11	Domenico Berardi	(yellow card) 90'	(substituted on) 79'
DF	13	Emerson Palmieri		(substituted on) 79'
DF	25	Rafael Tolói		(substituted on) 90+1'
Manager:
Roberto Mancini

Man of the Match:
Lorenzo Insigne (Italy)

Assistant referees:
Tomaž Klančnik (Slovenia)
Andraž Kovačič (Slovenia)
Fourth official:
Fernando Rapallini (Argentina)
Reserve assistant referee:
Juan Pablo Belatti (Argentina)
Video assistant referee:
Bastian Dankert (Germany)
Assistant video assistant referees:
Marco Fritz (Germany)
Christian Gittelmann (Germany)
Paweł Gil (Poland)

=== Czech Republic vs Denmark ===
3 July 2021
18:00 (20:00 UTC+4)

Czech Republic	1–2	Denmark
Schick 49'	Report	Delaney 5'; Dolberg 42'

Olympic Stadium, Baku
Attendance: 16,306
Referee: Björn Kuipers (Netherlands)

Czech Republic	Denmark

GK	1	Tomáš Vaclík
RB	5	Vladimír Coufal
CB	3	Ondřej Čelůstka		(substituted off) 65'
CB	6	Tomáš Kalas	(yellow card) 86'
LB	18	Jan Bořil
CM	9	Tomáš Holeš		(substituted off) 46'
CM	15	Tomáš Souček (c)
RW	12	Lukáš Masopust		(substituted off) 46'
AM	7	Antonín Barák
LW	13	Petr Ševčík		(substituted off) 79'
CF	10	Patrik Schick		(substituted off) 79'
Substitutions:
FW	11	Michael Krmenčík	(yellow card) 84'	(substituted on) 46'
MF	14	Jakub Jankto		(substituted on) 46'
DF	4	Jakub Brabec		(substituted on) 65'
FW	20	Matěj Vydra		(substituted on) 79'
MF	8	Vladimír Darida		(substituted on) 79'
Manager:
Jaroslav Šilhavý

GK	1	Kasper Schmeichel
CB	6	Andreas Christensen	(substituted off) 81'
CB	4	Simon Kjær (c)
CB	3	Jannik Vestergaard
RM	17	Jens Stryger Larsen	(substituted off) 70'
CM	23	Pierre-Emile Højbjerg
CM	8	Thomas Delaney	(substituted off) 81'
LM	5	Joakim Mæhle
RF	9	Martin Braithwaite
CF	12	Kasper Dolberg	(substituted off) 59'
LF	14	Mikkel Damsgaard	(substituted off) 59'
Substitutions:
FW	20	Yussuf Poulsen	(substituted on) 59'
MF	15	Christian Nørgaard	(substituted on) 59'
MF	18	Daniel Wass	(substituted on) 70'
DF	2	Joachim Andersen	(substituted on) 81'
MF	24	Mathias Jensen	(substituted on) 81'
Manager:
Kasper Hjulmand

Man of the Match:
Thomas Delaney (Denmark)

Assistant referees:
Sander van Roekel (Netherlands)
Erwin Zeinstra (Netherlands)
Fourth official:
Sergei Karasev (Russia)
Reserve assistant referee:
Igor Demeshko (Russia)
Video assistant referee:
Pol van Boekel (Netherlands)
Assistant video assistant referees:
Kevin Blom (Netherlands)
Filippo Meli (Italy)
Massimiliano Irrati (Italy)

=== Ukraine vs England ===
3 July 2021
21:00

Ukraine	0–4	England
	Report	Kane 4', 50'; Maguire 46'; J. Henderson 63'

Stadio Olimpico, Rome
Attendance: 11,880
Referee: Felix Brych (Germany)

Ukraine	England

GK	1	Heorhiy Bushchan
CB	13	Illya Zabarnyi
CB	4	Serhiy Kryvtsov	(substituted off) 35'
CB	22	Mykola Matviyenko
RM	21	Oleksandr Karavayev
CM	5	Serhiy Sydorchuk	(substituted off) 64'
CM	17	Oleksandr Zinchenko
LM	16	Vitalii Mykolenko
AM	10	Mykola Shaparenko
CF	9	Roman Yaremchuk
CF	7	Andriy Yarmolenko (c)
Substitutions:
MF	15	Viktor Tsyhankov	(substituted on) 35'
MF	14	Yevhenii Makarenko	(substituted on) 64'
Manager:
Andriy Shevchenko

GK	1	Jordan Pickford
RB	2	Kyle Walker
CB	5	John Stones
CB	6	Harry Maguire
LB	3	Luke Shaw	(substituted off) 65'
CM	4	Declan Rice	(substituted off) 57'
CM	14	Kalvin Phillips	(substituted off) 65'
RW	17	Jadon Sancho
AM	19	Mason Mount
LW	10	Raheem Sterling	(substituted off) 65'
CF	9	Harry Kane (c)	(substituted off) 73'
Substitutions:
MF	8	Jordan Henderson	(substituted on) 57'
DF	12	Kieran Trippier	(substituted on) 65'
FW	11	Marcus Rashford	(substituted on) 65'
MF	26	Jude Bellingham	(substituted on) 65'
FW	18	Dominic Calvert-Lewin	(substituted on) 73'
Manager:
Gareth Southgate

Man of the Match:
Harry Kane (England)

Assistant referees:
Mark Borsch (Germany)
Stefan Lupp (Germany)
Fourth official:
Carlos del Cerro Grande (Spain)
Reserve assistant referee:
Juan Carlos Yuste Jiménez (Spain)
Video assistant referee:
Marco Fritz (Germany)
Assistant video assistant referees:
Christian Dingert (Germany)
Christian Gittelmann (Germany)
Bastian Dankert (Germany)

== Semi-finals ==
=== Italy vs Spain ===
6 July 2021
21:00 (20:00 UTC+1)

Italy	1–1 (a.e.t.)	Spain
Chiesa 60'	Report	Morata 80'
Penalties
Locatelli (penalty missed); Belotti (penalty scored); Bonucci (penalty scored); Bernardeschi (penalty scored); Jorginho (penalty scored)	4–2	(penalty missed) Olmo; (penalty scored) Gerard; (penalty scored) Thiago; (penalty missed) Morata

Wembley Stadium, London
Attendance: 57,811
Referee: Felix Brych (Germany)

Italy	Spain

GK	21	Gianluigi Donnarumma
RB	2	Giovanni Di Lorenzo
CB	19	Leonardo Bonucci	(yellow card) 118'
CB	3	Giorgio Chiellini (c)
LB	13	Emerson Palmieri		(substituted off) 73'
CM	18	Nicolò Barella		(substituted off) 85'
CM	8	Jorginho
CM	6	Marco Verratti		(substituted off) 73'
RW	14	Federico Chiesa		(substituted off) 107'
LW	10	Lorenzo Insigne		(substituted off) 85'
CF	17	Ciro Immobile		(substituted off) 61'
Substitutions:
FW	11	Domenico Berardi		(substituted on) 61'
DF	25	Rafael Tolói	(yellow card) 97'	(substituted on) 73'
MF	12	Matteo Pessina		(substituted on) 73'
MF	5	Manuel Locatelli		(substituted on) 85'
FW	9	Andrea Belotti		(substituted on) 85'
MF	20	Federico Bernardeschi		(substituted on) 107'
Manager:
Roberto Mancini

GK	23	Unai Simón
RB	2	César Azpilicueta		(substituted off) 85'
CB	12	Eric García		(substituted off) 109'
CB	24	Aymeric Laporte
LB	18	Jordi Alba
DM	5	Sergio Busquets (c)	(yellow card) 51'	(substituted off) 106'
CM	8	Koke		(substituted off) 70'
CM	26	Pedri
RW	11	Ferran Torres		(substituted off) 61'
LW	19	Dani Olmo
CF	21	Mikel Oyarzabal		(substituted off) 70'
Substitutions:
FW	7	Álvaro Morata		(substituted on) 61'
FW	9	Gerard Moreno		(substituted on) 70'
MF	16	Rodri		(substituted on) 70'
MF	6	Marcos Llorente		(substituted on) 85'
MF	10	Thiago		(substituted on) 106'
DF	4	Pau Torres		(substituted on) 109'
Manager:
Luis Enrique

Man of the Match:
Federico Chiesa (Italy)

Assistant referees:
Mark Borsch (Germany)
Stefan Lupp (Germany)
Fourth official:
Sergei Karasev (Russia)
Reserve assistant referee:
Maksim Gavrilin (Russia)
Video assistant referee:
Marco Fritz (Germany)
Assistant video assistant referees:
Christian Dingert (Germany)
Christian Gittelmann (Germany)
Bastian Dankert (Germany)

=== England vs Denmark ===
7 July 2021
21:00 (20:00 UTC+1)

England	2–1 (a.e.t.)	Denmark
Kjær 39' (o.g.); Kane 104'	Report	Damsgaard 30'

Wembley Stadium, London
Attendance: 64,950
Referee: Danny Makkelie (Netherlands)

England	Denmark

GK	1	Jordan Pickford
RB	2	Kyle Walker
CB	5	John Stones
CB	6	Harry Maguire	(yellow card) 49'
LB	3	Luke Shaw
CM	14	Kalvin Phillips
CM	4	Declan Rice		(substituted off) 95'
RW	25	Bukayo Saka		(substituted off) 69'
AM	19	Mason Mount		(substituted off) 95'
LW	10	Raheem Sterling
CF	9	Harry Kane (c)
Substitutions:
MF	7	Jack Grealish		(substituted on) 69'	(substituted off) 106'
MF	8	Jordan Henderson		(substituted on) 95'
MF	20	Phil Foden		(substituted on) 95'
DF	12	Kieran Trippier			(substituted on) 106'
Manager:
Gareth Southgate

GK	1	Kasper Schmeichel
CB	6	Andreas Christensen		(substituted off) 79'
CB	4	Simon Kjær (c)
CB	3	Jannik Vestergaard		(substituted off) 105'
RWB	17	Jens Stryger Larsen		(substituted off) 67'
LWB	5	Joakim Mæhle
CM	23	Pierre-Emile Højbjerg
CM	8	Thomas Delaney		(substituted off) 88'
RF	9	Martin Braithwaite
CF	12	Kasper Dolberg		(substituted off) 67'
LF	14	Mikkel Damsgaard		(substituted off) 67'
Substitutions:
MF	18	Daniel Wass	(yellow card) 72'	(substituted on) 67'
FW	20	Yussuf Poulsen		(substituted on) 67'
MF	15	Christian Nørgaard		(substituted on) 67'
DF	2	Joachim Andersen		(substituted on) 79'
MF	24	Mathias Jensen		(substituted on) 88' (Note: Mathias Jensen went off injured after Denmark had used all substitutions.)
FW	19	Jonas Wind		(substituted on) 105'
Manager:
Kasper Hjulmand

Man of the Match:
Harry Kane (England)

Assistant referees:
Hessel Steegstra (Netherlands)
Jan de Vries (Netherlands)
Fourth official:
Ovidiu Hațegan (Romania)
Reserve assistant referee:
Sebastian Gheorghe (Romania)
Video assistant referee:
Pol van Boekel (Netherlands)
Assistant video assistant referees:
Kevin Blom (Netherlands)
Christian Gittelmann (Germany)
Paweł Gil (Poland)

== Final ==
11 July 2021
21:00 (20:00 UTC+1)

Italy	1–1 (a.e.t.)	England
Bonucci 67'	Report	Shaw 2'
Penalties
Berardi (penalty scored); Belotti (penalty missed); Bonucci (penalty scored); Bernardeschi (penalty scored); Jorginho (penalty missed)	3–2	(penalty scored) Kane; (penalty scored) Maguire; (penalty missed) Rashford; (penalty missed) Sancho; (penalty missed) Saka

Wembley Stadium, London
Attendance: 67,173
Referee: Björn Kuipers (Netherlands)

Italy	England

GK	21	Gianluigi Donnarumma
RB	2	Giovanni Di Lorenzo
CB	19	Leonardo Bonucci	(yellow card) 55'
CB	3	Giorgio Chiellini (c)	(yellow card) 90+6'
LB	13	Emerson Palmieri		(substituted off) 118'
DM	8	Jorginho	(yellow card) 114'
CM	18	Nicolò Barella	(yellow card) 47'	(substituted off) 54'
CM	6	Marco Verratti		(substituted off) 96'
RW	14	Federico Chiesa		(substituted off) 86'
LW	10	Lorenzo Insigne	(yellow card) 85'	(substituted off) 91'
CF	17	Ciro Immobile		(substituted off) 54'
Substitutions:
MF	16	Bryan Cristante		(substituted on) 54'
MF	11	Domenico Berardi		(substituted on) 54'
MF	20	Federico Bernardeschi		(substituted on) 86'
FW	9	Andrea Belotti		(substituted on) 91'
MF	5	Manuel Locatelli		(substituted on) 96'
DF	24	Alessandro Florenzi		(substituted on) 118'
Manager:
Roberto Mancini

GK	1	Jordan Pickford
CB	2	Kyle Walker		(substituted off) 120'
CB	5	John Stones
CB	6	Harry Maguire	(yellow card) 106'
RWB	12	Kieran Trippier		(substituted off) 71'
LWB	3	Luke Shaw
CM	14	Kalvin Phillips
CM	4	Declan Rice		(substituted off) 74'
RW	10	Raheem Sterling
LW	19	Mason Mount		(substituted off) 99'
CF	9	Harry Kane (c)
Substitutions:
MF	25	Bukayo Saka		(substituted on) 71'
MF	8	Jordan Henderson		(substituted on) 74'	(substituted off) 120'
MF	7	Jack Grealish		(substituted on) 99'
FW	11	Marcus Rashford			(substituted on) 120'
MF	17	Jadon Sancho		(substituted on) 120'
Manager:
Gareth Southgate

Man of the Match:
Leonardo Bonucci (Italy)

Assistant referees:
Sander van Roekel (Netherlands)
Erwin Zeinstra (Netherlands)
Fourth official:
Carlos del Cerro Grande (Spain)
Reserve assistant referee:
Juan Carlos Yuste Jiménez (Spain)
Video assistant referee:
Bastian Dankert (Germany)
Assistant video assistant referees:
Pol van Boekel (Netherlands)
Christian Gittelmann (Germany)
Marco Fritz (Germany)
