= Atanas Chernev =

Bulgarian footballer (born 2002)

Atanas Chernev Атанас Чернев
Personal information
- Full name: Atanas Atanasov Chernev
- Date of birth: 25 March 2002 (age 24)
- Place of birth: Plovdiv, Bulgaria
- Height: 1.95 m (6 ft 5 in)
- Position: Centre-back

Team information
- Current team: Estrela da Amadora
- Number: 79

Youth career
- –2020: Botev Plovdiv
- 2020: → Getafe (loan)

Senior career*
Years	Team	Apps	(Gls)
2020–2025	Botev Plovdiv	54	(2)
2021–2025	Botev Plovdiv II	42	(1)
2025–	Estrela da Amadora	15	(0)
2026	→ 1. FC Kaiserslautern (loan)	7	(0)

International career^{‡}
2021–2024	Bulgaria U21	15	(0)
2025–	Bulgaria	2	(0)
- * Club domestic league appearances and goals as of 18 May 2026 ‡ National team caps and goals as of 21:33, 15 November 2025 (UTC)

Atanas Atanasov Chernev (Bulgarian: Атанас Атанасов Чернев; born 25 March 2002) is a Bulgarian professional footballer who plays as a centre-back for Primeira Liga club Estrela da Amadora and the Bulgaria national team.

== Club career ==
Chernev began his career with his hometown club Botev Plovdiv. In January 2020, he was loaned to Getafe's youth academy, but due to COVID-19 he struggled for playing time and returned to Botev in the summer.

He signed his first professional contract with Botev in 2020. In 2022, Chernev renewed his contract for 3 more years. On 13 June 2025, his contract with Botev was terminated due to unpaid wages.

On 2 July 2025 he was announced as the new signing of Portuguese club Estrela da Amadora, with a contract until the summer of 2026.

On 21 January 2026, Chernev signed with 2. Bundesliga side 1. FC Kaiserslautern on a loan deal until the end of the season.

== International career ==
On 26 September 2025 he received his first call-up for Bulgaria national team for the 2026 FIFA World Cup qualifiers against Turkey on 11 October and Spain on 14 October 2025. On 14 October 2025, Chernev earned his first cap, playing the full 90 minutes and scoring an own goal during the second half of the 0–4 away loss against Spain.
