= 2026 FIFA World Cup qualification – UEFA Group E =

Association football tournament group

The 2026 FIFA World Cup qualification UEFA Group E was one of the twelve UEFA groups in the World Cup qualification tournament to decide which teams would qualify for the 2026 FIFA World Cup tournament in Canada, Mexico and the United States. Group E consisted of four teams: Bulgaria, Georgia, Spain and Turkey. The teams played against each other home-and-away in a round-robin format from September to November 2025.

Spain qualified directly for the World Cup as group winners. As runners-up, Turkey advanced to the second round (play-offs).

== Standings ==
Pos	Team	Pld	W	D	L	GF	GA	GD	Pts	Qualification	(Spain national football team)	(Turkey national football team)	(Georgia national football team)	(Bulgaria national football team)
1	Spain	6	5	1	0	21	2	+19	16	Qualification for 2026 FIFA World Cup	—	2–2	2–0	4–0
2	Turkey	6	4	1	1	17	12	+5	13	Advance to play-offs	0–6	—	4–1	2–0
3	Georgia	6	1	0	5	7	15	−8	3		0–4	2–3	—	3–0
4	Bulgaria	6	1	0	5	3	19	−16	3		0–3	1–6	2–1	—

Source: FIFA, UEFA
Rules for classification: Tiebreakers

== Matches ==
The fixture list was confirmed by UEFA on 13 December 2024 following the draw. Times are CET/CEST, (Note: CEST (UTC+2) for matches until 26 October 2025 (matchdays 1–4), and CET (UTC+1) for matches thereafter (matchdays 5–6).) as listed by UEFA (local times, if different, are in parentheses).

4 September 2025
18:00 (20:00 UTC+4)

Georgia	2–3	Turkey
Davitashvili 63'; Kvaratskhelia 90+8'	Report (FIFA); Report (UEFA)	Müldür 3'; Aktürkoğlu 41', 52'

Boris Paichadze Dinamo Arena, Tbilisi
Attendance: 44,238
Referee: Davide Massa (Italy)
4 September 2025
20:45 (21:45 UTC+3)

Bulgaria	0–3	Spain
	Report (FIFA); Report (UEFA)	Oyarzabal 5'; Cucurella 30'; Merino 38'

Vasil Levski National Stadium, Sofia
Attendance: 40,582
Referee: Srđan Jovanović (Serbia)

7 September 2025
15:00 (17:00 UTC+4)

Georgia	3–0	Bulgaria
Kvaratskhelia 30'; N. Gagnidze 44'; Mikautadze 65'	Report (FIFA); Report (UEFA)

Boris Paichadze Dinamo Arena, Tbilisi
Attendance: 44,077
Referee: Glenn Nyberg (Sweden)
7 September 2025
20:45 (21:45 UTC+3)

Turkey	0–6	Spain
	Report (FIFA); Report (UEFA)	Pedri 6', 62'; Merino 22', 45+1', 57'; Torres 53'

Konya Metropolitan Municipality Stadium, Konya
Attendance: 32,059
Referee: Michael Oliver (England)

11 October 2025
20:45 (21:45 UTC+3)

Bulgaria	1–6	Turkey
Kirilov 13'	Report (FIFA); Report (UEFA)	Güler 11'; Popov 49' (o.g.); Yıldız 51', 56'; Çelik 65'; Kahveci 90+3'

Vasil Levski National Stadium, Sofia
Attendance: 10,059
Referee: Luis Godinho (Portugal)
11 October 2025
20:45

Spain	2–0	Georgia
Pino 24'; Oyarzabal 64'	Report (FIFA); Report (UEFA)

Martínez Valero, Elche
Attendance: 28,661
Referee: Manfredas Lukjančukas (Lithuania)

14 October 2025
20:45 (21:45 UTC+3)

Turkey	4–1	Georgia
Yıldız 14'; Demiral 22', 52'; Akgün 35'	Report (FIFA); Report (UEFA)	Kochorashvili 64'

Kocaeli Stadium, İzmit
Attendance: 26,633
Referee: Radu Petrescu (Romania)
14 October 2025
20:45

Spain	4–0	Bulgaria
Merino 35', 57'; Chernev 79' (o.g.); Oyarzabal 90+2' (pen.)	Report (FIFA); Report (UEFA)

José Zorrilla, Valladolid
Attendance: 24,526
Referee: Willy Delajod (France)

15 November 2025
18:00 (21:00 UTC+4)

Georgia	0–4	Spain
	Report (FIFA); Report (UEFA)	Oyarzabal 11' (pen.), 63'; Zubimendi 22'; Torres 35'

Boris Paichadze Dinamo Arena, Tbilisi
Attendance: 44,314
Referee: Benoît Bastien (France)
15 November 2025
18:00 (20:00 UTC+3)

Turkey	2–0	Bulgaria
Çalhanoğlu 18' (pen.); Chernev 83' (o.g.)	Report (FIFA); Report (UEFA)

Centennial Atatürk Stadium, Bursa
Attendance: 42,756
Referee: Nick Walsh (Scotland)

18 November 2025
20:45 (21:45 UTC+2)

Bulgaria	2–1	Georgia
Rusev 10'; Krastev 24'	Report (FIFA); Report (UEFA)	Lochoshvili 88'

Vasil Levski National Stadium, Sofia
Attendance: 1,980
Referee: Jakob Kehlet (Denmark)
18 November 2025
20:45

Spain	2–2	Turkey
Olmo 4'; Oyarzabal 62'	Report (FIFA); Report (UEFA)	Gül 42'; Özcan 54'

La Cartuja, Seville
Attendance: 30,812
Referee: Felix Zwayer (Germany)

== Goalscorers ==
There were 48 goals scored in 12 matches, for an average of 4 goals per match.

6 goals

- (Spain national football team) Mikel Merino
- (Spain national football team) Mikel Oyarzabal

3 goals

- (Turkey national football team) Kenan Yıldız

2 goals

- (Georgia national football team) Khvicha Kvaratskhelia
- (Spain national football team) Pedri
- (Spain national football team) Ferran Torres
- (Turkey national football team) Kerem Aktürkoğlu
- (Turkey national football team) Merih Demiral

1 goal

- (Bulgaria national football team) Radoslav Kirilov
- (Bulgaria national football team) Filip Krastev
- (Bulgaria national football team) Georgi Rusev
- (Georgia national football team) Zuriko Davitashvili
- (Georgia national football team) Nika Gagnidze
- (Georgia national football team) Giorgi Kochorashvili
- (Georgia national football team) Luka Lochoshvili
- (Georgia national football team) Georges Mikautadze
- (Spain national football team) Marc Cucurella
- (Spain national football team) Dani Olmo
- (Spain national football team) Yéremy Pino
- (Spain national football team) Martín Zubimendi
- (Turkey national football team) Yunus Akgün
- (Turkey national football team) Hakan Çalhanoğlu
- (Turkey national football team) Zeki Çelik
- (Turkey national football team) Deniz Gül
- (Turkey national football team) Arda Güler
- (Turkey national football team) İrfan Can Kahveci
- (Turkey national football team) Mert Müldür
- (Turkey national football team) Salih Özcan

1 own goal

- (Bulgaria national football team) Viktor Popov (against Turkey)

2 own goals

- (Bulgaria national football team) Atanas Chernev (against Spain and Turkey)

== Discipline ==
A player or team official was automatically suspended for the next match for the following offences:

- Receiving a red card (red card suspensions could be extended for serious offences)
- Receiving two yellow cards in two different matches (yellow card suspensions were carried forward to the play-offs, but not the finals or any other future international matches)

The following suspensions were served during the qualifying matches:

Team	Player	Offence(s)	Suspended for match(es)
Turkey	Barış Alper Yılmaz	(red card) vs Georgia (4 September 2025)	vs Spain (7 September 2025) vs Bulgaria (11 October 2025)
Turkey	İsmail Yüksek	(yellow card) vs Georgia (4 September 2025); (yellow card) vs Bulgaria (15 November 2025)	vs Spain (18 November 2025)
Georgia	Willy Sagnol (manager)	(red card) vs Turkey (4 September 2025)	vs Bulgaria (7 September 2025)
Georgia	Luka Lochoshvili	(yellow card) vs Turkey (4 September 2025); (yellow card) vs Bulgaria (7 September 2025)	vs Spain (11 October 2025)
Georgia	Giorgi Kochorashvili	(yellow card) vs Turkey (4 September 2025); (yellow card) vs Turkey (14 October 2025)	vs Spain (15 November 2025)
