= Mikel Oyarzabal =

Spanish footballer (born 1997)

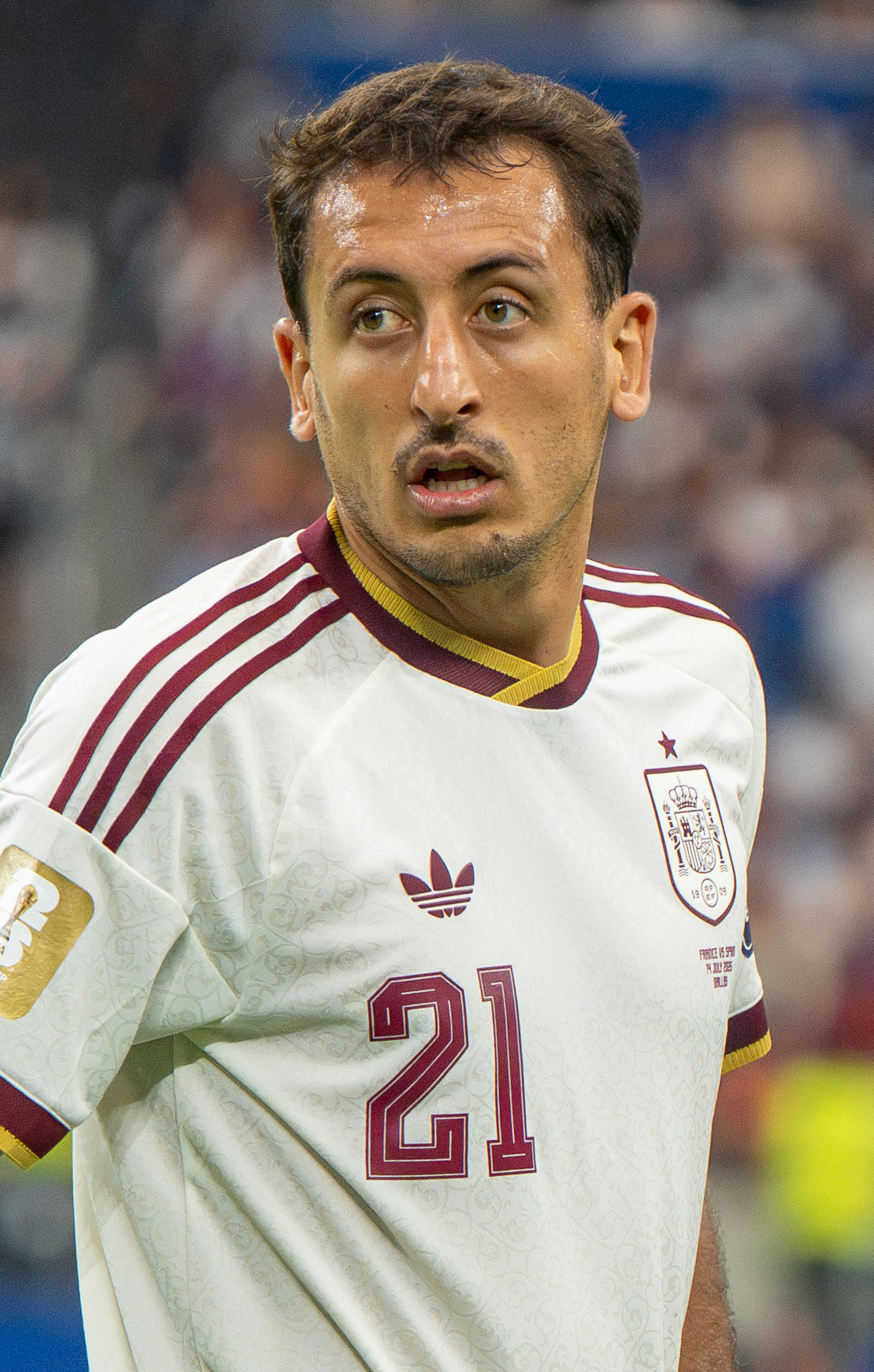
- Oyarzabal with Spain in 2026

Personal information
- Full name: Mikel Oyarzabal Ugarte
- Date of birth: 21 April 1997 (age 29)
- Place of birth: Eibar, Spain
- Height: 1.81 m (5 ft 11 in)
- Position: Forward

Team information
- Current team: Real Sociedad
- Number: 10

Youth career
- Eibar
- 2011–2014: Real Sociedad
- 2013–2014: → Eibar (loan)

Senior career*
Years	Team	Apps	(Gls)
2014–2015	Real Sociedad B	13	(3)
2015–	Real Sociedad	361	(103)

International career^{‡}
2015	Spain U18	2	(0)
2016	Spain U19	4	(0)
2017–2019	Spain U21	25	(8)
2021	Spain U23	7	(3)
2016–	Spain	65	(32)
2016	Basque Country	1	(1)
Medal record
Men's football
Representing Spain
FIFA World Cup
Winner	2026 Canada–Mexico–US	Team
UEFA European Championship
Winner	2024 Germany	Team
Bronze medal – third place	2020 Europe	Team
UEFA Nations League
Runner-up	2021 Italy
Runner-up	2025 Germany
Olympic Games
Silver medal – second place	2020 Tokyo	Team
UEFA European Under-21 Championship
Winner	2019 Italy	Team
Runner-up	2017 Poland	Team
- * Club domestic league appearances and goals as of 21:10, 22 November 2026 (UTC) ‡ National team caps and goals as of 22:10, 15 November 2026 (UTC)

Mikel Oyarzabal Ugarte (born 21 April 1997) is a Spanish professional footballer who plays as a forward for La Liga club Real Sociedad, which he captains, and the Spain national team.

He has spent his entire professional career with Real Sociedad, making more than 450 appearances and scoring over 130 goals. He won the 2019–20 and the 2025–26 Copa del Rey with the club, scoring in both finals.

Oyarzabal made his full debut for the Spain national team in 2016, representing the side at the 2026 World Cup and two European Championships, winning the 2026 World Cup and Euro 2024 and scoring the decisive goal in the latter final.

== Club career ==
Born in Eibar, Gipuzkoa, Oyarzabal joined Real Sociedad's youth setup in 2011, aged 14. While still a junior, he made his senior debut with the reserves on 15 November 2014, coming on as a second-half substitute in a 3–2 away win against Amorebieta in the Segunda División B.

On 20 September 2015, Oyarzabal scored his first senior goals, scoring twice in a 5–0 away rout of Mensajero. He made his first-team and La Liga debut on 25 October, replacing Carlos Vela in the dying minutes of a 4–0 victory at Levante.

Oyarzabal scored his first goal for Real Sociedad on 8 February 2016 in a 5–0 away win over Espanyol. Six days later, shortly after having extended his contract until 2021, he scored two goals to help defeat Granada 3–0 at the Anoeta Stadium.

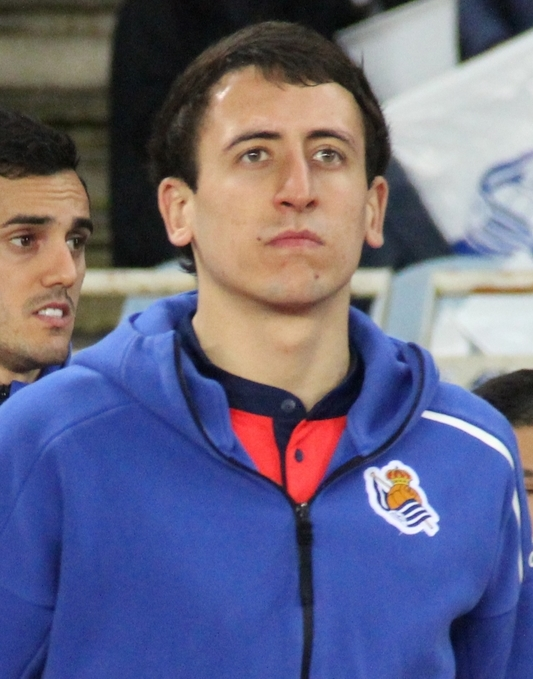
Oyarzabal with Real Sociedad in 2018

On 19 August 2016, Oyarzabal again renewed his contract until 2022. He featured in all 38 league matches over the season, as the San Sebastián-based team came sixth and returned to the UEFA Europa League after a two-year absence.

Oyarzabal made his European debut on 19 October 2017, scoring in a 6–0 thrashing of Macedonia's Vardar in the Europa League group stage; his team made it to the last 32, with him scoring an own goal in a 4–3 aggregate loss to Red Bull Salzburg. On the domestic front he scored 12 goals, including two in a 5–0 win against Girona on 8 April 2018.

On 5 October 2018, Oyarzabal scored his first goals since May of that year, converting two penalties in a 3–1 away victory over Athletic Bilbao in the Basque derby. The opposition had tried to sign him in the previous summer transfer window, but he had rejected their approach in favour of signing a new contract with Real Sociedad to run until 2024. He set a new personal best that campaign, netting 13 times.

In the 2019–20 Copa del Rey, Oyarzabal scored a penalty in each leg of a 3–1 aggregate defeat of Mirandés as his team reached the final for the first time since 1988. On 10 July that year, he achieved his 50th goal for the club in a 3–2 home loss against Granada, and on 3 October he scored a penalty in his 200th match in a 3–0 win over Getafe.

On 3 April 2021, Oyarzabal scored the only goal of the delayed 2020 Copa del Rey final, also through a penalty, to help Real Sociedad beat Athletic Bilbao and clinch their first trophy in 34 years. In March 2022, he ruptured the anterior cruciate ligament of his left knee during a training session, potentially ruling him out for the rest of that year. He returned on 31 December as a late substitute in a 2–0 home win over Osasuna, and two weeks later scored his first goal since his recovery to conclude a 3–1 victory against Athletic at the same venue; it was his sixth goal (four from the spot) in 14 games against the rivals.

In February 2023, Oyarzabal extended his contract until 2028, retaining the buyout clause of €75 million. He became captain in June, when Asier Illarramendi left.

Oyarzabal scored his 100th goal for Real Sociedad on 1 December 2024, through a penalty in the 2–0 home win against Real Betis. He made his 400th appearance the following 30 August, in a 1–0 loss at Real Oviedo.

On 4 March 2026, Oyarzabal scored a late penalty to help Real to reach another Spanish cup final after beating Athletic Bilbao 2–0 on aggregate. In the decisive match, on 18 April, he repeated the feat in the 45th minute of an eventual penalty shootout victory over Atlético Madrid; it was his sixth career final, and he found the net in all of them while being on the winning side on four occasions.

Oyarzabal scored his 100th top-division goal on 9 May 2026, from a penalty kick in a 2–2 draw with Betis. He finished the season with a career-high 15.

== International career ==
=== Spain ===
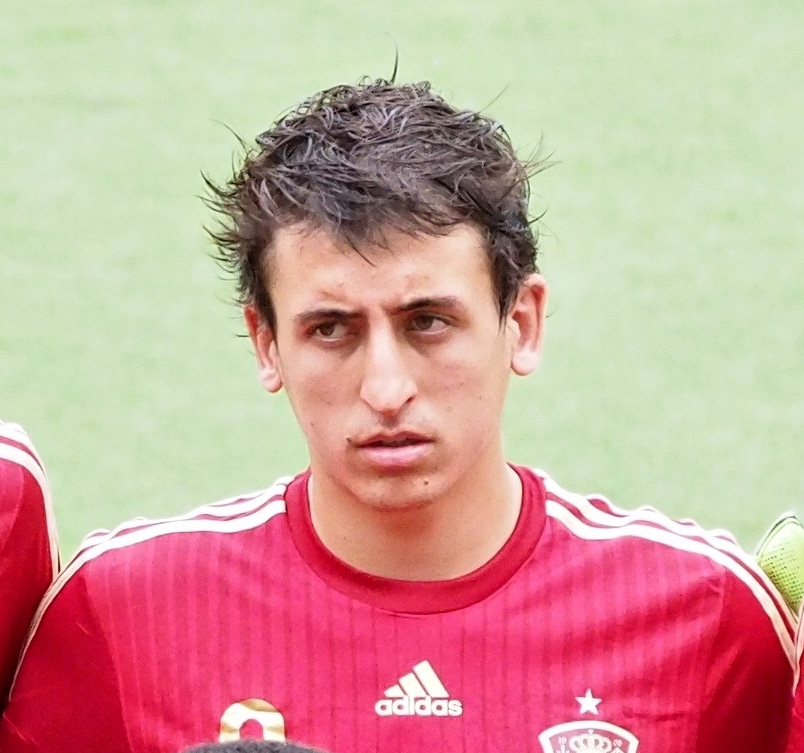
Oyarzabal with Spain under-18 in 2015

Oyarzabal represented Spain at under-18, under-19 and under-21 levels. On 17 May 2016, aged 19, he was called up to the senior squad for a friendly against Bosnia and Herzegovina. Twelve days later, he replaced Nolito (who had scored) at the hour mark of the 3–1 win.

On 10 June 2019, Oyarzabal scored his first goal, in a 3–0 victory over Sweden in the UEFA Euro 2020 qualifiers. In May 2021, he was included in Luis Enrique's 24-man squad for the finals. As a late substitute, he scored the last goal of a 5–3 extra-time win against Croatia in the last 16. In the following round, he scored the last attempt of a penalty shootout defeat of Switzerland (1–1 after 120 minutes).

Oyarzabal was selected for the Olympic squad to compete in Tokyo in 2021. He scored three times for the runners-up, including once in the 2–1 final loss to Brazil. In the 2021 UEFA Nations League final against France on 10 October, he scored the opening goal of the match, but Spain ultimately suffered a 2–1 defeat.

After being absent from the national team at the time of the 2022 FIFA World Cup due to his serious knee injury, Oyarzabal made a provisional list for Euro 2024 on 27 May. He scored his first international hat-trick on 5 June, in a 5–0 friendly win over Andorra prior to the tournament. In the finals in Germany, he played all seven games for the champions, starting once. On 14 July, he scored in the 86th minute in the final to secure a 2–1 victory against England.

Oyarzabal playing for Spain in the 2026 FIFA World Cup final

Oyarzabal was called by Spain for the 2026 World Cup. On 15 June, in their opener against Cape Verde, he became the first player on record (since 1966) to fail to touch the ball in the first 30 minutes of a World Cup match. In the following fixture, however, he scored twice and also provided an assist for Lamine Yamal in the 4–0 win over Saudi Arabia. In the round of 32, he achieved another brace in the 3–0 defeat of Austria. In the semi-final, he opened the 2–0 victory against France with a penalty after Yamal was fouled by Lucas Digne; the goal was his fifth of the tournament, equaling the record for the most by a Spanish player in a single edition previously achieved by Emilio Butragueño and David Villa. He also scored his 30th international goal for Spain, becoming the sixth-highest in the nation's history.

=== Basque Country ===
Oyarzabal featured for the non-affiliated Basque Country national team, scoring on his debut to cap a 3–1 win over Tunisia at the San Mamés Stadium on 30 December 2016.

== Personal life ==
Oyarzabal combined his early professional career with studying for a business degree at the University of Deusto. He started a relationship with Ainhoa Larrauri in 2015, with their first son Martin being born in December 2023 and the second, Eneko, in November 2026.

== Career statistics ==
=== Club ===
As of match played 22 November 2026

Appearances and goals by club, season and competition
Club	Season	League			Copa del Rey		Europe		Other		Total	
Club	Season	Division	Apps	Goals	Apps	Goals	Apps	Goals	Apps	Goals	Apps	Goals
Real Sociedad B	2014–15	Segunda División B	5	0	—		—		—		5	0
Real Sociedad B	2015–16	Segunda División B	8	3	—		—		—		8	3
Real Sociedad B	Total		13	3	—		—		—		13	3
Real Sociedad	2015–16	La Liga	22	6	2	0	—		—		24	6
Real Sociedad	2016–17	La Liga	38	2	5	2	—		—		43	4
Real Sociedad	2017–18	La Liga	35	12	2	0	6 (Note: Appearances in UEFA Europa League)	2	—		43	14
Real Sociedad	2018–19	La Liga	37	13	4	1	—		—		41	14
Real Sociedad	2019–20	La Liga	37	10	8 (Note: Includes appearance and goal in 2020 Copa del Rey final (played in 2021))	3	—		—		45	13
Real Sociedad	2020–21	La Liga	33	11	2	1	7	0	1 (Note: Appearance in Supercopa de España)	1	43	13
Real Sociedad	2021–22	La Liga	22	9	5	3	6	3	—		33	15
Real Sociedad	2022–23	La Liga	23	4	3	0	2	0	—		28	4
Real Sociedad	2023–24	La Liga	33	9	4	3	7 (Note: Appearances in UEFA Champions League)	2	—		44	14
Real Sociedad	2024–25	La Liga	35	9	6	4	12	5	—		53	18
Real Sociedad	2025–26	La Liga	34	15	6	3	—		—		40	18
Real Sociedad	2026–27	La Liga	12	3	0	0	4	0	0	0	16	3
Real Sociedad	Total		361	103	47	20	44	12	1	1	453	136
Career total			374	106	47	20	44	12	1	1	466	139

=== International ===
As of match played 15 November 2026

Appearances and goals by national team and year
Year	Spain		Basque Country	
Year	Apps	Goals	Apps	Goals
2016	1	0	1	1
2017	0	0	0	0
2018	0	0	0	0
2019	6	2	0	0
2020	4	2	0	0
2021	10	2	0	0
2022	0	0	0	0
2023	5	1	0	0
2024	15	6	0	0
2025	10	9	0	0
2026	14	10	0	0
Total	65	32	1	1

As of match played 15 November 2026
Scores and results list Spain's goal tally first, score column indicates score after each Oyarzabal goal.

List of international goals scored by Mikel Oyarzabal
Spain goals
No.	Date	Venue	Cap	Opponent	Score	Result	Competition
1	10 June 2019	Santiago Bernabéu, Madrid, Spain	2	Sweden	3–0	3–0	UEFA Euro 2020 qualifying
2	18 November 2019	Metropolitano Stadium, Madrid, Spain	7	Romania	5–0	5–0	UEFA Euro 2020 qualifying
3	10 October 2020	Alfredo Di Stéfano Stadium, Madrid, Spain	8	Switzerland	1–0	1–0	2020–21 UEFA Nations League A
4	17 November 2020	Estadio de La Cartuja, Seville, Spain	11	Germany	6–0	6–0	2020–21 UEFA Nations League A
5	28 June 2021	Parken Stadium, Copenhagen, Denmark	17	Croatia	5–3	5–3 (a.e.t.)	UEFA Euro 2020
6	10 October 2021	San Siro, Milan, Italy	21	France	1–0	1–2	2021 UEFA Nations League Finals
7	16 November 2023	Alphamega Stadium, Limassol, Cyprus	26	Cyprus	2–0	3–1	UEFA Euro 2024 qualifying
8	5 June 2024	Estadio Nuevo Vivero, Badajoz, Spain	29	Andorra	2–0	5–0	Friendly
9	5 June 2024	Estadio Nuevo Vivero, Badajoz, Spain	29	Andorra	3–0	5–0	Friendly
10	5 June 2024	Estadio Nuevo Vivero, Badajoz, Spain	29	Andorra	4–0	5–0	Friendly
11	8 June 2024	Estadi Mallorca Son Moix, Palma, Spain	30	Northern Ireland	5–1	5–1	Friendly
12	14 July 2024	Olympiastadion, Berlin, Germany	37	England	2–1	2–1	UEFA Euro 2024
13	15 November 2024	Parken Stadium, Copenhagen, Denmark	41	Denmark	1–0	2–1	2024–25 UEFA Nations League A
14	23 March 2025	Mestalla Stadium, Valencia, Spain	43	Netherlands	1–0	3–3 (a.e.t.) (5–4 p)	2024–25 UEFA Nations League A
15	23 March 2025	Mestalla Stadium, Valencia, Spain	43	Netherlands	2–1	3–3 (a.e.t.) (5–4 p)	2024–25 UEFA Nations League A
16	8 June 2025	Allianz Arena, Munich, Germany	45	Portugal	2–1	2–2 (a.e.t.) (3–5 p)	2025 UEFA Nations League Finals
17	4 September 2025	Vasil Levski National Stadium, Sofia, Bulgaria	46	Bulgaria	1–0	3–0	2026 FIFA World Cup qualification
18	11 October 2025	Estadio Martínez Valero, Elche, Spain	48	Georgia	2–0	2–0	2026 FIFA World Cup qualification
19	14 October 2025	José Zorrilla Stadium, Valladolid, Spain	49	Bulgaria	4–0	4–0	2026 FIFA World Cup qualification
20	15 November 2025	Boris Paichadze Dinamo Arena, Tbilisi, Georgia	50	Georgia	1–0	4–0	2026 FIFA World Cup qualification
21	15 November 2025	Boris Paichadze Dinamo Arena, Tbilisi, Georgia	50	Georgia	4–0	4–0	2026 FIFA World Cup qualification
22	18 November 2025	Estadio de La Cartuja, Seville, Spain	51	Turkey	2–2	2–2	2026 FIFA World Cup qualification
23	27 March 2026	Estadio de la Cerámica, Villarreal, Spain	52	Serbia	1–0	3–0	Friendly
24	27 March 2026	Estadio de la Cerámica, Villarreal, Spain	52	Serbia	2–0	3–0	Friendly
25	8 June 2026	Estadio Cuauhtémoc, Puebla, Mexico	53	Peru	1–0	3–1	Friendly
26	21 June 2026	Mercedes-Benz Stadium, Atlanta, United States	55	Saudi Arabia	2–0	4–0	2026 FIFA World Cup
27	21 June 2026	Mercedes-Benz Stadium, Atlanta, United States	55	Saudi Arabia	3–0	4–0	2026 FIFA World Cup
28	2 July 2026	SoFi Stadium, Inglewood, United States	57	Austria	1–0	3–0	2026 FIFA World Cup
29	2 July 2026	SoFi Stadium, Inglewood, United States	57	Austria	3–0	3–0	2026 FIFA World Cup
30	14 July 2026	AT&T Stadium, Arlington, United States	60	France	1–0	2–0	2026 FIFA World Cup
31	26 September 2026	Wembley Stadium, London, England	62	England	3–2	3–2	2026–27 UEFA Nations League A
32	15 November 2026	Metropolitano Stadium, Madrid, Spain	65	England	1–3	2–3	2026–27 UEFA Nations League A
(Basque Country (autonomous community)) Basque Country goals
1	30 December 2016	San Mamés Stadium, Bilbao, Spain	30	Tunisia	3–1	3–1	Friendly

== Honours ==
Real Sociedad

- Copa del Rey: 2019–20, 2025–26

Spain U21

- UEFA European Under-21 Championship: 2019; runner-up: 2017

Spain U23

- Summer Olympics silver medal: 2020

Spain

- FIFA World Cup: 2026
- UEFA European Championship: 2024
- UEFA Nations League runner-up: 2020–21, 2024–25

Individual

- La Liga Team of the Season: 2025–26
- La Liga Player of the Month: October 2020
- La Liga Play of the Month: March 2024 (with Mikel Merino)
