= Serbia national football team results (2020–present) =

This is a list of the Serbia national football team results from 2020 to present.

== Fixtures and results ==
=== 2020 ===
3 September 2020 2020–21 UEFA Nations League	Russia	3–1	Serbia	Moscow, Russia
21:45 UTC+3	Dzyuba 48' (pen.), 81'; Karavayev 69'	Report	Mitrović 78'	Stadium: VTB Arena; Attendance: 0 (Note: Due to the COVID-19 pandemic in Europe, the match was played behind closed doors.); Referee: William Collum (Scotland)

6 September 2020 2020–21 UEFA Nations League	Serbia	0–0	Turkey	Belgrade, Serbia
20:45 UTC+2		Report		Stadium: Rajko Mitić Stadium; Attendance: 0 Referee: Aleksei Kulbakov (Belarus)

8 October 2020 UEFA Euro 2020 qualifying play-offs	Norway	1–2 (a.e.t.)	Serbia	Oslo, Norway
20:45 UTC+2	Normann 88'	Report	Milinković-Savić 82', 102'	Stadium: Ullevaal Stadion; Attendance: 200; Referee: Daniele Orsato (Italy)

11 October 2020 2020–21 UEFA Nations League	Serbia	0–1	Hungary	Belgrade, Serbia
20:45 UTC+2		Report	Könyves 20'	Stadium: Rajko Mitić Stadium; Attendance: 0 Referee: Sandro Schärer (Switzerland)

14 October 2020 2020–21 UEFA Nations League	Turkey	2–2	Serbia	Istanbul, Turkey
21:45 UTC+3	Çalhanoğlu 57'; Tufan 76'	Report	Milinković-Savić 22'; Mitrović 49' (pen.)	Stadium: Türk Telekom Stadium; Attendance: 0 Referee: Georgi Kabakov (Bulgaria)

12 November 2020 UEFA Euro 2020 qualifying play-offs	Serbia	1–1 (a.e.t.) (4–5 p)	Scotland	Belgrade, Serbia
20:45 UTC+1	Jović 90'	Report	Christie 52'	Stadium: Rajko Mitić Stadium; Attendance: 0 Referee: Antonio Mateu Lahoz (Spain)
	Penalties
	Tadić (penalty scored); Jović (penalty scored); Gudelj (penalty scored); Katai (penalty scored); A. Mitrović (penalty missed)		(penalty scored) Griffiths; (penalty scored) McGregor; (penalty scored) McTominay; (penalty scored) McBurnie; (penalty scored) McLean

15 November 2020 2020–21 UEFA Nations League	Hungary	1–1	Serbia	Budapest, Hungary
20:45 UTC+1	Kalmár 39'	Report	Radonjić 17'	Stadium: Puskás Aréna; Attendance: 0 Referee: Glenn Nyberg (Sweden)

18 November 2020 2020–21 UEFA Nations League	Serbia	5–0	Russia	Belgrade, Serbia
20:45 UTC+1	Radonjić 10'; Jović 25', 45+1'; Vlahović 41'; Mladenović 64'	Report		Stadium: Rajko Mitić Stadium; Attendance: 0 Referee: Anthony Taylor (England)

=== 2021 ===
25 January 2021 International friendly	Dominican Republic	0–0	Serbia	Santo Domingo, Dominican Republic
22:00		Report		Stadium: Estadio Olímpico Félix Sánchez; Attendance: 0 Referee: William Anderson (Puerto Rico)

28 January 2021 International friendly	Panama	0–0	Serbia	Panama City, Panama
19:00 UTC+5		Report		Stadium: Estadio Rommel Fernández; Attendance: 0 Referee: Ameth Ariel Sánchez Pinzón (Panama)

24 March 2021 2022 FIFA World Cup qualification	Serbia	3–2	Republic of Ireland	Belgrade, Serbia
20:45	Vlahović 40'; A. Mitrović 69', 76'	Report (FIFA); Report (UEFA)	Browne 18'; Collins 86'	Stadium: Rajko Mitić Stadium; Attendance: 0 Referee: Davide Massa (Italy)

27 March 2021 2022 FIFA World Cup qualification	Serbia	2–2	Portugal	Belgrade, Serbia
20:45	A. Mitrović 46'; Kostić 60'	Report (FIFA); Report (UEFA)	Jota 11', 36'	Stadium: Stadion Rajko Mitić; Attendance: 0 Referee: Danny Makkelie (Netherlands)

30 March 2021 2022 FIFA World Cup qualification	Azerbaijan	1–2	Serbia	Baku, Azerbaijan
18:00	Mahmudov 59' (pen.)	Report (FIFA); Report (UEFA)	A. Mitrović 16', 81'	Stadium: Baku Olympic Stadium; Attendance: 0 Referee: Roi Reinshreiber (Israel)

7 June 2021 International friendly	Serbia	1–1	Jamaica	Miki, Japan
09:00	Pavlović 61'	Report	Gray 29'	Stadium: Miki Athletic Stadium; Attendance: 0 Referee: Yudai Yamamoto (Japan)

11 June 2021 2021 Kirin Challenge Cup	Japan	1–0	Serbia	Kobe, Japan
12:25	Ito 48'	Report		Stadium: Noevir Stadium Kobe; Attendance: 0 Referee: Ahmed Eisa Darwish (United Arab Emirates)

1 September 2021 International friendly	Qatar	0–4	Serbia	Debrecen, Hungary
20:45		Report	Khoukhi 2' (o.g.); Jović 17'; Vlahović 60'; Milenković 84'	Stadium: Nagyerdei Stadion; Attendance: 0 Referee: Filip Glova (Slovakia)

4 September 2021 2022 FIFA World Cup qualification	Serbia	4–1	Luxembourg	Belgrade, Serbia
18:00	Mitrović 22', 35'; Chanot 82' (o.g.); Milenković 90+6'	Report (FIFA); Report (UEFA)	O. Thill 77'	Stadium: Stadion Rajko Mitić; Attendance: 10,078; Referee: Halil Umut Meler (Turkey)

7 September 2021 2022 FIFA World Cup qualification	Republic of Ireland	1–1	Serbia	Dublin, Republic of Ireland
20:45	Milenković 87' (o.g.)	Report (FIFA); Report (UEFA)	Milinković-Savić 20'	Stadium: Aviva Stadium; Attendance: 25,415; Referee: José María Sánchez (Spain)

9 October 2021 2022 FIFA World Cup qualification	Luxembourg	0–1	Serbia	Luxembourg City, Luxembourg
20:45		Report (FIFA); Report (UEFA)	Vlahović 68'	Stadium: Stade de Luxembourg; Attendance: 2,000; Referee: William Collum (Scotland)

12 October 2021 2022 FIFA World Cup qualification	Serbia	3–1	Azerbaijan	Belgrade, Serbia
20:45	Vlahović 30' (pen.), 53'; Tadić 83' (pen.)	Report (FIFA); Report (UEFA)	Mahmudov 45+2'	Stadium: Stadion Rajko Mitić; Attendance: 5,890; Referee: Erik Lambrechts (Belgium)

11 November 2021 International friendly	Serbia	4–0	Qatar	Belgrade, Serbia
18:00	Lukić 45+2'; Jović 51'; Vlahović 53'; Milinković-Savić 83'	Report		Stadium: Stadion Rajko Mitić; Attendance: 1,000; Referee: Irfan Peljto (Bosnia and Herzegovina)

14 November 2021 2022 FIFA World Cup qualification	Portugal	1–2	Serbia	Lisbon, Portugal
19:45	Sanches 2'	Report	Tadić 33'; Mitrović 90'	Stadium: Estádio José Alvalade; Attendance: 58,873; Referee: Daniele Orsato (Italy)

=== 2022 ===
24 March 2022 International friendly	Hungary	0–1	Serbia	Budapest, Hungary
19:30		Report	Nagy 35' (o.g.)	Stadium: Puskás Aréna; Attendance: 30,000; Referee: Filip Glova (Slovakia)

29 March 2022 International friendly	Denmark	3–0	Serbia	Copenhagen, Denmark
18:00	Mæhle 15'; Lindstrøm 53'; Eriksen 57'	Report		Stadium: Parken Stadium; Attendance: 35,010; Referee: Felix Zwayer (Germany)

2 June 2022 2022–23 UEFA Nations League	Serbia	0–1	Norway	Belgrade, Serbia
20:45		Report	Haaland 26'	Stadium: Rajko Mitić Stadium; Attendance: 9,726; Referee: Paweł Raczkowski (Poland)

5 June 2022 2022–23 UEFA Nations League	Serbia	4–1	Slovenia	Belgrade, Serbia
20:45	Mitrović 24'; Milinković-Savić 56'; Jović 85'; Radonjić 90+2'	Report	Stojanović 30'	Stadium: Rajko Mitić Stadium; Attendance: 10,925; Referee: Jesús Gil Manzano (Spain)

9 June 2022 2022–23 UEFA Nations League	Sweden	0–1	Serbia	Solna, Sweden
20:45		Report	Jović 45+3'	Stadium: Friends Arena; Attendance: 24,123; Referee: Lawrence Visser (Belgium)

12 June 2022 2022–23 UEFA Nations League	Slovenia	2–2	Serbia	Ljubljana, Slovenia
20:45	Gnezda Čerin 48'; Šeško 53'	Report	Živković 8'; A. Mitrović 35'	Stadium: Stožice Stadium; Attendance: 13,782; Referee: Maurizio Mariani (Italy)

24 September 2022 2022–23 UEFA Nations League	Serbia	4–1	Sweden	Belgrade, Serbia
20:45	A. Mitrović 18', 45+1', 50'; Lukić 70'	Report	Claesson 15'	Stadium: Rajko Mitić Stadium; Attendance: 14,122; Referee: Georgi Kabakov (Bulgaria)

27 September 2022 2022–23 UEFA Nations League	Norway	0–2	Serbia	Oslo, Norway
20:45		Report	Vlahović 42'; Mitrović 54'	Stadium: Ullevaal Stadion; Attendance: 24,364; Referee: Mateu Lahoz (Spain)

18 November 2022 International friendly	Bahrain	1–5	Serbia	Riffa, Bahrain
16:30	Yusuf Helal 15' (pen.)	Report	Tadić 8', 50'; Vlahović 51'; Đuričić 87'; Jović 89'	Stadium: Bahrain National Stadium; Attendance: 4,000; Referee: Khalid Alturais (Saudi Arabia)

24 November 2022 2022 FIFA World Cup Group G	Brazil	2–0	Serbia	Lusail, Qatar
20:00	Richarlison 62', 73'	Report		Stadium: Lusail Iconic Stadium; Attendance: 88,103; Referee: Alireza Faghani (Iran)

28 November 2022 2022 FIFA World Cup Group G	Cameroon	3–3	Serbia	Al Wakrah, Qatar
11:00	Castelletto 29'; Aboubakar 63'; Choupo-Moting 66'	Report	Pavlović 45+1'; S. Milinković-Savić 45+3'; A. Mitrović 53'	Stadium: Al Janoub Stadium; Attendance: 39,789; Referee: Mohammed Abdulla Hassan Mohamed (United Arab Emirates)

2 December 2022 2022 FIFA World Cup Group G	Serbia	2–3	Switzerland	Doha, Qatar
20:00	A. Mitrović 26'; Vlahović 35'	Report	Shaqiri 20'; Embolo 44'; Freuler 48'	Stadium: Stadium 974; Attendance: 41,378; Referee: Fernando Rapallini (Argentina)

=== 2023 ===
26 January 2023 International friendly	United States	1–2	Serbia	Los Angeles, United States
04:00	Vazquez 29'	Report	Ilić 43'; Simić 46'	Stadium: BMO Stadium; Attendance: 11,475; Referee: Daneon Parchment (Jamaica)

24 March 2023 UEFA Euro 2024 qualifying	Serbia	2–0	Lithuania	Belgrade, Serbia
20:45	Tadić 16'; Vlahović 53'	Report		Stadium: Rajko Mitić Stadium; Attendance: 21,125; Referee: Lawrence Visser (Belgium)

27 March 2023 UEFA Euro 2024 qualifying	Montenegro	0–2	Serbia	Podgorica, Montenegro
20:45		Report	Vlahović 78', 90+6'	Stadium: Podgorica City Stadium; Attendance: 9,831; Referee: Clément Turpin (France)

16 June 2023 International friendly	Serbia	3–2	Jordan	Vienna, Austria
20:30	Eraković 7'; Joveljić 83', 88'	Report	Al-Mardi 54'; Al-Taamari 67'	Stadium: Franz Horr Stadium; Attendance: 8,854; Referee: Stefan Ebner (Austria)

20 June 2023 UEFA Euro 2024 qualifying	Bulgaria	1–1	Serbia	Razgrad, Bulgaria
20:45	Despodov 47'	Report	Lazović 90+6'	Stadium: Huvepharma Arena; Attendance: 6,700; Referee: Craig Pawson (England)

7 September 2023 UEFA Euro 2024 qualifying	Serbia	1–2	Hungary	Belgrade, Serbia
20:45	A.Szalai 10' (o.g.)	Report	Varga 34'; Orbán 36'	Stadium: Rajko Mitić Stadium; Attendance: 6,924; Referee: Juan Martinez Munuera (Spain)

10 September 2023 UEFA Euro 2024 qualifying	Lithuania	1–3	Serbia	Kaunas, Lithuania
20:45	Paulauskas 45'	Report	A.Mitrović 21', 32', 43'	Stadium: Darius and Girėnas Stadium; Attendance: 8,586; Referee: Sascha Stegemann (Germany)

14 October 2023 UEFA Euro 2024 qualifying	Hungary	2–1	Serbia	Budapest, Hungary
20:45	Varga 20'; Sallai 34'	Report	Pavlović 33'	Stadium: Puskás Aréna; Attendance: 58,215; Referee: François Letexier (France)

17 October 2023 UEFA Euro 2024 qualifying	Serbia	3–1	Montenegro	Belgrade, Serbia
20:45	Mitrović 9', 73'; Tadić 77'	Report	Jovetić 36'	Stadium: Rajko Mitić Stadium; Attendance: 25,884; Referee: Szymon Marciniak (Poland)

15 November 2023 International friendly	Belgium	1–0	Serbia	Leuven, Belgium
20:45	Carrasco 2'	Report		Stadium: Den Dreef; Attendance: 0 Referee: Marian Alexandru Barbu (Romania)

19 November 2023 UEFA Euro 2024 qualifying	Serbia	2–2	Bulgaria	Leskovac, Serbia
15:00	Veljković 17'; Babić 82'	Report	Rusev 59'; Despodov 69'	Stadium: Dubočica Stadium; Attendance: 7,325; Referee: Erik Lambrechts (Belgium)

=== 2024 ===
21 March 2024 International friendly	Russia	4–0	Serbia	Moscow, Russia
17:00 UTC+3	An. Miranchuk 21' (pen.); Osipenko 32'; Al. Miranchuk 55'; Sergeyev 90+1'	Report	Gajić (red card) 21'	Stadium: VTB Arena; Attendance: 23,679; Referee: Arda Kardeşler (Turkey)

25 March 2024 International friendly	Cyprus	0–1	Serbia	Limassol, Cyprus
17:00 UTC+2		Report	Milinković-Savić 7'; Mitrović (penalty missed) 11'	Stadium: AEK Arena; Attendance: 1,938; Referee: Marco Di Bello (Italy)

4 June 2024 International friendly	Austria	2–1	Serbia	Vienna, Austria
19:45 CEST	Wimmer 10'; Baumgartner 13'	Report	Pavlović 35'	Stadium: Ernst-Happel-Stadion; Attendance: 37,800; Referee: António Nobre Portugal

8 June 2024 International friendly	Sweden	0–3	Serbia	Stockholm, Sweden
17:00 CEST		Report	Milinković-Savić 18'; Mitrović 60'; Tadić 70'	Stadium: Friends Arena; Attendance: 46,956; Referee: Jasper Vergoote (Belgium)

16 June 2024 UEFA Euro 2024 Group C	Serbia	0–1	England	Gelsenkirchen, Germany
21:00		Report	Bellingham 13'	Stadium: Arena AufSchalke; Attendance: 48,953; Referee: Daniele Orsato (Italy)

20 June 2024 UEFA Euro 2024 Group C	Slovenia	1–1	Serbia	Munich, Germany
15:00	Karničnik 69'	Report	Jović 90+5'	Stadium: Allianz Arena; Attendance: 63,028; Referee: István Kovács (Romania)

25 June 2024 UEFA Euro 2024 Group C	Denmark	0–0	Serbia	Munich, Germany
21:00		Report		Stadium: Allianz Arena; Attendance: 64,288; Referee: François Letexier (French Football Federation)

5 September 2024 2024–25 UEFA Nations League	Serbia	0–0	Spain	Belgrade, Serbia
20:45	Eraković (yellow card) 5'; Birmančević (yellow card) 43'; Belić (yellow card) 69'	Report	Pérez (yellow card) 21'; Carvajal (yellow card) 27'; Yamal (yellow card) 41'; Le Normand (yellow card) 59'; Olmo (yellow card) 67'; de la Fuente (yellow card) 85'	Stadium: Rajko Mitić Stadium; Attendance: 29,981; Referee: Serdar Gözübüyük (Netherlands)

8 September 2024 2024–25 UEFA Nations League	Denmark	2–0	Serbia	Copenhagen, Denmark
18:00	Grønbæk 36'; Andersen (yellow card) 51'; Kristiansen (yellow card) 59'; Poulsen 61'	Report	Lukić (yellow card) 69'; S. Mitrović (yellow card) 71'; Pavlović (yellow card) 71'	Stadium: Parken Stadium; Attendance: 34,902; Referee: Chris Kavanagh (England)

12 October 2024 2024–25 UEFA Nations League	Serbia	2–0	Switzerland	Leskovac, Serbia
20:45	Elvedi 45+1' (o.g.); A. Mitrović 61'; Nedeljković (yellow card) 71'; Simić (yellow card) 84'; Samardžić (yellow card) 90+3'	Report	Widmer (yellow card) 23'; Elvedi (yellow card) 44'; Embolo (penalty missed) 72'	Stadium: Dubočica Stadium; Attendance: 6,383; Referee: Simone Sozza (Italy)

15 October 2024 2024–25 UEFA Nations League	Spain	3–0	Serbia	Córdoba, Spain
20:45	Laporte 5'; Oyarzabal (yellow card) 7'; Morata (penalty missed) 54' 65'; Baena 77'	Report	Eraković (yellow card) 38'; A. Mitrović (yellow card) 53'; Milenković (yellow card) 54'; Pavlović (red card) 76'; Jović (yellow card) 90+1'	Stadium: Estadio Nuevo Arcángel; Attendance: 20,345; Referee: Daniel Stefański (Poland)

15 November 2024 2024–25 UEFA Nations League A	Switzerland	1–1	Serbia	Zurich, Switzerland
20:45	Amdouni 78'	Report	Terzić 88'	Stadium: Letzigrund; Attendance: 21,115; Referee: Clément Turpin (France)

18 November 2024 2024–25 UEFA Nations League A	Serbia	0–0	Denmark	Leskovac, Serbia
20:45		Report		Stadium: Dubočica Stadium; Attendance: 7,295; Referee: Felix Zwayer (Germany)

=== 2025 ===
20 March 2025 2024–25 UEFA Nations League promotion/relegation play-offs	Austria	1–1	Serbia	Vienna, Austria
20:45	Gregoritsch 37'	Report	Samardžić 61'	Stadium: Ernst-Happel-Stadion; Attendance: 46,400; Referee: João Pinheiro (Portugal)

23 March 2025 2024–25 UEFA Nations League promotion/relegation play-offs	Serbia	2–0	Austria	Belgrade, Serbia
18:00	Maksimović 56'; Vlahović 90+1'	Report		Stadium: Rajko Mitić Stadium; Attendance: 22,112; Referee: José María Sánchez (Spain)

7 June 2025 2026 FIFA World Cup qualification	Albania	0–0	Serbia	Tirana, Albania
20:45		Report (FIFA); Report (UEFA)		Stadium: Arena Kombëtare; Attendance: 20,427; Referee: Davide Massa (Italy)

10 June 2025 2026 FIFA World Cup qualification	Serbia	3–0	Andorra	Leskovac, Serbia
20:45	Mitrović 12', 24', 53' (pen.)	Report (FIFA); Report (UEFA)		Stadium: Dubočica Stadium; Attendance: 7,576; Referee: Aliyar Aghayev (Azerbaijan)

6 September 2025 2026 FIFA World Cup qualification	Latvia	0–1	Serbia	Riga, Latvia
15:00		Report (FIFA); Report (UEFA)	Vlahović 12'	Stadium: Daugava Stadium; Attendance: 6,238; Referee: Julian Weinberger (Austria)

9 September 2025 2026 FIFA World Cup qualification	Serbia	0–5	England	Belgrade, Serbia
20:45		Report (FIFA); Report (UEFA)	Kane 33'; Madueke 35'; Konsa 52'; Guéhi 75'; Rashford 90' (pen.)	Stadium: Rajko Mitić Stadium; Attendance: 39,789; Referee: Clément Turpin (France)

11 October 2025 2026 FIFA World Cup qualification	Serbia	0–1	Albania	Leskovac, Serbia
20:45		Report (FIFA); Report (UEFA)	Rey Manaj 45+1'	Stadium: Dubočica Stadium; Attendance: 4,320; Referee: István Kovács (Romania)

14 October 2025 2026 FIFA World Cup qualification	Andorra	1–3	Serbia	Encamp, Androrra
20:45	López 17'	Report (FIFA); Report (UEFA)	Garcia 19' (o.g.); Vlahović 54'; Mitrović 77' (pen.)	Stadium: Estadi de la FAF; Attendance: 987; Referee: Anastasios Papapetrou (Greece)

13 November 2025 2026 FIFA World Cup qualification	England	2–0	Serbia	London, England
20:45	Saka 28'; Eze 90'	Report (FIFA); Report (UEFA)		Stadium: Wembley Stadium; Attendance: 74,289; Referee: Ivan Kružliak (Slovakia)

16 November 2025 2026 FIFA World Cup qualification	Serbia	2–1	Latvia	Leskovac, Serbia
18:00	Katai 49'; Stanković 60'	Report (FIFA); Report (UEFA)	Gutkovskis 12'	Stadium: Dubočica Stadium; Attendance: 3,894; Referee: Ricardo de Burgos Bengoetxea (Spain)

=== 2026 ===
26 March 2026 International friendly	Spain	3–0	Serbia	Villarreal, Spain
21:00 UTC+2	Oyarzabal 16', 44'; Muñoz 72'	Report		Stadium: Estadio de la Ceramica; Attendance: 20,482; Referee: Luis Godinho (Portugal)

30 March 2026 International friendly	Serbia	2–1	Saudi Arabia	Bačka Topola, Serbia (Note: The match was originally scheduled to be played at the Jassim bin Hamad Stadium, Al Rayyan, but was relocated to Serbia due to the 2026 Iran war.)
18:00 UTC+2	Pavlović 66'; Mitrović 70'	Report (FIFA); Report (UEFA)	Al-Hamdan 8'	Stadium: TSC Arena; Attendance: 4,101; Referee: Balázs Berke (Hungary)

31 May 2026 International friendly	Cape Verde	3–0	Serbia	Lisbon, Portugal
17:00 UTC+2	Pina 11'; Duarte 59'; Benchimol 63'	Report		Stadium: Estádio do Restelo; Attendance: 7,500; Referee: João António Gonçalves (Portugal)

4 June 2026 International friendly	Mexico	5–1	Serbia	Toluca, Mexico
20:00 UTC−6	Johan Vásquez 34'; S. Bukinac 45+3' (o.g.); R. Jiménez 57'; A. Avdić 72' (o.g.); L. Chávez 90'	Report	P. Stanić 19'	Stadium: Estadio Nemesio Diez; Attendance: 27,163; Referee: Keylor Herrera (Costa Rica)

24 September 2026 2026–27 UEFA Nations League	Serbia	1–2	Greece	Belgrade, Serbia
20:45	Živković 4'	Report (FIFA); Report (UEFA)	Tzolis 74'; Douvikas 90+5'	Stadium: Rajko Mitić Stadium; Attendance: 5,701; Referee: Glenn Nyberg (Sweden)

27 September 2026 2026–27 UEFA Nations League	Serbia	1–2	Netherlands	Belgrade, Serbia
18:00	Jović 49'	Report (FIFA); Report (UEFA)	Meerdink 30' (pen.), 69'	Stadium: Rajko Mitić Stadium; Attendance: 15,212; Referee: Szymon Marciniak (Poland)

1 October 2026 2026–27 UEFA Nations League	Germany	2–0	Serbia	Munich, Germany
20:45	Bischof 39'; Wirtz 61'	Report (FIFA); Report (UEFA)		Stadium: Allianz Arena; Attendance: 68,121; Referee: Espen Eskås (Norway)

4 October 2026 2026–27 UEFA Nations League	Netherlands	2–1	Serbia	Eindhoven, Netherlands
20:45	Koopmeiners 31'; Zirkzee 71'	Report (FIFA); Report (UEFA)	Cvetković 35'	Stadium: Philips Stadion; Attendance: 31,387; Referee: Donatas Rumšas (Lithuania)

13 November 2026 2026–27 UEFA Nations League	Serbia	1–3	Germany	Belgrade, Serbia
20:45	Babić 56'	Report (FIFA); Report (UEFA)	Babić 3' (o.g.); Wirtz 14'; Gruda 50'	Stadium: Rajko Mitić Stadium; Attendance: 2,962; Referee: Javier Alberola Rojas (Spain)

16 November 2026 2026–27 UEFA Nations League	Greece	1–0	Serbia	Volos, Greece
20:45 (21:45 UTC+2)	Masouras 69'	Report (FIFA); Report (UEFA)		Stadium: Panthessaliko Stadium; Attendance: 20,960; Referee: Michael Oliver (England)

=== 2027 ===
25/27 March 2027 2026–27 UEFA Nations League promotion/relegation play-offs	v

28/30 March 2027 2026–27 UEFA Nations League promotion/relegation play-offs	v

== See also ==
- Serbia national football team results
- Serbia national football team results (2006–2009)
- Serbia national football team results (2010–2019)
