= Serbia national football team results (2010–2019) =

This article lists the results for the Serbia national football team from 2010 to 2019.

== 2010 ==
3 March 2010 International friendly	Algeria	0–3	Serbia	Algiers, Algeria
19:15		Report	Pantelić 16'; Kuzmanović 55'; Tošić 65'	Stadium: July 5, 1962 Stadium; Attendance: 65,000; Referee: Badara Diatta (Senegal)

7 April 2010 International friendly	Japan	0–3	Serbia	Osaka, Japan
12:20		Report	Mrđa 15', 23'; Tomić 60'	Stadium: Yanmar Stadium Nagai; Attendance: 46,270; Referee: Choi Myung-yong (South Korea)

29 May 2010 International friendly	New Zealand	1–0	Serbia	Klagenfurt, Austria
20:45	Smeltz 22'	Report		Stadium: Wörthersee Stadion; Attendance: 14,000; Referee: Selçuk Dereli (Turkey)

2 June 2010 International friendly	Poland	0–0	Serbia	Kufstein, Austria
20:30		Report		Stadium: Kufstein Arena; Attendance: 4,000; Referee: Dietmar Drabek (Austria)

5 June 2010 International friendly	Serbia	4–3	Cameroon	Belgrade, Serbia
20:30	Krasić 16'; Stanković 25'; Milijaš 44' (pen.); Pantelić 45'	Report	Webó 5', 20'; Choupo-Moting 67'	Stadium: Partizan Stadium; Attendance: 20,000; Referee: Leontios Trattos (Cyprus)

13 June 2010 2010 FIFA World Cup Group D	Serbia	0–1	Ghana	Pretoria, South Africa
16:00		Report	Gyan 85' (pen.)	Stadium: Loftus Versfeld Stadium; Attendance: 38,833; Referee: Héctor Baldassi (Argentina)

18 June 2010 2010 FIFA World Cup Group D	Germany	0–1	Serbia	Port Elizabeth, South Africa
13:30		Report	Jovanović 38'	Stadium: Nelson Mandela Bay Stadium; Attendance: 38,294; Referee: Alberto Undiano Mallenco (Spain)

23 June 2010 2010 FIFA World Cup Group D	Australia	2–1	Serbia	Nelspruit, South Africa
20:30	Cahill 69'; Holman 73'	Report	Pantelić 84'	Stadium: Mbombela Stadium; Attendance: 37,836; Referee: Jorge Larrionda (Uruguay)

11 August 2010 International friendly	Serbia	0–1	Greece	Belgrade, Serbia
20:30		Report	Salpingidis 45'	Stadium: Partizan Stadium; Attendance: 10,000; Referee: Fernando Teixeira Vitienes (Spain)

3 September 2010 UEFA Euro 2012 qualifying Group C	Faroe Islands	0–3	Serbia	Tórshavn, Faroe Islands
19:00		Report	Lazović 14'; Stanković 18'; Žigić 90+1'	Stadium: Tórsvøllur; Attendance: 1,847; Referee: Albert Toussaint (Luxembourg)

7 September 2010 UEFA Euro 2012 qualifying Group C	Serbia	1–1	Slovenia	Belgrade, Serbia
20:30	Žigić 86'	Report	Novaković 63'	Stadium: Stadion Crvena Zvezda; Attendance: 24,028; Referee: Olegário Benquerença (Portugal)

8 October 2010 UEFA Euro 2012 qualifying Group C	Serbia	1–3	Estonia	Belgrade, Serbia
20:30	Žigić 60'	Report	Kink 63'; Vassiljev 73'; Luković 90+1' (o.g.)	Stadium: Partizan Stadium; Attendance: 12,000; Referee: Maksim Layushkin (Russia)

12 October 2010 UEFA Euro 2012 qualifying Group C	Italy	3–0; Awarded (Note: The Italy v Serbia match was abandoned after six minutes due to rioting by Serbian fans. The UEFA Control and Disciplinary Body awarded the match as a 3–0 forfeit win to Italy.)	Serbia	Genoa, Italy
20:50		Report		Stadium: Stadio Luigi Ferraris; Referee: Craig Thomson (Scotland)

17 November 2010 International friendly	Bulgaria	0–1	Serbia	Sofia, Bulgaria
18:00		Report	Žigić 80'	Stadium: Vasil Levski National Stadium; Attendance: 1,500; Referee: Marius Avram (Romania)

== 2011 ==
9 February 2011 International Friendly	Israel	0–2	Serbia	Tel Aviv, Israel
		Report	Tošić 23'; Trivunović 76'	Stadium: Bloomfield Stadium; Attendance: 6,000; Referee: Alexey Nikolaev (Russia)

25 March 2011 UEFA Euro 2012; Qualification Group C	Serbia	2–1	Northern Ireland	Belgrade, Serbia
20:30	Pantelić 65'; Tošić 74'	Report	McAuley 40'	Stadium: Stadion Crvena Zvezda; Attendance: 0 Referee: Serge Gumienny (Belgium)

29 March 2011 UEFA Euro 2012; Qualification Group C	Estonia	1–1	Serbia	Tallinn, Estonia
20:30	Vassiljev 84'	Report	Pantelić 38'	Stadium: Lilleküla Stadium; Attendance: 5,185; Referee: Bas Nijhuis (Netherland)

3 June 2011 International Friendly	South Korea	2–1	Serbia	Seoul, South Korea
	Park 10'; Kim 53'	Report	Petrović 85'	Stadium: Seoul World Cup Stadium; Attendance: 40,000; Referee: Ali Albadwawi (United Arab Emirates)

7 June 2011 International Friendly	Australia	0–0	Serbia	Melbourne, Australia
		Report		Stadium: Docklands Stadium; Attendance: 28,150; Referee: Minoru Tojo (Japan)

10 August 2011 International Friendly	Russia	1–0	Serbia	Moscow, Russia
	Pogrebnyak 53'	Report		Stadium: Luzhniki Stadium; Attendance: 19,131; Referee: Eduard Dumitrescu (Romania)

2 September 2011 UEFA Euro 2012; Qualification Group C	Northern Ireland	0–1	Serbia	Belfast, Northern Ireland
19:45		Report	Pantelić 67'	Stadium: Windsor Park; Attendance: 15,148; Referee: Thomas Einwaller (Austria)

6 September 2011 UEFA Euro 2012; Qualification Group C	Serbia	3–1	Faroe Islands	Belgrade, Serbia
20:30	Jovanović 6'; Tošić 22'; Kuzmanović 69'	Report	Benjaminsen 37'	Stadium: Stadion FK Partizan; Attendance: 7,500; Referee: Arman Amirkhanyan (Armenia)

7 October 2011 UEFA Euro 2012; Qualification Group C	Serbia	1–1	Italy	Belgrade, Serbia
20:45	Ivanović 26'	Report	Marchisio 1'	Stadium: Stadion Crvena Zvezda; Attendance: 35,000; Referee: Pedro Proenca (Portugal)

11 October 2011 UEFA Euro 2012; Qualification Group C	Slovenia	1–0	Serbia	Maribor, Slovenia
20:45	Vršič 45+1'	Report		Stadium: Ljudski Vrt; Attendance: 10,000; Referee: Frank De Bleeckere (Belgium)

11 November 2011 International Friendly	Mexico	2–0	Serbia	Querétaro, Mexico
	Salcido 3'; Hernández 88' (pen.)	Report		Stadium: Estadio Corregidora; Attendance: 34,000; Referee: Walter Lopez (Guatemala)

15 November 2011 International Friendly	Honduras	2–0	Serbia	San Pedro Sula, Honduras
	Bengtson 5', 29'	Report		Stadium: Estadio Olímpico Metropolitano; Attendance: 20,000; Referee: Walter Quesada Cordero (Costa Rica)

== 2012 ==
28 February International Friendly	Armenia	0–2	Serbia	Limassol, Cyprus
		Report	Kuzmanović 15'; Ivanović 29'	Stadium: Tsirion Stadium; Attendance: 100; Referee: Leontios Trattos (Cyprus)

29 February International Friendly	Cyprus	0–0	Serbia	Limassol, Cyprus
		Report		Stadium: Tsirion Stadium; Attendance: 250; Referee: Kevin Blom (Netherland)

26 May International Friendly	Spain	2–0	Serbia	St. Gallen, Switzerland
	Adrián 64'; Cazorla 74' (pen.)	Report		Stadium: AFG Arena; Attendance: 15,625; Referee: Cyril Zimmermann (Switzerland)

31 May International Friendly	France	2–0	Serbia	Reims, France
	Ribéry 11'; Malouda 16'	Report		Stadium: Stade Auguste Delaune; Attendance: 18,000; Referee: Knut Kircher (Germany)

5 June International Friendly	Sweden	2–1	Serbia	Stockholm, Sweden
	Toivonen 23'; Ibrahimović 52' (pen.)	Report	Subotić 27'	Stadium: Råsundastadion; Attendance: 20,691; Referee: Felix Brych (Germany)

15 August International Friendly	Serbia	0–0	Republic of Ireland	Belgrade, Serbia
		Report		Stadium: Stadion Crvena Zvezda; Attendance: 5,000; Referee: Alexandru Tudor (Romania)

8 September 2014 FIFA World Cup; Qualification Group A	Scotland	0–0	Serbia	Glasgow, Scotland
15:00		Report		Stadium: Hampden Park; Attendance: 47,369; Referee: Jonas Eriksson (Sweden)

11 September 2014 FIFA World Cup; Qualification Group A	Serbia	6–1	Wales	Novi Sad, Serbia
20:30	Kolarov 16'; Tošić 24'; Đuričić 37'; Tadić 55'; Ivanović 80'; Sulejmani 90'	Report	Bale 31'	Stadium: Stadion Karađorđe; Attendance: 10,660; Referee: Duarte Gomes (Portugal)

12 October 2014 FIFA World Cup; Qualification Group A	Serbia	0–3	Belgium	Belgrade, Serbia
20:30		Report	Benteke 34'; De Bruyne 68'; Mirallas 90+1'	Stadium: Stadion Crvena Zvezda; Attendance: 21,650; Referee: Pavel Královec (Czech Republic)

16 October 2014 FIFA World Cup; Qualification Group A	Macedonia	1–0	Serbia	Skopje, Macedonia
20:30	Ibraimi 59' (pen.)	Report		Stadium: Philip II Arena; Attendance: 26,181; Referee: Bas Nijhuis (Netherland)

14 November International Friendly	Chile	1–3	Serbia	St. Gallen, Switzerland
	Henríquez 87'	Report	Marković 23'; Đorđević 48'; Đuričić 59'	Stadium: AFG Arena; Attendance: 1,800; Referee: Sascha Kever (Switzerland)

== 2013 ==
6 February 2013 International Friendly	Cyprus	1–3	Serbia	Nicosia, Cyprus
	Makrides 19'	Report	Tadić 23', 47'; Basta 70'	Stadium: GSP Stadium; Attendance: 800; Referee: Athanasios Giachos (Greece)

22 March 2013 2014 FIFA World Cup; Qualification Group A	Croatia	2–0	Serbia	Zagreb, Croatia
18:00	Mandžukić 23'; Olić 37'	Report		Stadium: Stadion Maksimir; Attendance: 35,722; Referee: Cüneyt Çakır (Turkey)

26 March 2013 2014 FIFA World Cup; Qualification Group A	Serbia	2–0	Scotland	Novi Sad, Serbia
20:30	Đuričić 60', 66'	Report		Stadium: Stadion Karađorđe; Attendance: 6,500; Referee: István Vad (Hungary)

7 June 2013 2014 FIFA World Cup; Qualification Group A	Belgium	2–1	Serbia	Brussels, Belgium
20:45	De Bruyne 13'; Fellaini 60'	Report	Kolarov 87'	Stadium: Stade Roi Baudouin; Attendance: 45,844; Referee: Stéphane Lannoy (France)

14 August 2013 International Friendly	Colombia	1–0	Serbia	Barcelona, Spain
	Guarín 89'	Report		Stadium: Mini Estadi; Attendance: 5,000; Referee: Javier Estrada Fernández (Spain)

6 September 2013 2014 FIFA World Cup; Qualification Group A	Serbia	1–1	Croatia	Belgrade, Serbia
20:45	Mandžukić 53'	Report	Mitrović 66'	Stadium: Stadion Crvena Zvezda; Attendance: 30,000; Referee: Felix Brych (Germany)

10 September 2013 2014 FIFA World Cup; Qualification Group A	Wales	0–3	Serbia	Cardiff, Wales
19:45		Report	Đorđević 8'; Kolarov 38'; Marković 55'	Stadium: Cardiff City Stadium; Attendance: 10,923; Referee: Szymon Marciniak (Poland)

11 October 2013 International Friendly	Serbia	2–0	Japan	Novi Sad, Serbia
	Tadić 59'; Jojić 90'	Report		Stadium: Stadion Karađorđe; Attendance: 8,000; Referee: Fırat Aydınus (Turkey)

15 October 2013 2014 FIFA World Cup; Qualification Group A	Serbia	5–1	Macedonia	Jagodina, Serbia
20:30	Ristovski 16' (o.g.); Basta 19'; Kolarov 38' (pen.); Tadić 54'; Šćepović 74'	Report	Jahović 83'	Stadium: Jagodina City Stadium; Attendance: 8,294; Referee: Richard Trutz (Slovakia)

15 November 2013 International Friendly	Serbia	1–1	Russia	Dubai, United Arab Emirates
	Đorđević 31'	Report	Samedov 30'	Stadium: Zabeel Stadium; Attendance: 3,000; Referee: Rashid Al Zarouni (UAE)

== 2014 ==
5 March 2014 International friendly	Republic of Ireland	1–2	Serbia	Dublin, Ireland
	Long 8'	Report	McCarthy 48' (o.g.); Đorđević 60'	Stadium: Aviva Stadium; Attendance: 37,243; Referee: Viktor Kassai (Hungary)

26 May 2014 International friendly	Serbia	2–1	Jamaica	Harrison, New Jersey, United States
	Tadić 13'; Kolarov 22'	Report	Seaton 53'	Stadium: Red Bull Arena (New Jersey); Attendance: 2,000; Referee: Dave Gantar

31 May 2014 International friendly	Serbia	1–1	Panama	Bridgeview, Illinois, United States
	Ivanović 25'	Report	Gómez 60'	Stadium: Toyota Park; Attendance: 3,000; Referee: Marlon Alfonso Mejía (El Salvador)

6 June 2014 International friendly	Brazil	1–0	Serbia	São Paulo, Brazil
	Fred 58'	Report		Stadium: Morumbi Stadium; Attendance: 67,042; Referee: Enrique Cáceres (Paraguay)

7 September 2014 International friendly	Serbia	1–1	France	Belgrade, Serbia
20:45 UTC+2	Kolarov 80'	Report	Pogba 13'	Stadium: Partizan Stadium; Attendance: 12,000; Referee: Wolfgang Stark (Germany)

11 October 2014 UEFA Euro 2016; Qualification Group I	Armenia	1–1	Serbia	Yerevan, Armenia
18:00 UTC+2	Arzumanyan 73'	Report	Tošić 90'	Stadium: Vazgen Sargsyan Republican Stadium; Attendance: 8,500; Referee: Tom Harald Hagen (Norway)

14 October 2014 UEFA Euro 2016; Qualification Group I	Serbia	0–3; Awarded	Albania	Belgrade, Serbia
20:45 UTC+2		Report		Stadium: Partizan Stadium; Attendance: 25,200; Referee: Martin Atkinson (England)

14 November 2014 UEFA Euro 2016; Qualification Group I	Serbia	1–3	Denmark	Belgrade, Serbia
20:45 UTC+2	Tošić 4'	Report	Bendtner 60', 85'; Kjær 62'	Stadium: Partizan Stadium; Attendance: 0 Referee: Cüneyt Çakır, (Turkey)

18 November 2014 International friendly	Greece	0–2	Serbia	Chania, Greece
		Report	Petrović 60'; Gudelj 90'	Stadium: Perivolia Municipal Stadium; Attendance: 4,000; Referee: Neil Doyle (Ireland)

== 2015 ==
29 March 2015 UEFA Euro 2016 qualifying Group I	Portugal	2–1	Serbia	Lisbon, Portugal
20:45 UTC+2	Carvalho 10'; Coentrão 63'		Matić 61'	Stadium: Estádio da Luz; Attendance: 58,430; Referee: Gianluca Rocchi (Italy)

7 June 2015 International friendly	Serbia	4–1	Azerbaijan	Sankt Pölten, Austria
17:00 UTC+2	Ivanović 10', 63'; Ljajić 55'; Marković 89'		Nazarov 39'	Stadium: NV Arena; Attendance: 2,500; Referee: Gerald Lehner (Austria)

13 June 2015 UEFA Euro 2016 qualifying Group I	Denmark	2–0	Serbia	Copenhagen, Denmark
20:45 UTC+2	Y. Poulsen 13'; J. Poulsen 87'	Report		Stadium: Parken Stadium; Attendance: 30,887; Referee: Björn Kuipers (Netherlands)

4 September 2015 UEFA Euro 2016 qualifying Group I	Serbia	2–0	Armenia	Novi Sad, Serbia
20:45 UTC+2	Hayrapetyan 22' (o.g.); Ljajić 53'	Report		Stadium: Karađorđe Stadium; Attendance: 0 Referee: Miroslav Zelinka (Czech Republic)

7 September 2015 International friendly	France	2–1	Serbia	Bordeaux, France
20:45 UTC+2	Matuidi 9', 25'	Report	Mitrović 39'	Stadium: Nouveau Stade de Bordeaux; Attendance: 40,000; Referee: Artur Soares Dias

8 October 2015 UEFA Euro 2016 qualifying Group I	Albania	0–2	Serbia	Elbasan, Albania
20:45 GMT +2		Report	Kolarov 90+1'; Ljajić 90+4'	Stadium: Elbasan Arena; Attendance: 12,330; Referee: Nicola Rizzoli

11 October 2015 UEFA Euro 2016 qualifying Group I	Serbia	1–2	Portugal	Belgrade, Serbia
18:00 GMT +2	Tošić 65'	Report	Nani 5'; Moutinho 78'	Stadium: Partizan Stadium; Attendance: 7,485; Referee: David Fernández Borbalán (Spain)

13 November 2015 International friendly	Czech Republic	4–1	Serbia	Vítkovice, Czech Republic
20:30 GMT +2	Sivok 17'; Necid 63' (pen.); Krejčí 82'; Zahustel 90+3'		Škuletić 78'	Stadium: Městský stadion Attendance: 14,975; Referee: Vladimir Vnuk (Slovakia)

== 2016 ==
23 March 2016 International friendly	Poland	1–0	Serbia	Poznań, Poland
20:45 UTC+2	Błaszczykowski 28'			Stadium: INEA Stadion; Attendance: 38,271; Referee: Alexander Harkam (Austria)

29 March 2016 International friendly	Estonia	0–1	Serbia	Tallinn, Estonia
18:00 UTC+2			Kolarov 81'	Stadium: Lilleküla Stadium; Attendance: 2,858

25 May 2016 International friendly	Serbia	2–1	Cyprus	Užice, Serbia
17:00 UTC+2	Mitrović 2'; Tadić 10'		Ni. Maksimović 32' (o.g.)	Stadium: Užice City Stadium; Attendance: 7,000

31 May 2016 International friendly	Serbia	3–1	Israel	Novi Sad, Serbia
20:10 UTC+2	Ivanović 33'; Milunović 74'; Tadić 88'		Zahavi 49' (pen.)	Stadium: Stadion Karađorđe; Attendance: 10,000

5 June 2016 International friendly	Russia	1–1	Serbia	Fontvieille, Monaco
18:00 UTC+2	Dzyuba 85'		Mitrović 88'	Stadium: Stade Louis II; Attendance: 2,000

5 September 2016 2018 FIFA World Cup qualifying Group D	Serbia	2–2	Republic of Ireland	Belgrade, Serbia
20:45 (20:45 UTC+2)	Kostić 62'; Tadić 69' (pen.)	Report	Hendrick 3'; Murphy 81'	Stadium: Rajko Mitić Stadium; Attendance: 7,896; Referee: Viktor Kassai (Hungary)

29 September 2016 International friendly	Qatar	3–0	Serbia	Doha, Qatar
19:15 UTC+3	Sebastián Soria 24', 30', 43'			Stadium: Jassim bin Hamad Stadium; Referee: Abdulrahman Al-Jassim (Qatar)

6 October 2016 2018 FIFA World Cup qualifying Group D	Moldova	0–3	Serbia	Chișinău, Moldova
20:45 (21:45 UTC+3)		Report	Kostić 19'; Ivanović 37'; Tadić 59'	Stadium: Zimbru Stadium; Attendance: 6,192; Referee: Aleksei Kulbakov (Belarus)

9 October 2016 2018 FIFA World Cup qualifying Group D	Serbia	3–2	Austria	Belgrade, Serbia
20:45 (20:45 UTC+2)	A.Mitrović 6', 23'; Tadić 74'	Report	Sabitzer 16'; Janko 62'	Stadium: Rajko Mitić Stadium; Attendance: 14,200; Referee: Jonas Eriksson (Sweden)

12 November 2016 2018 FIFA World Cup qualifying Group D	Wales	1–1	Serbia	Cardiff, Wales
20:45 (19:45 UTC±0)	Bale 38'	Report	A.Mitrović 85'	Stadium: Cardiff City Stadium; Attendance: 32,879; Referee: Alberto Undiano Mallenco (Spain)

15 November 2016 International friendly	Ukraine	2–0	Serbia	Kharkiv, Ukraine
20:00 (20:00 UTC+2)	Y.Shakhov 38'; Yarmolenko 88'	Report		Stadium: Metalist Stadium; Attendance: 30,000; Referee: Markus Strömbergsson (Sweden)

== 2017 ==
29 January 2017 International friendly	United States	0–0	Serbia	San Diego, United States
22:30				Stadium: Qualcomm Stadium; Attendance: 20,079; Referee: Kevin Morrison (Jamaica)

24 March 2017 2018 FIFA World Cup qualifying Group D	Georgia	1–3	Serbia	Tbilisi Georgia
18:00 (21:00 UTC+4)	Kacharava 6'	Report	Tadić 45' (pen.); A. Mitrović 64'; Gaćinović 86'	Stadium: Boris Paichadze Dinamo Arena; Attendance: 31,328; Referee: Felix Zwayer (Germany)

11 June 2017 2018 FIFA World Cup qualifying Group D	Serbia	1–1	Wales	Belgrade, Serbia
20:45 (20:45 UTC+2)	A. Mitrović 74'	Report	Ramsey 35' (pen.)	Stadium: Rajko Mitić Stadium; Attendance: 46,673; Referee: Jorge Sousa (Portugal)

2 September 2017 2018 FIFA World Cup qualifying Group D	Serbia	3–0	Moldova	Belgrade, Serbia
18:00 (18:00 UTC+2)	Gaćinović 20'; Kolarov 30'; A. Mitrović 81'	Report		Stadium: Partizan Stadium; Attendance: 9,974; Referee: Tamás Bognár (Hungary)

5 September 2017 2018 FIFA World Cup qualifying Group D	Republic of Ireland	0–1	Serbia	Dublin, Ireland
20:45 (19:45 UTC+1)		Report	Kolarov 55'	Stadium: Aviva Stadium; Attendance: 50,153; Referee: Cüneyt Çakır (Turkey)

6 October 2017 2018 FIFA World Cup qualifying Group D	Austria	3–2	Serbia	Vienna, Austria
	Burgstaller 25'; Arnautović 76'; Schaub 89'	Report (UEFA)	Milivojević 11'; Matić 83'	Stadium: Ernst-Happel-Stadion; Attendance: 42,400; Referee: Pavel Královec (Czech Republic)

9 October 2017 2018 FIFA World Cup qualifying Group D	Serbia	1–0	Georgia	Belgrade, Serbia
20:45 (20:45 UTC+2)	Prijović 74'			Stadium: Rajko Mitić Stadium; Attendance: 42,000; Referee: Pawel Gil (Poland)

10 November 2017 International friendly	China	0–2	Serbia	Guangzhou, China
12:35			Ljajić 20'; Mitrović 69'	Stadium: Tianhe Stadium; Attendance: 17,160; Referee: Hettikamkanamge Perera (Sri Lanka)

14 November 2017 International friendly	South Korea	1–1	Serbia	Ulsan, South Korea
12:00	Koo 63' (pen.)		Ljajić 59'	Stadium: Ulsan Munsu Football Stadium; Attendance: 30,560; Referee: Ma Ning (China)

== 2018 ==
23 March 2018 International friendly	Morocco	2–1	Serbia	Turin, United States
20:30 (20:30 UTC+1)	Ziyech 29' (pen.); Boutaïb 40'	Report	Tadić 37'	Stadium: Stadio Olimpico Grande Torino; Attendance: 15,700; Referee: Marco Guida (Italy)

27 March 2018 International friendly	Nigeria	0–2	Serbia	London, England
21:00 (20:00 UTC)		Report	Mitrović 68', 81'	Stadium: The Hive Stadium; Attendance: 3,500; Referee: Craig Pawson (England)

4 June 2018 International friendly	Serbia	0–1	Chile	Graz, Austria
20:00 (19:00 UTC)		Report	Maripán 88'	Stadium: Liebenauer Stadium; Attendance: 2,000; Referee: Alexander Harkam (Austria)

9 June 2018 International friendly	Serbia	5–1	Bolivia	Graz, Austria
18:00 (17:00 UTC)	Mitrović 4', 23', 68'; Ljajić 19'; Ivanović 42'	Report	Campos 48'	Stadium: Liebenauer Stadium; Attendance: 1,572; Referee: Christopher Jäger (Austria)

17 June 2018 2018 FIFA World Cup Group E	Costa Rica	0–1	Serbia	Samara, Russia
16:00 SAMT (UTC+4)		Report	Kolarov 56'	Stadium: Samara Arena; Attendance: 41,432; Referee: Malang Diedhiou (Senegal)

22 June 2018 2018 FIFA World Cup Group E	Serbia	1–2	Switzerland	Kaliningrad, Russia
20:00 KALT (UTC+2)	Mitrović 5'	Report	Xhaka 52'; Shaqiri 90'	Stadium: Kaliningrad Stadium; Attendance: 33,167; Referee: Felix Brych (Germany)

27 June 2018 2018 FIFA World Cup Group E	Serbia	0–2	Brazil	Moscow, Russia
21:00 MSK (UTC+3)		Report	Paulinho 36'; Thiago Silva 68'	Stadium: Spartak Stadium; Attendance: 44,190; Referee: Alireza Faghani (Iran)

7 September 2018 UEFA Nations League C	Lithuania	0–1	Serbia	Vilnius, Lithuania
20:45		Report	Tadić 38' (pen.)	Stadium: LFF Stadium; Attendance: 4,378; Referee: Bobby Madden (Scotland)

10 September 2018 UEFA Nations League C	Serbia	2–2	Romania	Belgrade, Serbia
20:45	Mitrović 26', 63'	Report	Stanciu 48' (pen.); Țucudean 68'	Stadium: Partizan Stadium; Attendance: 15,496; Referee: Vladislav Bezborodov (Russia)

11 October 2018 UEFA Nations League C	Montenegro	0–2	Serbia	Podgorica, Montenegro
20:45		Report	Mitrović 18' (pen.), 81'	Stadium: Podgorica City Stadium; Attendance: 10,700; Referee: Gianluca Rocchi (Italy)

14 October 2018 UEFA Nations League C	Romania	0–0	Serbia	Bucharest, Romania
15:00		Report		Stadium: Arena Națională; Attendance: 48,513; Referee: Kevin Blom (Netherlands)

17 November 2018 UEFA Nations League C	Serbia	2–1	Montenegro	Belgrade, Serbia
15:00	Ljajić 30'; Mitrović 32'	Report	Mugoša 70'	Stadium: Red Star Stadium; Attendance: 15,416; Referee: Alberto Undiano Mallenco (Spain)

20 November 2018 UEFA Nations League C	Serbia	4–1	Lithuania	Belgrade, Serbia
20:45	Žulpa 51' (o.g.); Mitrović 58'; Prijović 71'; Ljajić 74'	Report	Petravičius 64'	Stadium: Partizan Stadium; Attendance: 2,088; Referee: Kristo Tohver (Estonia)

== 2019 ==
20 March 2019 International Friendly	Germany	1–1	Serbia	Wolfsburg, Germany
20:45	Goretzka 69'	Report	Jović 12'	Stadium: Volkswagen Arena; Attendance: 26,101; Referee: Bobby Madden (Scotland)

25 March 2019 UEFA Euro 2020 qualifying Group B	Portugal	1–1	Serbia	Lisbon, Portugal
20:45	Danilo 42'	Report	Tadić 7' (pen.)	Stadium: Estádio da Luz; Attendance: 50,342; Referee: Szymon Marciniak (Poland)

7 June 2019 UEFA Euro 2020 qualifying Group B	Ukraine	5–0	Serbia	Lviv, Ukraine
20:45	Tsyhankov 26', 28'; Konoplyanka 46', 75'; Yaremchuk 59'	Report		Stadium: Arena Lviv; Attendance: 34,915; Referee: Antonio Mateu Lahoz (Spain)

10 June 2019 UEFA Euro 2020 qualifying Group B	Serbia	4–1	Lithuania	Belgrade, Serbia
20:45	Mitrović 20', 34'; Jović 35'; Ljajić 90+2'	Report	Novikovas 70' (pen.)	Stadium: Red Star Stadium; Attendance: 0* Referee: Adrien Jaccottet (Switzerland)
Note: The Serbia v Lithuania match was played behind closed doors due to a UEFA punishment against Serbia for racist behaviour in their UEFA Nations League home match against Montenegro.

7 September 2019 UEFA Euro 2020 qualifying Group B	Serbia	2–4	Portugal	Belgrade, Serbia
20:45	Milenković 68'; A. Mitrović 85'	Report	Carvalho 42'; Guedes 58'; Ronaldo 80'; B. Silva 86'	Stadium: Red Star Stadium; Attendance: 39,839; Referee: Cüneyt Çakır (Turkey)

10 September 2019 UEFA Euro 2020 qualifying Group B	Luxembourg	1–3	Serbia	Luxembourg City, Luxembourg
20:45	Turpel 66'	Report	A. Mitrović 36', 78'; Radonjić 55'	Stadium: Stade Josy Barthel; Referee: Davide Massa (Italy)

10 October 2019 International Friendly	Serbia	1–0	Paraguay	Kruševac, Serbia
20:45	A. Mitrović 90'	Report		Stadium: Mladost Stadium; Attendance: 5,000; Referee: Nejc Kajtazović (Slovenia)

14 October 2019 UEFA Euro 2020 qualifying Group B	Lithuania	1–2	Serbia	Vilnius, Lithuania
20:45	Kazlauskas 79'	Report	A. Mitrović 49', 53'	Stadium: LFF Stadium; Attendance: 2,787; Referee: Paweł Raczkowski (Poland)

14 November 2019 UEFA Euro 2020 qualifying Group B	Serbia	3–2	Luxembourg	Belgrade, Serbia
20:45	A. Mitrović 11', 43'; Radonjić 70'	Report	Rodrigues 54'; Turpel 75'	Stadium: Red Star Stadium; Attendance: 500 (Note: Serbia were sanctioned by UEFA to play one home match (against Luxembourg on 14 November 2019) without spectators for racist behaviour in their home match against Portugal.); Referee: Serdar Gözübüyük (Netherlands)

17 November 2019 UEFA Euro 2020 qualifying Group B	Serbia	2–2	Ukraine	Belgrade, Serbia
15:00	Tadić 9' (pen.); A. Mitrović 56'	Report	Yaremchuk 33'; Besyedin 90+3'	Stadium: Red Star Stadium; Attendance: 3,000; Referee: Bobby Madden (Scotland)

== See also ==
- Serbia national football team results
- Serbia national football team results (2006–09)
- Serbia national football team results (2020–29)
