= Sofija Milošević =

Serbian fashion model

- Софија Милошевић
- Born: March 18, 1991 (age 35); Belgrade, SR Serbia, Yugoslavia
- Years active: 2002–present
- Partner: Luka Jović (2019–)
- Children: 2
- Modeling information
- Height: 1.77 m (5 ft 9 1/2 in)
- Hair color: Blonde

Sofija Milošević (Serbian Cyrillic: Софија Милошевић; born March 18, 1991) is a Serbian fashion model. She worked for Serbian fashion designers and brands Diesel and Jeremy Scott in Milan and New York.

== Personal life ==
Sofija was engaged to Filip Živojinović, son of retired Serbian tennis player Slobodan Živojinović and stepson of Serbian singer Lepa Brena; she was also in relationship with Serbian tennis player Viktor Troicki. She had later been dating Serbian footballer Adem Ljajić for three years until 2018. As of Summer 2019, she is in a relationship with Serbian footballer Luka Jović. They have two children: Aleksej Jović (born 2020) and Teodor Jović (born 2022).
