= 2026–27 AEK Athens F.C. season =

AEK Athens
2026–27 season
- Chairman: Evangelos Aslanidis
- Manager: Marko Nikolić
- Stadium: Agia Sophia Stadium
- Super League: 3rd
- Greek Cup: League phase
- Greek Super Cup: Runners-up
- UEFA Champions League: League phase
- Top goalscorer: League: Barnabás Varga (6); All: Barnabás Varga (10)
- Biggest win: AEK Athens 8–1 Panserraikos
- Biggest defeat: Manchester City 5–1 AEK Athens
Home colours	Away colours	Third colours

The 2026–27 season is the 103rd season in the existence of AEK Athens F.C. and the 66th competitive season and twelfth consecutive in the top flight of Greek football. They compete in the Super League, the Greek Cup, the Greek Super Cup and the Champions League. The season began on 12 August 2026 and will finish on 30 June 2027.

== Kits ==
Supplier: Nike
Sponsor(s): Pame stoixima
Features: Seajets

Home	Away	Third

== Management team ==
Position	Staff
Manager	(Serbia) Marko Nikolić
Assistant manager	(Serbia) Radoje Smiljanić
Assistant manager	(Greece) Ilias Kyriakidis
Goalkeeping coach	(Austria) Christian Dobnik
Fitness coach	(Serbia) Goran Basarić
Fitness coach	(Greece) Kostas Konstantopoulos
Fitness coach	(Greece) Giorgos Papaleontiou
Fitness coach	(Greece) Sotiris Mavros
Director of Football	(Spain) Javier Ribalta
Scout	(Italy) Roberto Malfitano
Scout	(Italy) Francesco Panfili
Academy director	(Greece) Georgios Georgiadis
Academy manager	(Serbia) Ivan Nedeljković
Head of Medical	(Greece) Lakis Nikolaou

- Source: aekfc.gr

== Players ==
=== Squad information ===
NOTE: The players are the ones that have been announced by the AEK Athens' press release. No edits should be made unless a player's arrival or exit is announced. Updated 2 September 2026, 23:59 UTC+3.

No.	Player	Nat.	Position(s)	Date of birth (Age)	Signed	Previous club	Transfer fee	Contract until
Goalkeepers
1	Thomas Strakosha	(Albania) (Greece)	GK	19 March 1995 (age 31)	2024	(England) Brentford	Free	2029
41	Marios Balamotis	(Greece)	GK	6 May 2005 (age 21)	2025	(Greece) AEK Athens Β	—	2027
91	Alberto Brignoli	(Italy)	GK	19 August 1991 (age 35)	2024	(Greece) Panathinaikos	Free	2027
Defenders
2	Harold Moukoudi (Vice-captain 2)	(Cameroon) (France)	CB	27 November 1997 (age 28)	2022	(France) Saint-Étienne	Free	2029
3	Stavros Pilios	(Albania) (Greece)	LB / LM	10 December 2000 (age 25)	2023	(Greece) PAS Giannina	Free	2030
5	Christos Alexiou	(Greece)	CB	30 June 2005 (age 21)	2026	(Italy) Internazionale U23	Free	2027
12	Lazaros Rota	(Greece) (Albania)	RB / RM	23 August 1997 (age 29)	2021	(Netherlands) Fortuna Sittard	Free	2030
15	Martin Georgiev	(Bulgaria)	CB / RB	24 September 2005 (age 21)	2026	(Bulgaria) Slavia Sofia	€2,000,000	2030
21	Domagoj Vida (Vice-captain)	(Croatia)	CB / RB	29 April 1989 (age 37)	2022	(Turkey) Beşiktaş	Free	2027
22	Charalampos Lykogiannis	(Greece)	LB / CB	22 October 1993 (age 33)	2026	(Italy) Bologna	Free	2027
44	Filipe Relvas	(Portugal)	CB / LB	20 September 1999 (age 27)	2025	(Portugal) Vitória Guimarães	€3,500,000	2029
57	Spyros Christakopoulos	(Greece)	RB / CB / LB	21 September 2006 (age 20)	2026	(Greece) AEK Athens U19	—	2029
Midfielders
6	Kaan Kairinen	(Finland) (Turkey)	CM / DM / AM	22 December 1998 (age 27)	2026	(Czech Republic) Sparta Prague	€4,000,000	2030
8	Mijat Gaćinović	(Serbia) (Bosnia and Herzegovina)	AM / CM / LM / LW / RM / RW	8 February 1995 (age 31)	2022	(Germany) Hoffenheim	€1,000,000	2028
14	Lovro Majer	(Croatia)	AM / CM / RM / RW / LM / LW	17 January 1998 (age 28)	2026	(Germany) VfL Wolfsburg	€6,000,000	2030
16	Kervin Arriaga	(Honduras)	DM / CB / CM	5 January 1998 (age 28)	2026	(Spain) Levante	€3,000,000	2030
17	Dimitris Kaloskamis	(Greece)	AM / LM / LW / RM / RW	1 March 2005 (age 21)	2025	(Greece) Atromitos	€1,100,000	2030
18	Răzvan Marin	(Romania)	CM / AM / DM	23 May 1996 (age 30)	2025	(Italy) Cagliari	€1,700,000	2028
20	Petros Mantalos (Captain)	(Greece)	AM / LM / CM / LW / SS / RM / RW / DM	31 August 1991 (age 35)	2014	(Greece) Xanthi	€500,000	2027
23	João Mário	(Portugal) (Angola)	AM / CM / LM / LW / RM / RW	19 January 1993 (age 33)	2026	(Turkey) Beşiktaş	Free	2028
27	Milán Vitális	(Hungary)	CM / DM	28 January 2002 (age 24)	2026	(Hungary) Győr	€2,500,000	2030
80	Hakim Sahabo	(Rwanda) (Belgium)	CM / AM / DM	16 June 2005 (age 21)	2026	(Belgium) Standard Liège	€2,500,000	2029
Forwards
7	Dereck Kutesa	(Switzerland) (Angola)	LW / RW / LM / RM / AM / ST	6 December 1997 (age 28)	2025	(Switzerland) Servette	Free	2028
9	Luka Jović	(Serbia)	ST	23 December 1997 (age 28)	2025	(Italy) AC Milan	Free	2027
10	Oleksandr Zubkov	(Ukraine)	RW / LW / AM	3 August 1996 (age 30)	2026	(Turkey) Trabzonspor	€4,000,000	2030
11	Aboubakary Koïta	(Mauritania) (Belgium)	LW / LM / SS / ST / RW / RM	20 September 1998 (age 28)	2024	(Belgium) Sint-Truidense	€4,000,000	2029
19	Barnabás Varga	(Hungary)	ST	24 October 1994 (age 32)	2026	(Hungary) Ferencváros	€4,500,000	2029
39	Zois Karargyris	(Greece)	ST	18 August 2007 (age 19)	2025	(Netherlands) Jong FC Utrecht	—	2029
90	Zini	(Angola)	ST / SS / LW / LM / RW / RM	3 July 2002 (age 24)	2023	(Angola) 1º de Agosto	€350,000	2029
—	Frantzdy Pierrot	(Haiti) (United States)	ST	29 March 1995 (age 31)	2024	(Israel) Maccabi Haifa	€2,500,000	2027
Left during Summer Transfer Window
29	James Penrice	(Scotland)	LB / LM / CM	22 December 1998 (age 27)	2025	(Scotland) Hearts	€2,300,000	2028
From U19 Squad
31	Giorgos Sarakasidis	(Greece)	GK	1 November 2010 (age 16)	2026	(Greece) AEK Athens U19	—	2029
76	Argyris Argyriou	(Greece)	ST	5 March 2009 (age 17)	2026	(Greece) AEK Athens U19	—	2029

== Transfers ==
=== In ===
==== Summer ====
No.	Pos.	Player	From	Fee	Date	Contract Until	Source
6	MF	(Finland) Kaan Kairinen	(Czech Republic) Sparta Prague	€4,000,000	7 July 2026	30 June 2030	
10	FW	(Ukraine) Oleksandr Zubkov	(Turkey) Trabzonspor	€4,000,000^{[a]}	3 June 2026	30 June 2030	
14	MF	(Croatia) Lovro Majer	(Germany) VfL Wolfsburg	€6,000,000	29 July 2026	30 June 2030	
16	MF	(Honduras) Kervin Arriaga	(Spain) Levante	€3,000,000	17 August 2026	30 June 2030	
22	DF	(Greece) Charalampos Lykogiannis	(Italy) Bologna	Free transfer	20 August 2026	30 June 2027	
23	MF	(Portugal) João Mário	(Turkey) Beşiktaş	Free transfer	2 September 2026	30 June 2028	
27	MF	(Hungary) Milán Vitális	(Hungary) Győr	€2,500,000	6 August 2026	30 June 2030	
57	DF	(Greece) Spyros Christakopoulos	(Greece) AEK Athens U19	Promotion	24 July 2026	30 June 2029	
—	DF	(Greece) Konstantinos Chrysopoulos	(Italy) Mantova	Loan return	1 July 2026	30 June 2028	
—	DF	(Australia) Dimitri Valkanis	(Australia) Brisbane Roar	Loan return	1 July 2026	30 June 2027	
—	MF	(Greece) Christoforos Kolimatsis	(Greece) Hellas Syros	Loan return	1 July 2026	30 June 2029	
—	MF	(Ivory Coast) Hamed Kader Fofana	(Greece) Iraklis	Loan return	1 July 2026	30 June 2029	
—	MF	(Spain) Paolo Fernandes	(Saudi Arabia) Al-Khaleej	Loan return	1 July 2026	30 June 2027	
—	FW	(Argentina) Elián Sosa	(Cyprus) Anorthosis Famagusta	Loan return	1 July 2026	30 June 2028	
—	FW	(Greece) Markos Nino	(Greece) Hellas Syros	Loan return	1 July 2026	30 June 2026	
—	FW	(Haiti) Frantzdy Pierrot	(Turkey) Rizespor	Loan return	1 July 2026	30 June 2027	
—	FW	(Greece) Vasilios Kontonikos	(Greece) PAS Giannina	Loan return	1 July 2026	30 June 2029	

Notes

a. plus €500,000 bonuses and Trabzonspor keeps the 10% of the player's rights.

=== Out ===
==== Summer ====
No.	Pos.	Player	To	Fee	Date	Source
4	MF	(Serbia) Marko Grujić	(Bulgaria) Levski Sofia	End of contract	15 August 2026	
6	MF	(Denmark) Jens Jønsson	(Denmark) AGF	End of contract	2 July 2026	
10	MF	(Portugal) João Mário	(Turkey) Beşiktaş	Loan return	1 July 2026	
13	MF	(Mexico) Orbelín Pineda	(Mexico) Monterrey	€8,000,000	18 July 2026	
22	DF	(Peru) Alexander Callens	Free agent	End of contract	1 July 2026	
34	DF	(Greece) Christos Kosidis	(Greece) Athens Kallithea	End of contract	15 September 2026	
37	MF	(Argentina) Roberto Pereyra	Free agent	End of contract	1 July 2026	
—	DF	(Greece) Konstantinos Chrysopoulos	(Greece) Asteras Tripolis	€400,000	4 July 2026	
—	DF	(Australia) Dimitri Valkanis	(Australia) Brisbane Roar	Free transfer	1 July 2026	
—	MF	(Greece) Christoforos Kolimatsis	(Greece) Asteras Tripolis B	Free transfer	21 July 2026	
—	MF	(Ivory Coast) Hamed Kader Fofana	(Greece) Anagennisi Karditsa	Free transfer	12 September 2026	
—	FW	(Greece) Markos Nino	(Greece) Hellas Syros	Free transfer	27 July 2026	

=== Loan in ===
==== Summer ====
No.	Pos.	Player	From	Fee	Date	Until	Option to buy	Source
5	CB	(Greece) Christos Alexiou	(Italy) Internazionale U23	Free	6 July 2026	30 June 2027	✓	

=== Loan out ===
==== Summer ====
No.	Pos.	Player	To	Fee	Date	Until	Option to buy	Source
19	MF	(Sweden) Niclas Eliasson	(Brazil) Internacional	€300,000	17 August 2026	30 June 2027	✓	
23	MF	(Croatia) Robert Ljubičić	(Austria) LASK	Free	22 July 2026	30 June 2027	✓	
29	DF	(Scotland) James Penrice	(Scotland) Rangers	€500,000	15 August 2026	30 June 2027	✓	
81	GK	(Greece) Angelos Angelopoulos	(Greece) Athens Kallithea	Free	21 July 2026	30 June 2027	✗	
—	MF	(Spain) Paolo Fernandes	(Turkey) Alanyaspor	Free	24 August 2026	30 June 2027	✓	
—	FW	(Argentina) Elián Sosa	(Cyprus) Anorthosis Famagusta	Free	2 July 2026	30 June 2027	✗	
—	FW	(Greece) Vasilios Kontonikos	(Greece) Athens Kallithea	Free	28 July 2026	30 June 2027	✗	

=== Contract renewals ===
No.	Pos.	Player	Date	Former Exp. Date	New Exp. Date	Source
3	DF	(Greece) Stavros Pilios	9 August 2026	30 June 2027	30 June 2030	
8	MF	(Serbia) Mijat Gaćinović	15 July 2026	30 June 2026	30 June 2028	

=== Overall transfer activity ===
==== Expenditure ====
Summer: ▼€19,500,000

Winter: €0

Total: ▼€19,500,000

==== Income ====
Summer: ▲€9,200,000

Winter: €0

Total: ▲€9,200,000

==== Net Totals ====
Summer: ▼€10,300,000

Winter: €0

Total: ▼€10,300,000

== Pre-season and friendlies ==
12 July 2026 Friendly	De Graafschap	1–2	AEK Athens	Wehl
17:10 EEST (UTC+3)	Eijken (yellow card) 15'; Kaninda (yellow card) 37'; Besselink (yellow card) 66'; Mambo 80'; Braem (yellow card) 85'	Report	Koïta (yellow card) 15'; Mantalos (yellow card) 27'; Varga 38', (yellow card) 44'; Zubkov (yellow card) 45+1', (goal) 45+1'; Marin (yellow card) 85'	Stadium: Sportpark "De Grindslag"; Referee: Sander Van Der Eijk (Netherlands)
Note: The match was scheduled for 17:00, but it started with a 10-minuted delay.

15 July 2026 Friendly	AEK Athens	0–0	Vitesse	Loenen
20:00 EEST (UTC+3)	Varga (yellow card) 39'; Koïta (yellow card) 44'	Report		Stadium: Sportpark Lonapark; Attendance: 1,500; Referee: Niels Boel (Netherlands)

18 July 2026 Friendly	AEK Athens	2–1	Groningen	Apeldoorn
15:00 EEST (UTC+3)	Koïta (yellow card) 52'; Relvas (red card) 55'; Zini 77'; Kaloskamis 82'	Report	Willumsson (yellow card) 52'; Zawada 65'	Stadium: Sportpark Wiesel; Referee: Clay Ruperti (Netherlands)

26 July 2026 Friendly	PEC Zwolle	2–3	AEK Athens	Zwolle
16:00 EEST (UTC+3)	Reiziger (yellow card) 35', (goal) 56'; Van Der Haar 50'	Report	Koïta 33', (yellow card) 60'; Varga 68', 87'	Stadium: MAC3PARK Stadion; Attendance: 6,500; Referee: Alex Bos (Netherlands)

29 July 2026 Friendly	AEK Athens	1–2	Samsunspor	Apeldoorn
19:00 EEST (UTC+3)	Eliasson 14'; Gaćinović (yellow card) 45+2'; Georgiev (yellow card) 64'	Report	Tavsan 44'; Jarju 80'	Stadium: Sports Park WWNA; Attendance: Behind closed doors Referee: Wim Bronsvoort (Netherlands)

2 August 2026 Friendly	AEK Athens	3–0	Sint-Truidense	Mill
15:00 EEST (UTC+3)	Pilios 7', 19'; Jović 41'	Report		Stadium: RKSV Juliana Mill; Attendance: Behind closed doors

8 August 2026 Friendly	AEK Athens	4–0	Athens Kallithea	Nea Filadelfeia
20:00 EEST (UTC+3)	Vitális 17'; Gaćinović 49', 51', 70'	Report		Stadium: Agia Sophia Stadium; Referee: Michalis Matsoukas (Euboea)

4 October 2026 Friendly	AEK Athens	2–0	Panetolikos	Elliniko
11:00 EEST (UTC+3)	Mantalos (pen.); Christakopoulos	Report		Stadium: Ellinikon Park; Attendance: Behind closed doors

16 November 2026 Friendly	AEK Athens	3–0	AEL Limassol	Nea Filadelfeia
12:00 EET (UTC+2)	Kutesa 9'; Sahabo 59'; Sioutas 76'	Report	Chinedu (yellow card) 78'	Stadium: Agia Sophia Stadium; Attendance: Behind closed doors Referee: Fotis Daoulas (West Attica)
Note: 70 supporters of AEL Limassol, who held special invitations, were entitled to attend the match. The first half lasted 40 minutes.

== Competitions ==
=== Overall record ===
Competition	First match	Last match	Starting round	Final position	Record							
Competition	First match	Last match	Starting round	Final position	Pld	W	D	L	GF	GA	GD	Win %
Super League	22 August 2026	TBD	Matchday 1	TBD	10	7	2	1	24	6	+18	70.00
Super League Play-offs	TBD	TBD	Matchday 1	TBD	0	0	0	0	0	0	+0	—
Greek Cup	2 September 2026	TBD	League Phase	TBD	3	2	0	1	11	4	+7	66.67
Greek Super Cup	12 August 2026		Final	Runners-up	1	0	1	0	2	2	+0	0.00
UEFA Champions League	18 August 2026	TBD	Play-off round	TBD	6	2	1	3	9	11	−2	33.33
Total					20	11	4	5	46	23	+23	55.00

Last updated: 21 November 2026
Source: Competitions

=== Super League Greece ===
==== Regular season ====
===== League table =====
Pos	Team	Pld	W	D	L	GF	GA	GD	Pts	Qualification or relegation
1	Panathinaikos	10	9	0	1	22	5	+17	27	Qualification for the Championship play-offs
2	Olympiacos	10	7	2	1	16	5	+11	23	Qualification for the Championship play-offs
3	AEK Athens	9	6	2	1	23	6	+17	20	Qualification for the Championship play-offs
4	PAOK	10	6	1	3	19	13	+6	19	Qualification for the Championship play-offs
5	Aris	10	6	1	3	16	17	−1	19	Qualification for the Europe play-offs

Updated to match(es) played on 8 November 2026. Source: Super League Greece
Rules for classification: 1) Points; 2) Head-to-head points; 3) Head-to-head goal difference; 4) Overall goal difference.

===== Results summary =====
Overall								Home						Away					
Pld	W	D	L	GF	GA	GD	Pts	W	D	L	GF	GA	GD	W	D	L	GF	GA	GD
10	7	2	1	24	6	+18	23	5	0	0	19	1	+18	2	2	1	5	5	0

Last updated: 2026-11-21.
Source: Super League Greece

===== Results by Matchday =====
Round	1	2	3	4	5	6	7	8	9	10	11	12	13	14	15	16	17	18	19	20	21	22	23	24	25	26
Ground	H	A	H	A	A	H	A	H	A	H	A	H	A	H	A	H	H	A	A	H	A	H	A	H	A	H
Result	W	D	W	D	W	W		W	L	W	W															
Position	1	5	3	5	3	2	4	3	4	3																

Updated to match(es) played on 21 November 2026. Source: slgr.gr
A = Away; H = Home; W = Win; D = Draw; L = Loss; P = Postponed

===== Matches =====
22 August 2026 1	AEK Athens	4–0	Iraklis	Nea Filadelfeia
20:00 EEST (UTC+3)	Varga 11'; Jović 19', 49'; Vitális (yellow card) 58'; Zini 75'	Report		Stadium: Agia Sophia Stadium; Attendance: 24,381; Referee: Michalis Matsoukas (Euboea); Man of the Match: Luka Jović

30 August 2026 2	A.E. Kifisia	1–1	AEK Athens	Ampelokipoi
21:00 EEST (UTC+3)	Jagne (yellow card) 18'; Sousa (yellow card) 31'; Van Eijma (yellow card) 57' (yellow-red card) 90+3'; Ramírez (yellow card) 63'; Benny 90+7'	Report	Koïta (yellow card) 18'; Varga 63'; Rota (yellow card) 63'	Stadium: Leoforos Alexandras Stadium; Attendance: 805; Referee: Vasilis Fotias (Pella); Man of the Match: Benny

5 September 2026 3	AEK Athens	5–0	Aris	Nea Filadelfeia
21:00 EEST (UTC+3)	Varga 11', 62'; Majer (yellow card) 27'; Rota (yellow card) 40'; Marin 67'; Koïta 75'; Zini 90'	Report		Stadium: Agia Sophia Stadium; Attendance: 27,211; Referee: Alexandros Tsakalidis (Chalkidiki); Man of the Match: Lovro Majer

13 September 2026 4	Asteras Tripolis	1–1	AEK Athens	Tripoli
19:00 EEST (UTC+3)	Bartolo 31', (yellow card) 54'; Kotsiras (yellow card) 90+1'	Report	Majer (yellow card) 4'; Laskaris 21' (o.g.)	Stadium: Theodoros Kolokotronis Stadium; Attendance: 3,533; Referee: Anastasios Papapetrou (Athens); Man of the Match: Alberto Brignoli

20 September 2026 5	Volos	1–2	AEK Athens	Volos
18:00 EEST (UTC+3)	Mendyl (yellow card) 29' (yellow-red card) 90+6'; Furtado (yellow card) 79'; Charalampoglou 80'; Mygas (red card) 90+4'; Neyou (yellow card) 90+9'	Report	Mantalos (yellow card) 6'; Vitális (yellow card) 15'; Jović 61' (pen.), 88', (yellow card) 79'	Stadium: Panthessaliko Stadium; Referee: Fotis Polychronis (Pieria)

10 October 2026 6	AEK Athens	3–0	OFI	Nea Filadelfeia
19:30 EEST (UTC+3)	Rota (yellow card) 34'; Relvas 41'; Moukoudi 83'; Majer (yellow card) 86'; Gaćinović 90+3'	Report	Fountas (yellow card) 34'; Aitor (yellow card) 36' (yellow-red card) 66'	Stadium: Agia Sophia Stadium; Attendance: 30,212; Referee: Giorgos Kokkinos (Chalkidiki); Man of the Match: Dereck Kutesa

16 December 2026 7	Atromitos	v	AEK Athens	Peristeri
19:00 EET (UTC+2)		Report		Stadium: Peristeri Stadium
Note: The match was originally schedulled for 17 October, but was postponed on a request by AEK, due to their consecutive away matches in England for the Champions League against Shakhtar Donetsk and Manchester City.

24 October 2026 8	AEK Athens	5–0	Panetolikos	Nea Filadelfeia
20:00 EET (UTC+2)	Moukoudi 4'; Koïta 23'; Zini 38'; Varga 56' (pen.); Zubkov 90+3'	Report	Opoku (yellow card) 25'; Stajić (yellow card) 45'; Manrique (yellow card) 51'	Stadium: Agia Sophia Stadium; Referee: Vasilios Fitsas (Preveza); Man of the Match: Aboubakary Koïta

1 November 2026 9	Panathinaikos	2–0	AEK Athens	Marousi
19:30 EET (UTC+2)	Tetteh 1'; Andino 49'; Kangwa (red card); Salah-Eddine (yellow card) 90+2'	Report	Rota (yellow card) 30'; Koïta (yellow card) 68'; Moukoudi (yellow card) 69'; Zini (yellow card) 75'	Stadium: Olympic Stadium; Referee: Sven Jablonski (Germany)

8 November 2026 10	AEK Athens	2–1	Levadiakos	Nea Filadelfeia
17:00 EET (UTC+2)	Jović 51' (pen.); Varga 55', (yellow card) 77'; Gaćinović (yellow card) 72'; Marin (red card) 79'; Koïta (yellow card) 90+4'	Report	Cobnan 26'	Stadium: Agia Sophia Stadium; Referee: Dimitrios Moschou (Lasithi)

21 November 2026 11	Kalamata	0–1	AEK Athens	Nikaia
19:30 EET (UTC+2)		Report	Koïta 55'; Jović (yellow card) 78'	Stadium: Neapoli Stadium; Referee: Michalis Matsoukas (Euboea); Man of the Match: Aboubakary Koïta

29 November 2026 12	AEK Athens	v	PAOK	Nea Filadelfeia
21:00 EET (UTC+2)		Report		Stadium: Agia Sophia Stadium

5 December 2026 13	Olympiacos	v	AEK Athens	Piraeus
20:00 EET (UTC+2)		Report		Stadium: Karaiskakis Stadium

13 December 2026 14	AEK Athens	v	Volos	Nea Filadelfeia
19:00 EET (UTC+2)		Report		Stadium: Agia Sophia Stadium

20 December 2026 15	Aris	v	AEK Athens	Thessaloniki
19:30 EET (UTC+2)		Report		Stadium: Kleanthis Vikelidis Stadium

9 January 2027 16	AEK Athens	v	Atromitos	Nea Filadelfeia
19:00 EET (UTC+2)		Report		Stadium: Agia Sophia Stadium

January 2027 17	AEK Athens	v	Kalamata	Nea Filadelfeia
00:00 EET (UTC+2)		Report		Stadium: Agia Sophia Stadium

January 2027 18	Panetolikos	v	AEK Athens	Agrinio
00:00 EET (UTC+2)		Report		Stadium: Panetolikos Stadium

January 2027 19	OFI	v	AEK Athens	Heraklion
00:00 EET (UTC+2)		Report		Stadium: Pankritio Stadium

February 2027 20	AEK Athens	v	A.E. Kifisia	Nea Filadelfeia
00:00 EET (UTC+2)		Report		Stadium: Agia Sophia Stadium

February 2027 21	PAOK	v	AEK Athens	Thessaloniki
00:00 EET (UTC+2)		Report		Stadium: Toumba Stadium

February 2027 22	AEK Athens	v	Asteras Tripolis	Nea Filadelfeia
00:00 EET (UTC+2)		Report		Stadium: Agia Sophia Stadium

February 2027 23	Levadiakos	v	AEK Athens	Livadeia
00:00 EET (UTC+2)		Report		Stadium: Levadia Municipal Stadium

March 2027 24	AEK Athens	v	Olympiacos	Nea Filadelfeia
00:00 EET (UTC+2)		Report		Stadium: Agia Sophia Stadium

March 2027 25	Iraklis	v	AEK Athens	Thessaloniki
00:00 EET (UTC+2)		Report		Stadium: Kaftanzoglio Stadium

March 2027 26	AEK Athens	v	Panathinaikos	Nea Filadelfeia
00:00 EET (UTC+2)		Report		Stadium: Agia Sophia Stadium

=== Greek Cup ===
AEK is set to start the Cup in the League Phase

==== League phase ====
===== Results by Matchday =====
Round	1	2	3	4
Ground	A	H	A	H
Result	W	W	L	
Position	2	1	4	
Points	3	6	6	

A = Away; H = Home; W = Win; D = Draw; L = Loss

===== Matches =====
2 September 2026 1	Nestos Chrysoupoli	0–2	AEK Athens	Chrysoupoli
17:00 EEST (UTC+3)	Cantave (yellow card) 90+2'	Report	Zini 10'; Georgiev 83'	Stadium: Municipal Stadium of Chrysoupoli; Referee: Lefteris Katopis (Samos)

17 September 2026 3	AEK Athens	8–1	Panserraikos	Nea Filadelfeia
17:45 EEST (UTC+3)	Alexiou 9', 84'; Varga 33', 38'; João Mário 35', (yellow card) 47'; Vitális 44'; Mantalos 45+1'; Zubkov 72'; Lykogiannis (yellow card) 89'	Report	Aliatidis (yellow card) 42'; Karasalidis (yellow card) 52'; Iliadis 90+1'	Stadium: Agia Sophia Stadium; Referee: Spyros Zabalas (Epirus)

28 October 2026 4	PAOK	3–1	AEK Athens	Thessaloniki
21:15 EET (UTC+2)	Banza 8'; Shoretire 70'; Ndiaye 79'; Taylor (yellow card) 85'; Giannoulis (yellow card) 88'	Report	Majer (yellow card) 48'; Jović 50'; Zubkov (yellow card) 76'; Zini (yellow card) 90+2'	Stadium: Toumba Stadium; Referee: Angelos Evangelou (Athens)

2 December 2026 5	AEK Athens	v	Asteras Tripolis	Nea Filadelfeia
19:00 EET (UTC+2)				Stadium: Agia Sophia Stadium

=== Greek Super Cup ===
12 August 2026 Final	AEK Athens	2–2 (4–5 p)	OFI	Heraklion
20:00 EEST (UTC+3)	Marin (yellow card) 34'; Jović 38'; Mantalos (yellow card) 90+5'; Zini 90+7'	Report	Apostolakis (yellow card) 43'; Androutsos 69'; Kostoulas 76'	Stadium: Pankritio Stadium; Referee: Anastasios Papapetrou (Athens); Man of the Match: Thanasis Androutsos
	Penalties
	Jović (penalty scored); Majer (penalty scored); Mantalos (penalty scored); Varga (penalty missed); Zini (penalty scored)		(penalty scored) Iseka; (penalty scored) Bouchalakis; (penalty scored) Dickmann; (penalty scored) Athanasiou; (penalty scored) Androutsos

=== UEFA Champions League ===
==== Play-off round ====
The draw for the play-off round was held on 3 August 2026.

18 August 2026 First leg	Levski Sofia (Bulgaria)	0–0	(Greece) AEK Athens	Sofia, Bulgaria
22:00 EEST (UTC+3)		Report		Stadium: Vasil Levski National Stadium; Attendance: 38,976; Referee: Glenn Nyberg (Sweden)

26 August 2026 Second leg	AEK Athens (Greece)	4–0 (4–0 agg.)	(Bulgaria) Levski Sofia	Athens, Greece
22:00 EEST (UTC+3)	Jović 7'; Varga 12', 29'; Marin (yellow card) 51', (goal) 55' (pen.); Pilios (yellow card) 74'; Zini (yellow card) 89'	Report		Stadium: Agia Sophia Stadium; Attendance: 30,500; Referee: Clément Turpin (France)

==== League Phase ====
The draw for the league phase pairings was held on 27 August 2026.

Pos	Team	Pld	W	D	L	GF	GA	GD	Pts
27	(Italy) Napoli	4	1	0	3	6	11	−5	3
28	(Spain) Villarreal	4	1	0	3	8	14	−6	3
29	(Greece) AEK Athens	4	1	0	3	5	11	−6	3
29	(Germany) RB Leipzig	4	1	0	3	5	11	−6	3
31	(Azerbaijan) Sabah	4	1	0	3	4	10	−6	3

Updated to match(es) played on 4 November 2026. Source: UEFA
Rules for classification: League phase tiebreakers

===== Results by Matchday =====
Round	1	2	3	4	5	6	7	8
Ground	H	A	A	H	A	H	H	A
Result	W	L	L	L				
Position	16	20	29	29				
Points	3	3	3	3				

Updated to match(es) played on 4 November 2026. Source: UEFA
A = Away; H = Home; W = Win; D = Draw; L = Loss

===== Matches =====
8 September 2026 1	AEK Athens (Greece)	1–0	(Austria) LASK	Athens, Greece
19:45 EEST (UTC+3)	Marin 21'; Jović (yellow card) 40'	Report	Bogarde (yellow card) 42'; Andrade (yellow card) 80'	Stadium: Agia Sophia Stadium; Attendance: 30,221; Referee: Luís Godinho (Portugal)

14 October 2026 2	Shakhtar Donetsk (Ukraine)	3–1	(Greece) AEK Athens	London, England
22:00 EEST (UTC+3)	Pedrinho 34' (pen.); Marlon (yellow card) 54'; Tobias 80'; Mendoza 86'	Report	Majer (yellow card) 18', (goal) 28'; Moukoudi (yellow card) 42'; Marin (yellow card) 61'; Varga (yellow card) 90'	Stadium: Stamford Bridge; Attendance: 21,119; Referee: Chris Kavanagh (England)

20 October 2026 3	Manchester City (England)	5–1	(Greece) AEK Athens	Manchester, England
22:00 EEST (UTC+3)	Anderson 12'; Foden 34', 65', 76'; Cherki 57'; Gvardiol (yellow card) 59'	Report	Pilios 52'	Stadium: Etihad Stadium; Attendance: 40,042; Referee: Willy Delajod (France)

4 November 2026 4	AEK Athens (Greece)	2–3	(Spain) Real Madrid	Athens, Greece
19:45 EET (UTC+2)	Koïta 12', (red card) 90+5'; Arriaga (yellow card) 34'; Pilios 78'	Report	Bellingham 32'; Cucurella (yellow card) 65'; Mbappé 78'; Valverde 90+2'	Stadium: Agia Sophia Stadium; Attendance: 30,368; Referee: Maurizio Mariani (Italy)
Note: Koïta was shown a red card after the end of the match.

24 November 2026 5	Como (Italy)	v	(Greece) AEK Athens	Como, Italy
22:00 EET (UTC+2)		Report		Stadium: Stadio Giuseppe Sinigaglia

8 December 2026 6	AEK Athens (Greece)	v	(Turkey) Galatasaray	Athens, Greece
22:00 EET (UTC+2)		Report		Stadium: Agia Sophia Stadium

19 January 2027 7	AEK Athens (Greece)	v	(Italy) AS Roma	Athens, Greece
22:00 EET (UTC+2)		Report		Stadium: Agia Sophia Stadium

27 January 2027 8	Borussia Dortmund (Germany)	v	(Greece) AEK Athens	Dortmund, Germany
22:00 EET (UTC+2)		Report		Stadium: Signal Iduna Park

== Statistics ==
=== Squad statistics ===
As of 21 November 2026

No.	Pos	Player	Super League		Super League Play-offs		Greek Cup		Greek Super Cup		Champions League		Total	
No.	Pos	Player	Apps	Goals	Apps	Goals	Apps	Goals	Apps	Goals	Apps	Goals	Apps	Goals
Goalkeepers
1	GK	(Albania) Thomas Strakosha	4	0	0	0	0	0	1	0	3	0	8	0
41	GK	(Greece) Marios Balamotis	0	0	0	0	2	0	1	0	0	0	3	0
91	GK	(Italy) Alberto Brignoli	6	0	0	0	1	0	0	0	3	0	10	0
Defenders
2	DF	(Cameroon) Harold Moukoudi	10	2	0	0	0	0	1	0	6	0	17	2
3	DF	(Albania) Stavros Pilios	10	0	0	0	2	0	1	0	6	2	19	2
5	DF	(Greece) Christos Alexiou	0	0	0	0	2	2	0	0	0	0	2	2
12	DF	(Greece) Lazaros Rota	8	0	0	0	1	0	1	0	6	0	16	0
15	DF	(Bulgaria) Martin Georgiev	2	0	0	0	2	1	0	0	0	0	4	1
21	DF	(Croatia) Domagoj Vida	0	0	0	0	3	0	0	0	0	0	3	0
22	DF	(Greece) Charalampos Lykogiannis	1	0	0	0	2	0	1	0	0	0	4	0
44	DF	(Portugal) Filipe Relvas	10	1	0	0	1	0	1	0	6	0	18	1
57	DF	(Greece) Spyros Christakopoulos	1	0	0	0	2	0	1	0	0	0	4	0
Midfielders
6	MF	(Finland) Kaan Kairinen	5	0	0	0	2	0	1	0	4	0	12	0
8	MF	(Serbia) Mijat Gaćinović	7	1	0	0	1	0	0	0	6	0	14	1
14	MF	(Croatia) Lovro Majer	9	0	0	0	2	0	1	0	6	1	18	1
16	MF	(Honduras) Kervin Arriaga	5	0	0	0	1	0	1	0	4	0	11	0
17	MF	(Greece) Dimitris Kaloskamis	0	0	0	0	3	0	1	0	0	0	4	0
18	MF	(Romania) Răzvan Marin	9	1	0	0	1	0	1	0	6	2	17	3
20	MF	(Greece) Petros Mantalos	9	0	0	0	2	1	1	0	2	0	14	1
23	MF	(Portugal) João Mário	2	0	0	0	2	1	0	0	2	0	6	1
27	MF	(Hungary) Milán Vitális	9	0	0	0	1	1	0	0	3	0	13	1
80	MF	(Rwanda) Hakim Sahabo	0	0	0	0	0	0	0	0	0	0	0	0
Forwards
7	FW	(Switzerland) Dereck Kutesa	7	0	0	0	2	0	0	0	0	0	9	0
9	FW	(Serbia) Luka Jović	10	5	0	0	1	1	1	1	6	1	18	8
10	FW	(Ukraine) Oleksandr Zubkov	6	1	0	0	3	1	0	0	5	0	14	2
11	FW	(Mauritania) Aboubakary Koïta	9	3	0	0	0	0	1	0	6	1	16	4
19	FW	(Hungary) Barnabás Varga	8	6	0	0	1	2	1	0	6	2	16	10
39	FW	(Greece) Zois Karargyris	0	0	0	0	0	0	0	0	0	0	0	0
90	FW	(Angola) Zini	8	3	0	0	3	1	1	1	6	0	18	5
—	FW	(Haiti) Frantzdy Pierrot	0	0	0	0	0	0	0	0	0	0	0	0
Left during Summer Transfer Window
29	DF	(Scotland) James Penrice	0	0	0	0	0	0	0	0	0	0	0	0
From U19 Squad
31	GK	(Greece) Giorgos Sarakasidis	0	0	0	0	0	0	0	0	0	0	0	0
76	FW	(Greece) Argyris Argyriou	0	0	0	0	2	0	0	0	0	0	2	0

=== Goalscorers ===
As of 21 November 2026
The list is sorted by competition order when total goals are equal, then by position and then by squad number.

Rank	No.	Pos.	Player	Super League	Super League Play-offs	Greek Cup	Greek Super Cup	Champions League	Total
1	19	FW	(Hungary) Barnabás Varga	6	0	2	0	2	10
2	9	FW	(Serbia) Luka Jović	5	0	1	1	1	8
3	90	FW	(Angola) Zini	3	0	1	1	0	5
4	11	FW	(Mauritania) Aboubakary Koïta	3	0	0	0	1	4
5	18	MF	(Romania) Răzvan Marin	1	0	0	0	2	3
6	2	DF	(Cameroon) Harold Moukoudi	2	0	0	0	0	2
6	10	FW	(Ukraine) Oleksandr Zubkov	1	0	1	0	0	2
6	5	DF	(Greece) Christos Alexiou	0	0	2	0	0	2
6	3	DF	(Albania) Stavros Pilios	0	0	0	0	2	2
10	44	DF	(Portugal) Filipe Relvas	1	0	0	0	0	1
10	8	MF	(Serbia) Mijat Gaćinović	1	0	0	0	0	1
10	15	DF	(Bulgaria) Martin Georgiev	0	0	1	0	0	1
10	27	MF	(Hungary) Milán Vitális	0	0	1	0	0	1
10	20	MF	(Greece) Petros Mantalos	0	0	1	0	0	1
10	23	MF	(Portugal) João Mário	0	0	1	0	0	1
10	14	MF	(Croatia) Lovro Majer	0	0	0	0	1	1
Own goals				1	0	0	0	0	0
Totals				24	0	11	2	9	46

=== Hat-tricks ===
Numbers in superscript represent the goals that the player scored.

Player	Against	Result	Date	Competition	Source

=== Assists ===
As of 21 November 2026
The list is sorted by competition order when total assists are equal, then by position and then by squad number.

Rank	No.	Pos.	Player	Super League	Super League Play-offs	Greek Cup	Greek Super Cup	Champions League	Total
1	14	MF	(Croatia) Lovro Majer	4	0	1	1	1	7
1	20	MF	(Greece) Petros Mantalos	3	0	4	0	0	7
3	18	MF	(Romania) Răzvan Marin	4	0	1	1	0	6
4	27	MF	(Hungary) Milán Vitális	2	0	0	0	0	2
4	8	MF	(Serbia) Mijat Gaćinović	2	0	0	0	0	2
4	23	MF	(Portugal) João Mário	1	0	1	0	0	2
4	12	DF	(Greece) Lazaros Rota	1	0	0	0	1	2
4	3	DF	(Greece) Stavros Pilios	1	0	0	0	1	2
4	11	FW	(Mauritania) Aboubakary Koïta	1	0	0	0	1	2
10	57	DF	(Greece) Spyros Christakopoulos	0	0	1	0	0	1
10	16	MF	(Honduras) Kervin Arriaga	0	0	1	0	0	1
10	10	FW	(Ukraine) Oleksandr Zubkov	0	0	1	0	0	1
10	44	DF	(Portugal) Filipe Relvas	0	0	0	0	1	1
10	90	FW	(Angola) Zini	0	0	0	0	1	1
10	9	FW	(Serbia) Luka Jović	0	0	0	0	1	1
Totals				19	0	10	2	7	38

=== Clean sheets ===
As of 21 November 2026
The list is sorted by competition order when total clean sheets are equal and then by squad number. Clean sheets in games where both goalkeepers participated are awarded to the goalkeeper who started the game. Goalkeepers with no appearances are not included.

Rank	No.	Player	Super League	Super League Play-offs	Greek Cup	Greek Super Cup	Champions League	Total
1	1	(Albania) Thomas Strakosha	3	0	0	0	2	5
2	91	(Italy) Alberto Brignoli	2	0	1	0	1	4
3	41	(Greece) Marios Balamotis	0	0	0	0	0	0
Totals			5	0	1	0	3	9

=== Disciplinary record ===
As of 21 November 2026

N	P	Nat.	Name	Super League			Super League Play-offs			Greek Cup			Greek Super Cup			Champions League			Total			Notes
N	P	Nat.	Name	Yellow card	Second yellow card	Red card	Yellow card	Second yellow card	Red card	Yellow card	Second yellow card	Red card	Yellow card	Second yellow card	Red card	Yellow card	Second yellow card	Red card	Yellow card	Second yellow card	Red card	Notes
Goalkeepers
1	GK	(Albania)	Thomas Strakosha																			
41	GK	(Greece)	Marios Balamotis																			
91	GK	(Italy)	Alberto Brignoli																			
Defenders
2	DF	(Cameroon)	Harold Moukoudi	1												1			2			
3	DF	(Albania)	Stavros Pilios													1			1			
5	DF	(Greece)	Christos Alexiou																			
12	DF	(Greece)	Lazaros Rota	4															4			
15	DF	(Bulgaria)	Martin Georgiev																			
21	DF	(Croatia)	Domagoj Vida																			
22	DF	(Greece)	Charalampos Lykogiannis							1									1			
44	DF	(Portugal)	Filipe Relvas																			
57	DF	(Greece)	Spyros Christakopoulos																			
Midfielders
6	MF	(Finland)	Kaan Kairinen																			
8	MF	(Serbia)	Mijat Gaćinović	1															1			
14	MF	(Croatia)	Lovro Majer	3						1						1			5			
16	MF	(Honduras)	Kervin Arriaga													1			1			
17	MF	(Greece)	Dimitris Kaloskamis																			
18	MF	(Romania)	Răzvan Marin			1							1			2			3		1	
20	MF	(Greece)	Petros Mantalos	1									1						2			
23	MF	(Portugal)	João Mário							1									1			
27	MF	(Hungary)	Milán Vitális	2															2			
80	MF	(Rwanda)	Hakim Sahabo																			
Forwards
7	FW	(Switzerland)	Dereck Kutesa																			
9	FW	(Serbia)	Luka Jović	2												1			3			
10	FW	(Ukraine)	Oleksandr Zubkov							1									1			
11	FW	(Mauritania)	Aboubakary Koïta	3														1	3		1	
19	FW	(Hungary)	Barnabás Varga	1												1			2			
39	FW	(Greece)	Zois Karargyris																			
90	FW	(Angola)	Zini	1						1						1			3			
—	FW	(Haiti)	Frantzdy Pierrot													1			1			
Left during Summer Transfer Window
29	DF	(Scotland)	James Penrice																			
From U19 Squad
31	GK	(Greece)	Giorgos Sarakasidis																			
76	FW	(Greece)	Argyris Argyriou																			

== Awards ==
Player	Pos.	Award	Source
(Serbia) Luka Jović	FW	Stoiximan Best Goal (1st Matchday)	
(Romania) Răzvan Marin	MF	Stoiximan Player of the Month (August)	
(Hungary) Barnabás Varga	FW	Stoiximan Best Goal (3rd Matchday)	
(Serbia) Luka Jović	FW	Stoiximan Player of the Month (September)	
(Mauritania) Aboubakary Koïta	FW	Stoiximan Best Goal (8th Matchday)	
(Cameroon) Harold Moukoudi	DF	Stoiximan Player of the Month (October)	
