= Martin Georgiev =

Bulgarian footballer (born 2005)

Personal information
- Full name: Martin Pavlov Georgiev
- Date of birth: 24 September 2005 (age 21)
- Place of birth: Sofia, Bulgaria
- Height: 1.84 m (6 ft 0 in)
- Position: Defender

Team information
- Current team: AEK Athens
- Number: 15

Youth career
- 2015–2021: Slavia Sofia
- 2022–2023: → Barcelona (loan)

Senior career*
Years	Team	Apps	(Gls)
2021–2022	Slavia Sofia II	17	(0)
2021–2025	Slavia Sofia	85	(3)
2026–	AEK Athens	2	(0)

International career^{‡}
2021–2022	Bulgaria U17	11	(2)
2021–2023	Bulgaria U19	15	(2)
2022–	Bulgaria U21	14	(0)
2025–	Bulgaria	4	(0)
- * Club domestic league appearances and goals as of 22 February 2026 ‡ National team caps and goals as of 30 March 2026

Martin Pavlov Georgiev (Bulgarian: Мартин Павлов Георгиев; born 24 September 2005) is a Bulgarian professional footballer who plays as a defender for Super League Greece club AEK Athens and the Bulgaria national team.

He was included in The Guardian's "Next Generation" list for 2022.

== Club career ==
Born in Sofia, Georgiev started his career at the local club Slavia. He made his professional debut for the team on 11 November 2021 in a league match against CSKA Sofia. One week later, he played his second league match against Ludogorets, but was sent off with a straight red after a heavy foul. In May 2022, it was reported that Barcelona were interested in signing Martin. On June 1, Slavia's owner, Ventseslav Stefanov, announced that the deal was almost completed and Martin would sign with Barcelona for 2 years, however, the final agreement between the two clubs ended up being a one-year loan deal with Barcelona's Juvenil A team.

On 15 July 2022, Georgiev joined Barcelona Juvenil A on loan with an option to buy. In September of the same year, he was named by English newspaper The Guardian as one of the best players born in 2005 worldwide. On 4 July 2023, Slavia announced his return to the team from Barça following the completion of his loan.

== International career ==
Georgiev represented Bulgaria U17 at the 2022 UEFA European Under-17 Championship where the team finished last in the group stage. On 14 October 2025, he earned his first cap for the senior national team, playing the full 90 minutes and conceding a last-minute penalty in the 0–4 away loss against Spain in a 2026 World Cup qualifier.

== Career statistics ==
As of match played 8 September 2026

Club	Season	League			National cup (Note: Includes Bulgarian Cup, Greek Football Cup)		Continental		Other		Total	
Club	Season	Division	Apps	Goals	Apps	Goals	Apps	Goals	Apps	Goals	Apps	Goals
Slavia Sofia	2021–22	Bulgarian First League	5	0	1	0	—		1 (Note: Appearances in Parva Liga Championship group)	0	7	0
Slavia Sofia	2023–24	Bulgarian First League	20	2	1	0	—		6 (Note: Appearances in Parva Liga Relegation group)	0	27	2
Slavia Sofia	2024–25	Bulgarian First League	29	1	1	0	—		7	0	37	1
Slavia Sofia	2025–26	Bulgarian First League	18	0	2	1	—		—		20	1
Slavia Sofia	Total		72	3	5	1	—		14	0	91	4
AEK Athens	2025–26	Super League Greece	2	0	0	0	0	0	—		2	0
AEK Athens	2026–27	Super League Greece	0	0	1	1	0	0	0	0	1	1
AEK Athens	Total		2	0	1	1	0	0	0	0	3	1
Career total			74	3	6	2	0	0	14	0	94	5

== Honours ==
AEK Athens

- Super League Greece: 2025–26
