= Răzvan Marin =

Romanian footballer (born 1996)

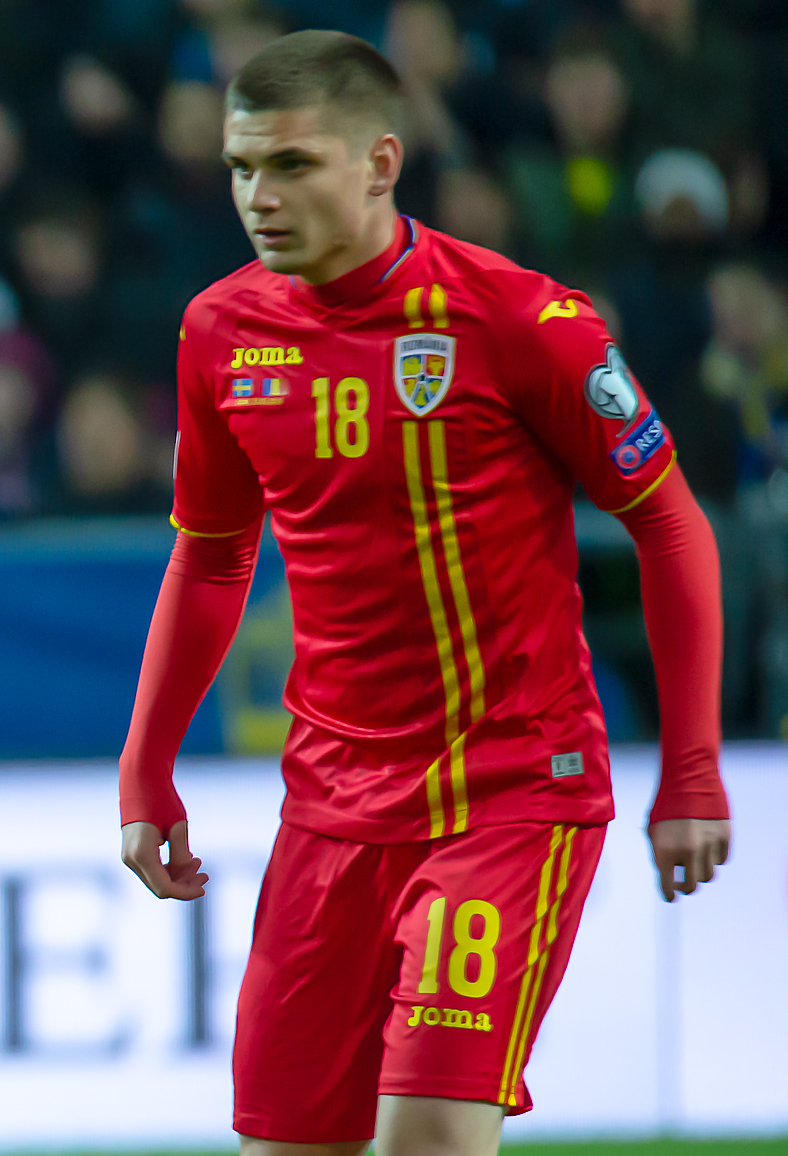
- Marin with Romania in 2019

Personal information
- Full name: Răzvan Gabriel Marin
- Date of birth: 23 May 1996 (age 30)
- Place of birth: Bucharest, Romania
- Height: 1.78 m (5 ft 10 in)
- Position: Midfielder

Team information
- Current team: AEK Athens
- Number: 18

Youth career
- 2002–2009: Pro Luceafărul București
- 2009–2013: Gheorghe Hagi Academy

Senior career*
Years	Team	Apps	(Gls)
2013–2016	Viitorul Constanța	75	(8)
2017–2019	Standard Liège	89	(16)
2019–2021	Ajax	10	(0)
2020–2021	→ Cagliari (loan)	37	(3)
2021–2025	Cagliari	69	(3)
2022–2024	→ Empoli (loan)	63	(2)
2025–	AEK Athens	40	(4)

International career^{‡}
2012	Romania U17	3	(1)
2014	Romania U19	4	(1)
2015–2017	Romania U21	7	(0)
2016–	Romania	79	(12)
- * Club domestic league appearances and goals as of 8 November 2026 ‡ National team caps and goals as of 17 November 2026

Răzvan Gabriel Marin (Romanian pronunciation: [rəzˈvan ɡabriˈel maˈrin]; born 23 May 1996) is a Romanian professional footballer who plays as a midfielder for Super League Greece club AEK Athens and the Romania national team.

Marin began his senior career with Viitorul Constanța at age 17, quickly establishing himself as a first-team regular. His performances earned him a move abroad to Standard Liège at the start of 2017, where he won the Belgian Cup in his first full season. In 2019, he transferred to Dutch team Ajax for a reported fee of €12.5 million, but did not impose himself and joined Cagliari on an initial loan.

Marin made his senior international debut for Romania in October 2016, after having previously played for the country at several youth levels. He represented the nation in the UEFA Euro 2024, where they advanced to the round of 16 as group winners.

== Club career ==
=== Early career and Viitorul Constanța ===
Born in Bucharest, Marin started playing football at the age of six with local Pro Luceafărul, and joined the academy of Viitorul Constanța seven years later. He made his professional debut for the latter club on 18 October 2013, in a 0–4 Liga I away loss to Steaua București.

Marin scored his first league goal in a 2–1 away victory over CFR Cluj, on 15 March 2015. In December 2016, aged only 20, daily newspaper Gazeta Sporturilor announced that he came third for the 2016 Romanian Footballer of the Year award. During his spell in Constanța, Marin amassed competitive totals of 85 games and ten goals.

=== Standard Liège ===
On 20 January 2017, Marin signed a four-and-a-half-year contract with Belgian side Standard Liège. Romanian press had initially reported the transfer value at €2.4 million, with Viitorul retaining undisclosed interest on the capital gain of a potential future transfer. He made his first Belgian First Division A appearance two days later, coming on as an 80th-minute substitute in a 0–3 loss to Club Brugge at the Stade Maurice Dufrasne.

On 8 April 2017, Marin scored his first goal for Les Rouches in a 2–2 league draw with Sint-Truiden. On 20 September, he netted once and also provided an assist in a 4–0 victory over Heist for the Belgian Cup; in December, he scored in league fixtures against Waasland-Beveren, Sint-Truiden and Kortrijk respectively. On 3 February 2018, Marin scored the final goal of a 3–0 success over Lokeren only two minutes after replacing Gojko Cimirot. One month later, he assisted all of his team's goals as they won 3–2 against Mechelen, a home game where he also missed a late penalty. On 17 March, he was a starter in the 1–0 win for the Belgian Cup Final against Genk.

Standard played league winner Club Brugge in the Belgian Super Cup on 22 July 2018, with Marin being once again in the starting eleven, however his team lost the match 1–2. He recorded his first European appearance for Standard in the UEFA Champions League's third qualifying round 2–2 home draw with Dutch side Ajax, on 7 August. Marin then played all six matches in the group stage of the UEFA Europa League, as his team finished third behind Sevilla and FC Krasnodar. Marin's good display throughout the year earned him the Romanian Footballer of the Year award at the 2018 Gala Fotbalului Românesc, on 3 December. On the 21st that month, he finished second for the same trophy awarded by the Gazeta Sporturilor newspaper. Marin netted the first goal of 2019 on 3 February, in an eventual 2–1 victory against rivals Anderlecht.

=== Ajax ===
On 4 April 2019, it was announced that Ajax signed Marin on a five-year deal for a reported transfer fee of €12.5 million, with the player due to join the squad in the summer. At the time, the sum was the third-highest ever paid by the Dutch club.

=== Cagliari ===
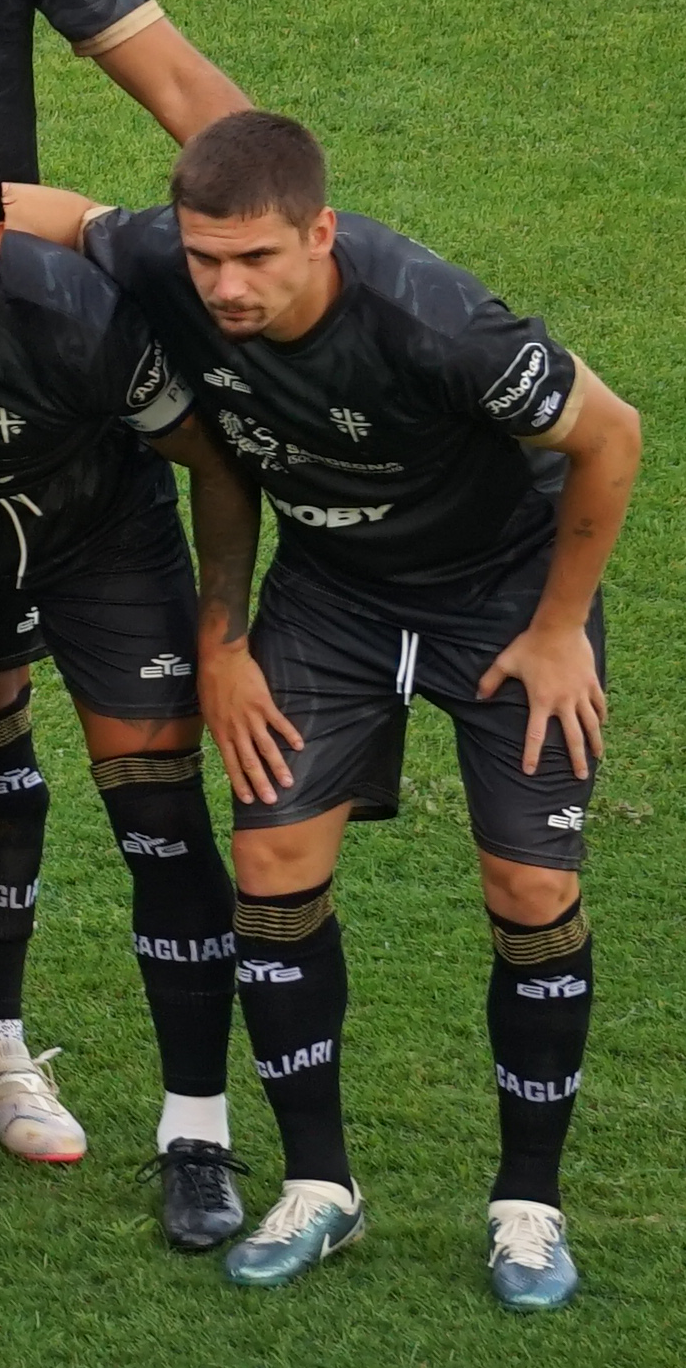
Marin with Cagliari in 2024

On 31 August 2020, Marin joined Italian Serie A club Cagliari on loan with an obligation to buy. On 1 July 2021, the deal was made permanent and Marin signed a contract that would keep him at the team until 2024. The club paid €10 million for the full transfer.

In the first game of the 2021–22 season, he opened up the scoring in an eventual 3–1 win in the Coppa Italia against Pisa.

=== Empoli ===
On 5 July 2022, Marin joined Empoli on a season-long loan with an option to buy. On 29 June 2023, his contract was redeemed by Empoli for €5 million.

=== AEK Athens ===
On 23 July 2025, Marin joined Greek club AEK Athens.

== International career ==
In September 2016, 20-year-old Marin was selected in Romania's senior squad for a 2018 FIFA World Cup qualifier against Montenegro. On 8 October, for the same competition, he earned his first cap and scored a goal in a 5–0 away victory over Armenia.

On 7 June 2024, Marin was named in Romania's squad for the UEFA Euro 2024. Ten days later, he scored a goal in a 3–0 win over Ukraine in the opening group match, contributing to his country's first victory in the competition in 24 years. On 26 June, Marin converted a penalty in a 1–1 draw with Slovakia, securing Romania first place in its group. He started in all four matches, with Romania eventually losing 0–3 to the Netherlands in the round of 16.

== Style of play ==
Marin is usually deployed as either a central or a defensive midfielder, although he is also capable of playing in a more advanced position as an attacking midfielder.

== Personal life ==
Marin's father, Petre, was also a Romanian international. A full-back, he played for Steaua București and Național București among others.

== Career statistics ==
=== Club ===
As of match played 8 November 2026

Appearances and goals by club, season and competition
Club	Season	League			National cup (Note: Includes Cupa României, Belgian Cup, KNVB Cup, Coppa Italia, Greek Cup)		League cup (Note: Includes Cupa Ligii)		Continental		Other		Total	
Club	Season	Division	Apps	Goals	Apps	Goals	Apps	Goals	Apps	Goals	Apps	Goals	Apps	Goals
Viitorul Constanța	2013–14	Liga I	10	0	0	0	—		—		—		10	0
Viitorul Constanța	2014–15	Liga I	17	1	2	0	2	0	—		—		21	1
Viitorul Constanța	2015–16	Liga I	28	3	3	1	1	0	—		—		32	4
Viitorul Constanța	2016–17	Liga I	20	4	0	0	0	0	2 (Note: Appearances in UEFA Europa League)	0	—		22	4
Viitorul Constanța	Total		75	8	5	1	3	0	2	0	—		85	9
Standard Liège	2016–17	Belgian First Division A	18	2	—		—		—		—		18	2
Standard Liège	2017–18	Belgian First Division A	33	4	6	2	—		—		—		39	6
Standard Liège	2018–19	Belgian First Division A	38	10	0	0	—		8 (Note: Two appearances in UEFA Champions League, six appearances in UEFA Europa League)	0	1 (Note: Appearance in Belgian Super Cup)	0	47	10
Standard Liège	Total		89	16	6	2	—		8	0	1	0	104	18
Ajax	2019–20	Eredivisie	10	0	2	0	—		4 (Note: Appearances in UEFA Champions League)	0	1 (Note: Appearance in Johan Cruyff Shield)	0	17	0
Cagliari (loan)	2020–21	Serie A	37	3	2	0	—		—		—		39	3
Cagliari	2021–22	Serie A	36	0	1	1	—		—		—		37	1
Cagliari	2024–25	Serie A	33	3	2	0	—		—		—		35	3
Cagliari	Total		69	3	3	1	—		—		—		72	4
Empoli (loan)	2022–23	Serie A	33	2	1	0	—		—		—		34	2
Empoli (loan)	2023–24	Serie A	30	0	1	0	—		—		—		31	0
Empoli (loan)	Total		63	2	2	0	—		—		—		65	2
AEK Athens	2025–26	Super League Greece	31	3	2	0	—		15 (Note: Appearances in UEFA Conference League)	4	—		48	7
AEK Athens	2026–27	Super League Greece	9	1	0	0	—		3	2	1 (Note: Appearances in Greek Super Cup)	0	13	3
AEK Athens	Total		40	4	2	0	—		18	6	1	0	61	10
Career total			383	36	22	4	3	0	32	6	3	0	443	46

=== International ===
As of match played 17 November 2026

Appearances and goals by national team and year
National team	Year	Apps	Goals
Romania	2016	4	1
Romania	2017	5	0
Romania	2018	5	0
Romania	2019	7	0
Romania	2020	4	1
Romania	2021	11	0
Romania	2022	8	0
Romania	2023	8	1
Romania	2024	13	8
Romania	2025	7	1
Romania	2026	7	0
Total		79	12

Scores and results list Romania's goal tally first, score column indicates score after each Marin goal.

List of international goals scored by Răzvan Marin
No.	Date	Venue	Cap	Opponent	Score	Result	Competition
1	8 October 2016	Vazgen Sargsyan, Yerevan, Armenia	1	Armenia	3–0	5–0	2018 FIFA World Cup qualification
2	11 November 2020	Stadionul Ilie Oană, Ploiești, Romania	24	Belarus	2–0	5–3	Friendly
3	15 October 2023	Arena Națională, Bucharest, Romania	50	Andorra	3–0	4–0	UEFA Euro 2024 qualifying
4	17 June 2024	Allianz Arena, Munich, Germany	56	Ukraine	2–0	3–0	UEFA Euro 2024
5	26 June 2024	Waldstadion, Frankfurt, Germany	58	Slovakia	1–1	1–1	UEFA Euro 2024
6	6 September 2024	Fadil Vokrri Stadium, Pristina, Kosovo	60	Kosovo	2–0	3–0	2024–25 UEFA Nations League C
7	9 September 2024	Steaua Stadium, Bucharest, Romania	61	Lithuania	2–1	3–1	2024–25 UEFA Nations League C
8	12 October 2024	AEK Arena – Georgios Karapatakis, Larnaca, Cyprus	62	Cyprus	2–0	3–0	2024–25 UEFA Nations League C
9	15 October 2024	Darius and Girėnas Stadium, Kaunas, Lithuania	63	Lithuania	1–1	2–1	2024–25 UEFA Nations League C
10	18 November 2024	Arena Națională, Bucharest, Romania	65	Cyprus	2–0	4–1	2024–25 UEFA Nations League C
11	18 November 2024	Arena Națională, Bucharest, Romania	65	Cyprus	3–1	4–1	2024–25 UEFA Nations League C
12	24 March 2025	San Marino Stadium, Serravalle, San Marino	67	San Marino	3–0	5–1	2026 FIFA World Cup qualification

== Honours ==
Viitorul Constanța

- Liga I: 2016–17

Standard Liège

- Belgian Cup: 2017–18
- Belgian Super Cup runner-up: 2018

Ajax

- Johan Cruyff Shield: 2019

AEK Athens

- Super League Greece: 2025–26
- Greek Super Cup runner-up: 2026

Individual

- Gazeta Sporturilor Romanian Footballer of the Year runner-up: 2018; third place: 2016, 2024; fifth place: 2021
- Gala Fotbalului Românesc Romanian Footballer of the Year: 2018
