= Luka Jović =

Serbian footballer

Luka Jović Лука Јовић
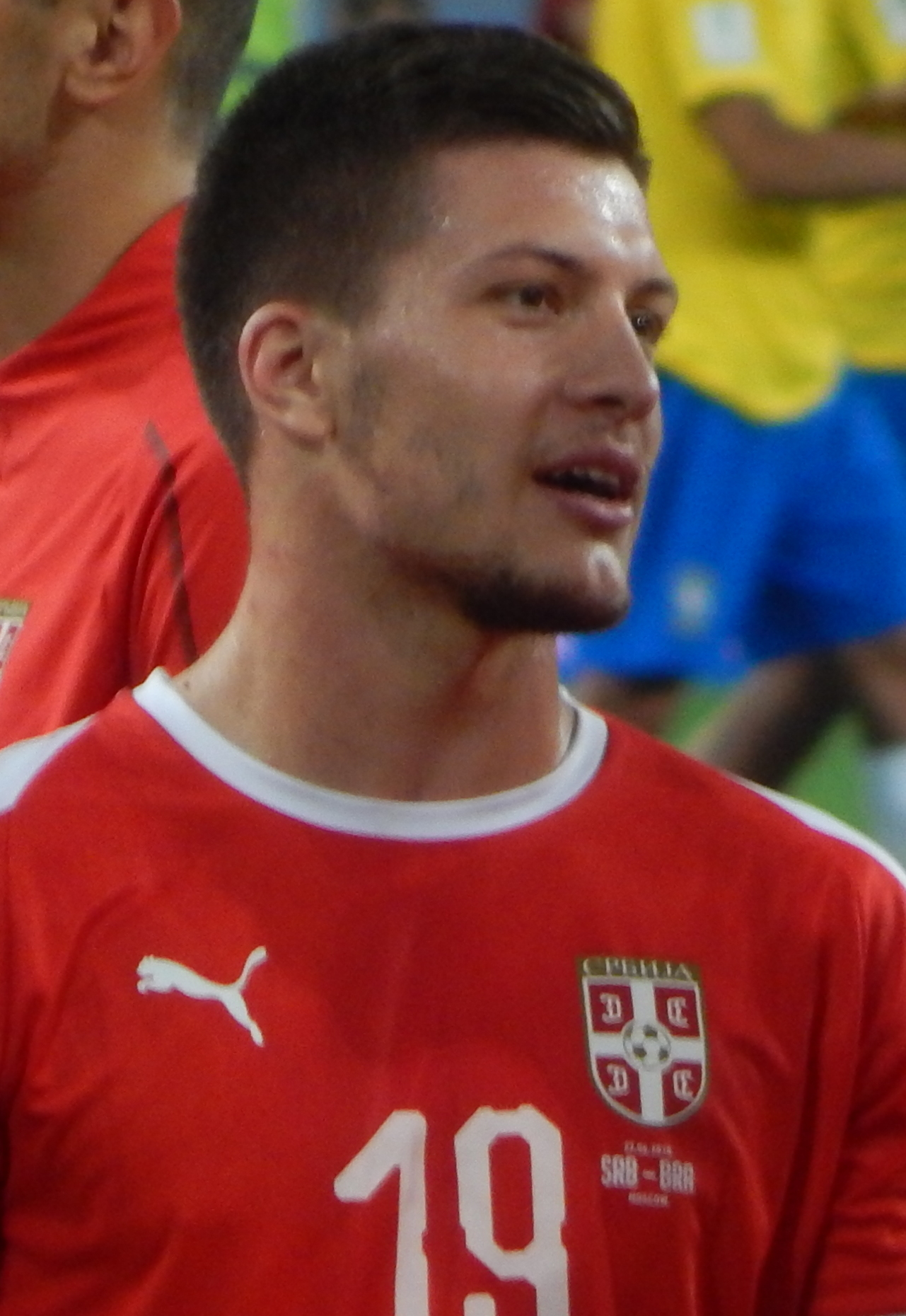
- Jović with Serbia at the 2018 FIFA World Cup

Personal information
- Full name: Luka Jović
- Date of birth: 23 December 1997 (age 28)
- Place of birth: Loznica, Serbia, FR Yugoslavia
- Height: 1.82 m (6 ft 0 in)
- Position: Striker

Team information
- Current team: AEK Athens
- Number: 9

Youth career
- 2005–2014: Red Star Belgrade

Senior career*
Years	Team	Apps	(Gls)
2014–2016	Red Star Belgrade	42	(12)
2016–2019	Benfica	2	(0)
2016–2017	→ Benfica B (loan)	18	(4)
2017–2019	→ Eintracht Frankfurt (loan)	49	(25)
2019	Eintracht Frankfurt	5	(0)
2019–2022	Real Madrid	36	(3)
2021	→ Eintracht Frankfurt (loan)	18	(4)
2022–2023	Fiorentina	31	(6)
2023–2025	AC Milan	38	(8)
2025–	AEK Athens	39	(22)

International career^{‡}
2013–2014	Serbia U17	8	(5)
2014–2016	Serbia U19	13	(9)
2015–2019	Serbia U21	13	(7)
2018–	Serbia	57	(12)
- * Club domestic league appearances and goals as of 21 November 2026 ‡ National team caps and goals as of 16 November 2026

Luka Jović (Serbian Cyrillic: Лука Јовић; born 23 December 1997) is a Serbian professional footballer who plays as a striker for Super League Greece club AEK Athens and the Serbia national team.

Jović began his youth career at Red Star Belgrade before making his senior debut in May 2014. He then had stints at Benfica, Eintracht Frankfurt, Real Madrid, Fiorentina, and AC Milan, before signing for AEK Athens permanently in 2025.

Internationally, Jović has represented Serbia since 2018, earning over 45 caps and scoring 11 goals, and has played in major tournaments including the 2018 and 2022 FIFA World Cups and UEFA Euro 2024.

== Early life ==
Jović was born in Loznica, FR Yugoslavia. He was raised in the small village of Batar near Bijeljina, Republika Srpska, to Serbian parents Milan and Svetlana Jović. At the age of five, he started playing football in Loznica, where he was spotted in 2004 and offered to play in Mini Maxi, a development league for kids aged between 4 and 12 in Belgrade. After just one game where Jović scored three goals, his father was offered €50 for each game he played and 2,000 dinars for travelling costs from Batar to Belgrade. At one of those games he was scouted by Toma Milićević, Red Star's scout who invited him to trial with Red Star Belgrade. His playing style attracted comparisons to Darko Pančev and Radamel Falcao, who is also his idol.

== Club career ==
=== Red Star Belgrade ===
==== Youth ====
Jović was offered the chance to play for Red Star Belgrade in 2005. He played for the Zvezda youth team.

==== 2013–14 season ====
On 28 May 2014, at the age of 16 years, five months and five days, Jović made his professional debut against FK Vojvodina in Novi Sad, where he broke Dejan Stanković's record as the youngest goalscorer in a competitive match in the club's history. He scored the goal only two minutes after he was brought on as substitute, and the final score of 3–3 was enough to give Red Star the 2013–14 Serbian SuperLiga title.

==== 2014–15 season ====
On 18 October 2014, Jović became the youngest player ever to play in Eternal derby at the age of 16 years, 9 months and 25 days, breaking the previous record of Dejan Milovanović, who was 17 years and 6 months old at the time. Jović missed some crucial chances, but in spring half of the season scored six goals. His first goal of the season came against Vojvodina, in a match where Red Star celebrated its 70th birthday. He then scored against Spartak, a double against Borac and a decisive goal against Voždovac, ahead of the Eternal derby clash. He missed the end of the season and the 2015 FIFA U-20 World Cup in New Zealand due to injury. On 17 May 2015, he signed a three-year contract with Red Star to last until 2018.

==== 2015–16 season ====
From the beginning of the 2015–16 season, Jović started as a first choice in Red Star attack along with Hugo Vieira and scored 3 goals in the first 5 games. He scored again against Voždovac, a winning goal and brought another win to Red Star at Stadion na Vračaru. He scored another game-winner in Subotica, against Spartak. In November 2015, a racketeer from Loznica threatened him and his family that if they did not pay money to him, he would "break Jović's legs". A suspect was apprehended immediately afterwards.

=== Benfica ===
In February 2016, Jović signed with Portuguese champions Benfica until 2021. On 9 March, he debuted for the club's reserve team in a 2–2 home draw against Sporting da Covilhã in the Segunda Liga. He debuted for the first team on 20 March, as a substitute, in a 1–0 away victory against Boavista in the Primeira Liga.

On 30 January 2017, Jović made his only appearance for the first team when he came on as a substitute in the 81st minute against Vitória de Setúbal.

==== 2017–18 season ====
In June 2017, Jović joined Eintracht Frankfurt on a two-season loan while his new club secured an option to sign him on a permanent basis. He made five appearances as they won the 2017–18 DFB-Pokal, and scored the only goal of the win at Schalke 04 in the semi-finals on 18 April 2018, but was an unused substitute in the 3–1 final win over Bayern Munich.

==== 2018–19 season ====
20-year-old Jović became the youngest player to score five goals in a Bundesliga game when he did so in a 7–1 home win over Fortuna Düsseldorf on 19 October 2018. On 14 March 2019, he scored the only goal, his seventh for the campaign, in a 1–0 win over Inter Milan to secure the club's progression to the quarter finals of the Europa League. In doing so, he helped Eintracht become the first German club ever to record eight wins in a single season in the competition.

On 17 April 2019, Eintracht Frankfurt exercised a clause in Jović's contract to make his loan move permanent until 30 June 2023. In May 2019, he scored in both semi-final legs against Chelsea, yet Eintracht Frankfurt lost 4–3 on penalties after drawing 1–1 in both matches. However, Jović managed to score ten goals in total in the Europa League season.

=== Real Madrid ===
==== 2019–20 season ====
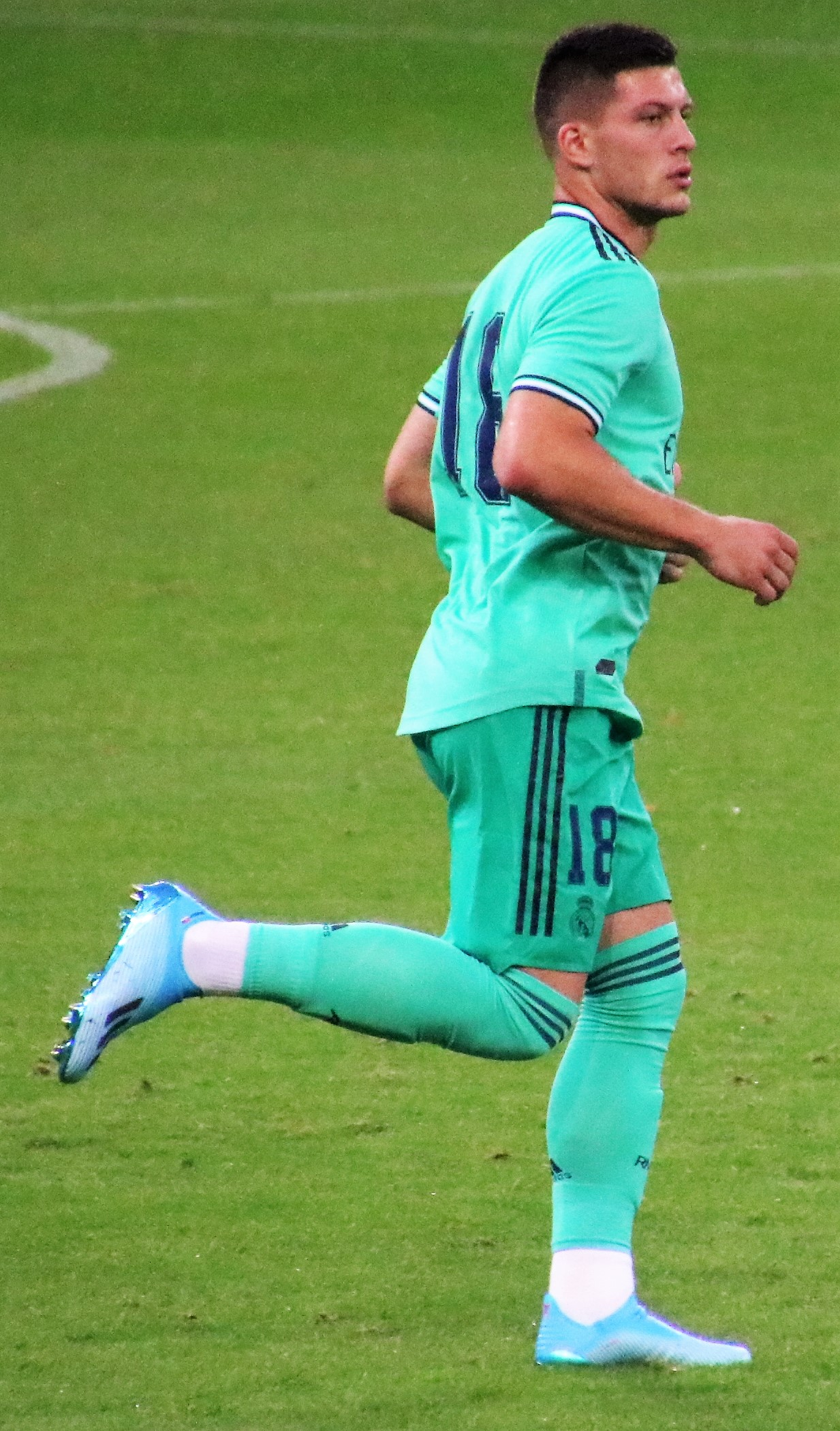
Jović playing for Real Madrid in 2019

On 4 June 2019, Jović signed for Real Madrid for a reported €60 million, on a six-year contract. He made his debut on 17 August 2019, coming in as a substitute in a 3–1 win over Celta Vigo. On 30 October 2019, he scored his first goal for the club in a 5–0 victory over CD Leganés.

Jović started both the semi-final and final match of 2019–20 Supercopa de España against Valencia (made an assist to Modrić's goal) and Atlético Madrid, respectively. Real won the final 4–1 on penalties on 12 January 2020, earning Jović his first trophy as a Real Madrid player. During an injury-riddled season, he made 17 appearances during the league season, while scoring two goals, as Real Madrid won the 2019–20 La Liga title.

==== Loan to Eintracht Frankfurt ====
On 14 January 2021, Jović was loaned back to his former club Eintracht Frankfurt until the end of the 2020–21 season. On 17 January, in his first match back with his former club, Jović came off the bench and scored two goals within half an hour as Frankfurt defeated Schalke 3–1.

=== Fiorentina ===
On 8 July 2022, Serie A club Fiorentina announced the signing of Jović on a free transfer. In his first and only season in Florence, he scored 13 goals in 50 games.

=== AC Milan ===
On 1 September 2023, Jović signed for fellow Serie A side AC Milan on a one-year contract. Three months later, on 2 December, Jović scored his first goal for Milan in a 3–1 home win against Frosinone.

He was omitted from Milan's 2024–25 Champions League squad, leaving his future with the club in doubt. On 29 June 2025, Milan confirmed that Jović was leaving the club upon the expiry of his contract.

=== AEK Athens ===
On 5 August 2025, Jović joined Greek club AEK Athens on a free transfer, signing a two-year deal. He scored on his debut against Aris Limassol, which helped secure qualification to the league phase of the UEFA Conference League. On 5 October, he came off the bench to score his first league goal in a 3–2 comeback win against Kifisia. A month later, on 30 November, he scored his first hat trick for AEK in their 3–2 away win in the Athenian derby, against Panathinaikos.

On 18 January 2026, he became the first player in the History of Greek football to score 4 goals against Panathinaikos in a derby in AEK's 4–0 triumph over their local rivals. (The jersey he wore in that match is now in the AEK Museum.) After some important goals, double against Atromitos, Levadiakos and decisive like a winner against OFI and vs Asteras Tripolis, he scored a crucial five minute brace again vs Atromitos in a 2–2 draw and was named Player of the Month for March.

Jović also led AEK to the third place in UEFA Conference League phase and their first European quarterfinal in the 21st century, as they progressed past Celje to reach the Quarterfinals of the UEFA Conference League 2025–26.

On 10 May 2026, Jović set up Zini for the equaliser in the 72nd minute, and in stoppage time, produced an assist for João Mário's 93rd-minute title-winning goal against Panathinaikos.

== International career ==
=== Youth ===
==== 2013–14: Hat-trick and 2014 European U19 Championship ====
On 11 December 2013, Jović scored a hat-trick for Serbia U-17 in a 4–1 win against Croatia U-17. In July 2014, he was called up by youth coach Veljko Paunović to Serbia's U-19 squad for the 2014 UEFA European Under-19 Championship.

=== Senior ===
==== 2018–19: Debut, first FIFA World Cup, and first goal ====
In May 2018, Jović was named in Serbia's preliminary squad for the FIFA World Cup in Russia. On 4 June, he made his international debut in a friendly match against Chile, coming on as a substitute for Aleksandar Mitrović in the 84th minute.

Later in June, Jović was included in the final 23-man squad for the 2018 FIFA World Cup, where he appeared as a late substitute against Brazil.

On 20 March 2019, Jović scored his debut goal for the national team in a friendly against Germany.

==== 2022–24: Second FIFA World Cup and first Euro ====
In November 2022 he was selected in Serbia's squad for the 2022 FIFA World Cup in Qatar. He played in group stage matches against Cameroon and Switzerland. Serbia finished fourth in the group.

Jović was part of the Serbia squad for UEFA Euro 2024. In the team's opening match of the tournament against England, he came on as a substitute for Saša Lukić in the 61st minute of the 1–0 loss. Jović appeared in the second match against Slovenia, where he scored a last-minute goal that tied the result at 1–1. He also appeared in the third match, against Denmark. Serbia finished fourth in the group.

== Personal life ==
When Jović was 10 years old, his older sister survived leukemia. He stated that period had "left a mark on their lives" and had motivated him to become a "fighter like her".

On 25 February 2019, Jović became a father of a baby boy, David, with his former girlfriend Anđela Manitašević, with whom he had split up in 2016. As of summer 2019, he is in a relationship with Serbian model Sofija Milošević. They have two children: Aleksej Jović (born 2020) and Teodor Jović (born 2022).

== Career statistics ==
=== Club ===
As of match played 21 November 2026

Appearances and goals by club, season and competition
Club	Season	League			National cup (Note: Includes Serbian Cup, Taça de Portugal, DFB-Pokal, Copa del Rey, Coppa Italia, Greek Cup)		League cup (Note: Includes Taça da Liga)		Europe		Other		Total	
Club	Season	Division	Apps	Goals	Apps	Goals	Apps	Goals	Apps	Goals	Apps	Goals	Apps	Goals
Red Star Belgrade	2013–14	Serbian SuperLiga	1	1	0	0	—		0	0	—		1	1
Red Star Belgrade	2014–15	Serbian SuperLiga	22	6	2	0	—		0	0	—		24	6
Red Star Belgrade	2015–16	Serbian SuperLiga	19	5	2	1	—		2 (Note: Appearances in UEFA Europa League)	0	—		23	6
Red Star Belgrade	Total		42	12	4	1	—		2	0	—		48	13
Benfica B	2015–16	LigaPro	7	2	—		—		—		—		7	2
Benfica B	2016–17	LigaPro	11	2	—		—		—		—		11	2
Benfica B	Total		18	4	—		—		—		—		18	4
Benfica	2015–16	Primeira Liga	1	0	0	0	0	0	1 (Note: Appearance(s) in UEFA Champions League)	0	0	0	2	0
Benfica	2016–17	Primeira Liga	1	0	0	0	1	0	0	0	0	0	2	0
Benfica	Total		2	0	0	0	1	0	1	0	0	0	4	0
Eintracht Frankfurt	2017–18	Bundesliga	22	8	5	1	—		—		—		27	9
Eintracht Frankfurt	2018–19	Bundesliga	32	17	1	0	—		14	10	1 (Note: Appearance in DFL-Supercup)	0	48	27
Eintracht Frankfurt	Total		54	25	6	1	—		14	10	1	0	75	36
Real Madrid	2019–20	La Liga	17	2	3	0	—		5	0	2 (Note: Appearances in Supercopa de España)	0	27	2
Real Madrid	2020–21	La Liga	4	0	0	0	—		1	0	0	0	5	0
Real Madrid	2021–22	La Liga	15	1	1	0	—		3	0	0	0	19	1
Real Madrid	Total		36	3	4	0	—		9	0	2	0	51	3
Eintracht Frankfurt (loan)	2020–21	Bundesliga	18	4	—		—		—		—		18	4
Fiorentina	2022–23	Serie A	31	6	4	1	—		15 (Note: Appearances in UEFA Europa Conference League)	6	—		50	13
AC Milan	2023–24	Serie A	23	6	2	2	—		5 (Note: Two appearances in UEFA Champions League, three appearances and one goal in UEFA Europa League)	1	—		30	9
AC Milan	2024–25	Serie A	15	2	2	2	—		0	0	—		17	4
AC Milan	Total		38	8	4	4	—		5	1	—		47	13
AEK Athens	2025–26	Super League Greece	29	17	3	0	—		11 (Note: Appearances in UEFA Conference League)	4	—		43	21
AEK Athens	2026–27	Super League Greece	10	5	1	1	—		6	1	1 (Note: Appearance in Greek Super Cup)	1	18	8
AEK Athens	Total		39	22	4	1	—		17	5	1	1	61	29
Career total			278	84	26	8	1	0	63	22	4	1	372	115

=== International ===
As of match played 16 November 2026

Appearances and goals by national team and year
National team	Year	Apps	Goals
Serbia	2018	3	0
Serbia	2019	4	2
Serbia	2020	4	3
Serbia	2021	9	2
Serbia	2022	10	3
Serbia	2023	1	0
Serbia	2024	11	1
Serbia	2025	8	0
Serbia	2026	7	1
Total		57	12

Serbia score listed first, score column indicates score after each Jović goal.

List of international goals scored by Luka Jović
No.	Date	Venue	Opponent	Score	Result	Competition
1	20 March 2019	Volkswagen Arena, Wolfsburg, Germany	Germany	1–0	1–1	Friendly
2	10 June 2019	Rajko Mitić Stadium, Belgrade, Serbia	Lithuania	3–0	4–1	UEFA Euro 2020 qualifying
3	12 November 2020	Rajko Mitić Stadium, Belgrade, Serbia	Scotland	1–1	1–1 (a.e.t.) (4–5 p)	UEFA Euro 2020 qualifying
4	18 November 2020	Rajko Mitić Stadium, Belgrade, Serbia	Russia	2–0	5–0	2020–21 UEFA Nations League B
5	18 November 2020	Rajko Mitić Stadium, Belgrade, Serbia	Russia	4–0	5–0	2020–21 UEFA Nations League B
6	1 September 2021	Nagyerdei Stadion, Debrecen, Hungary	Qatar	2–0	4–0	Friendly
7	11 November 2021	Rajko Mitić Stadium, Belgrade, Serbia	Qatar	2–0	4–0	Friendly
8	5 June 2022	Rajko Mitić Stadium, Belgrade, Serbia	Slovenia	3–1	4–1	2022–23 UEFA Nations League B
9	9 June 2022	Friends Arena, Solna, Sweden	Sweden	1–0	1–0	2022–23 UEFA Nations League B
10	18 November 2022	Al Muharraq Stadium, Arad, Bahrain	Bahrain	5–1	5–1	Friendly
11	20 June 2024	Allianz Arena, Munich, Germany	Slovenia	1–1	1–1	UEFA Euro 2024
12	27 September 2026	Rajko Mitić Stadium, Belgrade, Serbia	Netherlands	1–1	1–2	2026–27 UEFA Nations League A

== Honours ==
Red Star Belgrade

- Serbian SuperLiga: 2013–14

Benfica

- Primeira Liga: 2015–16, 2016–17

Eintracht Frankfurt

- DFB-Pokal: 2017–18

Real Madrid

- La Liga: 2019–20, 2021–22
- Supercopa de España: 2020, 2022
- UEFA Champions League: 2021–22

AC Milan

- Supercoppa Italiana: 2024–25

AEK Athens

- Super League Greece: 2025–26

Individual

- UEFA Europa League Squad of the Season: 2018–19
- Bundesliga Team of the Season: 2018–19
- Bundesliga Best Striker – Elected by Union of the Bundesliga players: 2018–19
- Eintracht Frankfurt All-Time Best XI
- Supercopa de España Top Assist Provider: 2020
- AC Milan MVP of the Month: December 2023, April 2025
- Super League Greece Best Striker of the Season: 2025–26 by Transfermarkt
- Super League Greece Player of the Month: March 2026, September 2026
- Super League Greece Team of the Season: 2025–26
