= Serbia national football team results =

This is a list of football matches and competitions currently involving the Serbia national football team. For results of more specific decades see the lists below.

== Friendlies ==
18 August 2006 Friendly	Czech Republic	1–3	Serbia	Uherské Hradiště, Czech Republic
	Štajner 3'	Report	Lazović 41'; Pantelić 54'; Trišović 71'	Stadium: Městský fotbalový stadion Miroslava Valenty; Attendance: 8,047; Referee: Dietmar Drabek (Austria)

15 November 2006 Friendly	Serbia	1–1	Norway	Belgrade, Serbia
20:15	Vidić 6'	Report	Carew 22'	Stadium: Stadion Crvena Zvezda; Attendance: 12,000; Referee: Giorgos Kasnaferis (Greece)

27 December 2006 Friendly unofficial match	Basque Country	4–0	Serbia	Bilbao, Spain
20:30 CET	Yeste 33'; Urzaiz 41'; Sarriegui 60'; Uranga 87'	Report		Stadium: San Mamés; Referee: Carlos Delgado Ferreiro

6 February 2008 Friendly	Macedonia	1–1	Serbia	Skopje, Macedonia
17:00	Noveski 58'	Report	Lazović 43'	Stadium: Gradski stadion Attendance: 10,000; Referee: Tsvetan Georgiev (Bulgaria)

26 March 2008 Friendly	Ukraine	2–0	Serbia	Odesa, Ukraine
18:00	Shevchenko 54'; Nazarenko 57'	Report		Stadium: Chernomorets Stadium; Attendance: 8,000; Referee: Romāns Lajuks (Latvia)

24 May 2008 Friendly	Republic of Ireland	1–1	Serbia	Dublin, Republic of Ireland
20:45	Keogh 90+1'	Report	Pantelić 75'	Stadium: Croke Park; Attendance: 42,500; Referee: Simon Lee Evans (Wales)

28 May 2008 Friendly	Russia	2–1	Serbia	Burghausen, Germany
19:00	Pogrebnyak 18'; Pavlyuchenko 48'	Report	Pantelić 40'	Stadium: Wacker-Arena; Attendance: 4,030; Referee: Wolfgang Stark (Germany)

31 May 2008 Friendly	Germany	2–1	Serbia	Gelsenkirchen, Germany
17:30	Neuville 74'; Ballack 82'	Report	Janković 18'	Stadium: Veltins-Arena; Attendance: 53,951; Referee: Fredy Fautrel (France)

19 November 2008 Friendly	Serbia	6–1	Bulgaria	Belgrade, Serbia
17:35	Jovanović 9', 26'; Milošević 28', 34'; Milijaš 57'; Lazović 67'	Report	Georgiev 20'	Stadium: Partizan Stadium; Attendance: 7,000; Referee: Peter Sippel (Germany)

14 December 2008 Friendly	Poland	1–0	Serbia	Antalya, Turkey
15:00	Boguski 53'	Report		Stadium: Mardan Sports Complex; Attendance: 100; Referee: Selçuk Dereli (Turkey)

10 February 2009 Friendly	Cyprus	0–2	Serbia	Nicosia, Cyprus
18:00		Report	Jovanović 25'; Lazović 42'	Stadium: GSP Stadium; Attendance: 250; Referee: Anastassios Kakos (Greece)

11 February 2009 Friendly	Ukraine	1–0	Serbia	Nicosia, Cyprus
18:00	Nazarenko 16'	Report		Stadium: GSP Stadium; Attendance: 200; Referee: Leontios Trattou (Cyprus)

1 April 2009 Friendly	Serbia	2–0	Sweden	Belgrade, Serbia
21:00	Žigić 1'; Janković 82'	Report		Stadium: Partizan Stadium; Attendance: 17,890; Referee: Antonio Rubinos Pérez (Spain)

12 August 2009 Friendly	South Africa	1–3	Serbia	Pretoria, South Africa
19:00	Mphela 90'	Report	Tošić 56', 77'; Lazović 68'	Stadium: Super Stadium; Attendance: 10,000; Referee: Eddy Maillet (Seychelles)

14 November 2009 Friendly	Northern Ireland	0–1	Serbia	Belfast, Northern Ireland
18:30		Report	Lazović 57'	Stadium: Windsor Park; Attendance: 13,500; Referee: Anastassios Kakos (Luxembourg)

18 November 2009 Friendly	South Korea	0–1	Serbia	London, England
15:30		Report	Žigić 7'	Stadium: Craven Cottage; Attendance: 8,000; Referee: Stuart Attwell (England)

3 March 2010 Friendly	Algeria	0–3	Serbia	Algiers, Algeria
19:15		Report	Pantelić 16'; Kuzmanović 55'; Tošić 65'	Stadium: July 5, 1962 Stadium; Attendance: 65,000; Referee: Badara Diatta (Senegal)

7 April 2010 Friendly	Japan	0–3	Serbia	Osaka, Japan
12:15		Report	Mrđa 15', 23'; Tomić 60'	Stadium: Yanmar Stadium Nagai; Attendance: 46,270; Referee: Choi Myung-yong (South Korea)

29 May 2010 Friendly	New Zealand	1–0	Serbia	Klagenfurt, Austria
17:15	Smeltz 22'	Report		Stadium: Wörthersee Stadion; Attendance: 14,000; Referee: Selçuk Dereli (Austria)

2 June 2010 Friendly	Poland	0–0	Serbia	Kufstein, Austria
20:30		Report		Stadium: Kufstein Arena; Attendance: 2,500; Referee: Dietmar Drabek (Austria)

5 June 2010 Friendly	Serbia	4–3	Cameroon	Belgrade, Serbia
16:00	Krasić 16'; Stanković 25'; Milijaš 44' (pen.); Pantelić 45'	Report	Webó 5', 20'; Choupo-Moting 67'	Stadium: Partizan Stadium; Attendance: 20,000; Referee: Leontios Trattos (Cyprus)

11 August 2010 Friendly	Serbia	0–1	Greece	Belgrade, Serbia
20:30		Report	Salpingidis 45'	Stadium: Partizan Stadium; Attendance: 10,000; Referee: Fernando Teixeira Vitienes (Spain)

17 November 2010 Friendly	Bulgaria	0–1	Serbia	Sofia, Bulgaria
18:00		Report	Žigić 80'	Stadium: Vasil Levski National Stadium; Attendance: 1,500; Referee: Marius Avram (Romania)

9 February 2011 Friendly	Israel	0–2	Serbia	Tel Aviv, Israel
19:00		Report	Tošić 22'; Trivunović 77'	Stadium: Bloomfield Stadium; Attendance: 6,000; Referee: Alexey Nikolaev (Russia)

3 June 2011 Friendly	South Korea	2–1	Serbia	Seoul, South Korea
13:00	Park Chu-young 10'; Kim Young-kwon 53'	Report	Petrović 85'	Stadium: Seoul World Cup Stadium; Attendance: 40,000; Referee: Ali Albadwawi (United Arab Emirates)

7 June 2011 Friendly	Australia	0–0	Serbia	Melbourne, Australia
13:30		Report		Stadium: Docklands Stadium; Attendance: 28,150; Referee: Minoru Tojo (Japan)

10 August 2011 Friendly	Russia	1–0	Serbia	Moscow, Russia
17:00	Pogrebnyak 53'	Report		Stadium: Luzhniki Stadium; Attendance: 27,000; Referee: Eduard Dumitrescu (Romania)

11 November 2011 Friendly	Mexico	2–0	Serbia	Querétaro, Mexico
20:00 UTC-6	Salcido 2'; Hernández 88' (pen.)	Report		Stadium: Estadio Corregidora; Attendance: 30,000; Referee: Walter Lopez (Guatemala)

15 November 2011 Friendly	Honduras	2–0	Serbia	San Pedro Sula, Honduras
19:30 UTC-6	Bengtson 6', 30'	Report		Stadium: Estadio Olímpico Metropolitano; Attendance: 20,000; Referee: Walter Quesada Cordero (Costa Rica)

28 February 2012 Friendly	Armenia	0–2	Serbia	Limassol, Cyprus
15:00		Report	Kuzmanović 15'; Ivanović 30'	Stadium: Tsirion Stadium; Attendance: 0 Referee: Leontios Trattos (Cyprus)

29 February 2012 Friendly	Cyprus	0–0	Serbia	Limassol, Cyprus
15:00		Report		Stadium: Tsirion Stadium; Attendance: 300; Referee: Kevin Blom (Netherland)

26 May 2012 Friendly	Spain	2–0	Serbia	St. Gallen, Switzerland
18:00	Adrián 64'; Cazorla 74'	Report		Stadium: AFG Arena; Attendance: 15,625; Referee: Cyril Zimmermann (Switzerland)

31 May 2012 Friendly	France	2–0	Serbia	Reims, France
21:00	Ribéry 11'; Malouda 15'	Report		Stadium: Stade Auguste Delaune; Attendance: 19,000; Referee: Knut Kircher (Germany)

5 June 2012 Friendly	Sweden	2–1	Serbia	Stockholm, Sweden
19:00	Toivonen 23'; Ibrahimović 52' (pen.)	Report	Subotić 27'	Stadium: Råsundastadion; Attendance: 20,691; Referee: Felix Brych (Germany)

15 August 2012 Friendly	Serbia	0–0	Republic of Ireland	Belgrade, Serbia
20:45		Report		Stadium: Stadion Crvena Zvezda; Attendance: 7,800; Referee: Alexandru Tudor (Romania)

14 November 2012 Friendly	Chile	1–3	Serbia	St. Gallen, Switzerland
20:00	Henríquez 88'	Report	Marković 22'; Đorđević 47'; Đuričić 59'	Stadium: AFG Arena; Attendance: 2,116; Referee: Sascha Kever (Switzerland)

6 February 2013 Friendly	Cyprus	1–3	Serbia	Nicosia, Cyprus
17:00	Makrides 19'	Report	Tadić 23', 47'; Basta 70'	Stadium: GSP Stadium; Attendance: 1,000; Referee: Athanasios Giachos (Greece)

14 August 2013 Friendly	Colombia	1–0	Serbia	Barcelona, Spain
20:00	Guarín 89'	Report		Stadium: Mini Estadi; Attendance: 5,000; Referee: Javier Estrada Fernández (Spain)

11 October 2013 Friendly	Serbia	2–0	Japan	Novi Sad, Serbia
17:30	Tadić 59'; Jojić 90'	Report		Stadium: Stadion Karađorđe; Attendance: 10,000; Referee: Fırat Aydınus (Turkey)

15 November 2013 Friendly	Serbia	1–1	Russia	Dubai, United Arab Emirates
17:30	Đorđević 31'	Report	Samedov 29'	Stadium: Zabeel Stadium; Attendance: 3,000; Referee: Rashid Al Zarouni (UAE)

5 March 2014 Friendly	Republic of Ireland	1–2	Serbia	Dublin, Republic of Ireland
20:45	Long 8'		McCarthy 48' (o.g.); Đorđević 60'	Stadium: Aviva Stadium; Attendance: 37,243; Referee: Viktor Kassai (Hungary)

26 May 2014 Friendly	Serbia	2–1	Jamaica	Harrison, New Jersey, United States
16:00 UTC-4	Tadić 13'; Kolarov 22'		Seaton 53'	Stadium: Red Bull Arena; Attendance: 2,000; Referee: Dave Gantar (Canada)

31 May 2014 Friendly	Serbia	1–1	Panama	Bridgeview, Illinois, United States
19:00 UTC-5	Ivanović 25'	Report	Gómez 60'	Stadium: Toyota Park; Attendance: 3,000; Referee: Marlon Mejia (El Salvador)

6 June 2014 Friendly	Brazil	1–0	Serbia	São Paulo, Brazil
16:00 UTC-3	Fred 58'	Report		Stadium: Morumbi Stadium; Attendance: 67,042; Referee: Enrique Cáceres (Paraguay)

7 September 2014 Friendly	Serbia	1–1	France	Belgrade, Serbia
20:45 UTC+2	Kolarov 80'	Report	Pogba 13'	Stadium: Partizan Stadium; Attendance: 12,000; Referee: Wolfgang Stark (Germany)

18 November 2014 Friendly	Greece	0–2	Serbia	Chania, Greece
18:00		Report	Petrović 60'; Gudelj 90'	Stadium: Perivolia Municipal Stadium; Attendance: 3,700; Referee: Neil Doyle (Ireland)

7 June 2015 Friendly	Serbia	4–1	Azerbaijan	Sankt Pölten, Austria
17:00 UTC+2	Ivanović 10', 63'; Ljajić 55'; Marković 89'	Report	Nazarov 39'	Stadium: NV Arena; Attendance: 2,500; Referee: Harald Lechner (Austria)

7 September 2015 Friendly	France	2–1	Serbia	Bordeaux, France
20:45 UTC+2	Matuidi 9', 25'	Report	Mitrović 39'	Stadium: Stade Bordeaux-Atlantique; Attendance: 40,000; Referee: Artur Dias Soares (Portugal)

13 November 2015 Friendly	Czech Republic	4–1	Serbia	Vítkovice, Czech Republic
20:30 GMT +2	Sivok 17'; Necid 63' (pen.); Krejčí 82'; Zahustel 90+3'	Report	Škuletić 78'	Stadium: Městský stadion Attendance: 14,975; Referee: Vladimir Vnuk (Slovakia)

23 March 2016 Friendly	Poland	1–0	Serbia	Poznań, Poland
20:45 UTC+1	Błaszczykowski 28'	Report		Stadium: INEA Stadion; Attendance: 38,271; Referee: Alexander Harkam (Austria)

29 March 2016 Friendly	Estonia	0–1	Serbia	Tallinn, Estonia
18:00 UTC+1		Report	Kolarov 81'	Stadium: Lilleküla Stadium; Attendance: 2,858; Referee: Arnold Hunter (Northern Ireland)

25 May 2016 Friendly	Serbia	2–1	Cyprus	Užice, Serbia
17:00 UTC+2	Mitrović 2'; Tadić 10'	Report	Ni. Maksimović 32' (o.g.)	Stadium: Užice City Stadium; Attendance: 7,000; Referee: Pavle Radovanović (Montenegro)

31 May 2016 Friendly	Serbia	3–1	Israel	Novi Sad, Serbia
20:10 UTC+2	Ivanović 33'; Milunović 74'; Tadić 88'	Report	Zahavi 49' (pen.)	Stadium: Stadion Karađorđe; Attendance: 10,000; Referee: Sebastian Colțescu (Romania)

5 June 2016 Friendly	Russia	1–1	Serbia	Fontvieille, Monaco
18:00 UTC+2	Dzyuba 85'	Report	Mitrović 88'	Stadium: Stade Louis II; Attendance: 2,000; Referee: Ruddy Buquet (France)

29 September 2016 Friendly	Qatar	3–0	Serbia	Doha, Qatar
21:00 UTC+3	Soria 24', 30', 43'	Report		Stadium: Jassim bin Hamad Stadium; Attendance: 0 Referee: Adrien Jaccottet (Switzerland)

15 November 2016 Friendly	Ukraine	2–0	Serbia	Kharkiv, Ukraine
21:00 UTC+1	Shakhov 38'; Yarmolenko 87' (pen.)	Report		Stadium: Metalist Stadium; Attendance: 30,000; Referee: Martin Strömbergsson (Sweden)

29 January 2017 Friendly	United States	0–0	Serbia	San Diego, United States
22:30 UTC+1		Report		Stadium: Qualcomm Stadium; Attendance: 20,079; Referee: Kevin Morrison (Jamaica)

10 November 2017 Friendly	China	0–2	Serbia	Guangzhou, China
12:35 (19:35 UTC+8)			Ljajić 20'; Mitrović 69'	Stadium: Tianhe Stadium; Attendance: 17,160; Referee: Hettikamkanamge Perera (Sri Lanka)

14 November 2017 Friendly	South Korea	1–1	Serbia	Ulsan, South Korea
12:00 (21:00 UTC+9)	Koo 63' (pen.)	Report	Ljajić 59'	Stadium: Ulsan Munsu Football Stadium; Attendance: 30,560; Referee: Ma Ning (China)

23 March 2018 Friendly	Serbia	1–2	Morocco	Turin, Italy
20:30 (20:30 UTC+2)	Tadić 37'	Report	Ziyech 29' (pen.); Boutaïb 40'	Stadium: Stadio Olimpico Grande Torino; Attendance: 15,700; Referee: Marco Guida (Italy)

27 March 2018 Friendly	Nigeria	0–2	Serbia	London, England
21:00 (20:00 UTC)		Report	A. Mitrović 68', 81'	Stadium: The Hive Stadium; Attendance: 3,500; Referee: Craig Pawson (England)

4 June 2018 Friendly	Serbia	0–1	Chile	Graz, Austria
20:00 (19:00 UTC)		Report	Maripán 88'	Stadium: Liebenauer Stadium; Attendance: 2,000; Referee: Alexander Harkam (Austria)

9 June 2018 Friendly	Serbia	5–1	Bolivia	Graz, Austria
18:00 (18:00 UTC)	A. Mitrović 4', 23', 68'; Ljajić 19'; Ivanović 42'	Report	Campos 48'	Stadium: Liebenauer Stadium; Attendance: 1,572; Referee: Christopher Jäger (Austria)

20 March 2019 Friendly	Germany	1–1	Serbia	Wolfsburg, Germany
20:45	Goretzka 69'	Report	Jović 12'	Stadium: Volkswagen Arena; Attendance: 26,101; Referee: Bobby Madden (Scotland)

10 October 2019 Friendly	Serbia	1–0	Paraguay	Kruševac, Serbia
20:45	Mitrović 90'	Report		Stadium: Mladost Stadium; Attendance: 5,000; Referee: Nejc Kajtazovic (Slovenia)

25 January 2021 Friendly	Dominican Republic	0–0	Serbia	Santo Domingo, Dominican Republic
22:00		Report		Stadium: Estadio Olímpico Félix Sánchez; Attendance: 0 Referee: William Anderson (Puerto Rico)

28 January 2021 Friendly	Panama	0–0	Serbia	Panama City, Panama
01:00		Report		Stadium: Estadio Rommel Fernández; Attendance: 0 Referee: Ameth Ariel Sánchez Pinzón (Panama)

7 June 2021 Friendly	Serbia	1–1	Jamaica	Miki, Japan
09:00	Pavlović 61'	Report	Gray 29'	Stadium: Miki Athletic Stadium; Attendance: 0 Referee: Yudai Yamamoto (Japan)

11 June 2021 2021 Kirin Challenge Cup	Japan	1–0	Serbia	Kobe, Japan
12:25	Ito 48'	Report		Stadium: Noevir Stadium Kobe; Attendance: 0 Referee: Ahmed Eisa Darwish (United Arab Emirates)

1 September 2021 Friendly	Qatar	0–4	Serbia	Debrecen, Hungary
20:45		Report	Khoukhi 2' (o.g.); Jović 17'; Vlahović 60'; Milenković 84'	Stadium: Nagyerdei Stadion; Attendance: 0 Referee: Filip Glova (Slovakia)

11 November 2021 Friendly	Serbia	4–0	Qatar	Belgrade, Serbia
18:00	Lukić 45+2'; Jović 51'; Vlahović 53'; Milinković-Savić 83'	Report		Stadium: Stadion Rajko Mitić; Attendance: 1,000; Referee: Irfan Peljto (Bosnia and Herzegovina)

24 March 2022 Friendly	Hungary	0–1	Serbia	Budapest, Hungary
19:30		Report	Nagy 35' (o.g.)	Stadium: Puskás Aréna; Attendance: 30,000; Referee: Filip Glova (Slovakia)

29 March 2022 Friendly	Denmark	3–0	Serbia	Copenhagen, Denmark
18:00	Mæhle 15'; Lindstrøm 53'; Eriksen 57'	Report		Stadium: Parken Stadium; Attendance: 35,010; Referee: Felix Zwayer (Germany)

18 November 2022 Friendly	Bahrain	1–5	Serbia	Riffa, Bahrain
16:30	Yusuf Helal 15' (pen.)	Report	Tadić 8', 50'; Vlahović 51'; Đuričić 87'; Jović 89'	Stadium: Bahrain National Stadium; Attendance: 4,000; Referee: Khalid Alturais (Saudi Arabia)

26 January 2023 Friendly	United States	1–2	Serbia	Los Angeles, United States
04:00	Vazquez 29'	Report	Ilić 43'; Simić 46'	Stadium: BMO Stadium; Attendance: 11,475; Referee: Daneon Parchment (Jamaica)

16 June 2023 Friendly	Serbia	3–2	Jordan	Vienna, Austria
20:30	Eraković 7'; Joveljić 83', 88'	Report	Al-Mardi 54'; Al-Taamari 67'	Stadium: Franz Horr Stadium; Attendance: 8,854; Referee: Stefan Ebner (Austria)

15 November 2023 Friendly	Belgium	1–0	Serbia	Leuven, Belgium
20:45	Carrasco 2'	Report		Stadium: Den Dreef; Attendance: 0 Referee: Marian Alexandru Barbu (Romania)

21 March 2024 Friendly	Russia	4–0	Serbia	Moscow, Russia
18:00	An. Miranchuk 21' (pen.); Osipenko 32'; Al. Miranchuk 55'; Sergeev 90+1'	Report		Stadium: VTB Arena; Attendance: 23,679; Referee: Arda Kardeşler (Turkey)

25 March 2024 Friendly	Cyprus	0–1	Serbia	Larnaca, Cyprus
18:00		Report	Milinković-Savić 7'	Stadium: AEK Arena; Attendance: 1,938; Referee: Marco Di Bello (Italy)

4 June 2024 Friendly	Austria	2–1	Serbia	Vienna, Austria
20:45	Wimmer 10'; Baumgartner 13'	Report	Pavlović 35'	Stadium: Ernst Happel Stadion; Attendance: 37,800; Referee: António Nobre (Portugal)

8 June 2024 Friendly	Sweden	0–3	Serbia	Solna, Sweden
18:00		Report	S. Milinković-Savić 18'; Mitrović 60'; Tadić 70'	Stadium: Friends Arena; Attendance: 46,956; Referee: Jasper Vergoote (Belgium)

27 March 2026 Friendly	Spain	3–0	Serbia	Villarreal, Spain
21:00 UTC+2	Oyarzabal 16', 44'; Muñoz 72'	Report		Stadium: Estadio de la Ceramica; Attendance: 20,482; Referee: Luis Godinho (Portugal)

31 March 2026 Friendly	Serbia	2–1	Saudi Arabia	Bačka Topola, Serbia (Note: The match was originally scheduled to be played at the Jassim bin Hamad Stadium, Al Rayyan, but was relocated to Serbia due to the 2026 Iran war.)
18:00 UTC+2	Pavlović 66'; Mitrović 70'	Report	Al-Hamdan 8'	Stadium: TSC Arena; Attendance: 4,101; Referee: Balázs Berke (Hungary)

31 May 2026 Friendly	Cape Verde	3–0	Serbia	Lisbon, Portugal
17:00 UTC+2	Pina 11'; Duarte 59'; Benchimol 63'	Report (FIFA); Report (UEFA)		Stadium: Estádio do Restelo; Attendance: 7,500; Referee: João António Gonçalves (Portugal)

4 June 2026 Friendly	Mexico	5–1	Serbia	Toluca, Mexico
20:00 UTC−6	Johan Vásquez 34'; S. Bukinac 45+3' (o.g.); R. Jiménez 57'; A. Avdić 72' (o.g.); L. Chávez 90'	Report (FIFA); Report (UEFA)	P. Stanić 19'	Stadium: Estadio Nemesio Diez; Attendance: 27,163; Referee: Keylor Herrera (Costa Rica)

== UEFA Euro 2008 qualifying ==
Pos	Team	Pld	W	D	L	GF	GA	GD	Pts	Qualification
1	Poland	14	8	4	2	24	12	+12	28	Qualify for final tournament
2	Portugal	14	7	6	1	24	10	+14	27	Qualify for final tournament
3	Serbia	14	6	6	2	22	11	+11	24 (Note: Head-to-head points: Serbia 4, Finland 1.)	
4	Finland	14	6	6	2	13	7	+6	24	
5	Belgium	14	5	3	6	14	16	−2	18	
6	Kazakhstan	14	2	4	8	11	21	−10	10	
7	Armenia	12	2	3	7	4	13	−9	9	
8	Azerbaijan	12	1	2	9	6	28	−22	5	

Rules for classification: Qualification tiebreakers

=== Results ===
2 September 2006 UEFA Euro 2008 qualifying Group A	Serbia	1–0	Azerbaijan	Belgrade, Serbia
20:15	Žigić 72'	Report		Stadium: Stadion Crvena Zvezda; Attendance: 0 (Note: Serbia played their home match against Azerbaijan behind closed doors as they were punished for a previous crowd disturbance during their last match of 2006 FIFA World Cup qualification.); Referee: Knut Kircher (Germany)

6 September 2006 UEFA Euro 2008 qualifying Group A	Poland	1–1	Serbia	Warsaw, Poland
20:30	Matusiak 30'	Report	Lazović 71'	Stadium: Stadion Wojska Polskiego; Attendance: 5,000; Referee: Graham Poll (England)

7 October 2006 UEFA Euro 2008 qualifying Group A	Serbia	1–0	Belgium	Belgrade, Serbia
20:15	Žigić 54'	Report		Stadium: Stadion Crvena Zvezda; Attendance: 35,000; Referee: Domenico Messina (Italy)

11 October 2006 UEFA Euro 2008 qualifying Group A	Serbia	3–0	Armenia	Belgrade, Serbia
20:45 CEST (UTC+02:00)	Stanković 54' (pen.); Lazović 62'; Žigić 90'	Report		Stadium: Stadion Crvena Zvezda; Attendance: 20,000; Referee: Georgios Kasnaferis (Greece)

24 March 2007 UEFA Euro 2008 qualifying Group A	Kazakhstan	2–1	Serbia	Almaty, Kazakhstan
19:00	Ashirbekov 47'; Zhumaskaliyev 61'	Report	Žigić 68'	Stadium: Central Stadium; Attendance: 15,000; Referee: Vladimir Hriňák (Slovakia)

28 March 2007 UEFA Euro 2008 qualifying Group A	Serbia	1–1	Portugal	Belgrade, Serbia
20:15	Janković 37'	Report	Tiago 5'	Stadium: Stadion Crvena Zvezda; Attendance: 55,000; Referee: Bertrand Layec (France)

2 June 2007 UEFA Euro 2008 qualifying Group A	Finland	0–2	Serbia	Helsinki, Finland
19:15		Report	Janković 3'; Jovanović 86'	Stadium: Olympic Stadium; Attendance: 33,615; Referee: Manuel Mejuto González (Spain)

22 August 2007 UEFA Euro 2008 qualifying Group A	Belgium	3–2	Serbia	Brussels, Belgium
20:45	Dembélé 10', 88'; Mirallas 30'	Report	Kuzmanović 73', 90+1'	Stadium: King Baudouin Stadium; Attendance: 19,202; Referee: Terje Hauge (Norway)

8 September 2007 UEFA Euro 2008 qualifying Group A	Serbia	0–0	Finland	Belgrade, Serbia
20:15		Report		Stadium: Stadion Crvena Zvezda; Attendance: 15,000; Referee: Eric Braamhaar (Netherlands)

12 September 2007 UEFA Euro 2008 qualifying Group A	Portugal	1–1	Serbia	Lisbon, Portugal
21:00	Simão 11'	Report	Ivanović 88'	Stadium: Estádio José Alvalade; Attendance: 47,000; Referee: Markus Merk (Germany)

13 October 2007 UEFA Euro 2008 qualifying Group A	Armenia	0–0	Serbia	Yerevan, Armenia
20:00		Report		Stadium: Hanrapetakan Stadium; Attendance: 10,000; Referee: Stefan Johannesson (Sweden)

17 October 2007 UEFA Euro 2008 qualifying Group A	Azerbaijan	1–6	Serbia	Baku, Azerbaijan
21:00	Aliyev 26'	Report	D. Tošić 4'; Žigić 22', 42'; Janković 41'; Smiljanic 75'; Lazović 84'	Stadium: Tofik Bakhramov Stadium; Attendance: 9,000; Referee: Thomas Einwaller (Austria)

21 November 2007 UEFA Euro 2008 qualifying Group A	Serbia	2–2	Poland	Belgrade, Serbia
20:45	Žigić 68'; Lazović 70'	Report	Murawski 28'; Matusiak 46'	Stadium: Stadion Crvena Zvezda; Attendance: 3,000; Referee: Massimo Busacca (Switzerland)

24 November 2007 UEFA Euro 2008 qualifying Group A	Serbia	1–0	Kazakhstan	Belgrade, Serbia
20:45	Ostapenko 79' (o.g.)	Report		Stadium: Partizan Stadium; Attendance: 300; Referee: Kyros Vassaras (Greece)

=== Goalscorers during the qualification ===
7 goals

- Nikola Žigić

4 goals

- Danko Lazović

3 goals

- Boško Janković

2 goals

- Zdravko Kuzmanović

1 goal

- Branislav Ivanović
- Dejan Stanković
- Duško Tošić
- Milan Jovanović
- Milan Smiljanić
- Sergei Ostapenko (Own Goal)

=== Attendance ===
Highest	Lowest	Average
55,000 vs. Portugal	0 vs. Azerbaijan	18,329

== 2010 FIFA World Cup qualification ==
Pos	Team	Pld	W	D	L	GF	GA	GD	Pts	Qualification
1	Serbia	10	7	1	2	22	8	+14	22	Qualification to 2010 FIFA World Cup
2	France	10	6	3	1	18	9	+9	21	Advance to second round
3	Austria	10	4	2	4	14	15	−1	14	
4	Lithuania	10	4	0	6	10	11	−1	12	
5	Romania	10	3	3	4	12	18	−6	12	
6	Faroe Islands	10	1	1	8	5	20	−15	4	

=== Results ===
6 September 2008 2010 FIFA World Cup qualifying Group 7	Serbia	2–0	Faroe Islands	Belgrade, Serbia
20:15	Jacobsen 30' (o.g.); Žigić 88'	Report		Stadium: Stadion Crvena Zvezda; Attendance: 9,615; Referee: Aleksei Nikolaev (Russia)

10 September 2008 2010 FIFA World Cup qualifying Group 7	France	2–1	Serbia	Saint-Denis, France
21:00	Henry 53'; Anelka 63'	Report	Ivanović 75'	Stadium: Stade de France; Attendance: 53,027; Referee: Olegário Benquerença (Portugal)

11 October 2008 2010 FIFA World Cup qualifying Group 7	Serbia	3–0	Lithuania	Belgrade, Serbia
20:15	Ivanović 6'; Krasić 34'; Žigić 82'	Report		Stadium: Stadion Crvena Zvezda; Attendance: 22,000; Referee: Manuel Mejuto González (Spain)

15 October 2008 2010 FIFA World Cup qualifying Group 7	Austria	1–3	Serbia	Vienna, Austria
20:30	Janko 80'	Report	Krasić 15'; Jovanović 18'; Obradović 24'	Stadium: Ernst Happel Stadion; Attendance: 47,998; Referee: Mike Riley (England)

28 March 2009 2010 FIFA World Cup qualifying Group 7	Romania	2–3	Serbia	Constanţa, Romania
19:15	Marica 50'; Stoica 74'	Report	Jovanović 18'; Stoica 44' (o.g.); Ivanović 59'	Stadium: Stadionul Farul; Attendance: 15,000; Referee: Matteo Trefoloni (Italy)

6 June 2009 2010 FIFA World Cup qualifying Group 7	Serbia	1–0	Austria	Belgrade, Serbia
20:30	Milijaš 7' (pen.)	Report		Stadium: Stadion Crvena Zvezda; Attendance: 52,000; Referee: Pieter Vink (Netherlands)

10 June 2009 2010 FIFA World Cup qualifying Group 7	Faroe Islands	0–2	Serbia	Tórshavn, Faroe Islands
19:15		Report	Jovanović 44'; Subotić 69'	Stadium: Tórsvøllur; Attendance: 2,896; Referee: Meir Levi (Israel)

9 September 2009 2010 FIFA World Cup qualifying Group 7	Serbia	1–1	France	Belgrade, Serbia
21:00	Milijaš 12' (pen.)	Report	Henry 36'	Stadium: Stadion Crvena Zvezda; Attendance: 49,456; Referee: Roberto Rosetti (Italy)

10 October 2009 2010 FIFA World Cup qualifying Group 7	Serbia	5–0	Romania	Belgrade, Serbia
20:30	Žigić 37'; Pantelić 50'; Kuzmanović 78'; Jovanović 87', 90+3'	Report		Stadium: Stadion Crvena Zvezda; Attendance: 39,839; Referee: Costas Kapitanis (Cyprus)

14 October 2009 2010 FIFA World Cup qualifying Group 7	Lithuania	2–1	Serbia	Kaunas, Lithuania
20:30	Kalonas 20' (pen.); Stankevičius 68' (pen.)	Report	Tošić 60'	Stadium: Sūduva Stadium; Attendance: 2,000; Referee: Anton Guenov (Bulgaria)

=== Goalscorers during the qualification ===
5 goals

- Milan Jovanović

3 goals

- Branislav Ivanović
- Nikola Žigić

2 goals

- Miloš Krasić
- Nenad Milijaš

1 goal

- Marko Pantelić
- Zdravko Kuzmanović
- Ivan Obradović
- Neven Subotić
- Zoran Tošić
- Jón Rói Jacobsen (Own Goal)
- Dorel Stoica (Own Goal)

=== Attendance ===
Highest	Lowest	Average
49,456 vs. France	9,615 vs. Faroe Islands	32,382

== 2010 FIFA World Cup ==
Pos	Team	Pld	W	D	L	GF	GA	GD	Pts	Qualification
1	Germany	3	2	0	1	5	1	+4	6	Advance to knockout stage
2	Ghana	3	1	1	1	2	2	0	4	Advance to knockout stage
3	Australia	3	1	1	1	3	6	−3	4	
4	Serbia	3	1	0	2	2	3	−1	3	

Source: FIFA
Rules for classification: Tie-breaking criteria

=== Results ===
13 June 2010 2010 FIFA World Cup Group D	Serbia	0–1	Ghana	Pretoria, South Africa
16:00		Report	Gyan 85' (pen.)	Stadium: Loftus Versfeld Stadium; Attendance: 38,833; Referee: Héctor Baldassi (Argentina)

18 June 2010 2010 FIFA World Cup Group D	Germany	0–1	Serbia	Port Elizabeth, South Africa
13:30		Report	Jovanović 38'	Stadium: Nelson Mandela Bay Stadium; Attendance: 38,294; Referee: Alberto Undiano Mallenco (Spain)

23 June 2010 2010 FIFA World Cup Group D	Australia	2–1	Serbia	Nelspruit, South Africa
20:30	Cahill 69'; Holman 73'	Report	Pantelić 84'	Stadium: Mbombela Stadium; Attendance: 37,836; Referee: Jorge Larrionda (Uruguay)

=== Goalscorers ===
1 goal

- Milan Jovanović
- Marko Pantelić

== UEFA Euro 2012 qualifying ==
Pos	Team	Pld	W	D	L	GF	GA	GD	Pts	Qualification
1	Italy	10	8	2	0	20	2	+18	26	Qualify for final tournament
2	Estonia	10	5	1	4	15	14	+1	16	Advance to play-offs
3	Serbia	10	4	3	3	13	12	+1	15	
4	Slovenia	10	4	2	4	11	7	+4	14	
5	Northern Ireland	10	2	3	5	9	13	−4	9	
6	Faroe Islands	10	1	1	8	6	26	−20	4	

Source: UEFA
Rules for classification: Qualification tiebreakers

=== Results ===
3 September 2010 UEFA Euro 2012 qualifying Group C	Faroe Islands	0 – 3	Serbia	Tórshavn, Faroe Islands
19:00		Report	Lazović 14'; Stanković 18'; Žigić 90+1'	Stadium: Tórsvøllur; Attendance: 1,847; Referee: Albert Toussaint (Luxembourg)

7 September 2010 UEFA Euro 2012 qualifying Group C	Serbia	1 – 1	Slovenia	Belgrade, Serbia
20:30	Žigić 86'	Report	Novaković 63'	Stadium: Stadion Crvena Zvezda; Attendance: 24,028; Referee: Olegário Benquerença (Portugal)

8 October 2010 UEFA Euro 2012 qualifying Group C	Serbia	1 – 3	Estonia	Belgrade, Serbia
20:30	Žigić 60'	Report	Kink 63'; Vassiljev 73'; Luković 90+1' (o.g.)	Stadium: Partizan Stadium; Attendance: 12,000; Referee: Maksim Layushkin (Russia)

12 October 2010 UEFA Euro 2012 qualifying Group C	Italy	3 – 0 Awarded (Note: The Italy v Serbia match was abandoned after six minutes due to rioting by Serbian fans. The UEFA Control and Disciplinary Body awarded the match as a 3–0 forfeit win to Italy.)	Serbia	Genoa, Italy
20:50		Report		Stadium: Stadio Luigi Ferraris; Referee: Craig Thomson (Scotland)

March 25, 2011 UEFA Euro 2012 qualifying Group C	Serbia	2 – 1	Northern Ireland	Belgrade, Serbia
	Pantelić 65'; Tošić 74'	Report	McAuley 40'	Stadium: Stadion Crvena Zvezda; Attendance: 0 Referee: Serge Gumienny (Belgium)

March 29, 2011 UEFA Euro 2012 qualifying Group C	Estonia	1 – 1	Serbia	Tallinn, Estonia
	Vassiljev 85'	Report	Pantelić 38'	Stadium: Lilleküla Stadium; Attendance: 5,185; Referee: Hendrikus Bas Nijhuis (Netherland)

September 2, 2011 UEFA Euro 2012 qualifying Group C	Northern Ireland	0 – 1	Serbia	Belfast, Northern Ireland
		Report	Pantelić 67'	Stadium: Windsor Park; Attendance: 15,148; Referee: Thomas Einwaller (Austria)

September 6, 2011 UEFA Euro 2012 qualifying Group C	Serbia	3 – 1	Faroe Islands	Belgrade, Serbia
	Jovanović 6'; Tošić 23'; Kuzmanović 69'	Report	Benjaminsen 37'	Stadium: Stadion FK Partizan; Attendance: 7,500; Referee: Arman Amirkhanyan (Armenia)

October 7, 2011 UEFA Euro 2012 qualifying Group C	Serbia	1 – 1	Italy	Belgrade, Serbia
	Ivanović 26'	Report	Marchisio 1'	Stadium: Stadion Crvena Zvezda; Attendance: 35,000; Referee: Pedro Proenca (Portugal)

October 11, 2011 UEFA Euro 2012 qualifying Group C	Slovenia	1 – 0	Serbia	Maribor, Slovenia
	Vršič 45'	Report		Stadium: Ljudski Vrt; Attendance: 9,848; Referee: Frank De Bleeckere (Belgium)

=== Goalscorers during the qualification ===
3 goals

- Marko Pantelić
- Nikola Žigić

2 goals

- Zoran Tošić

1 goal

- Branislav Ivanović
- Milan Jovanović
- Zdravko Kuzmanović
- Danko Lazović
- Dejan Stanković

=== Attendance ===
Highest	Lowest	Average
35,000 vs. Italy	0 vs. Northern Ireland	15,706

== 2014 FIFA World Cup qualification ==
Pos	Team	Pld	W	D	L	GF	GA	GD	Pts	Qualification	Belgium national football team	Croatia national football team	Serbia national football team	Scotland national football team	Wales national football team	North Macedonia national football team
1	Belgium	10	8	2	0	18	4	+14	26	Qualification to 2014 FIFA World Cup	—	1–1	2–1	2–0	1–1	1–0
2	Croatia	10	5	2	3	12	9	+3	17	Advance to second round	1–2	—	2–0	0–1	2–0	1–0
3	Serbia	10	4	2	4	18	11	+7	14		0–3	1–1	—	2–0	6–1	5–1
4	Scotland	10	3	2	5	8	12	−4	11		0–2	2–0	0–0	—	1–2	1–1
5	Wales	10	3	1	6	9	20	−11	10		0–2	1–2	0–3	2–1	—	1–0
6	Macedonia	10	2	1	7	7	16	−9	7		0–2	1–2	1–0	1–2	2–1	—

=== Results ===
8 September 2012 2014 FIFA World Cup; Qualification Group A	Scotland	0 – 0	Serbia	Glasgow, Scotland
		Report		Stadium: Hampden Park; Attendance: 47,369; Referee: Jonas Eriksson (Sweden)

11 September 2012 2014 FIFA World Cup; Qualification Group A	Serbia	6 – 1	Wales	Novi Sad, Serbia
	Kolarov 16'; Tošić 24'; Đuričić 39'; Tadić 55'; Ivanović 80'; Sulejmani 90'	Report	Bale 31'	Stadium: Stadion Karađorđe; Attendance: 10,660; Referee: Duarte Nuno Pereira Gomes (Portugal)

12 October 2012 2014 FIFA World Cup; Qualification Group A	Serbia	0 – 3	Belgium	Belgrade, Serbia
		Report	Benteke 34'; De Bruyne 68'; Mirallas 91'	Stadium: Stadion Crvena Zvezda; Attendance: 21,650; Referee: Pavel Kralovec (Czech Republic)

16 October 2012 2014 FIFA World Cup; Qualification Group A	Macedonia	1 – 0	Serbia	Skopje, North Macedonia
	Ibraimi 59' (pen.)	Report		Stadium: Philip II Arena; Attendance: 26,181; Referee: Bas Nijhuis (Netherland)

22 March 2013 2014 FIFA World Cup; Qualification Group A	Croatia	2 – 0	Serbia	Zagreb, Croatia
	Mandžukić 23'; Olić 37'	Report		Stadium: Stadion Maksimir; Attendance: 35,722; Referee: Cüneyt Çakır (Turkey)

26 March 2013 2014 FIFA World Cup; Qualification Group A	Serbia	2 – 0	Scotland	Novi Sad, Serbia
	Đuričić 60', 65'	Report		Stadium: Stadion Karađorđe; Attendance: 6,500; Referee: István Vad (Hungary)

7 June 2013 2014 FIFA World Cup; Qualification Group A	Belgium	2 – 1	Serbia	Brussels, Belgium
	De Bruyne 13'; Fellaini 60'	Report	Kolarov 88'	Stadium: Stade Roi Baudouin; Attendance: 45,844; Referee: Stéphane Lannoy (France)

6 September 2013 2014 FIFA World Cup; Qualification Group A	Serbia	1 – 1	Croatia	Belgrade, Serbia
	Mitrović 66'	Report	Mandžukić 53'	Stadium: Stadion Crvena Zvezda; Attendance: 35,000; Referee: Felix Brych (Germany)

10 September 2013 2014 FIFA World Cup; Qualification Group A	Wales	0 – 3	Serbia	Cardiff, Wales
		Report	Đorđević 8'; Kolarov 39'; Marković 55'	Stadium: Cardiff City Stadium; Attendance: 10,293; Referee: Szymon Marciniak (Poland)

15 October 2013 2014 FIFA World Cup; Qualification Group A	Serbia	5 – 1	Macedonia	Jagodina, Serbia
	Ristovski 16' (o.g.); Basta 19'; Kolarov 38' (pen.); Tadić 54'; Stefan Šćepović 74'	Report	Jahović 83'	Stadium: Jagodina City Stadium; Attendance: 8,294; Referee: Richard Trutz (Slovakia)

=== Goalscorers during the qualification ===
4 goals

- Aleksandar Kolarov

3 goals

- Filip Đuričić

2 goals

- Dušan Tadić

1 goal

- Branislav Ivanović
- Zoran Tošić
- Lazar Marković
- Miralem Sulejmani
- Dušan Basta
- Stefan Šćepović
- Aleksandar Mitrović
- Filip Đorđević
- Stefan Ristovski (Own goal)

=== Attendance ===
Highest	Lowest	Average
35,000 vs. Croatia	6,500 vs. Scotland	16,421

== UEFA Euro 2016 qualifying ==
Pos	Team	Pld	W	D	L	GF	GA	GD	Pts	Qualification	(Portugal)	(Albania)	(Denmark)	(Serbia)	(Armenia)
1	Portugal	8	7	0	1	11	5	+6	21	Qualify for final tournament	—	0–1	1–0	2–1	1–0
2	Albania	8	4	2	2	10	5	+5	14	Qualify for final tournament	0–1	—	1–1	0–2	2–1
3	Denmark	8	3	3	2	8	5	+3	12	Advance to play-offs	0–1	0–0	—	2–0	2–1
4	Serbia (Note: The Serbia v Albania match was awarded as a 3–0 win to Albania, and Serbia were also deducted three points, after the match was abandoned at 0–0 because home fans invaded the pitch and attacked Albania players when a drone carried a pro-Albanian flag over the stadium.)	8	2	1	5	8	13	−5	4		1–2	0–3	1–3	—	2–0
5	Armenia	8	0	2	6	5	14	−9	2		2–3	0–3	0–0	1–1	—

Source: UEFA

=== Results ===
11 October 2014 UEFA Euro 2016; Qualification Group I	Armenia	1 – 1	Serbia	Yerevan, Armenia
18:00 UTC+2	Arzumanyan 73'		Tošić 90'	Stadium: Vazgen Sargsyan Republican Stadium; Attendance: 8,500; Referee: Tom Harald Hagen (Norway)

14 October 2014 UEFA Euro 2016; Qualification Group I	Serbia	0 – 3 Awarded	Albania	Belgrade, Serbia
20:45 UTC+2		Report		Stadium: Partizan Stadium; Attendance: 25,200; Referee: Martin Atkinson (England)

14 November 2014 UEFA Euro 2016; Qualification Group I	Serbia	1 – 3	Denmark	Belgrade, Serbia
20:45 UTC+2	Tošić 4'	Report	Bendtner 60', 84'; Kjær 62'	Stadium: Partizan Stadium; Attendance: 0 Referee: Cüneyt Çakır, (Turkey)

29 March 2015 UEFA Euro 2016; Qualification Group I	Portugal	2 – 1	Serbia	Lisbon, Portugal
20:45 UTC+2	R. Carvalho 10'; Coentrão 63'	Report	Matić 61'	Stadium: Estádio da Luz; Attendance: 58,430; Referee: Gianluca Rocchi (Italy)

13 June 2015 UEFA Euro 2016; Qualification Group I	Denmark	2 – 0	Serbia	Copenhagen, Denmark
20:45 UTC+2	Y. Poulsen 13'; J. Poulsen 87'	Report		Stadium: Telia Parken; Attendance: 30,887; Referee: Björn Kuipers (Netherlands)

4 September 2015 UEFA Euro 2016; Qualification Group I	Serbia	2 – 0	Armenia	Novi Sad, Serbia
20:45 UTC+2	Hayrapetyan 22' (o.g.); Ljajić 53'	Report		Stadium: Stadion Karađorđe; Attendance: 0 Referee: Miroslav Zelinka (Czech Republic)

8 October 2015 UEFA Euro 2016; Qualification Group I	Albania	0 – 2	Serbia	Elbasan, Albania
20:45 GMT +2		Report	Kolarov 90+1'; Ljajić 90+4'	Stadium: Elbasan Arena; Attendance: 12,330; Referee: Nicola Rizzoli

11 October 2015 UEFA Euro 2016; Qualification Group I	Serbia	1 – 2	Portugal	Belgrade, Serbia
18:00 GMT +2	Tošić 65'	Report	Nani 5'; Moutinho 78'	Stadium: Partizan Stadium; Attendance: 7,485; Referee: David Fernández Borbalán (Spain)

=== Goalscorers during the qualification ===
3 goals

- Zoran Tošić

2 goals

- Adem Ljajić

1 goal

- Nemanja Matić
- Aleksandar Kolarov
- Levon Hayrapetyan (Own Goal)

=== Attendance ===
Highest	Lowest	Average
25,200 vs. Albania	0 vs. Armenia and Denmark	8,171

== 2018 FIFA World Cup qualification ==
Pos	Team	Pld	W	D	L	GF	GA	GD	Pts	Qualification
1	Serbia	10	6	3	1	20	10	+10	21	Qualification to 2018 FIFA World Cup
2	Republic of Ireland	10	5	4	1	12	6	+6	19	Advance to second round
3	Wales	10	4	5	1	13	6	+7	17	
4	Austria	10	4	3	3	14	12	+2	15	
5	Georgia	10	0	5	5	8	14	−6	5	
6	Moldova	10	0	2	8	4	23	−19	2	

Source: FIFA
Rules for classification: Qualification tiebreakers

=== Results ===
5 September 2016 2018 FIFA World Cup; Qualification Group D	Serbia	2 – 2	Republic of Ireland	Belgrade, Serbia
20:45 (20:45 UTC+2)	Kostić 62'; Tadić 69' (pen.)	Report	Hendrick 3'; Murphy 81'	Stadium: Rajko Mitić Stadium; Attendance: 7,896; Referee: Viktor Kassai (Hungary)

6 October 2016 2018 FIFA World Cup; Qualification Group D	Moldova	0 – 3	Serbia	Chișinău, Moldova
20:45 (21:45 UTC+3)		Report	Kostić 19'; Ivanović 37'; Tadić 59'	Stadium: Zimbru Stadium; Attendance: 6,192; Referee: Aleksei Kulbakov (Belarus)

9 October 2016 2018 FIFA World Cup; Qualification Group D	Serbia	3 – 2	Austria	Belgrade, Serbia
20:45 (20:45 UTC+2)	A.Mitrović 6', 23'; Tadić 74'	Report	Sabitzer 16'; Janko 62'	Stadium: Rajko Mitić Stadium; Attendance: 14,200; Referee: Jonas Eriksson (Sweden)

12 November 2016 2018 FIFA World Cup; Qualification Group D	Wales	1 – 1	Serbia	Cardiff, Wales
20:45 (19:45 UTC±0)	Gareth Bale 30'	Report	A.Mitrović 86'	Stadium: Cardiff City Stadium; Attendance: 32,879; Referee: Alberto Undiano Mallenco (Spain)

24 March 2017 2018 FIFA World Cup; Qualification Group D	Georgia	1 – 3	Serbia	Tbilisi Georgia
18:00 (21:00 UTC+4)	Kacharava 6'	Report (FIFA); Report (UEFA)	Tadić 45' (pen.); A. Mitrović 64'; Gaćinović 86'	Stadium: Boris Paichadze Dinamo Arena, Tbilisi; Attendance: 31,328; Referee: Felix Zwayer (Germany)

11 June 2017 2018 FIFA World Cup; Qualification Group D	Serbia	1 – 1	Wales	Belgrade, Serbia
20:45 (20:45 UTC+2)	A. Mitrović 74'	Report (UEFA)	Ramsey 35' (pen.)	Stadium: Rajko Mitić Stadium; Attendance: 46,673; Referee: Jorge Sousa (Portugal)

2 September 2017 2018 FIFA World Cup; Qualification Group D	Serbia	3 – 0	Moldova	Belgrade, Serbia
18:00 (18:00 UTC+2)	Gaćinović 20'; Kolarov 30'; A. Mitrović 81'	Report (UEFA)		Stadium: Partizan Stadium; Attendance: 9,974; Referee: Tamás Bognar (Hungary)

5 September 2017 2018 FIFA World Cup; Qualification Group D	Republic of Ireland	0 – 1	Serbia	Dublin, Republic of Ireland
20:45 (19:45 UTC+1)		Report (UEFA)	Kolarov 55'	Stadium: Aviva Stadium; Attendance: 50,153; Referee: Cüneyt Çakır (Turkey)

6 October 2017 2018 FIFA World Cup; Qualification Group D	Austria	3 – 2	Serbia	Wien, Austria
20:45 (20:45 UTC+2)	Burgstaller 25'; Arnautović 76'; Schaub 89'	Report (UEFA)	Milivojević 11'; Matić 83'	Stadium: Ernst-Happel-Stadion; Attendance: 42,400; Referee: Pavel Královec (Czech Republic)

9 October 2017 2018 FIFA World Cup; Qualification Group D	Serbia	1 – 0	Georgia	Belgrade, Serbia
20:45 (20:45 UTC+2)	Prijović 74'	Report (UEFA)		Stadium: Red Star Stadium; Attendance: 42,000; Referee: Pawel Gil (Poland)

=== Goalscorers during the qualification ===
6 goals

- Aleksandar Mitrović

4 goals

- Dušan Tadić

2 goals

- Aleksandar Kolarov
- Filip Kostić
- Mijat Gaćinović

1 goal

- Branislav Ivanović
- Nemanja Matić
- Luka Milivojević
- Aleksandar Prijović

=== Attendance ===
Highest	Lowest	Average
46,673 vs. Wales	7,896 vs. Republic of Ireland	24,149

== 2018 FIFA World Cup ==
Pos	Team	Pld	W	D	L	GF	GA	GD	Pts	Qualification
1	Brazil	3	2	1	0	5	1	+4	7	Advance to knockout stage
2	Switzerland	3	1	2	0	5	4	+1	5	Advance to knockout stage
3	Serbia	3	1	0	2	2	4	−2	3	
4	Costa Rica	3	0	1	2	2	5	−3	1	

Source: FIFA
Rules for classification: Group stage tiebreakers

=== Results ===
17 June 2018 2018 FIFA World Cup Group E	Costa Rica	0 – 1	Serbia	Samara, Russia
16:00 SAMT (UTC+4)		Report	Kolarov 56'	Stadium: Cosmos Arena; Attendance: 41,432; Referee: Malang Diedhiou (Senegal)

22 June 2018 2018 FIFA World Cup Group E	Serbia	1 – 2	Switzerland	Kaliningrad, Russia
20:00 KALT (UTC+2)	Mitrović 5'	Report	Xhaka 52'; Shaqiri 90'	Stadium: Kaliningrad Stadium; Attendance: 33,167; Referee: Felix Brych (Germany)

27 June 2018 2018 FIFA World Cup Group E	Serbia	0 – 2	Brazil	Moscow, Russia
21:00 MSK (UTC+3)		Report	Paulinho 36'; Thiago Silva 68'	Stadium: Spartak Stadium; Attendance: 44,190; Referee: Alireza Faghani (Iran)

=== Goalscorers ===
1 goal

- Aleksandar Kolarov
- Aleksandar Mitrović

== 2018–19 UEFA Nations League ==
Pos	Team	Pld	W	D	L	GF	GA	GD	Pts	Promotion (Note: Due to revamp of the format for the 2020–21 UEFA Nations League, no teams were eventually relegated, and the second-placed teams in each group were also promoted.)	(Serbia)	(Romania)	(Montenegro)	(Lithuania)
1	Serbia (P)	6	4	2	0	11	4	+7	14	Promotion to League B	—	2–2	2–1	4–1
2	Romania (P)	6	3	3	0	8	3	+5	12	Promotion to League B	0–0	—	0–0	3–0
3	Montenegro	6	2	1	3	7	6	+1	7		0–2	0–1	—	2–0
4	Lithuania	6	0	0	6	3	16	−13	0		0–1	1–2	1–4	—

Source: UEFA
Rules for classification: Tiebreakers
(P) Promoted

=== Results ===
7 September 2018 2018–19 UEFA Nations League C Group 4	Lithuania	0 – 1	Serbia	Vilnius, Lithuania
20:45		Report	Tadić 38' (pen.)	Stadium: LFF Stadium; Attendance: 4,378; Referee: Bobby Madden (Scotland)

10 September 2018 2018–19 UEFA Nations League C Group 4	Serbia	2 – 2	Romania	Belgrade, Serbia
20:45	Mitrović 26', 63'	Report	Stanciu 48' (pen.); Țucudean 68'	Stadium: Partizan Stadium; Attendance: 15,496; Referee: Vladislav Bezborodov (Russia)

11 October 2018 2018–19 UEFA Nations League C Group 4	Montenegro	0 – 2	Serbia	Podgorica, Montenegro
20:45		Report	Mitrović 18' (pen.), 81'	Stadium: Podgorica City Stadium; Attendance: 9,394; Referee: Gianluca Rocchi (Italy)

14 October 2018 2018–19 UEFA Nations League C Group 4	Romania	0 – 0	Serbia	Bucharest, Romania
15:00		Report		Stadium: Arena Națională; Attendance: 48,513; Referee: Kevin Blom (Netherlands)

17 November 2018 2018–19 UEFA Nations League C Group 4	Serbia	2 – 1	Montenegro	Belgrade, Serbia
15:00	Ljajić 30'; Mitrović 32'	Report	Mugoša 70'	Stadium: Red Star Stadium; Attendance: 15,416; Referee: Alberto Undiano Mallenco (Spain)

20 November 2018 2018–19 UEFA Nations League C Group 4	Serbia	4 – 1	Lithuania	Belgrade, Serbia
20:45	Žulpa 51' (o.g.); Mitrović 58'; Prijović 71'; Ljajić 74'	Report	Petravičius 64'	Stadium: Partizan Stadium; Attendance: 2,088; Referee: Kristo Tohver (Estonia)

=== Goalscorers during the competition ===
6 goals

- Aleksandar Mitrović

2 goals

- Adem Ljajić

1 goals

- Dušan Tadić
- Aleksandar Prijović
- Artūras Žulpa (Own Goal)

=== Attendance ===
Highest	Lowest	Average
14,496 vs. Romania	2,088 vs. Lithuania	11,000

== UEFA Euro 2020 qualifying ==
Pos	Team	Pld	W	D	L	GF	GA	GD	Pts	Qualification
1	Ukraine	8	6	2	0	17	4	+13	20	Qualify for final tournament
2	Portugal	8	5	2	1	22	6	+16	17	Qualify for final tournament
3	Serbia	8	4	2	2	17	17	0	14	Advance to play-offs via Nations League
4	Luxembourg	8	1	1	6	7	16	−9	4	
5	Lithuania	8	0	1	7	5	25	−20	1	

Source: UEFA
Rules for classification: Qualification tiebreakers

=== Results ===
25 March 2019 UEFA Euro 2020 qualifying Group B	Portugal	1 – 1	Serbia	Lisbon, Portugal
20:45	Pereira 42'	Report	Tadić 7' (pen.)	Stadium: Estádio da Luz; Attendance: 50,342; Referee: Szymon Marciniak (Poland)

7 June 2019 UEFA Euro 2020 qualifying Group B	Ukraine	5 – 0	Serbia	Lviv, Ukraine
20:45	Tsyhankov 26' 28'; Konoplyanka 46' 75'; Yaremchuk 59'	Report		Stadium: Arena Lviv; Attendance: 34,915; Referee: Antonio Mateu Lahoz (Spain)

10 June 2019 UEFA Euro 2020 qualifying Group B	Serbia	4 – 1	Lithuania	Belgrade, Serbia
20:45	Mitrović 20', 34'; Jović 35'; Ljajić 90+2'	Report	Novikovas 70' (pen.)	Stadium: Red Star Stadium; Attendance: 0 Referee: Adrien Jaccottet (Switzerland)
Note: The Serbia v Lithuania match was played behind closed doors due to a UEFA punishment against Serbia for racist behaviour in their UEFA Nations League home match against Montenegro.

7 September 2019 UEFA Euro 2020 qualifying Group B	Serbia	2 – 4	Portugal	Belgrade, Serbia
20:45	Milenković 68'; Mitrović 85'	Report	Carvalho 42'; Guedes 58'; Ronaldo 80'; Silva 86'	Stadium: Red Star Stadium; Attendance: 39,839; Referee: Cüneyt Çakır (Turkey)

10 September 2019 UEFA Euro 2020 qualifying Group B	Luxembourg	1 – 3	Serbia	Luxembourg City, Luxembourg
20:45	Turpel 66'	Report	A. Mitrović 36', 78'; Radonjić 55'	Stadium: Stade Josy Barthel; Attendance: 6,373; Referee: Orel Grinfeld (Israel)

14 October 2019 UEFA Euro 2020 qualifying Group B	Lithuania	1 – 2	Serbia	Vilnius, Lithuania
20:45	Kazlauskas 79'	Report	Mitrović 49', 53'	Stadium: LFF Stadium; Referee: Paweł Raczkowski (Poland)

14 November 2019 UEFA Euro 2020 qualifying Group B	Serbia	3 – 2	Luxembourg	Belgrade, Serbia
20:45	Mitrović 11', 43'; Radonjić 70'	Report	Rodrigues 54'; Turpel 75'	Stadium: Red Star Stadium; Attendance: 500 (Note: Serbia were sanctioned by UEFA to play one home match (against Luxembourg on 14 November 2019) without spectators for racist behaviour in their home match against Portugal.); Referee: Serdar Gözübüyük (Netherlands)

17 November 2019 UEFA Euro 2020 qualifying Group B	Serbia	2 – 2	Ukraine	Belgrade, Serbia
15:00	Tadić 9' (pen.); Mitrović 56'	Report	Yaremchuk 33'; Besyedin 90+3'	Stadium: Red Star Stadium; Attendance: 3,000; Referee: Bobby Madden (Scotland)

=== Play-off ===
==== Semi-final ====
8 October 2020 UEFA Euro 2020 qualifying play-offs Path C SF	Norway	1 – 2 (a.e.t.)	Serbia	Oslo, Norway
20:45	Normann 88'	Report	Milinković-Savić 82', 102'	Stadium: Ullevaal Stadion; Referee: Daniele Orsato (Italy)

==== Final ====
12 November 2020 UEFA Euro 2020 qualifying play-offs Path C F	Serbia	1 – 1 (a.e.t.) (4 – 5 p)	Scotland	Belgrade, Serbia
20:45	Jović 90'	Report	Christie 52'	Stadium: Rajko Mitić Stadium; Attendance: 0 Referee: Antonio Mateu Lahoz (Spain)
	Penalties
	Tadić (penalty scored); Jović (penalty scored); Gudelj (penalty scored); Katai (penalty scored); A. Mitrović (penalty missed)		(penalty scored) Griffiths; (penalty scored) McGregor; (penalty scored) McTominay; (penalty scored) McBurnie; (penalty scored) McLean

=== Goalscorers during the qualification ===
10 goals

- Aleksandar Mitrović

2 goals

- Nemanja Radonjić
- Dušan Tadić
- Luka Jović
- Sergej Milinković-Savić

1 goal

- Adem Ljajić
- Nikola Milenković

== 2020–21 UEFA Nations League ==
Pos	Team	Pld	W	D	L	GF	GA	GD	Pts	Promotion or relegation	(Hungary)	(Russia)	(Serbia)	(Turkey)
1	Hungary (P)	6	3	2	1	7	4	+3	11	Promotion to League A	—	2–3	1–1	2–0
2	Russia	6	2	2	2	9	12	−3	8		0–0	—	3–1	1–1
3	Serbia	6	1	3	2	9	7	+2	6 (Note: Tied on head-to-head points (2) and head-to-head goal difference (0). Head-to-head away goals: Serbia 2, Turkey 0.)		0–1	5–0	—	0–0
4	Turkey (R)	6	1	3	2	6	8	−2	6	Relegation to League C	0–1	3–2	2–2	—

Source: UEFA
Rules for classification: Tiebreakers
(P) Promoted; (R) Relegated

=== Results ===
3 September 2020 2020–21 UEFA Nations League B Group 3	Russia	3–1	Serbia	Moscow, Russia
20:45	Dzyuba 48' (pen.), 81'; Karavayev 69'	Report	Mitrović 78'	Stadium: VTB Arena; Attendance: 0 Referee: William Collum (Scotland)

6 September 2020 2020–21 UEFA Nations League B Group 3	Serbia	0–0	Turkey	Belgrade, Serbia
20:45		Report		Stadium: Rajko Mitić Stadium; Attendance: 0 Referee: Aleksei Kulbakov (Belarus)

11 October 2020 2020–21 UEFA Nations League B Group 3	Serbia	0–1	Hungary	Belgrade, Serbia
20:45		Report	Könyves 20'	Stadium: Rajko Mitić Stadium; Attendance: 0 Referee: Sandro Schärer (Switzerland)

14 October 2020 2020–21 UEFA Nations League B Group 3	Turkey	2–2	Serbia	Istanbul, Turkey
20:45	Çalhanoğlu 57'; Tufan 76'	Report	Milinković-Savić 22'; Mitrović 49' (pen.)	Stadium: Türk Telekom Stadium; Attendance: 0 Referee: Georgi Kabakov (Bulgaria)

15 November 2020 2020–21 UEFA Nations League B Group 3	Hungary	1–1	Serbia	Budapest, Hungary
20:45	Kalmár 39'	Report	Radonjić 17'	Stadium: Puskás Aréna; Attendance: 0 Referee: Glenn Nyberg (Sweden)

18 November 2020 2020–21 UEFA Nations League B Group 3	Serbia	5–0	Russia	Belgrade, Serbia
20:45	Radonjić 10'; Jović 25', 45+1'; Vlahović 41'; Mladenović 64'	Report		Stadium: Rajko Mitić Stadium; Attendance: 0 Referee: Anthony Taylor (England)

=== Goalscorers during the competition ===
2 goals

- Luka Jović
- Aleksandar Mitrović
- Nemanja Radonjić

1 goal

- Sergej Milinković-Savić
- Filip Mladenović
- Dušan Vlahović

== 2022 FIFA World Cup qualification ==
Pos	Team	Pld	W	D	L	GF	GA	GD	Pts	Qualification
1	Serbia	8	6	2	0	18	9	+9	20	Qualification for 2022 FIFA World Cup
2	Portugal	8	5	2	1	17	6	+11	17	Advance to play-offs
3	Republic of Ireland	8	2	3	3	11	8	+3	9	
4	Luxembourg	8	3	0	5	8	18	−10	9	
5	Azerbaijan	8	0	1	7	5	18	−13	1	

Source: FIFA, UEFA
Rules for classification: Tiebreakers

=== Results ===
24 March 2021 2022 FIFA World Cup qualification	Serbia	3–2	Republic of Ireland	Belgrade, Serbia
20:45	Vlahović 40'; A. Mitrović 69', 76'	Report (FIFA); Report (UEFA)	Browne 18'; Collins 86'	Stadium: Rajko Mitić Stadium; Attendance: 0 Referee: Davide Massa (Italy)

27 March 2021 2022 FIFA World Cup qualification	Serbia	2–2	Portugal	Belgrade, Serbia
20:45	A. Mitrović 46'; Kostić 60'	Report (FIFA); Report (UEFA)	Jota 11', 36'	Stadium: Rajko Mitić Stadium; Attendance: 0 Referee: Danny Makkelie (Netherlands)

30 March 2021 2022 FIFA World Cup qualification	Azerbaijan	1–2	Serbia	Baku, Azerbaijan
18:00	Mahmudov 59' (pen.)	Report (FIFA); Report (UEFA)	A. Mitrović 16', 81'	Stadium: Baku Olympic Stadium; Attendance: 0 Referee: Roi Reinshreiber (Israel)

4 September 2021 2022 FIFA World Cup qualification	Serbia	4–1	Luxembourg	Belgrade, Serbia
18:00	Mitrović 22', 35'; Chanot 82' (o.g.); Milenković 90+6'	Report (FIFA); Report (UEFA)	O. Thill 77'	Stadium: Rajko Mitić Stadium; Attendance: 10,078; Referee: Halil Umut Meler (Turkey)

7 September 2021 2022 FIFA World Cup qualification	Republic of Ireland	1–1	Serbia	Dublin, Ireland
20:45	Milenković 87' (o.g.)	Report (FIFA); Report (UEFA)	Milinković-Savić 20'	Stadium: Aviva Stadium; Attendance: 25,415; Referee: José María Sánchez (Spain)

9 October 2021 2022 FIFA World Cup qualification	Luxembourg	0–1	Serbia	Luxembourg City, Luxembourg
20:45		Report (FIFA); Report (UEFA)	Vlahović 68'	Stadium: Stade de Luxembourg; Attendance: 2,000; Referee: William Collum (Scotland)

12 October 2021 2022 FIFA World Cup qualification	Serbia	3–1	Azerbaijan	Belgrade, Serbia
20:45	Vlahović 30' (pen.), 53'; Tadić 83' (pen.)	Report (FIFA); Report (UEFA)	Mahmudov 45+2'	Stadium: Rajko Mitić Stadium; Attendance: 5,890; Referee: Erik Lambrechts (Belgium)

14 November 2021 2022 FIFA World Cup qualification	Portugal	1–2	Serbia	Lisbon, Portugal
20:45	Sanches 2'	Report	Tadić 33'; Mitrović 90'	Stadium: Estadio Jose Alvalade; Attendance: 58,873; Referee: Daniele Orsato (Italy)

=== Goalscorers during the competition ===
8 goals

- Aleksandar Mitrović

4 goals

- Dušan Vlahović

2 goals

- Dušan Tadić

1 goal

- Filip Kostić
- Nikola Milenković
- Sergej Milinković-Savić

== 2022–23 UEFA Nations League ==
Pos	Team	Pld	W	D	L	GF	GA	GD	Pts	Promotion or relegation	(Serbia)	(Norway)	(Slovenia)	(Sweden)
1	Serbia (P)	6	4	1	1	13	5	+8	13	Promotion to League A	—	0–1	4–1	4–1
2	Norway	6	3	1	2	7	7	0	10		0–2	—	0–0	3–2
3	Slovenia	6	1	3	2	6	10	−4	6		2–2	2–1	—	0–2
4	Sweden (R)	6	1	1	4	7	11	−4	4	Relegation to League C	0–1	1–2	1–1	—

Source: UEFA
Rules for classification: Tiebreakers
(P) Promoted; (R) Relegated

=== Results ===
2 June 2022 2022–23 UEFA Nations League	Serbia	0–1	Norway	Belgrade, Serbia
20:45		Report	Haaland 26'	Stadium: Rajko Mitić Stadium; Attendance: 9,726; Referee: Paweł Raczkowski (Poland)

5 June 2022 2022–23 UEFA Nations League	Serbia	4–1	Slovenia	Belgrade, Serbia
20:45	Mitrović 24'; Milinković-Savić 56'; Jović 85'; Radonjić 90+2'	Report	Stojanović 30'	Stadium: Rajko Mitić Stadium; Attendance: 10,925; Referee: Jesús Gil Manzano (Spain)

9 June 2022 2022–23 UEFA Nations League	Sweden	0–1	Serbia	Solna, Sweden
20:45		Report	Jović 45+3'	Stadium: Friends Arena; Attendance: 24,123; Referee: Lawrence Visser (Belgium)

12 June 2022 2022–23 UEFA Nations League	Slovenia	2–2	Serbia	Ljubljana, Slovenia
20:45	Gnezda Čerin 48'; Šeško 53'	Report	Živković 8'; A. Mitrović 35'	Stadium: Stožice Stadium; Attendance: 13,782; Referee: Maurizio Mariani (Italy)

24 September 2022 2022–23 UEFA Nations League	Serbia	4–1	Sweden	Belgrade, Serbia
20:45	A. Mitrović 18', 45+1', 50'; Lukić 70'	Report	Claesson 15'	Stadium: Rajko Mitić Stadium; Attendance: 14,122; Referee: Georgi Kabakov (Bulgaria)

27 September 2022 2022–23 UEFA Nations League	Norway	0–2	Serbia	Oslo, Norway
20:45		Report	Vlahović 42'; Mitrović 54'	Stadium: Ullevaal Stadion; Attendance: 24,364; Referee: Mateu Lahoz (Spain)

=== Goalscorers during the competition ===
6 goals

- Aleksandar Mitrović

2 goals

- Luka Jović

1 goal

- Sergej Milinković-Savić
- Andrija Živković
- Nemanja Radonjić
- Saša Lukić
- Dušan Vlahović

== 2022 FIFA World Cup ==
Pos	Team	Pld	W	D	L	GF	GA	GD	Pts	Qualification
1	Brazil	3	2	0	1	3	1	+2	6	Advance to knockout stage
2	Switzerland	3	2	0	1	4	3	+1	6	Advance to knockout stage
3	Cameroon	3	1	1	1	4	4	0	4	
4	Serbia	3	0	1	2	5	8	−3	1	

Source: FIFA
Rules for classification: Group stage tiebreakers

=== Results ===
24 November 2022 2022 FIFA World Cup Group G	Brazil	2–0	Serbia	Lusail, Qatar
22:00	Richarlison 62', 73'	Report		Stadium: Lusail Iconic Stadium; Attendance: 88,103; Referee: Alireza Faghani (Iran)

28 November 2022 2022 FIFA World Cup Group G	Cameroon	3–3	Serbia	Al Wakrah, Qatar
13:00	Castelletto 29'; Aboubakar 63'; Choupo-Moting 66'	Report	Pavlović 45+1'; S. Milinković-Savić 45+3'; A. Mitrović 53'	Stadium: Al Janoub Stadium; Attendance: 39,789; Referee: Mohammed Abdulla Hassan Mohamed (United Arab Emirates)

2 December 2022 2022 FIFA World Cup Group G	Serbia	2–3	Switzerland	Doha, Qatar
22:00	A. Mitrović 26'; Vlahović 35'	Report	Shaqiri 20'; Embolo 44'; Freuler 48'	Stadium: Stadium 974; Attendance: 41,378; Referee: Fernando Rapallini (Argentina)

=== Goalscorers during the competition ===
2 goals

- Aleksandar Mitrović

1 goal

- Sergej Milinković-Savić
- Dušan Vlahović
- Strahinja Pavlović

== UEFA Euro 2024 qualifying ==
Pos	Team	Pld	W	D	L	GF	GA	GD	Pts	Qualification
1	Hungary	8	5	3	0	16	7	+9	18	Qualify for final tournament
2	Serbia	8	4	2	2	15	9	+6	14	Qualify for final tournament
3	Montenegro	8	3	2	3	9	11	−2	11	
4	Lithuania	8	1	3	4	8	14	−6	6	
5	Bulgaria	8	0	4	4	7	14	−7	4	

Source: UEFA
Rules for classification: Qualification tiebreakers

=== Results ===
24 March 2023 UEFA Euro 2024 qualifying	Serbia	2–0	Lithuania	Belgrade, Serbia
20:45	Tadić 16'; Vlahović 53'	Report		Stadium: Stadion Rajko Mitić; Attendance: 21,125; Referee: Lawrence Visser (Belgium)

27 March 2023 UEFA Euro 2024 qualifying	Montenegro	0–2	Serbia	Podgorica, Montenegro
20:45		Report	Vlahović 78', 90+6'	Stadium: Podgorica City Stadium; Attendance: 9,831; Referee: Clément Turpin (France)

20 June 2023 UEFA Euro 2024 qualifying	Bulgaria	1–1	Serbia	Razgrad, Bulgaria
20:45	Despodov 47'	Report	Lazović 90+6'	Stadium: Huvepharma Arena; Attendance: 6,700; Referee: Craig Pawson (England)

7 September 2023 UEFA Euro 2024 qualifying	Serbia	1–2	Hungary	Belgrade, Serbia
20:45	A.Szalai 10' (o.g.)	Report	Varga 34'; Orbán 36'	Stadium: Rajko Mitić Stadium; Attendance: 6,924; Referee: Juan Martinez Munuera (Spain)

10 September 2023 UEFA Euro 2024 qualifying	Lithuania	1–3	Serbia	Kaunas, Lithuania
20:45	Paulauskas 45'	Report	A.Mitrović 21', 32', 43'	Stadium: Darius and Girėnas Stadium; Attendance: 8,586; Referee: Sascha Stegemann (Germany)

14 October 2023 UEFA Euro 2024 qualifying	Hungary	2–1	Serbia	Budapest, Hungary
20:45	Varga 20'; Sallai 34'	Report	Pavlović 33'	Stadium: Puskás Aréna; Attendance: 58,215; Referee: François Letexier (France)

17 October 2023 UEFA Euro 2024 qualifying	Serbia	3–1	Montenegro	Belgrade, Serbia
20:45	Mitrović 9', 73'; Tadić 77'	Report	Jovetić 36'	Stadium: Rajko Mitić Stadium; Attendance: 25,884; Referee: Szymon Marciniak (Poland)

19 November 2023 UEFA Euro 2024 qualifying	Serbia	2–2	Bulgaria	Leskovac, Serbia
15:00	Veljković 17'; Babić 82'	Report	Rusev 59'; Despodov 69'	Stadium: Dubočica Stadium; Attendance: 7,325; Referee: Erik Lambrechts (Belgium)

=== Goalscorers during the competition ===
5 goals

- Aleksandar Mitrović

3 goals

- Dušan Vlahović

2 goals

- Dušan Tadić

1 goal

- Srđan Babić
- Darko Lazović
- Strahinja Pavlović
- Miloš Veljković
- Attila Szalai (own goal)

== UEFA Euro 2024 ==
Pos	Team	Pld	W	D	L	GF	GA	GD	Pts	Qualification
1	England	3	1	2	0	2	1	+1	5	Advance to knockout stage
2	Denmark	3	0	3	0	2	2	0	3 (Note: Tied on head-to-head result (Slovenia 1–1 Denmark), overall goal difference and overall goals scored. Disciplinary points: Denmark −6, Slovenia −7.)	Advance to knockout stage
3	Slovenia	3	0	3	0	2	2	0	3	Advance to knockout stage
4	Serbia	3	0	2	1	1	2	−1	2	

Source: UEFA

=== Results ===
16 June 2024 UEFA Euro 2024 Group C	Serbia	0–1	England	Gelsenkirchen, Germany
21:00		Report	Bellingham 13'	Stadium: Arena AufSchalke; Attendance: 48,953; Referee: Daniele Orsato (Italy)

20 June 2024 UEFA Euro 2024 Group C	Slovenia	1–1	Serbia	Munich, Germany
15:00	Karničnik 69'	Report	Jović 90+5'	Stadium: Allianz Arena; Attendance: 63,028; Referee: István Kovács (Romania)

25 June 2024 UEFA Euro 2024 Group C	Denmark	0–0	Serbia	Munich, Germany
21:00		Report		Stadium: Allianz Arena; Attendance: 64,288; Referee: François Letexier (France)

=== Goalscorers during the competition ===
1 goal

- Luka Jović

== 2024–25 UEFA Nations League ==
=== League A – Group 4 ===
Pos	Team	Pld	W	D	L	GF	GA	GD	Pts	Qualification or relegation	(Spain)	(Denmark)	(Serbia)	(Switzerland)
1	Spain	6	5	1	0	13	4	+9	16	Advance to quarter-finals	—	1–0	3–0	3–2
2	Denmark	6	2	2	2	7	5	+2	8	Advance to quarter-finals	1–2	—	2–0	2–0
3	Serbia (O)	6	1	3	2	3	6	−3	6	Qualification for relegation play-offs	0–0	0–0	—	2–0
4	Switzerland (R)	6	0	2	4	6	14	−8	2	Relegation to League B	1–4	2–2	1–1	—

Source: UEFA
Rules for classification: Tiebreakers
(O) Play-off winners; (R) Relegated

==== Results ====
5 September 2024 2024–25 UEFA Nations League	Serbia	0–0	Spain	Belgrade, Serbia
20:45	Eraković (yellow card) 5'; Birmančević (yellow card) 43'; Belić (yellow card) 69'	Report	Pérez (yellow card) 21'; Carvajal (yellow card) 27'; Yamal (yellow card) 41'; Le Normand (yellow card) 59'; Olmo (yellow card) 67'; de la Fuente (yellow card) 85'	Stadium: Rajko Mitić Stadium; Attendance: 29,981; Referee: Serdar Gözübüyük (Netherlands)

8 September 2024 2024–25 UEFA Nations League	Denmark	2–0	Serbia	Copenhagen, Denmark
18:00	Grønbæk 36'; Andersen (yellow card) 51'; Kristiansen (yellow card) 59'; Poulsen 61'	Report	Lukić (yellow card) 69'; S. Mitrović (yellow card) 71'; Pavlović (yellow card) 71'	Stadium: Parken Stadium; Attendance: 34,902; Referee: Chris Kavanagh (England)

12 October 2024 2024–25 UEFA Nations League	Serbia	2–0	Switzerland	Leskovac, Serbia
20:45	Elvedi 45+1' (o.g.); A. Mitrović 61'; Nedeljković (yellow card) 71'; Simić (yellow card) 84'; Samardžić (yellow card) 90+3'	Report	Widmer (yellow card) 23'; Elvedi (yellow card) 44'; Embolo (penalty missed) 72'	Stadium: Dubočica Stadium; Attendance: 6,383; Referee: Simone Sozza (Italy)

15 October 2024 2024–25 UEFA Nations League	Spain	3–0	Serbia	Córdoba, Spain
20:45	Laporte 5'; Oyarzabal (yellow card) 7'; Morata (penalty missed) 54' 65'; Baena 77'	Report	Eraković (yellow card) 38'; A. Mitrović (yellow card) 53'; Milenković (yellow card) 54'; Pavlović (red card) 76'; Jović (yellow card) 90+1'	Stadium: Estadio Nuevo Arcángel; Attendance: 20,345; Referee: Daniel Stefański (Poland)

15 November 2024 2024–25 UEFA Nations League	Switzerland	1–1	Serbia	Zurich, Switzerland
20:45	Amdouni 78'	Report	Terzić 88'	Stadium: Letzigrund; Attendance: 21,115; Referee: Clément Turpin (France)

18 November 2024 2024–25 UEFA Nations League	Serbia	0–0	Denmark	Leskovac, Serbia
20:45		Report		Stadium: Dubočica Stadium; Attendance: 7,295; Referee: Felix Zwayer (Germany)

=== Promotion/relegation play-offs ===
20 March 2025 2024–25 UEFA Nations League promotion/relegation play-offs	Austria	1–1	Serbia	Vienna, Austria
20:45	Gregoritsch 37'	Report	Samardžić 61'	Stadium: Ernst-Happel-Stadion; Attendance: 46,400; Referee: João Pinheiro (Portugal)

23 March 2025 2024–25 UEFA Nations League promotion/relegation play-offs	Serbia	2–0	Austria	Belgrade, Serbia
18:00	Maksimović 56'; Vlahović 90+1'	Report		Stadium: Rajko Mitić Stadium; Attendance: 22,112; Referee: José María Sánchez (Spain)

=== Goalscorers during the competition ===
1 goal

- Aleksandar Mitrović
- Aleksa Terzić
- Lazar Samardžić
- Nemanja Maksimović
- Dušan Vlahović
- Nico Elvedi (own goal)

== 2026 FIFA World Cup qualification ==
Pos	Team	Pld	W	D	L	GF	GA	GD	Pts	Qualification	(England national football team)	(Albania national football team)	(Serbia national football team)	(Latvia national football team)	(Andorra national football team)
1	England	8	8	0	0	22	0	+22	24	Qualification for 2026 FIFA World Cup	—	2–0	2–0	3–0	2–0
2	Albania	8	4	2	2	7	5	+2	14	Advance to play-offs	0–2	—	0–0	1–0	3–0
3	Serbia	8	4	1	3	9	10	−1	13		0–5	0–1	—	2–1	3–0
4	Latvia	8	1	2	5	5	15	−10	5		0–5	1–1	0–1	—	2–2
5	Andorra	8	0	1	7	3	16	−13	1		0–1	0–1	1–3	0–1	—

Source: FIFA, UEFA
Rules for classification: Tiebreakers

=== Results ===
7 June 2025 2026 FIFA World Cup qualification	Albania	0–0	Serbia	Tirana, Albania
20:45		Report (FIFA); Report (UEFA)		Stadium: Arena Kombëtare; Attendance: 20,427; Referee: Davide Massa (Italy)

10 June 2025 2026 FIFA World Cup qualification	Serbia	3–0	Andorra	Leskovac, Serbia
20:45	Mitrović 12', 24', 53' (pen.)	Report (FIFA); Report (UEFA)		Stadium: Dubočica Stadium; Attendance: 7,576; Referee: Aliyar Aghayev (Azerbaijan)

6 September 2025 2026 FIFA World Cup qualification	Latvia	0–1	Serbia	Riga, Latvia
15:00		Report (FIFA); Report (UEFA)	Vlahović 12'	Stadium: Daugava Stadium; Attendance: 6,238; Referee: Julian Weinberger (Austria)

9 September 2025 2026 FIFA World Cup qualification	Serbia	0–5	England	Belgrade, Serbia
20:45		Report (FIFA); Report (UEFA)	Kane 33'; Madueke 35'; Konsa 52'; Guéhi 75'; Rashford 90' (pen.)	Stadium: Rajko Mitić Stadium; Attendance: 39,789; Referee: Clément Turpin (France)

11 October 2025 2026 FIFA World Cup qualification	Serbia	0–1	Albania	Leskovac, Serbia
20:45		Report (FIFA); Report (UEFA)	Rey Manaj 45+1'	Stadium: Dubočica Stadium; Attendance: 4,320; Referee: István Kovács (Romania)

14 October 2025 2026 FIFA World Cup qualification	Andorra	1–3	Serbia	Encamp, Androrra
20:45	López 17'	Report (FIFA); Report (UEFA)	Garcia 19' (o.g.); Vlahović 54'; Mitrović 77' (pen.)	Stadium: Estadi de la FAF; Attendance: 987; Referee: Anastasios Papapetrou (Greece)

13 November 2025 2026 FIFA World Cup qualification	England	2–0	Serbia	London, England
20:45	Saka 28'; Eze 90'	Report (FIFA); Report (UEFA)		Stadium: Wembley Stadium; Attendance: 74,289; Referee: Ivan Kružliak (Slovakia)

16 November 2025 2026 FIFA World Cup qualification	Serbia	2–1	Latvia	Leskovac, Serbia
18:00	Katai 49'; Stanković 60'	Report (FIFA); Report (UEFA)	Gutkovskis 12'	Stadium: Dubočica Stadium; Attendance: 3,894; Referee: Ricardo de Burgos Bengoetxea (Spain)

=== Goalscorers during the competition ===
4 goals

- Aleksandar Mitrović

2 goal

- Dušan Vlahović

1 goal

- Aleksandar Katai
- Aleksandar Stanković
- Christian Garcia (Own Goal)

== 2026–27 UEFA Nations League ==
=== League A – Group 2 ===
Pos	Team	Pld	W	D	L	GF	GA	GD	Pts	Qualification or relegation	(Germany)	(Netherlands)	(Greece)	(Serbia)
1	Germany	6	3	2	1	11	3	+8	11 (Note: Tied on head-to-head points (5). Head-to-head goal difference: Germany +4, Netherlands +2, Greece −6.)	Advance to quarter-finals	—	5–0	0–1	2–0
2	Netherlands	6	3	2	1	14	10	+4	11	Advance to quarter-finals	1–1	—	7–0	2–1
3	Greece	6	3	2	1	6	10	−4	11		0–0	2–2	—	1–0
4	Serbia	6	0	0	6	4	12	−8	0	Qualification for relegation play-offs	1–3	1–2	1–2	—

Source: UEFA
Rules for classification: Tiebreakers

=== Results ===
24 September 2026 2026–27 UEFA Nations League	Serbia	1–2	Greece	Belgrade, Serbia
20:45 CET (UTC+02:00)	Živković 4'	Report (FIFA); Report (UEFA)	Tzolis 74'; Douvikas 90+5'	Stadium: Rajko Mitić Stadium; Attendance: 5,701; Referee: Glenn Nyberg (Sweden)

27 September 2026 2026–27 UEFA Nations League	Serbia	1–2	Netherlands	Belgrade, Serbia
18:00 CET (UTC+02:00)	Jović 49'	Report (FIFA); Report (UEFA)	Meerdink 30' (pen.), 69'	Stadium: Rajko Mitić Stadium; Attendance: 15,212; Referee: Szymon Marciniak (Poland)

1 October 2026 2026–27 UEFA Nations League	Germany	2–0	Serbia	Munich, Germany
20:45 CET (UTC+02:00)	Bischof 39'; Wirtz 61'	Report (FIFA); Report (UEFA)		Stadium: Allianz Arena; Attendance: 68,121; Referee: Espen Eskås (Norway)

4 October 2026 2026–27 UEFA Nations League	Netherlands	2–1	Serbia	Eindhoven, Netherlands
20:45 CET (UTC+02:00)	Koopmeiners 31'; Zirkzee 71'	Report (FIFA); Report (UEFA)	Cvetković 35'	Stadium: Philips Stadion; Attendance: 31,387; Referee: Donatas Rumšas (Lithuania)

13 November 2026 2026–27 UEFA Nations League	Serbia	1–3	Germany	Belgrade, Serbia
20:45 CET (UTC+01:00)	Babić 56'	Report (FIFA); Report (UEFA)	Babić 3' (o.g.); Wirtz 14'; Gruda 50'	Stadium: Rajko Mitić Stadium; Attendance: 2,962; Referee: Javier Alberola Rojas (Spain)

16 November 2026 2026–27 UEFA Nations League	Greece	1–0	Serbia	Volos, Greece
21:45 EET (UTC+02:00)	Masouras 69'	Report (FIFA); Report (UEFA)		Stadium: Panthessaliko Stadium; Attendance: 20,960; Referee: Michael Oliver (England)

=== Promotion/relegation play-offs ===
25/27 March 2027 2026–27 UEFA Nations League promotion/relegation play-offs	v

28/30 March 2027 2026–27 UEFA Nations League promotion/relegation play-offs	v

=== Goalscorers during the competition ===
1 goal

- Andrija Živković
- Luka Jović
- Mihajlo Cvetković
- Srđan Babić

== All matches summary ==
=== FIFA World Cup ===
Total score in FIFA World Cup matches
As of 2 December 2022

Matches	Won	Draw	Lost	GF	GA	GD	Win %	Draw %	Loss %	Pts
9	2	1	6	9	15	–6	22.22	11.11	66.66	7

Goal scorers

These players scored goals in FIFA World Cup matches:

3 goal

- Aleksandar Mitrović

1 goal

- Milan Jovanović
- Aleksandar Kolarov
- Marko Pantelić
- Sergej Milinković-Savić
- Strahinja Pavlović
- Dušan Vlahović

=== UEFA European Championship ===
Total score in UEFA European Championship matches
As of 25 June 2024

Matches	Won	Draw	Lost	GF	GA	GD	Win %	Draw %	Loss %	Pts
3	0	2	1	1	2	–1	0.00	66.67	33.33	2

Goal scorers

These players scored goals in UEFA European Championship matches:

1 goal

- Luka Jović

=== Major competitions qualifying matches ===
Total score in FIFA and UEFA competitions qualifying matches.
As of 16 November 2025

Matches	Won	Draw	Lost	GF	GA	GD	Win %	Draw %	Loss %	Pts
96	48	24	24	165	112	+53	50.00	25.00	25.00	165 (Note: In Euro 2016 qualifiers Serbia were deducted three points, after the match was abandoned at 0–0 because of fans riots.)

Goal scorers

These players scored goals in qualifying matches:

34 goals

- Aleksandar Mitrović

13 goals

- Nikola Žigić

12 goals

- Dušan Tadić

9 goals

- Dušan Vlahović

7 goals

- Milan Jovanović
- Zoran Tošić
- Branislav Ivanović
- Aleksandar Kolarov

5 goals

- Danko Lazović

4 goals

- Zdravko Kuzmanović
- Marko Pantelić

3 goals

- Boško Janković
- Filip Kostić
- Sergej Milinković-Savić
- Adem Ljajić
- Filip Đuričić

2 goals

- Mijat Gaćinović
- Luka Jović
- Miloš Krasić
- Nemanja Matić
- Nikola Milenković
- Nenad Milijaš
- Nemanja Radonjić
- Dejan Stanković

1 goal

- Srđan Babić
- Duško Tošić
- Miralem Sulejmani
- Stefan Šćepović
- Filip Đorđević
- Milan Smiljanić
- Neven Subotić
- Dušan Basta
- Darko Lazović
- Lazar Marković
- Luka Milivojević
- Ivan Obradović
- Strahinja Pavlović
- Aleksandar Prijović
- Miloš Veljković
- Aleksandar Katai
- Aleksandar Stanković
- Jón Rói Jacobsen (Own Goal)
- Stefan Ristovski (Own goal)
- Dorel Stoica (Own Goal)
- Attila Szalai (Own Goal)
- Sergei Ostapenko (Own Goal)
- Levon Hayrapetyan (Own Goal)
- Maxime Chanot (Own Goal)
- Christian Garcia (Own Goal)

=== UEFA Nations League ===
Total score in competitions matches.
As of 16 November 2026

Matches	Won	Draw	Lost	GF	GA	GD	Win %	Draw %	Loss %
32	11	10	11	43	35	+8	34.38	31.25	34.38

Goal scorers

These players scored goals in UEFA Nations League matches:

15 goals

- Aleksandar Mitrović

5 goals

- Luka Jović

3 goals

- Nemanja Radonjić
- Dušan Vlahović

2 goals

- Adem Ljajić
- Sergej Milinković-Savić
- Andrija Živković

1 goal

- Mihajlo Cvetković
- Dušan Tadić
- Aleksandar Prijović
- Saša Lukić
- Filip Mladenović
- Aleksa Terzić
- Lazar Samardžić
- Nemanja Maksimović
- Srđan Babić
- Nico Elvedi (Own Goal)
- Artūras Žulpa (Own Goal)

=== Friendly matches ===
Total score in friendly matches.
As of 4 June 2026

Matches	Won	Draw	Lost	GF	GA	GD	Win %	Draw %	Loss %
84	36	17	31	111	91	+20	42.86	20.24	36.90

Goal scorers

These players scored goals in friendly matches:

12 goals

- Aleksandar Mitrović

10 goals

- Dušan Tadić

6 goals

- Branislav Ivanović
- Danko Lazović

5 goals

- Marko Pantelić

4 goals

- Adem Ljajić
- Luka Jović
- Zoran Tošić

3 goals

- Filip Đorđević
- Milan Jovanović
- Aleksandar Kolarov
- Strahinja Pavlović
- Sergej Milinković-Savić
- Dušan Vlahović
- Nikola Žigić

2 goals

- Filip Đuričić
- Boško Janković
- Dejan Joveljić
- Zdravko Kuzmanović
- Lazar Marković
- Nenad Milijaš
- Savo Milošević
- Dragan Mrđa
- Radosav Petrović

1 goal

- Dušan Basta
- Strahinja Eraković
- Nemanja Gudelj
- Luka Ilić
- Miloš Jojić
- Miloš Krasić
- Saša Lukić
- Nikola Milenković
- Nemanja Milunović
- Petar Stanić
- Dejan Stanković
- Veljko Simić
- Petar Škuletić
- Neven Subotić
- Nemanja Tomić
- Aleksandar Trišović
- Veseljko Trivunović
- Nemanja Vidić
- Boualem Khoukhi (Own Goal)
- James McCarthy (Own Goal)
- Zsolt Nagy (Own Goal)

== Head to head records ==
As of 16 November 2026

Opponent	Pld	W	D	L	GF	GA	GD	Competitive matches (Note: Legend: "W" – FIFA World Cup match; "E" – UEFA European Championship match; "N" – UEFA Nations League Finals match; "Q" – qualifying match or UEFA Nations League group stage match; In each final tournament of the World Cup, the European Championship and the Nations League (shown in bold), Serbia has played one match against the respective opponent, while in each qualifying tournament and each Nations League group stage, it has played two matches against the respective opponent. Friendly matches and minor tournaments are counted in the table but are not shown in this column.)
Albania	4	1	1	2 (Note: The Serbia v Albania match was abandoned with the score at 0–0 in the 42nd minute after "various incidents", which resulted in the Albania players refusing to return to the field. UEFA ruled that not only Albania had forfeited the match and awarded a 3–0 win to Serbia, but also deducted three points from Serbia for their involvement in the events. Serbia also had to play their next two home qualifying games behind closed doors, and both the Serbian and Albanian FAs were fined €100,000. The decision was appealed by both Serbia and Albania, but the decision was upheld by UEFA. Both associations then filed further appeals to the Court of Arbitration for Sport, and on 10 July 2015, the Court of Arbitration for Sport rejected the appeal filed by the Serbian FA, and upheld in part the appeal filed by the Albanian FA, meaning the match is deemed to have been forfeited by Serbia with 0–3 and they are still deducted three points.)	2	4	–2	2016 EQ; 2026 WQ
Algeria	1	1	0	0	3	0	+3	
Andorra	2	2	0	0	6	1	+5	2026 WQ
Armenia	5	3	2	0	8	1	+7	2008 EQ; 2016 EQ
Australia	2	0	1	1	1	2	–1	2010 W
Austria	7	4	1	2	13	9	+4	2010 WQ; 2018 WQ; 2024–25 NQ
Azerbaijan	5	5	0	0	16	4	+12	2008 EQ; 2022 WQ
Bahrain	1	1	0	0	5	1	+4	
Belgium	5	1	0	4	4	9	–5	2008 EQ; 2014 WQ
Bolivia	1	1	0	0	5	1	+4	
Brazil	3	0	0	3	0	5	–5	2018 W 2022 W
Bulgaria	4	2	2	0	10	4	+6	2024 EQ
Cameroon	2	1	1	0	7	6	+1	2022 W
Cape Verde	1	0	0	1	0	3	–3	
Chile	2	1	0	1	3	2	+1	
China	1	1	0	0	2	0	+2	
Colombia	1	0	0	1	0	1	–1	
Costa Rica	1	1	0	0	1	0	+1	2018 W
Croatia	2	0	1	1	1	3	–2	2014 WQ
Cyprus	5	4	1	0	8	2	+6	
Czech Republic	2	1	0	1	4	5	–1	
Denmark	6	0	2	4	1	10	–9	2016 EQ; 2024 E 2024–25 NQ
Dominican Republic	1	0	1	0	0	0	0	
England	3	0	0	3	0	8	–8	2024 E 2026 WQ
Estonia	3	1	1	1	3	4	–1	2012 EQ
Faroe Islands	4	4	0	0	10	1	+9	2010 WQ; 2012 EQ
Finland	2	1	1	0	2	0	+2	2008 EQ
France	5	0	2	3	4	8	–4	2010 WQ
Georgia	2	2	0	0	4	1	+3	2018 WQ
Germany	5	1	1	3	4	8	–4	2010 W 2025–26 NQ; 2026–27 NQ
Ghana	1	0	0	1	0	1	–1	2010 W
Greece	4	1	0	3	3	4	–1	2025–26 NQ; 2026–27 NQ
Honduras	1	0	0	1	0	2	–2	
Hungary	5	1	1	3	4	6	–2	2020–21 NQ; 2024 EQ
Israel	2	2	0	0	5	1	+4	
Italy	2	0	1	1 (Note: The Italy v Serbia match was abandoned after six minutes due to rioting by Serbian fans. The UEFA Control and Disciplinary Body awarded the match as a 3–0 forfeit win to Italy.)	1	4	–3	2012 EQ
Jamaica	2	1	1	0	3	2	+1	
Japan	3	2	0	1	5	1	+4	
Jordan	1	1	0	0	3	2	+1	
Kazakhstan	2	1	0	1	2	2	0	2008 EQ
Latvia	2	2	0	0	3	1	+2	2026 WQ
Lithuania	8	7	0	1	20	6	+14	2010 WQ; 2018–19 NQ; 2020 EQ; 2024 EQ
Luxembourg	4	4	0	0	11	4	+7	2020 EQ; 2022 WQ
Morocco	1	0	0	1	1	2	–1	
Moldova	2	2	0	0	6	0	+6	2018 WQ
Mexico	2	0	0	2	1	7	–6	
Montenegro	4	4	0	0	9	2	+7	2018–19 NQ; 2024 EQ
Netherlands	2	0	0	2	2	4	–1	2025–26 NQ
Nigeria	1	1	0	0	2	0	+2	
North Macedonia	3	1	1	1	6	3	+3	2014 WQ
Northern Ireland	3	3	0	0	4	1	+3	2012 EQ
Norway	4	2	1	1	5	3	+2	2020 EQ; 2022–23 NQ
New Zealand	1	0	0	1	0	1	–1	
Panama	2	0	2	0	1	1	0	
Paraguay	1	1	0	0	1	0	+1	
Poland	5	0	3	2	3	5	–2	2008 EQ
Portugal	8	1	4	3	11	14	–3	2008 EQ; 2016 EQ; 2020 EQ; 2022 WQ
Qatar	3	2	0	1	8	3	+5	
Republic of Ireland	7	3	4	0	10	7	+3	2018 WQ; 2022 WQ
Romania	4	2	2	0	10	4	+6	2010 WQ; 2018–19 NQ
Russia	7	1	2	4	9	12	–3	2020–21 NQ
Saudi Arabia	1	1	0	0	2	1	+1	
Scotland	3	1	2	0	3	1	+2	2014 WQ; 2020 EQ
Slovenia	5	1	3	1	8	6	+2	2012 EQ; 2022–23 NQ; 2024 E
South Africa	1	1	0	0	3	1	+2	
South Korea	3	1	1	1	3	3	0	
Spain	4	0	1	3	0	8	–8	2024–25 NQ
Sweden	5	4	0	1	11	3	+8	2022–23 NQ
Switzerland	4	1	1	2	6	6	0	2018 W 2022 W 2024–25 NQ
Turkey	2	0	2	0	2	2	0	2020–21 NQ
Ukraine	5	0	1	4	2	12	–10	2020 EQ
United States	2	1	1	0	2	1	+1	
Wales	4	2	2	0	11	3	+8	2014 WQ; 2018 WQ
Total (73)	224	97	54	73	329	255	+74	

== See also ==
- Yugoslavia national football team results (1920–1941)
- Yugoslavia national football team results (1946–1969)
- Yugoslavia national football team results (1970–1992)
- Serbia and Montenegro national football team results (1994–2006)
- Serbia national football team results (1945)
- Serbia national football team results (2006–2009)
- Serbia national football team results (2010–2019)
- Serbia national football team results (2020–2029)
