= Serbia national football team results (2006–2009) =

This article lists the results for the Serbia national football team from 2006 to 2009. Serbia played the non-FIFA Basque Country team on 27 December 2006, and this did not contribute to ranking points or individual cap totals.

== List of matches ==
=== 2006 ===
| 18 August International friendly | Czech Republic | 1–3 | Serbia | Uherské Hradiště, Czech Republic |
| | Štajner 3' | Report | Lazović 41'; Pantelić 54'; Trišović 72' | Stadium: Městský fotbalový stadion Miroslava Valenty; Attendance: 8,047; Referee: Dietmar Drabek (Austria) |

| 2 September UEFA Euro 2008 qualifying | Serbia | 1–0 | Azerbaijan | Belgrade, Serbia |
| 20:15 | Duljaj (yellow card) 30'; Žigić 72' | Report | Bakhshiyev (yellow card) 20'; Abbasov (yellow card) 66'; Andrezinho (yellow card) 76' | Stadium: Stadion Crvena Zvezda; Attendance: 0 (Note: Serbia played their home match against Azerbaijan behind closed doors as they were punished for a previous crowd disturbance during their last match of 2006 FIFA World Cup qualification.); Referee: Knut Kircher (Germany) |

| 6 September UEFA Euro 2008 qualifying | Poland | 1–1 | Serbia | Warsaw, Poland |
| 20:30 | Golański (yellow card) 19'; Matusiak 30'; Błaszczykowski (yellow card) 80'; Kowalewski (yellow card) 90' | Report | Marković (yellow card) 43'; Stanković (yellow card) 55'; Stepanov (yellow card) 55'; Lazović 71'; Krstajić (yellow card) 86' | Stadium: Stadion Wojska Polskiego; Attendance: 5,000; Referee: Graham Poll (England) |

| 7 October UEFA Euro 2008 qualifying | Serbia | 1–0 | Belgium | Belgrade, Serbia |
| 20:15 | Žigić 54'; Koroman (yellow card) 58'; Marković (yellow card) 69' | Report | Kompany (yellow card) 81'; Simons (yellow card) 86' | Stadium: Stadion Crvena Zvezda; Attendance: 35,000; Referee: Domenico Messina (Italy) |

| 11 October UEFA Euro 2008 qualifying | Serbia | 3–0 | Armenia | Belgrade, Serbia |
| 20:45 CEST (UTC+02:00) | Pantelić (penalty missed) 14'; Stanković (yellow card) 47' (goal) 54' (pen.); Lazović 62'; Žigić 90' | Report | Arzumanyan (yellow card) 13'; Nazaryan (yellow card) 50' (yellow-red card) 76'; Kasparov (yellow card) 53' | Stadium: Stadion Crvena Zvezda; Attendance: 20,000; Referee: Georgios Kasnaferis (Greece) |

| 15 November International friendly | Serbia | 1–1 | Norway | Belgrade, Serbia |
| | Vidić 6' | Report | Carew 21' | Stadium: Stadion Crvena Zvezda; Attendance: 12,000; Referee: Georgios Kasnaferis (Greece) |

| 27 December Friedly unofficial match | Basque Country | 4–0 | Serbia | Bilbao, Spain |
| 20:30 CET | Yeste 33'; Urzaiz 41'; Sarriegui 60'; Uranga 87' | Report | | Stadium: San Mamés; Referee: Carlos Delgado Ferreiro |

=== 2007 ===
| 24 March UEFA Euro 2008 qualifying | Kazakhstan | 2–1 | Serbia | Almaty, Kazakhstan |
| 19:00 | Irismetov (yellow card) 7'; Baltiyev (yellow card) 42'; Ashirbekov 47'; Loriya (yellow card) 59'; Zhumaskaliyev 61' | Report | Krasić (yellow card) 37'; Vidić (yellow card) 64'; Žigić 68' (red card) 90+4' | Stadium: Central Stadium; Attendance: 15,000; Referee: Vladimir Hriňák (Slovakia) |

| 28 March UEFA Euro 2008 qualifying | Serbia | 1–1 | Portugal | Belgrade, Serbia |
| 20:15 | Stanković (yellow card) 7'; Pantelić (yellow card) 35'; Janković 37' (yellow card) 40'; Dragutinović (yellow card) 62' | Report | Tiago 5'; Ronaldo (yellow card) 36'; Ferreira (yellow card) 50'; Carvalho (yellow card) 60' | Stadium: Stadion Crvena Zvezda; Attendance: 55,000; Referee: Bertrand Layec (France) |

| 2 June UEFA Euro 2008 qualifying | Finland | 0–2 | Serbia | Helsinki, Finland |
| 19:15 | Hyypiä (yellow card) 77' | Report | Janković 3'; Kovačević (yellow card) 27'; Stanković (yellow card) 77'; Jovanović 86' | Stadium: Olympic Stadium; Attendance: 33,615; Referee: Manuel Mejuto González (Spain) |

| 22 August UEFA Euro 2008 qualifying | Belgium | 3–2 | Serbia | Brussels, Belgium |
| 20:45 | Dembélé 10', 88'; Mirallas 30'; Goor (yellow card) 32' | Report | Kuzmanović 73', 90+1'; Krstajić (yellow card) 78'; Vidić (yellow card) 90+4' | Stadium: King Baudouin Stadium; Attendance: 19,202; Referee: Terje Hauge (Norway) |

| 8 September UEFA Euro 2008 qualifying | Serbia | 0–0 | Finland | Belgrade, Serbia |
| 20:15 | Z. Tošić (yellow card) 77' | Report | Hyypiä (yellow card) 19'; Tainio (yellow card) 71' | Stadium: Stadion Crvena Zvezda; Attendance: 15,000; Referee: Eric Braamhaar (Netherlands) |

| 12 September UEFA Euro 2008 qualifying | Portugal | 1–1 | Serbia | Lisbon, Portugal |
| 21:00 | Simão 11'; Petit (yellow card) 86' | Report | Stojković (yellow card) 36'; Dragutinović (yellow card) 51' (yellow-red card) 90+2'; Vidić (yellow card) 59'; Ivanović 88' | Stadium: Estádio José Alvalade; Attendance: 47,000; Referee: Markus Merk (Germany) |

| 13 October UEFA Euro 2008 qualifying | Armenia | 0–0 | Serbia | Yerevan, Armenia |
| 20:00 | Mkhitaryan (yellow card) 23'; Arakelyan (yellow card) 37' | Report | Stanković (yellow card) 51'; Rukavina (yellow card) 60'; Stepanov (yellow card) 90' | Stadium: Vazgen Sargsyan Republican Stadium; Attendance: 10,000; Referee: Stefan Johannesson (Sweden) |

| 17 October UEFA Euro 2008 qualifying | Azerbaijan | 1–6 | Serbia | Baku, Azerbaijan |
| 21:00 | Aliyev 26'; Imamaliev (yellow card) 32'; Bakhshiyev (yellow card) 69' | Report | D. Tošić 4'; Žigić 22', 42'; Kuzmanović (yellow card) 37'; Janković 41'; Smiljanić 75'; Lazović 84' | Stadium: Tofiq Bahramov Republican Stadium; Attendance: 9,000; Referee: Thomas Einwaller (Austria) |

| 21 November UEFA Euro 2008 qualifying | Serbia | 2–2 | Poland | Belgrade, Serbia |
| 20:45 | Rukavina (yellow card) 30'; Žigić 68' (yellow card) 90'; Lazović 70' (yellow card) 88' | Report | Murawski 28'; Wawrzyniak (yellow card) 42'; Zahorski (yellow card) 43'; Matusiak 46'; Bąk (yellow card) 74' | Stadium: Stadion Crvena Zvezda; Attendance: 3,000; Referee: Massimo Busacca (Switzerland) |

| 24 November UEFA Euro 2008 qualifying | Serbia | 1–0 | Kazakhstan | Belgrade, Serbia |
| 20:45 | Krasić (yellow card) 19'; Kačar (yellow card) 43'; Ostapenko 79' (o.g.); Avramov (yellow card) 90+3' | Report | Byakov (yellow card) 68'; Baltiyev (yellow card) 86'; Zhalmagambetov (yellow card) 90+3' | Stadium: Partizan Stadium; Attendance: 300; Referee: Kyros Vassaras (Greece) |

=== 2008 ===
| 6 February International friendly | Macedonia | 1–1 | Serbia | Skopje, Macedonia |
| 17:00 | Noveski 58' | Report | Lazović 43' | Stadium: Městský fotbalový stadion Miroslava Valenty; Attendance: 10,000; Referee: Tsvetan Georgiev (Bulgaria) |

| 26 March International friendly | Ukraine | 2–0 | Serbia | Odesa, Ukraine |
| 18:00 | Shevchenko 54'; Nazarenko 57' | Report | | Stadium: Chernomorets Stadium; Attendance: 8,000; Referee: Romāns Lajuks (Latvia) |

| 24 May International friendly | Republic of Ireland | 1–1 | Serbia | Dublin, Republic of Ireland |
| 20:45 | Keogh 90+1' | Report | Pantelić 75' | Stadium: Croke Park; Attendance: 42,500; Referee: Simon Lee Evans (Wales) |

| 28 May International friendly | Russia | 2–1 | Serbia | Burghausen, Germany |
| 19:00 | Pogrebnyak 12'; Pavlyuchenko 48' | Report | Pantelić 41' | Stadium: Wacker-Arena; Attendance: 4,030; Referee: Wolfgang Stark (Germany) |

| 31 May International friendly | Germany | 2–1 | Serbia | Gelsenkirchen, Germany |
| 17:30 | Neuville 74'; Ballack 82' | Report | Janković 18' | Stadium: Veltins-Arena; Attendance: 53,951; Referee: Fredy Fautrel (France) |

| 6 September 2010 FIFA World Cup qualification | Serbia | 2–0 | Faroe Islands | Belgrade, Serbia |
| 20:15 | Jacobsen 30' (o.g.); Žigić 88' | Report | | Stadium: Stadion Crvena Zvezda; Attendance: 9,615; Referee: Aleksei Nikolaev (Russia) |

| 10 September 2010 FIFA World Cup qualification | France | 2–1 | Serbia | Saint-Denis France |
| 21:00 | Henry 53'; Anelka 63' | Report | Ivanović 75' | Stadium: Stade de France; Attendance: 53,027; Referee: Olegário Benquerença (Portugal) |

| 11 October 2010 FIFA World Cup qualification | Serbia | 3–0 | Lithuania | Belgrade, Serbia |
| 20:15 | Ivanović 6'; Krasić 34'; Žigić 82' | Report | | Stadium: Stadion Crvena Zvezda; Attendance: 22,000; Referee: Manuel Mejuto González (Spain) |

| 15 October 2010 FIFA World Cup qualification | Austria | 1–3 | Serbia | Vienna, Austria |
| 20:30 | Janko 80' | Report | Krasić 14'; Jovanović 18'; Obradović 24' | Stadium: Ernst Happel Stadion; Attendance: 47,998; Referee: Mike Riley (England) |

| 19 November International friendly | Serbia | 6–1 | Bulgaria | Belgrade, Serbia |
| 17:35 | Jovanović 9', 25'; Milošević 27', 33'; Milijaš 56'; Lazović 67' | Report | Georgiev 20' | Stadium: Partizan Stadium; Attendance: 7,000; Referee: Peter Sippel (Germany) |

| 14 December International friendly | Poland | 1–0 | Serbia | Antalya, Turkey |
| 15:00 | Boguski 53' | Report | | Stadium: Mardan Sports Complex; Attendance: 100; Referee: Selçuk Dereli (Turkey) |

=== 2009 ===
| 10 February International friendly | Cyprus | 0–2 | Serbia | Nicosia, Cyprus |
| 18:00 | | Report | Jovanović 25'; Lazović 42' | Stadium: GSP Stadium; Attendance: 250; Referee: Anastassios Kakos (Greece) |

| 11 February International friendly | Ukraine | 1–0 | Serbia | Nicosia, Cyprus |
| 18:00 | Nazarenko 16' | Report | | Stadium: GSP Stadium; Attendance: 200; Referee: Leontios Trattou (Cyprus) |

| 28 March 2010 FIFA World Cup qualification | Romania | 2–3 | Serbia | Constanţa, Romania |
| 19:15 | Marica 55'; Stoica 74' | Report | Jovanović 19'; Stoica 44' (o.g.); Ivanović 55' | Stadium: Stadionul Farul; Attendance: 15,000; Referee: Matteo Trefoloni (Italy) |

| 1 April International friendly | Serbia | 2–0 | Sweden | Belgrade, Serbia |
| 21:00 | Žigić 1'; Janković 82' | Report | | Stadium: Partizan Stadium; Attendance: 17,890; Referee: Antonio Rubinos Pérez (Spain) |

| 6 June 2010 FIFA World Cup qualification | Serbia | 1–0 | Austria | Belgrade, Serbia |
| 20:30 | Milijaš 7' (pen.) | Report | | Stadium: Stadion Crvena Zvezda; Attendance: 52,000; Referee: Pieter Vink (Netherlands) |

| 10 June 2010 FIFA World Cup qualification | Faroe Islands | 0–2 | Serbia | Tórshavn, Faroe Islands |
| 19:15 | | Report | Jovanović 44'; Subotić 62' | Stadium: Tórsvøllur; Attendance: 2,896; Referee: Meir Levi (Israel) |

| 12 August International friendly | South Africa | 1–3 | Serbia | Pretoria, South Africa |
| 19:00 | Mphela 90' | Report | Tošić 56', 77'; Lazović 68' | Stadium: Super Stadium; Attendance: 10,000; Referee: Eddy Maillet (Seychelles) |

| 9 September 2010 FIFA World Cup qualification | Serbia | 1–1 | France | Belgrade, Serbia |
| 21:00 | Milijaš 13' (pen.) | Report | Henry 31' | Stadium: Stadion Crvena Zvezda; Attendance: 49,456; Referee: Roberto Rosetti (Italy) |

| 10 October 2010 FIFA World Cup qualification | Serbia | 5–0 | Romania | Belgrade, Serbia |
| 20:30 | Žigić 37'; Pantelić 50'; Kuzmanović 78'; Jovanović 87', 90+3' | Report | | Stadium: Stadion Crvena Zvezda; Attendance: 39,839; Referee: Costas Kapitanis (Cyprus) |

| 14 October 2010 FIFA World Cup qualification | Lithuania | 2–1 | Serbia | Kaunas, Lithuania |
| 20:30 | Kalonas 19' (pen.); Stankevičius 69' (pen.) | Report | Tošić 60' | Stadium: Sūduva Stadium; Attendance: 1,500; Referee: Anton Guenov (Bulgaria) |

| 14 November International friendly | Northern Ireland | 0–1 | Serbia | Belfast, Northern Ireland |
| 18:30 | | Report | Lazović 57' | Stadium: Windsor Park; Attendance: 13,500; Referee: Anastassios Kakos (Luxembourg) |

| 18 November International friendly | South Korea | 0–1 | Serbia | London, England |
| 15:30 | | Report | Žigić 7' | Stadium: Craven Cottage; Attendance: 8,000; Referee: Stuart Attwell (England) |

== Head-to-head records ==
Serbia national football team head-to-head records (2006–2009)
| Opponent | Pld | W | D | L | GF | GA | GD | Pts | Confederation |
|---|---|---|---|---|---|---|---|---|---|
| Armenia | 2 | 1 | 1 | 0 | 3 | 0 | +3 | 4 | UEFA |
| Austria | 2 | 2 | 0 | 0 | 4 | 1 | +3 | 6 | UEFA |
| Azerbaijan | 2 | 2 | 0 | 0 | 7 | 1 | +6 | 6 | UEFA |
| Belgium | 2 | 1 | 0 | 1 | 3 | 3 | 0 | 3 | UEFA |
| Bulgaria | 1 | 1 | 0 | 0 | 6 | 1 | +5 | 3 | UEFA |
| Cyprus | 1 | 1 | 0 | 0 | 2 | 0 | +2 | 3 | UEFA |
| Czech Republic | 1 | 1 | 0 | 0 | 3 | 1 | +2 | 3 | UEFA |
| Faroe Islands | 2 | 2 | 0 | 0 | 4 | 0 | +4 | 6 | UEFA |
| Finland | 2 | 1 | 1 | 0 | 2 | 0 | +2 | 4 | UEFA |
| France | 2 | 0 | 1 | 1 | 2 | 3 | –1 | 1 | UEFA |
| Germany | 1 | 0 | 0 | 1 | 1 | 2 | –1 | 0 | UEFA |
| Kazakhstan | 2 | 1 | 0 | 1 | 2 | 2 | 0 | 3 | UEFA |
| Lithuania | 2 | 1 | 0 | 1 | 4 | 2 | +2 | 3 | UEFA |
| North Macedonia | 1 | 0 | 1 | 0 | 1 | 1 | 0 | 1 | UEFA |
| Northern Ireland | 1 | 1 | 0 | 0 | 1 | 0 | +1 | 3 | UEFA |
| Norway | 1 | 0 | 1 | 0 | 1 | 1 | 0 | 1 | UEFA |
| Poland | 3 | 0 | 2 | 1 | 3 | 4 | –1 | 2 | UEFA |
| Portugal | 2 | 0 | 2 | 0 | 2 | 2 | 0 | 2 | UEFA |
| Republic of Ireland | 1 | 0 | 1 | 0 | 1 | 1 | 0 | 1 | UEFA |
| Romania | 2 | 2 | 0 | 0 | 8 | 2 | +6 | 6 | UEFA |
| Russia | 1 | 0 | 0 | 1 | 1 | 2 | –1 | 0 | UEFA |
| South Africa | 1 | 1 | 0 | 0 | 3 | 1 | +2 | 3 | CAF |
| South Korea | 1 | 1 | 0 | 0 | 1 | 0 | +1 | 3 | AFC |
| Sweden | 1 | 1 | 0 | 0 | 2 | 0 | +2 | 3 | UEFA |
| Ukraine | 2 | 0 | 0 | 2 | 0 | 3 | –3 | 0 | UEFA |
| Total | 38 | 20 | 10 | 8 | 67 | 33 | +34 | 70 | |

== See also ==
- Serbia national football team results
- Serbia national football team results (2010–2019)
- Serbia national football team results (2020–2029)
