= Serbia national football team results (unofficial matches) =

This article lists the results for the Serbia national football team in 1945.

The team represented the Federal State of Serbia in a tournament organised by the Football Association of Yugoslavia. As a non-FIFA member nation these matches are not considered official.

== 1945 ==
3 September 1945 1945 Yugoslav Football Tournament	FS Serbia	2–1	FS Montenegro	Belgrade, Yugoslavia
14:00	Perlić; Tomašević		Latković	Stadium: 20th October Stadium; Attendance: 5,000; Referee: Lado Macoratti (PR Slovenia)

8 September 1945 1945 Yugoslav Football Tournament	FS Serbia	3–1	FS Croatia	Belgrade, Yugoslavia
16:00	Mitić; Jezerkić 71'; Mitić 90'		Reiss	Stadium: 20th October Stadium; Attendance: 12,000

9 September 1945 1945 Yugoslav Football Tournament	FS Serbia	1–0	Yugoslav People's Army	Belgrade, Yugoslavia
16:00	Jezerkić 5'			Stadium: 20th October Stadium; Attendance: 15,000

== See also ==
- Serbia and Montenegro national football team results (1994–2006)
- Serbia national football team results
- Serbia national football team results (2006–09)
- Serbia national football team results (2010–19)
- Serbia national football team results (2020–29)
