= 2010 FIFA World Cup qualification – UEFA Group 7 =

Football tournament qualifying stage

The 2010 FIFA World Cup qualification UEFA Group 7 was a UEFA qualifying group for the 2010 FIFA World Cup. The group comprised France, Romania, Serbia, Lithuania, Austria and Faroe Islands.

The group was won by Serbia, who qualified for the 2010 FIFA World Cup. The runners-up France entered the UEFA play-off stage.

== Standings ==
Pos	Team	Pld	W	D	L	GF	GA	GD	Pts	Qualification	(Serbia)	(France)	(Austria)	(Lithuania)	(Romania)	(Faroe Islands)
1	Serbia	10	7	1	2	22	8	+14	22	Qualification to 2010 FIFA World Cup	—	1–1	1–0	3–0	5–0	2–0
2	France	10	6	3	1	18	9	+9	21	Advance to second round	2–1	—	3–1	1–0	1–1	5–0
3	Austria	10	4	2	4	14	15	−1	14		1–3	3–1	—	2–1	2–1	3–1
4	Lithuania	10	4	0	6	10	11	−1	12		2–1	0–1	2–0	—	0–1	1–0
5	Romania	10	3	3	4	12	18	−6	12		2–3	2–2	1–1	0–3	—	3–1
6	Faroe Islands	10	1	1	8	5	20	−15	4		0–2	0–1	1–1	2–1	0–1	—

== Matches ==
The representatives of the six federations met in Vienna, Austria on 8 December 2007 to decide on a fixture calendar. The August 2009 date in the international match calendar was moved forward by one week, from 19 August to 12 August, at the FIFA Executive Committee meeting in May 2008.

6 September 2008
21:00 UTC+3

Romania	0–3	Lithuania
	Report	Stankevičius 31'; Mikoliūnas 69'; Kalonas 86'

Dr. C. Rădulescu Stadium, Cluj-Napoca
Attendance: 14,000
Referee: Alan Kelly (Republic of Ireland)
6 September 2008
20:15 UTC+2

Serbia	2–0	Faroe Islands
J. Jacobsen 30' (o.g.); Žigić 88'	Report

Stadion Crvena Zvezda, Belgrade
Attendance: 9,615
Referee: Alexey Nikolaev (Russia)
6 September 2008
20:45 UTC+2

Austria	3–1	France
Janko 8'; Aufhauser 41'; Ivanschitz 72' (pen.)	Report	Govou 61'

Ernst Happel Stadion, Vienna
Attendance: 48,000
Referee: Claus Bo Larsen (Denmark)

10 September 2008
17:30 UTC+1

Faroe Islands	0–1	Romania
	Report	Cociş 59'

Tórsvøllur, Tórshavn
Attendance: 805
Referee: Marijo Strahonja (Croatia)
10 September 2008
20:30 UTC+3

Lithuania	2–0	Austria
Danilevičius 52', 58'	Report

Sūduva Stadium, Marijampolė
Attendance: 4,500
Referee: Paolo Tagliavento (Italy)
10 September 2008
21:00 UTC+2

France	2–1	Serbia
Henry 53'; Anelka 63'	Report	Ivanović 75'

Stade de France, Saint-Denis
Attendance: 53,027
Referee: Olegário Benquerença (Portugal)

11 October 2008
16:00 UTC+1

Faroe Islands	1–1	Austria
Løkin 47'	Report	Stranzl 49'

Tórsvøllur, Tórshavn
Attendance: 1,800
Referee: Darko Ceferin (Slovenia)
11 October 2008
20:15 UTC+2

Serbia	3–0	Lithuania
Ivanović 6'; Krasić 34'; Žigić 82'	Report

Stadion Crvena Zvezda, Belgrade
Attendance: 22,000
Referee: Manuel Mejuto González (Spain)
11 October 2008
21:40 UTC+3

Romania	2–2	France
F. Petre 6'; Goian 17'	Report	Ribéry 36'; Gourcuff 69'

Stadionul Farul, Constanţa
Attendance: 12,800
Referee: Frank De Bleeckere (Belgium)

15 October 2008
19:00 UTC+3

Lithuania	1–0	Faroe Islands
Danilevičius 20'	Report

S. Darius and S. Girėnas Stadium, Kaunas
Attendance: 5,000
Referee: Costas Kapitanis (Cyprus)
15 October 2008
20:30 UTC+2

Austria	1–3	Serbia
Janko 80'	Report	Krasić 15'; Jovanović 18'; Obradović 24'

Ernst Happel Stadion, Vienna
Attendance: 47,998
Referee: Mike Riley (England)

28 March 2009
19:45 UTC+2

Romania	2–3	Serbia
Marica 50'; Stoica 74'	Report	Jovanović 18'; Stoica 44' (o.g.); Ivanović 59'

Stadionul Farul, Constanţa
Attendance: 15,000
Referee: Matteo Trefoloni (Italy)
28 March 2009
21:45 UTC+2

Lithuania	0–1	France
	Report	Ribéry 67'

S. Darius and S. Girėnas Stadium, Kaunas
Attendance: 8,700
Referee: Eric Braamhaar (Netherlands)

1 April 2009
20:30 UTC+2

Austria	2–1	Romania
Hoffer 26', 44'	Report	Tănase 24'

Hypo-Arena, Klagenfurt
Attendance: 23,000
Referee: Craig Thomson (Scotland)
1 April 2009
21:00 UTC+2

France	1–0	Lithuania
Ribéry 75'	Report

Stade de France, Saint-Denis
Attendance: 79,543
Referee: Howard Webb (England)

6 June 2009
21:00 UTC+3

Lithuania	0–1	Romania
	Report	Marica 38'

Sūduva Stadium, Marijampolė
Attendance: 5,850
Referee: Jonas Eriksson (Sweden)
6 June 2009
20:30 UTC+2

Serbia	1–0	Austria
Milijaš 7' (pen.)	Report

Stadion Crvena Zvezda, Belgrade
Attendance: 41,000
Referee: Pieter Vink (Netherlands)

10 June 2009
19:15 UTC+1

Faroe Islands	0–2	Serbia
	Report	Jovanović 44'; Subotić 69'

Tórsvøllur, Tórshavn
Attendance: 2,896
Referee: Meir Levi (Israel)

12 August 2009
17:00 UTC+1

Faroe Islands	0–1	France
	Report	Gignac 41'

Tórsvøllur, Tórshavn
Attendance: 2,974
Referee: Michael Koukoulakis (Greece)

5 September 2009
20:30 UTC+2

Austria	3–1	Faroe Islands
Maierhofer 1'; Janko 15', 58' (pen.)	Report	A. Olsen 82'

UPC-Arena, Graz
Attendance: 12,300
Referee: Marco Borg (Malta)
5 September 2009
21:00 UTC+2

France	1–1	Romania
Henry 48'	Report	Escudé 55' (o.g.)

Stade de France, Saint-Denis
Attendance: 78,209
Referee: Ivan Bebek (Croatia)

9 September 2009
17:15 UTC+1

Faroe Islands	2–1	Lithuania
S. Olsen 13'; A. Hansen 34'	Report	Danilevičius 22' (pen.)

Svangaskarð, Toftir
Attendance: 1,942
Referee: István Vad (Hungary)
9 September 2009
20:45 UTC+3

Romania	1–1	Austria
Bucur 54'	Report	Schiemer 83'

Stadionul Steaua, Bucharest
Attendance: 7,505
Referee: Martin Atkinson (England)
9 September 2009
21:00 UTC+2

Serbia	1–1	France
Milijaš 12' (pen.)	Report	Henry 36'

Stadion Crvena Zvezda, Belgrade
Attendance: 49,456
Referee: Roberto Rosetti (Italy)

10 October 2009
20:30 UTC+2

Austria	2–1	Lithuania
Janko 16'; Wallner 80' (pen.)	Report	Stankevičius 66'

Tivoli Neu, Innsbruck
Attendance: 14,200
Referee: Serge Gumienny (Belgium)
10 October 2009
20:30 UTC+2

Serbia	5–0	Romania
Žigić 37'; Pantelić 50'; Kuzmanović 78'; Jovanović 87', 90+3'	Report

Stadion Crvena Zvezda, Belgrade
Attendance: 39,839
Referee: Costas Kapitanis (Cyprus)
10 October 2009
21:00 UTC+2

France	5–0	Faroe Islands
Gignac 34', 38'; Gallas 52'; Anelka 86'; Benzema 88'	Report

Stade du Roudourou, Guingamp
Attendance: 16,755
Referee: Robert Małek (Poland)

14 October 2009
21:00 UTC+3

Lithuania	2–1	Serbia
Kalonas 20' (pen.); Stankevičius 68' (pen.)	Report	Tošić 60'

Sūduva Stadium, Marijampolė
Attendance: 2,000
Referee: Anton Guenov (Bulgaria)
14 October 2009
21:00 UTC+3

Romania	3–1	Faroe Islands
Apostol 16'; Bucur 65'; Mazilu 87'	Report	á Bø 83'

Stadionul Ceahlăul, Piatra Neamţ
Attendance: 13,000
Referee: Alexander Gvardis (Russia)
14 October 2009
21:00 UTC+2

France	3–1	Austria
Benzema 18'; Henry 26' (pen.); Gignac 66'	Report	Janko 49'

Stade de France, Saint-Denis
Attendance: 78,099
Referee: Pedro Proença (Portugal)

== Goalscorers ==
There were 81 goals scored in 30 matches, for an average of 2.7 goals per match.

6 goals

- (Austria) Marc Janko

5 goals

- (Serbia) Milan Jovanović

4 goals

- (France) André-Pierre Gignac
- (France) Thierry Henry
- (Lithuania) Tomas Danilevičius

3 goals

- (France) Franck Ribéry
- (Lithuania) Marius Stankevičius
- (Serbia) Branislav Ivanović
- (Serbia) Nikola Žigić

2 goals

- (Austria) Erwin Hoffer
- (France) Nicolas Anelka
- (France) Karim Benzema
- (Lithuania) Mindaugas Kalonas
- (Romania) Gheorghe Bucur
- (Romania) Ciprian Marica
- (Serbia) Miloš Krasić
- (Serbia) Nenad Milijaš

1 goal

- (Austria) René Aufhauser
- (Austria) Andreas Ivanschitz
- (Austria) Stefan Maierhofer
- (Austria) Franz Schiemer
- (Austria) Martin Stranzl
- (Austria) Roman Wallner
- (Faroe Islands) Egil á Bø
- (Faroe Islands) Arnbjørn Hansen
- (Faroe Islands) Bogi Løkin
- (Faroe Islands) Andreas Lava Olsen
- (Faroe Islands) Suni Olsen
- (France) William Gallas
- (France) Sidney Govou
- (France) Yoann Gourcuff
- (Lithuania) Saulius Mikoliūnas
- (Romania) Iulian Apostol
- (Romania) Răzvan Cociş
- (Romania) Dorin Goian
- (Romania) Ionuţ Mazilu
- (Romania) Florentin Petre
- (Romania) Dorel Stoica
- (Romania) Cristian Tănase
- (Serbia) Zdravko Kuzmanović
- (Serbia) Ivan Obradović
- (Serbia) Marko Pantelić
- (Serbia) Neven Subotić
- (Serbia) Zoran Tošić

1 own goal

- (Faroe Islands) Jón Rói Jacobsen (against Serbia)
- (France) Julien Escudé (against Romania)
- (Romania) Dorel Stoica (against Serbia)

== Attendances ==
Team	Highest	Lowest	Average
Austria	48,000	12,300	29,100
Faroe Islands	2,974	805	2,053
France	79,543	16,755	61,127
Lithuania	8,700	2,000	5,210
Romania	15,000	7,505	12,461
Serbia	49,456	9,615	32,382
