= Dorel Stoica =

Romanian footballer (born 1978)

Personal information
- Date of birth: 15 December 1978 (age 47)
- Place of birth: Drobeta-Turnu Severin, Romania
- Height: 1.80 m (5 ft 11 in)
- Positions: Defensive midfielder; centre-back

Team information
- Current team: Tractorul Cetate (player-manager)
- Number: 30

Youth career
- 1982–1995: CŞS Severin
- 1995–1996: Drobeta-Turnu Severin

Senior career*
| Years | Team | Apps | (Gls) |
| 1996–2001 | Drobeta-Turnu Severin | 115 | (10) |
| 2001–2003 | Dierna Orşova | 15 | (0) |
| 2003–2004 | Extensiv Craiova | 15 | (0) |
| 2004–2005 | FC Caracal | 29 | (1) |
| 2005–2010 | Universitatea Craiova | 134 | (10) |
| 2010 | Al-Ettifaq | 7 | (0) |
| 2010 | Steaua București | 5 | (1) |
| 2010–2011 | Universitatea Craiova | 28 | (4) |
| 2011–2012 | Dinamo București | 10 | (1) |
| 2013 | CS Turnu Severin | 12 | (1) |
| 2013 | Universitatea Craiova | 15 | (0) |
| 2015–2020 | Tractorul Cetate | 92 | (25) |
| Total | | 477 | (53) |

International career^{‡}
| 2007–2009 | Romania | 4 | (1) |

Managerial career
- 2015–: Tractorul Cetate
- * Club domestic league appearances and goals as of 8 June 2016 ‡ National team caps and goals as of 4 February 2014

Dorel Stoica (born 15 December 1978, in Drobeta-Turnu Severin) is a Romanian professional footballer. He manages and plays for Tractorul Cetate.

== Club career ==
He started his career with Extensiv Craiova in 2003. A year later, he moved to FC Caracal. In 2005, Stoica was transferred to Universitatea Craiova where he made his breakthrough in Romanian football. Later, he became captain of Universitatea and joined the national team. On 5 January 2010, his move to Saudi Arabian side Al-Ettifaq was made official. He signed a 6-month contract, with a monthly payment of €30,000.

=== Steaua București ===
In June 2010, the former captain of Universitatea Craiova moved back in Romania to play for Steaua București in Liga 1, following coach Victor Pițurcă.

In his first match for Steaua, Dorel scored a goal at the Stadionul Cetate. He equalled the score in the 45th minute after Claudiu Niculescu opened the score in the 8th, Steaua won away with 2–1.

=== Universitatea Craiova ===
After only two months playing for Steaua he was sold back to Universitatea Craiova, because coach Victor Piţurcă resigned before round three of the new season and the new coach Ilie Dumitrescu no longer needed his services.

=== Dinamo București ===
Following Universitatea Craiova's disaffiliation, Stoica became a free agent and joined Dinamo București, on a two-year contract, entering the list of footballers who played for the great rivals Steaua and Dinamo. In the summer of 2012, he was released from Dinamo by mutual agreement. He played for giants 10 caps and score 1 goal, in a match against FC Vaslui. The team won the Romanian Cup in May 2012.

=== CS Turnu Severin ===
In February 2013 he moved to CS Turnu Severin. He was released in summer 2013.

=== Back to Universitatea Craiova ===
In July 2013, the 34-year-old Stoica returned to Universitatea Craiova, the club where he spent the majority of his career.

== International goals ==
Scores and results list Romania's goal tally first. "Score" column indicates the score after the player's goal.

| # | Date | Venue | Opponent | Score | Result | Competition |
|---|---|---|---|---|---|---|
| 1. | 28 March 2009 | Stadionul Farul, Constanța, Romania | Serbia | 2–3 | 2–3 | FIFA World Cup 2010 Qualifying |

== Honours ==
Dinamo București

- Romanian Cup: 2011–12
