= Gari Uranga =

Spanish footballer

Personal information
- Full name: Garikoitz Uranga Luluaga
- Date of birth: 21 June 1980 (age 46)
- Place of birth: Tolosa, Spain
- Height: 1.82 m (5 ft 11 1/2 in)
- Position: Winger

Youth career
- Tolosa
- Real Sociedad

Senior career*
Years	Team	Apps	(Gls)
2000–2002	Real Sociedad B	67	(8)
2002–2008	Real Sociedad	116	(9)
2003	→ Eibar (loan)	19	(2)
2003–2004	→ Getafe (loan)	38	(5)
2008–2010	Castellón	52	(6)
Total		292	(30)

International career
2005–2006	Basque Country	3	(1)
- * Club domestic league appearances and goals

Garikoitz 'Gari' Uranga Luluaga (born 21 June 1980) is a Spanish former professional footballer who played mainly as a left winger.

== Club career ==
Uranga was born in Tolosa, Gipuzkoa. A product of Basque Country giants Real Sociedad's youth system, he played one game for its first team in 2001–02's La Liga then spent two seasons on loan in the Segunda División, being instrumental to Getafe CF's first ever top-flight promotion.

Over the next four seasons after his return, Uranga would be regularly used by Real, appearing in 33 scoreless matches in 2005–06 but missing several months of the following campaign, which ended in relegation after 40 years, due to a knee injury. His father Luis was also club president during that period.

After his contract expired, Uranga signed a two-year deal with CD Castellón also in the second tier. He retired in June 2010 at only 30 as the Valencian Community side suffered relegation, having made 225 appearances at the professional level in an eight-year career (22 goals).
