= Dietmar Drabek =

Austrian football referee

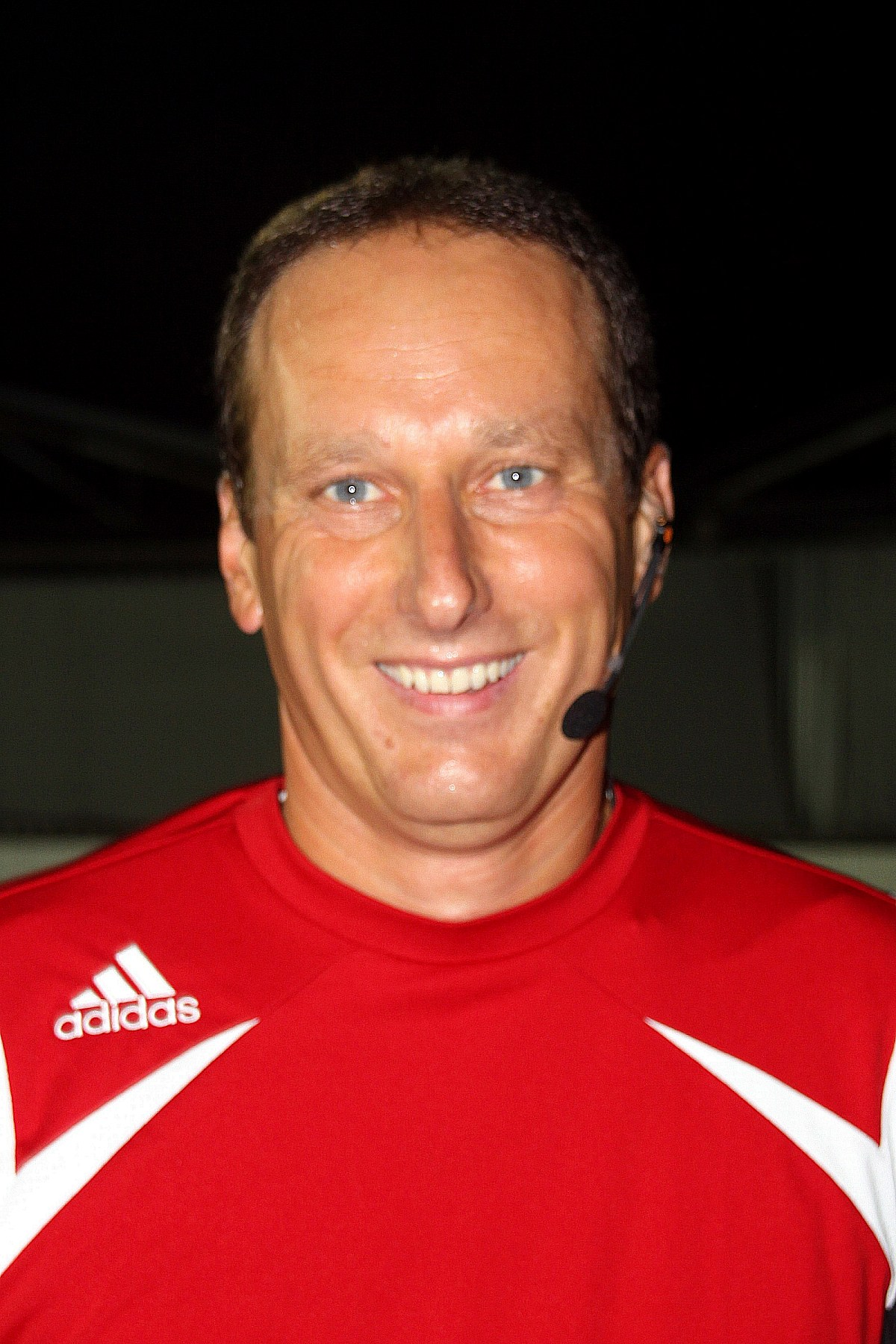
- Dietmar Drabek in September 2009
- Born: 30 June 1965 (age 60); Steyr
- Height: 185 cm (6 ft 1 in)
- Title: FIFA referee
- Term: 1997–2006

Dietmar Drabek (born 30 June 1965) is a former Austrian football referee. He is a member of the Upper Austrian Football Association. Drabek was an international FIFA referee from 1997 to 2006. Since 2011, he has been a speaker for refereeing development and head of talent funding for the Upper Austrian referees.

== Life ==
Dietmar Drabek was born in Steyr. His father was also a referee, who had begun his career at the age of 17 and, according to his own accounts, managed around 3700 games, including 84 games of the Bundesliga or its predecessor the Nationalliga. At the age of nine, Dietmar Drabek started playing football, in the junior category, of the then second division SK Vorwärts Steyr. Drabek soon decided to become a referee and at the age of 17 completed the referee examination.

Initially, Dietmar Drabek refereed games in the Upper Austrian lower leagues. In 1992, he began directed games in the Upper Austrian League, which was then the third highest league. Only two years later, the trained retail salesperson, directed games in the second highest league, the Erste Liga. On 1 July 1994 he was in the squad of the Bundesliga referees. He refereed his first game in the National League, on 13 August 1994, between FC Puch and the SV Stockerau (1-1).

Just one year later he referring in the Austrian Bundesliga. His first game there was on 1 April 1, 1995, where SK Sturm Graz played against FC Admira Wacker Mödling (2-2).

Drabek became a FIFA referee in 1997 and directed 40 international matches. Taking into account the assignments as Assistant referee (association football) and as fourth official, Drabek can account for 67 foreign assignments in 39 different European countries. Drabek's career included one negative event. On 5 May 2005 he had to stop the match between FK Austria Wien and Grazer AK in the 80th minute after FK Austria Wien fans stormed the pitch in protest against the poor performance of their team. Since security could not bring the situation under control, a halt to the game could not be avoided. The match was replayed on 9 May 2005, with a 3:0 win for Grazer AK. Bundesliga board member, Georg Pangl praised Drabek's prudent behaviour he demonstrated while dealing with the situation.
