= Jón Rói Jacobsen =

Faroese footballer (born 1983)

Personal information
- Date of birth: 7 April 1983 (age 43)
- Place of birth: Faroe Islands
- Height: 1.86 m (6 ft 1 in)
- Position: Defender

Senior career*
Years	Team	Apps	(Gls)
1999–2003	HB Tórshavn	52	(25)
2003–2004	→ Brøndby IF (loan)	4	(0)
2004–2005	BK Frem	42	(5)
2006–2008	AaB Aalborg	23	(1)
2008–2009	BK Frem	14	(1)

International career^{‡}
2001–2008	Faroe Islands	36	(0)
- * Club domestic league appearances and goals as of 13 February 2009 ‡ National team caps and goals as of 7 October 2007

Jón Rói Jacobsen (born 7 April 1983) is a Faroese former football defender.

== Club career ==
Once hailed as Faroese most promising football talent, Jacobsen started his career as a striker for HB Torshavn, scoring 12 goals in the 2002 league season to end up 3rd in that seasons' goalscorers chart. His versatility gave him the chance to play in the Danish league, where he played for Brøndby IF and BK Frem before signing up for AaB Aalborg in 2006. He moved back to BK Frem in July 2008 with the hope to have more playing chances.

== International career ==
Jacobsen made his debut for the Faroese national team in a June 2001 World Cup qualifying match against Switzerland, coming on as a substitute for Uni Arge. He collected 36 caps in total. In 2008, 25-year-old Jacobsen retired from professional football, to fully concentrate on his medical studies in Copenhagen.

== Honours ==
Individual

- Boldklubben Frem Player of the Year (1) : 2005
