= Stadionul Farul =

Romanian stadium

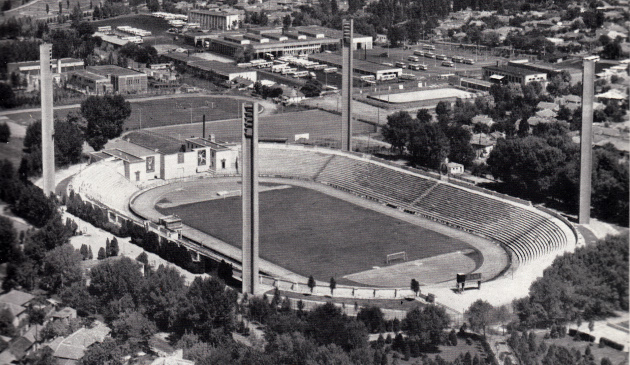
- Stadionul Farul in the 1980s.
- Interactive map of Stadionul Farul
- Former names: Stadionul 1 Mai; Stadionul Gheorghe Hagi
- Address: Str. Primăverii, Nr. 2
- Location: Constanţa, Romania
- Coordinates: 44°11′50.28″N 28°38′21.60″E
- Owner: Municipality of Constanța
- Capacity: 15,520 seated
- Surface: Grass
- Field size: 105 x 68 m

Construction
- Opened: 1954
- Renovated: 1970; 1999
- Closed: 2022
- Demolished: 2023

Tenants
- Farul Constanța (1955–2021); Săgeata Năvodari (2013–2014); Viitorul Constanța (2012–2013); Farul II Constanța (2021–2022)

Stadionul Gheorghe Hagi (formerly known as the Stadionul Farul) was a multi-purpose stadium in Constanța, which, since its construction in 1954, was the home of the football club Farul Constanța. The stadium was closed in 2022 and demolished in 2023, to build a new one on the same site.

== History ==
The stadium had also functions as an athletics arena, with track and field athletics facilities. In 1970, Stadionul Farul was the first stadium in Romania to host a floodlit football match. The stadium has played host to the Romania national football team, in the World Cup 2006 Qualification, UEFA Euro 2008 qualifying and 2010 FIFA World Cup qualification.

== Romania national football team ==
The following national team matches were held in the stadium:

#	Date	Score	Opponent	Competition
1.	20 September 1988	3–0	Albania	Friendly match
2.	26 April 2000	2–0	Cyprus	Friendly match
3.	27 March 2002	4–1	Ukraine	Friendly match
4.	8 June 2005	3–0	Armenia	2006 FIFA World Cup qualification
5.	17 August 2005	2–0	Andorra	2006 FIFA World Cup qualification
6.	3 September 2005	2–0	Czech Republic	2006 FIFA World Cup qualification
7.	16 August 2006	2–0	Cyprus	Friendly match
8.	2 September 2006	2–2	Bulgaria	UEFA Euro 2008 qualifying
9.	13 October 2007	1–0	Netherlands	UEFA Euro 2008 qualifying
10.	11 October 2008	2–2	France	2010 FIFA World Cup qualification
11.	28 March 2009	2–3	Serbia	2010 FIFA World Cup qualification

== See also ==
- List of football stadiums in Romania
