= Vytautas (given name) =

- Gender: Male
- Language: Lithuanian
- Name day: 5 January

Other gender
- Feminine: Vytautė

Origin
- Region of origin: Lithuania

Other names
- Nicknames: Vitas, Vytas, Vytis, Tautas, Tautis, Taučius

Vytautas is a pre-Christian Lithuanian given name derived from East Baltic roots vyti/vyd "chase, pursuer; to see" and tauta "land; country," first attested from Vytautas the Great. This name has become a popular Lithuanian masculine given name.

The feminine form is Vytautė. Diminutive: Vytas.

== In other languages ==
In Slavic languages, its Polish form is Witold, which later on was rendered as Vitol'd in Belarusian, Vitoldas in Lithuanian (re-assimilated), and Vitol'd in Russian.

Other forms became Vitaut (Belarusian), Witowt (Polish) and Vitovt (Russian).

== Notable people ==
Notable people with the name Vytautas or Vitautas include:

- Vytautas Andriuškevičius (born 1990), Lithuanian footballer
- Vytautas Apanavičius (born 1973), Lithuanian football midfielder
- Vytautas Babravičius or Simas (born 1952), Lithuanian country and folk rock musician
- Vytautas Bacevičius (1905–1970), Lithuanian composer
- Vytautas Barkauskas (born 1931), Lithuanian composer and music educator
- Vytautas Beliajus (1908–1994), Lithuanian folk dancer and instructor
- Vytautas Pranas Bičiūnas (1893–1943), Lithuanian painter, theatre actor, writer and literary critic
- Vytautas Briedis (born 1940), Lithuanian rower and Olympic medalist
- Vytautas Bubnys (1932–2021), Lithuanian writer and politician
- Vytautas Bulvičius (1908–1941), Lithuanian military officer, major of the General Staff, and leader of the anti-Soviet Lithuanian Activist Front (LAF)
- Vytautas Butkus (born 1949), Lithuanian rower and Olympic medalist
- Vytautas Čekanauskas (1930–2010), Lithuanian architect
- Vytautas Černiauskas (born 1989), Lithuanian football goalkeeper
- Vytautas "Vitas" Gerulaitis (1954–1994), American tennis player
- Vytautas Andrius Graičiūnas (1898–1952), Lithuanian management theorist, management consultant and engineer
- Vytautas Janulionis (1958–2010), Lithuanian glass artist
- Vytautas Janušaitis (born 1981), Lithuanian swimmer and Olympic competitor
- Vytautas Kazimieras Jonynas (1907–1997), Lithuanian artist, sculptor, illustrator and furniture designer
- Vytautas Juozapaitis (born 1963), Lithuanian singer
- Vytautas Kavolis (1930–1996), Lithuanian/American sociologist, literary critic and historian
- Vytautas Kernagis (1951–2008), Lithuanian singer-songwriter, bard, actor, director and television announcer
- Vytautas Klova (1926–2009), Lithuanian composer and educator
- Vytautas Kolesnikovas (born 1948), Lithuanian painter, graphic artist and politician
- Vytautas Kubilius (1928–2004), Lithuanian literary critic and political activist
- Vytautas Lalas (born 1982), Lithuanian professional strongman competitor
- Vytautas Landsbergis (born 1932), Lithuanian politician and parliamentarian
- Vytautas Lukša (born 1984), Lithuanian footballer
- Vytautas Mačernis (1921–1944), Lithuanian existentialist poet
- Vytautas Mažiulis (1926–2009), Lithuanian linguist
- Vytautas Merkys (1929–2012), Lithuanian historian
- Vytautas Miškinis (born 1954), Lithuanian composer and conductor
- Vytautas Montvila (1935–2003), Lithuanian composer, bassoonist and sound engineer
- Vytautas Paliūnas (born 1930), Lithuanian politician
- Vytautas Petrulis (1890–1942), Lithuanian politician, former Prime Minister of Lithuania
- Vytautas Petras Plečkaitis (born 1950), Lithuanian politician
- Vytautas Pociūnas (1957–2006), Lithuanian physicist, politician and diplomat
- Vytautas Adolfas Puplauskas (born 1930), Lithuanian politician
- Vytautas Sakalauskas (1933–2001), Lithuanian Soviet politician
- Vytautas Stanionis (1917–1966), Lithuanian photographer
- Vytautas Straižys (born 1936), Lithuanian astronomer
- Vytautas Šulskis (born 1988), Lithuanian basketball player
- Vytautas Šustauskas (born 1945), Lithuanian politician
- Vytautas Vaičikonis, Lithuanian sprint canoeist
- Vytautas Valius (1930–2004), Lithuanian painter and graphic designer
- Vytautas Vičiulis (1951–1989), Lithuanian painter, antiques restorer and anti-Soviet protester
- Vytautas Žalakevičius (1930–1996), Lithuanian film director and writer
