= Ukraine national football team results (2010–2019) =

This is a list of the Ukraine national football team results from 2010 to 2019.

== Results ==
=== 2010 ===
25 May 2010 Friendly International	Ukraine	4–0	Lithuania	Kharkiv, Ukraine
20:00 UTC+3	Aliyev 10', 17'; Shevchenko 68' (pen.), 78'	Report (ukr)		Attendance: 31,000; Referee: Stanislav Sukhina (Russia)

29 May 2010 Friendly International	Ukraine	3–2	Romania	Lviv, Ukraine
20:30 UTC+3	Aliyev 15'; Konoplyanka 75'; Tamaş 79' (o.g.)	Report	Tamaş 53'; D.Niculae 62'	Attendance: 22,000; Referee: Pavel Kralovec (Czech)

2 June 2010 Friendly International	Norway	0–1	Ukraine	Oslo, Norway
19:00 UTC+1		Report (ru); Report/video (no)	Zozulya 78'	Attendance: 10,178; Referee: Kevin Blom (Netherlands)

11 August 2010 Friendly International	Ukraine	1–1	Netherlands	Donbas Arena, Donetsk
21:00 UTC+1	Aliyev 74'	report	Lens 72'	Attendance: 18,054; Referee: Damir Skomina (Slovenia)

4 September 2010 Friendly International	Poland	1–1	Ukraine	Stadion Widzewa, Łódź
17:00 UTC+1	Jeleń 42'	Report (en); Report (ru); Video report	Seleznyov 90+2'	Attendance: 6,500; Referee: Ravshan Ermatov (Uzbekistan)

7 September 2010 Friendly International	Ukraine	2–1	Chile	Lobanovsky Dynamo Stadium, Kyiv
20:00 UTC+1	Rakytskiy 36'; Aliyev 65'	Report (uk)	Isla 87'	Attendance: 6,000; Referee: Vitali Sevostyanik (Belarus)

8 October 2010 Friendly International	Ukraine	2–2	Canada	Lobanovsky Dynamo Stadium, Kyiv
20:00 UTC+1	Milevsky 59'; Tymoshchuk 80'	Report	Jackson 12'; Hutchinson 29'	Attendance: 10,000; Referee: Tomacz Mikulski (Poland)

11 October 2010 Friendly International	Brazil	2–0	Ukraine	Pride Park, Derby, England
19:30 UTC+1	Alves 25'; Pato 64'	Report		Attendance: 13,088; Referee: Martin Atkinson (England)

17 November 2010 Friendly International	Switzerland	2–2	Ukraine	Stade de Genève, Geneva
19:15 UTC+1	Frei 40', 62'	Report	Yarmolenko 48'; Konoplyanka 75'	Attendance: 11,100; Referee: Serge Gumienny (Belgium)

=== 2011 ===
8 February 2011 Cytavision Cyprus Tournament semi-final	Romania	2–2 (2–4 p)	Ukraine	Paralimni, Cyprus
18:30 UTC+2	Alexa 33', 44'	Report; Video report	Rakytskiy 24'; Milevsky 31'	Referee: Stelios Trifonos, (Cyprus)
	Penalties
	Zicu (penalty missed); Papp (penalty missed); Ganea (penalty scored); Raţ (penalty scored)		Yarmolenko (penalty scored); Tymoshchuk (penalty scored); Kravets (penalty scored); Husyev (penalty missed); Rotan (penalty scored)

9 February 2011 Cytavision Cyprus Tournament final	Sweden	1–1 (4–5 p)	Ukraine	GSP Stadium, Nicosia, Cyprus
18:30 UTC+2	Elmander 7'	Report (ru); Video report	Dević 20' (pen.)	Attendance: 2,000; Referee: Leontios Tratos, (Cyprus)
	Penalties
	Granqvist (penalty scored); Källström (penalty missed); Larsson (penalty scored); Eriksson (penalty scored); Lustig (penalty scored); Bajrami (penalty missed)		Kravets (penalty missed); Tymoshchuk (penalty scored); Aliyev (penalty scored); Morozyuk (penalty scored); Rotan (penalty scored); Konoplyanka (penalty scored)

29 March 2011 Friendly international	Ukraine	0–2	Italy	Lobanovsky Dynamo Stadium, Kyiv
19:45 UTC+3		Report	Rossi 27'; Matri 81'	Attendance: 15,000; Referee: Alexey Nikolaev, (Russia)

1 June 2011 Friendly international	Ukraine	2–0	Uzbekistan	Lobanovsky Dynamo Stadium, Kyiv
19:00 UTC+3	Tymoshchuk 55'; Voronin 60'	Report		Referee: Ozkahya Halis (Turkey)

6 June 2011 Friendly international	Ukraine	1–4	France	Donbas Arena, Donetsk
22:00 UTC+3	Tymoshchuk 53'	Report	Gameiro 58'; Martin 87', 90+2'; Kaboul 89'	Referee: Mark Clattenburg (England)

10 August 2011 Friendly international	Ukraine	0–1	Sweden	Metalist Stadium, Kharkiv
21:00 UTC+3		Report	Hysén 90+2'	Referee: Paolo Tagliavento (Italy)

2 September 2011 Friendly international	Ukraine	2–3	Uruguay	Metalist Stadium, Kharkiv
21:00 UTC+3	Yarmolenko 1'; Konoplyanka 45'	Report	González 43'; Lugano 60'; Hernández 87'	Referee: Björn Kuipers, (Holland)

6 September 2011 Friendly international	Czech Republic	4–0	Ukraine	Generali Arena, Prague
20:00 UTC+3	Kadlec 3' (pen.), 12'; Rezek 47'; Kolář 51'	Report		Referee: Richard Trutz (Slovakia)

7 October 2011 Friendly international	Ukraine	3–0	Bulgaria	Lobanovsky Dynamo Stadium, Kyiv
19:45 UTC+3	Selin 7'; Shevchenko 38'; Yarmolenko 82'	Report		Referee: Pavel Karlovets (Czech Rep.)

11 October 2011 Friendly international	Estonia	0–2	Ukraine	A. Le Coq Arena, Tallinn
20:00 UTC+3		Report	Husyev 45+1'; Aliyev 68'	Referee: Robert Malek (Poland)

11 November 2011 Friendly international	Ukraine	3–3	Germany	Olimpiysky National Sports Complex, Kyiv
20:45 UTC+3	Yarmolenko 28'; Konoplyanka 36'; Nazarenko 45'	Report	Kroos 38'; Rolfes 65'; Müller 77'	Attendance: 69,700; Referee: Carlos Velasco Carballo (Spain)

15 November 2011 Friendly international	Ukraine	2–1	Austria	Arena Lviv, Lviv
21:00 UTC+3	Milevskiy 18' Devich 90+2'	Report	Kucher 71' (o.g.)	Attendance: 31,879; Referee: Svein Oddvar Moen, (Norway)

=== 2012 ===
29 February 2012 Friendly international	Israel	2–3	Ukraine	HaMoshava Stadium, Petah Tikva, Israel
18:00	Hemed 55' (pen.); Sahar 63'	Report	Husyev 16' (pen.); Konoplyanka 45'; Yarmolenko 61'	Attendance: 4,000; Referee: Szymon Marciniak (Poland)

28 May 2012 Friendly international	Estonia	0–4	Ukraine	Kufstein Arena, Kufstein, Austria
20:00		Report	Yarmolenko 9'; Husyev 35' (pen.); Voronin 41'; Milevskiy 50'	Attendance: 1,200; Referee: Harald Lechner (Austria)

1 June 2012 Friendly international	Austria	3–2	Ukraine	Tivoli-Neu, Innsbruck, Austria
21:30 UTC+2	Junuzović 3'; Arnautović 62', 89'	Report	Husyev 56', 65'	Attendance: 13,000; Referee: Felix Zwayer (Germany)

5 June 2012 Friendly international	Turkey	2–0	Ukraine	Audi Sportpark, Ingolstadt, Germany
20:00 UTC+2	Erkin 30'; Pektemek 70'	Report		Referee: Michael Weiner (Germany)

11 June 2012 UEFA Euro 2012 Group D	Ukraine	2–1	Sweden	Olympic Stadium, Kyiv
21:45	Shevchenko 55', 62'	Report	Ibrahimović 52'	Attendance: 64,290; Referee: Cüneyt Çakır (Turkey)

15 June 2012 UEFA Euro 2012 Group D	Ukraine	0–2	France	Donbas Arena, Donetsk
19:00		Report	Ménez 53'; Cabaye 56'	Attendance: 48,000; Referee: Björn Kuipers (Netherlands)

19 June 2012 UEFA Euro 2012 Group D	England	1–0	Ukraine	Donbas Arena, Donetsk
21:45	Rooney 48'	Report		Attendance: 48,700; Referee: Viktor Kassai (Hungary)

15 August 2012 Friendly international	Ukraine	0–0	Czech Republic	Arena Lviv, Lviv
20:00 UTC+3		Report		Attendance: 33,153; Referee: Milorad Mažić (Serbia)

11 September 2012 2014 FIFA World Cup qualification – UEFA Group H	England	1–1	Ukraine	Wembley Stadium, London
20:00 UTC+01:00	Lampard 87' (pen.)	Report	Konoplyanka 38'	Attendance: 68,102; Referee: Cüneyt Çakır (Turkey)

12 October 2012 2014 FIFA World Cup qualification – UEFA Group H	Moldova	0–0	Ukraine	Zimbru Stadium, Chișinău
21:00 UTC+01:00		Report		Attendance: 12,500; Referee: Clément Turpin (France)

16 October 2012 2014 FIFA World Cup qualification – UEFA Group H	Ukraine	0–1	Montenegro	Olympic Stadium, Kyiv
14:00 UTC+01:00		Report	45+1' Damjanovic	Attendance: 50,597; Referee: Michael Koukoulakis (GRE)

14 November 2012 Friendly International	Bulgaria	0–1	Ukraine	Levski Stadium, Sofia
		Report	33' Kucher	Referee: Milorad Mažić (Serbia)

=== 2013 ===
6 February 2013 Friendly International	Norway	0–2	Ukraine	Estadio de La Cartuja, Seville
19:00 UTC+1		Report (Ukr)	Morozyuk 17'; Yarmolenko 42'	Attendance: 2,000; Referee: Carlos Clos Gómez (Spain)

22 March 2013 2014 FIFA World Cup qualification – UEFA Group H	Poland	1–3	Ukraine	Stadion Narodowy, Warsaw
20:45 UTC+1	Piszczek 18'	Report	Yarmolenko 2'; Husyev 7'; Zozulya 45'	Attendance: 55,565; Referee: Pavel Královec (Czech Republic)

26 March 2013 2014 FIFA World Cup qualification – UEFA Group H	Ukraine	2–1	Moldova	Chornomorets Stadium, Odesa
21:00 UTC+2	Yarmolenko 61'; Khacheridi 71'	Report	Suvorov 80'	Attendance: 31,948; Referee: Kenn Hansen (Denmark)

2 June 2013 Friendly international	Ukraine	0–0	Cameroon	Olimpiyskiy Stadium, Kyiv, Ukraine
21:00 UTC+2		Report		Attendance: 25,000; Referee: Vladislav Bezborodov (Russia)

7 June 2013 2014 FIFA World Cup qualification – UEFA Group H	Montenegro	0–4	Ukraine	Podgorica City Stadium, Podgorica
20:30 UTC+2		Report	Harmash 52'; Konoplyanka 77'; Fedetskiy 85'; Bezus 90+2'	Attendance: 11,996; Referee: Manuel Gräfe (Germany)

14 August 2013 Friendly international	Ukraine	2–0	Israel	Olimpiyskiy National Sports Complex, Kyiv
21:00 UTC+2	Rotan 27'; Seleznyov 71'	Report		Attendance: 25,637; Referee: Ivan Kružliak (Slovakia)

6 September 2013 2014 FIFA World Cup qualification – UEFA Group H	Ukraine	9–0	San Marino	Arena Lviv, Lviv
21:00 UTC+3	Dević 11'; Seleznyov 26'; Edmar 32'; Khacheridi 45+1', 54'; Konoplyanka 50'; Bezus 63'; Fedetskiy 75'; Rakitskiy 90+4'	Report		Attendance: 34,915; Referee: Neil Doyle (Republic of Ireland)

10 September 2013 2014 FIFA World Cup qualification – UEFA Group H	Ukraine	0–0	England	Olympic Stadium, Kyiv
21:45 UTC+3		Report		Attendance: 69,890; Referee: Pedro Proença (Portugal)

11 October 2013 2014 FIFA World Cup qualification – UEFA Group H	Ukraine	1–0	Poland	Metalist Stadium, Kharkiv
21:00 UTC+3	Yarmolenko 64'	Report		Attendance: 39,126; Referee: Jonas Eriksson (Sweden)

15 October 2013 2014 FIFA World Cup qualification – UEFA Group H	San Marino	0–8	Ukraine	Stadio Olimpico, Serravalle
21:00 UTC+2		Report	Seleznyov 13' (pen.), 18'; Dević 15', 51', 57' (pen.); Yarmolenko 55'; Bezus 65'; Mandzyuk 80'	Attendance: 1,268; Referee: Harald Lechner (Austria)

15 November 2013 2014 FIFA World Cup qualification – UEFA second round	Ukraine	2–0	France	Olympic Stadium, Kyiv
21:45 UTC+2	Zozulya 61'; Yarmolenko 82' (pen.)	Report		Attendance: 67,732; Referee: Cüneyt Çakır (Turkey)

19 November 2013 2014 FIFA World Cup qualification – UEFA second round	France	3–0	Ukraine	Stade de France, Saint-Denis
TBC UTC+1	Sakho 22'; Benzema 34'; Sakho 72'	Report		Attendance: 77,000; Referee: Damir Skomina (Slovenia)

=== 2014 ===
5 March 2014 Friendly International	Ukraine	2–0	United States	Antonis Papadopoulos Stadium, Larnaca, Cyprus^{(10)}
CET (UTC+2)	Yarmolenko 11'; Dević 68'	Report		Attendance: 1,573; Referee: Leontios Trattou (Cyprus)

22 May 2014 Friendly international	Ukraine	2–1	Niger	V. Lobanovskyi Stadium, Kyiv, Ukraine
21:00 UTC+2	Ordets 20'; Stepanenko 80'	Report	Balé 56'	Attendance: 8,000; Referee: Paweł Gil (Poland)

3 September 2014 Friendly international	Ukraine	1–0	Moldova	Olympic Stadium, Kyiv
20:00 UTC+2	Bezus 63'	Report		Attendance: 15,000; Referee: Ovidiu Hațegan (Romania)

8 September 2014 UEFA Euro 2016 qualifying Group C	Ukraine	0–1	Slovakia	Olympic Stadium, Kyiv, Ukraine
20:45 UTC+1		Report	Mak 17'	Attendance: 38,454; Referee: Craig Thomson (Scotland)

9 October 2014 UEFA Euro 2016 qualifying Group C	Belarus	0–2	Ukraine	Borisov Arena, Borisov
20:45 UTC+1		Report	Martynovich 82' (o.g.); Sydorchuk 90+2'	Attendance: 10,512; Referee: Pol van Boekel (Netherlands)

12 October 2014 UEFA Euro 2016 qualifying Group C	Ukraine	1–0	Macedonia	Arena Lviv, Lviv
18:00 UTC+1	Sydorchuk 45+2'	Report		Attendance: 33,978; Referee: Sébastien Delferière (Belgium)

15 November 2014 UEFA Euro 2016 qualifying Group C	Luxembourg	0–3	Ukraine	Stade Josy Barthel, Luxembourg
18:00 UTC+1		Report	Yarmolenko 33', 53', 56'	Attendance: 4,379; Referee: Kristinn Jakobsson (Iceland)

18 November 2014 Friendly International	Ukraine	0–0	Lithuania	Olympic Stadium, Kyiv, Ukraine
20:00 UTC+1		Report		Attendance: 15,000; Referee: Äliyar Ağayev (Azerbaijan)

=== 2015 ===
27 March 2015 UEFA Euro 2016 Q	Spain	1–0	Ukraine	Seville, Spain
20:45 UTC+1	Morata 28'	Report		Stadium: Ramón Sánchez Pizjuán; Attendance: 33,775; Referee: Cüneyt Çakır (Turkey)

31 March 2015 Friendly	Ukraine	1–1	Latvia	Lviv, Ukraine
20:00 UTC+1	Yarmolenko 35'	Report	Maksimenko 90+2'	Stadium: Arena Lviv; Attendance: 17,500; Referee: Harald Lechner (Austria)

9 June 2015 Friendly	Ukraine	2–1	Georgia	Linz, Austria
	Kravets 57'; Konoplyanka 67'	Report	Vatsadze 81'	Stadium: Linzer Stadion; Attendance: 700; Referee: Markus Hameter (Austria)

14 June 2015 UEFA Euro 2016 Q	Ukraine	3–0	Luxembourg	Lviv, Ukraine
18:00 (19:00 UTC+3)	Kravets 49'; Harmash 57'; Konoplyanka 86'	Report		Stadium: Arena Lviv; Attendance: 21,635; Referee: Arnold Hunter (Northern Ireland)

5 September 2015 UEFA Euro 2016 Q	Ukraine	3–1	Belarus	Lviv, Ukraine
18:00 (19:00 UTC+3)	Kravets 7'; Yarmolenko 30'; Konoplyanka 40' (pen.)	Report	Kornilenko 62' (pen.)	Stadium: Arena Lviv; Referee: Liran Liany (Israel)

8 September 2015 UEFA Euro 2016 Q	Slovakia	0–0	Ukraine	Žilina, Slovakia
20:45 (20:45 UTC+2)		Report		Stadium: Štadión Pod Dubňom; Referee: Martin Atkinson (England)

9 October 2015 UEFA Euro 2016 Q	Macedonia	0–2	Ukraine	Skopje, Republic of Macedonia
20:45 (20:45 UTC+2)		Report	Seleznyov 59' (pen.); Kravets 87'	Stadium: Philip II Arena; Referee: Ovidiu Haţegan (Romania)

12 October 2015 UEFA Euro 2016 Q	Ukraine	0–1	Spain	Kyiv, Ukraine
20:45 (21:45 UTC+3)		Report	Gaspar 22'	Stadium: Olympic Stadium; Referee: Milorad Mažić (Serbia)

14 November 2015 UEFA Euro 2016 Q play-offs	Ukraine	2–0	Slovenia	Lviv, Ukraine
19:00	Yarmolenko 23'; Seleznyov 54'	Report		Stadium: Arena Lviv; Referee: Jonas Eriksson (Sweden)

17 November 2015 UEFA Euro 2016 Q play-offs	Slovenia	1–1	Ukraine	Maribor, Slovenia
20:45	Cesar 11'	Report	Yarmolenko 90+7'	Stadium: Ljudski vrt Referee: Cüneyt Çakır (Turkey)

=== 2016 ===
24 March 2016 Friendly	Ukraine	1–0	Cyprus	Odesa, Ukraine
	Stepanenko 40'			Stadium: Chornomorets Stadium; Referee: Orel Grinfield (Israel)

28 March 2016 Friendly	Ukraine	1–0	Wales	Kyiv, Ukraine
	Yarmolenko 28'	Report		Stadium: Olympic Stadium; Attendance: 20,000

29 May 2016 Friendly	Romania	3–4	Ukraine	Turin, Italy
20:30	Torje 23'; Alibec 74'; Stanciu 84'	Report	Zozulya 43'; Zinchenko 48'; Konoplyanka 54'; Yarmolenko 59'	Stadium: Stadio Olimpico Grande; Attendance: 12000; Referee: Davide Massa (Italy)

3 June 2016 Friendly	Ukraine	3–1	Albania	Bergamo, Italy
20:30	Stepanenko 8'; Yarmolenko 49'; Konoplyanka 87'	Report	Sadiku 12'	Stadium: Stadio Atleti Azzurri d'Italia; Referee: Paolo Mazzoleni (Italy)

12 June 2016 UEFA Euro 2016 Group Stage	Germany	2–0	Ukraine	Lille, France
21:00 (22:00 UTC+3)	Mustafi 19'; Schweinsteiger 90+2'	Report		Stadium: Stade Pierre-Mauroy; Attendance: 43,035; Referee: Martin Atkinson (England)

16 June 2016 UEFA Euro 2016 Group Stage	Ukraine	0–2	Northern Ireland	Lyon, France
18:00 (19:00 UTC+3)		Report	McAuley 49'; McGinn 90+6'	Stadium: Stade des Lumières; Attendance: 51,043; Referee: Pavel Královec (Czech Republic)

21 June 2016 UEFA Euro 2016 Group Stage	Ukraine	0–1	Poland	Marseille, France
18:00 (19:00 UTC+3)			Błaszczykowski 54'	Stadium: Stade Vélodrome; Attendance: 58,874; Referee: Svein Oddvar Moen (Norway)

5 September 2016 2018 FIFA World Cup Qualification	Ukraine	1–1	Iceland	Kyiv, Ukraine
21:45	Yarmolenko 41'		Finnbogason 6'	Stadium: Olympic Stadium; Attendance: 0

6 October 2016 2018 FIFA World Cup Qualification	Turkey	2–2	Ukraine	Konya, Turkey
20:45	Tufan 45+1'; Çalhanoğlu 81' (pen.)		Yarmolenko 24' (pen.); Kravets 27'	Stadium: Torku Arena; Attendance: 42,000

9 October 2016 2018 FIFA World Cup Qualification	Ukraine	3–0	Kosovo	Kraków, Poland
18:00	Kravets 31'; Yarmolenko 81'; Rotan 87'	Report		Stadium: Marshal Józef Piłsudski Stadium; Referee: Kevin Blom

12 November 2016 2018 FIFA World Cup Qualification	Ukraine	1–0	Finland	Chornomorets Stadium, Odesa
20:45	Kravets 24'			Attendance: 26,482; Referee: Jorge Sousa (Portugal)

15 November 2016 Friendly	Ukraine	2–0	Serbia	Metalist Stadium, Kharkiv
21:00 (UTC+1)	Shakhov 38'; Yarmolenko 87' (pen.)	Report (FFU); Report (FAS)		Attendance: 30,000; Referee: Martin Strömbergsson (Sweden)

=== 2017 ===
24 March 2017 2018 FIFA World Cup Qualification	Croatia	1–0	Ukraine	Stadion Maksimir, Zagreb
20:45 (UTC+1)	Kalinić 38'	Report (FIFA); Report (UEFA)		Attendance: 27,351; Referee: Antonio Mateu Lahoz (Spain)

6 June 2017 Friendly (unofficial)	Ukraine	0–1	Malta	Liebenauer Stadium, Graz, Austria
19:00 (UTC+1)		Report (FFU); Report (MFA)	Z. Muscat 14'	Attendance: 500; Referee: Alexander Harkam (Austria)

11 June 2017 2018 FIFA World Cup Qualification	Finland	1–2	Ukraine	Tampere Stadium, Tampere
18:00 (UTC+1)	Pohjanpalo 72'	Report (FIFA); Report (UEFA)	Konoplyanka 51'; Besyedin 75'	Attendance: 8,723; Referee: Alon Yefet (Israel)

2 September 2017 2018 FIFA World Cup Qualification	Ukraine	2–0	Turkey	Metalist Stadium, Kharkiv
20:45 (21:45 UTC+3)	Yarmolenko 18', 42'	Report (FIFA); Report (UEFA)		Attendance: 36,796; Referee: David Fernández Borbalán (Spain)

5 September 2017 2018 FIFA World Cup Qualification	Iceland	2–0	Ukraine	Laugardalsvöllur, Reykjavík
20:45 (21:45 UTC+3)	G. Sigurðsson 47', 66'	Report (FIFA); Report (UEFA)		Attendance: 9,769; Referee: Willie Collum (Scotland)

6 October 2017 2018 FIFA World Cup Qualification	Kosovo	0–2	Ukraine	Loro Boriçi Stadium, Shkodër, Albania
20:45 (21:45 UTC+3)		Report (FIFA); Report (UEFA)	Paqarada 60' (o.g.); Yarmolenko 87'	Attendance: 1,261; Referee: Craig Pawson (England)

9 October 2017 2018 FIFA World Cup Qualification	Ukraine	0–2	Croatia	Olympic National Sports Complex, Kyiv
20:45 (21:45 UTC+3)		Report (FIFA); Report (UEFA)	Kramarić 62', 70'	Attendance: 60,200; Referee: Felix Brych (Germany)

10 November 2017 Friendly	Ukraine	2–1	Slovakia	Arena Lviv, Lviv
20:00 (UTC+1)	Yarmolenko 39'; Konoplyanka 54'	Report (FFU); Report (SFZ)	Štetina 10'	Attendance: 27,000; Referee: Andris Treimanis (Latvia)

=== 2018 ===
23 March 2018 Friendly	Ukraine	1–1	Saudi Arabia	Marbella, Spain
18:00 (UTC+1)	Kravets 32'	Report (FFU); Report (SAFF)	Al-Muwallad 38'	Stadium: Estadio Municipal; Attendance: 450; Referee: Alberto Undiano Mallenco (Spain)

27 March 2018 Kirin Challenge Cup 2018	Ukraine	2–1	Japan	Liège, Belgium
14:20 (UTC+1)	Rakitskyi 21'; Karavayev 69'	Report (FFU); Report (JFA)	Makino 41'	Stadium: Stade Maurice Dufrasne; Attendance: 2,529; Referee: Bart Vertenten (Belgium)

31 May 2018 Friendly	Morocco	0–0	Ukraine	Geneva, Switzerland
20:00 (UTC+2)		Report (FFU); Report (FRMF)		Stadium: Stade de Genève; Attendance: 8,000; Referee: Sandro Schärer (Switzerland)

3 June 2018 Friendly	Albania	1–4	Ukraine	Évian-les-Bains, France
16:00 (UTC+2)	Ndoj 89'	Report (FFU); Report (FSHF)	Konoplyanka 31', 90'; Yarmolenko 35', 45+1'	Stadium: Camille Fournier Stadium; Attendance: 600; Referee: Francois Letexier (France)

6 September 2018 2018–19 UEFA Nations League B	Czech Republic	1–2	Ukraine	Uherské Hradiště, Czech Republic
20:45 (20:45 UTC+2)	Schick 4'	Report (FFU); Report (FAČR)	Konoplyanka 45+1'; Zinchenko 90+3'	Stadium: Městský fotbalový stadion Miroslava Valenty; Attendance: 7,974; Referee: Anthony Taylor (England)

9 September 2018 2018–19 UEFA Nations League B	Ukraine	1–0	Slovakia	Lviv, Ukraine
15:00 (16:00 UTC+3)	Yarmolenko 80' (pen.)	Report (FFU); Report (SFZ)		Stadium: Arena Lviv; Attendance: 0 Referee: Anastasios Sidiropoulos (Greece)

10 October 2018 Friendly	Italy	1–1	Ukraine	Genoa, Italy
20:45 (21:45 UTC+3)	Bernardeschi 55'	Report (FFU); Report (FIGC)	Malinovskyi 62'	Stadium: Stadio Luigi Ferraris; Attendance: 12,000; Referee: Rade Obrenović (Slovenia)

16 October 2018 2018–19 UEFA Nations League B	Ukraine	1–0	Czech Republic	Kharkiv, Ukraine
20:45 (21:45 UTC+3)	Malinovskyi 43'	Report (FFU); Report (FAČR)		Stadium: Metalist Stadium; Attendance: 32,000; Referee: Gediminas Mažeika (Lithuania)

16 November 2018 2018–19 UEFA Nations League B	Slovakia	4–1	Ukraine	Trnava, Slovakia
20:45 (21:45 UTC+3)	Rusnák 6'; Kucka 26'; Zreľák 52'; Mak 61'	Report (FFU); Report (SFZ)	Konoplyanka 47'	Stadium: Štadión Antona Malatinského; Attendance: 9,764; Referee: Nikola Dabanović (Montenegro)

20 November 2018 Friendly	Turkey	0–0	Ukraine	Antalya, Turkey
19:30 (19:30UTC+2)		Report (FFU); Report (TFF)		Stadium: Antalya Arena; Referee: Genc Nuza (Kosovo)

=== 2019 ===
22 March 2019 UEFA Euro 2020 qualifying Group B	Portugal	0–0	Ukraine	Lisbon, Portugal
20:45 (21:45 UTC+3)		Report (FFU); Report (FPF)		Stadium: Estádio da Luz; Attendance: 58,355; Referee: Clément Turpin (France)

25 March 2019 UEFA Euro 2020 qualifying Group B	Luxembourg	1–2	Ukraine	Luxembourg, Luxembourg
20:45 (21:45 UTC+3)	Turpel 34'	Report (FFU); Report (FLF)	Tsyhankov 40'; Rodrigues 90+3' (o.g.)	Stadium: Stade Josy Barthel; Attendance: 4,653; Referee: Mattias Gestranius (Finland)

7 June 2019 UEFA Euro 2020 qualifying Group B	Ukraine	5–0	Serbia	Lviv, Ukraine
20:45	Tsyhankov 26', 28'; Konoplyanka 46', 75'; Yaremchuk 59'	Report (UAF); Report (FSS)		Stadium: Arena Lviv; Attendance: 34,915; Referee: Antonio Mateu Lahoz (Spain)

10 June 2019 UEFA Euro 2020 qualifying Group B	Ukraine	1–0	Luxembourg	Lviv, Ukraine
20:45 (21:45 UTC+3)	Yaremchuk 6'	Report (UAF); Report (FLF)		Stadium: Arena Lviv; Referee: Peter Kralović (Slovakia)

7 September 2019 UEFA Euro 2020 qualifying Group B	Lithuania	0–3	Ukraine	Vilnius, Lithuania
18:00 (19:00 UTC+3)		[Report (UAF)] [Report (LFF)]	Zinchenko 7'; Marlos 27'; Malinovskyi 62'	Stadium: LFF Stadium; Referee: Irfan Peljto (Bosnia and Herzegovina)

10 September 2019 Friendly	Ukraine	2–2	Nigeria	Dnipro, Ukraine
20:30	Zinchenko 78'; Yaremchuk 79'	[Report (UAF)] [Report ()]	Aribo 4'; Osimhen 34' (pen.)	Stadium: Dnipro-Arena; Referee: Paolo Valeri (Italy)

11 October 2019 UEFA Euro 2020 qualifying Group B	Ukraine	2–0	Lithuania	Kharkiv, Ukraine
20:45 (21:45 UTC+3)	Malinovskyi 29', 58'	[Report (UAF)] [Report (LFF)]		Stadium: Metalist Stadium; Referee: Harald Lechner (Austria)

14 October 2019 UEFA Euro 2020 qualifying Group B	Ukraine	2–1	Portugal	Kyiv, Ukraine
20:45 (21:45 UTC+3)	Yaremchuk 6'; Yarmolenko 27'	[Report (UAF)] [Report (FPF)]	Ronaldo 72' (pen.)	Stadium: NSK Olimpiyskiy; Attendance: 65,883; Referee: Anthony Taylor (England)

14 November 2019 Friendly	Ukraine	1–0	Estonia	Zaporizhia, Ukraine
19:00 (UTC+2)	Bezus 92+2'	[Report (UAF)] [Report ()]		Stadium: Slavutych-Arena; Referee: Juan Martínez Munuera (Spain)

17 November 2019 UEFA Euro 2020 qualifying Group B	Serbia	2–2	Ukraine	Belgrade, Serbia
15:00 (16:00 UTC+3)	Tadić 9' (pen.); Mitrović 56'	[Report (UAF)] [Report (FSS)]	Yaremchuk 33'; Besyedin 90+3'	Stadium: Red Star Stadium; Referee: Bobby Madden (Scotland)

== See also ==
- Ukraine national football team rosters
