= UEFA Euro 2020 qualifying =

Qualifier for UEFA Euro 2020

Tournament details
- Dates: 21 March 2019 – 12 November 2020
- Teams: 55

Tournament statistics
- Matches played: 262
- Goals scored: 826 (3.15 per match)
- Attendance: 5,225,403 (19,944 per match)
- Top scorer: (England) Harry Kane (12 goals)

The UEFA Euro 2020 qualifying tournament was a football competition that was played from March 2019 to November 2020 to determine the 24 UEFA member men's national teams that advanced to the UEFA Euro 2020 final tournament, intended to be played across Europe in June and July 2020 before the tournament was delayed by a year due to the COVID-19 pandemic. The competition was linked with the 2018–19 UEFA Nations League, giving countries a secondary route to qualify for the final tournament. For the first time since 1976, no team automatically qualified for the UEFA European Championship as the host country.

The national teams of all 55 UEFA member associations entered the qualifying process, with Kosovo taking part for the first time. The group stage draw took place at the Convention Centre Dublin, Ireland, on 2 December 2018.

== Qualified teams ==
Team qualified for UEFA Euro 2020 Team failed to qualify

| Team (Note: Italic indicates team from one of the eleven host associations.) | Qualified as | Qualified on | Previous appearances in tournament (Note: Bold indicates champion for that year. Italic indicates host for that year.) |
|---|---|---|---|
| Belgium | Group I winner | 10 October 2019 | 5 (1972, 1980, 1984, 2000, 2016) |
| Italy | Group J winner | 12 October 2019 | 9 (**1968**, 1980, 1988, 1996, 2000, 2004, 2008, 2012, 2016) |
| Russia (Note: From 1960 to 1988, Russia competed as the Soviet Union, and in 1992 as CIS.) | Group I runner-up | 13 October 2019 | 11 (**1960**, 1964, 1968, 1972, 1988, 1992, 1996, 2004, 2008, 2012, 2016) |
| Poland | Group G winner | 13 October 2019 | 3 (2008, 2012, 2016) |
| Ukraine | Group B winner | 14 October 2019 | 2 (2012, 2016) |
| Spain | Group F winner | 15 October 2019 | 10 (**1964**, 1980, 1984, 1988, 1996, 2000, 2004, **2008**, **2012**, 2016) |
| France | Group H winner | 14 November 2019 | 9 (1960, **1984**, 1992, 1996, **2000**, 2004, 2008, 2012, 2016) |
| Turkey | Group H runner-up | 14 November 2019 | 4 (1996, 2000, 2008, 2016) |
| England | Group A winner | 14 November 2019 | 9 (1968, 1980, 1988, 1992, 1996, 2000, 2004, 2012, 2016) |
| Czech Republic (Note: From 1960 to 1980, both the Czech Republic and Slovakia competed as Czechoslovakia.) | Group A runner-up | 14 November 2019 | 9 (1960, **1976**, 1980, 1996, 2000, 2004, 2008, 2012, 2016) |
| Finland | Group J runner-up | 15 November 2019 | 0 (debut) |
| Sweden | Group F runner-up | 15 November 2019 | 6 (1992, 2000, 2004, 2008, 2012, 2016) |
| Croatia | Group E winner | 16 November 2019 | 5 (1996, 2004, 2008, 2012, 2016) |
| Austria | Group G runner-up | 16 November 2019 | 2 (2008, 2016) |
| Netherlands | Group C runner-up | 16 November 2019 | 9 (1976, 1980, **1988**, 1992, 1996, 2000, 2004, 2008, 2012) |
| Germany (Note: From 1972 to 1988, Germany competed as West Germany.) | Group C winner | 16 November 2019 | 12 (**1972**, 1976, **1980**, 1984, 1988, 1992, **1996**, 2000, 2004, 2008, 2012, 2016) |
| Portugal | Group B runner-up | 17 November 2019 | 7 (1984, 1996, 2000, 2004, 2008, 2012, **2016**) |
| Switzerland | Group D winner | 18 November 2019 | 4 (1996, 2004, 2008, 2016) |
| Denmark | Group D runner-up | 18 November 2019 | 8 (1964, 1984, 1988, **1992**, 1996, 2000, 2004, 2012) |
| Wales | Group E runner-up | 19 November 2019 | 1 (2016) |
| North Macedonia | Play-off Path D winner | 12 November 2020 | 0 (debut) |
| Hungary | Play-off Path A winner | 12 November 2020 | 3 (1964, 1972, 2016) |
| Slovakia | Play-off Path B winner | 12 November 2020 | 4 (1960, **1976**, 1980, 2016) |
| Scotland | Play-off Path C winner | 12 November 2020 | 2 (1992, 1996) |

== Format ==
There was no automatic qualifying berth, and all 55 UEFA national teams, including the twelve national teams whose countries were selected to stage matches, had to compete in the qualifiers for the 24 places at the finals tournament. As the host cities were appointed by UEFA in September 2014, before qualifying, it was possible for the national teams from the host cities to fail to qualify for the finals tournament.

With the creation of the UEFA Nations League starting in 2018, the 2018–19 UEFA Nations League was linked with UEFA Euro qualifying, providing teams another chance to qualify for the tournament. The qualifying process guaranteed that at least one team from each division of the previous Nations League season would qualify for the final tournament (either directly or through the play-offs).

The main qualifying process began with the qualifying group stage in March 2019, instead of late 2018 immediately following the 2018 FIFA World Cup, and ended in November 2019. The qualifiers were played on double matchdays in March, June, September, October, and November 2019. As with the 2016 qualifying tournament, the group stage decided 20 of the 24 teams that advanced to the final tournament. Following the admission of Kosovo to UEFA in May 2016, it was announced that the 55 teams would be drawn into ten groups after the completion of the league phase of the 2018–19 UEFA Nations League, and the draw seeding would be based on the overall rankings of the 2018–19 UEFA Nations League. There were five groups of five teams, and five groups of six teams, with the four UEFA Nations League Finals participants guaranteed to be drawn into groups of five teams (so they could compete in the Nations League Finals in June 2019). The top two teams in each of the ten groups qualified for the final tournament.

Following the qualifying group stage, the qualifying play-offs took place to determine the remaining four teams for the final tournament. Unlike previous editions, the participants of the play-offs were not decided based on results from the qualifying group stage. Instead, sixteen teams were selected based entirely on their performance in the 2018–19 UEFA Nations League. These teams were divided into four paths, each containing four teams, with one team from each path qualifying for the final tournament. Each league had its own play-off path if at least four teams had not already qualified in the conventional qualifying group stage. The Nations League group winners automatically qualified for the play-off path of their league. If a group winner had already qualified through the qualifying group stage, they were replaced by the next best-ranked team in the same league. However, if there were not enough non-qualified teams in the same league, then the spot went to the next best team in the overall ranking. However, group winners could not face teams from a higher league.

Each play-off path featured two single-leg semi-finals, and one single-leg final. In the semi-finals, the best-ranked team hosted the lowest-ranked team, and the second-ranked team hosted the third-ranked team. The host of the final was drawn between the winners of the semi-final pairings. The four play-off path winners joined the twenty teams that had already qualified for the final tournament. The UEFA Executive Committee approved the use of the video assistant referee system for the play-offs during their meeting in Nyon, Switzerland on 4 December 2019, the first time the technology was used in the qualifying competition.

=== Tiebreakers for group ranking ===
If two or more teams were equal on points on completion of the group matches, the following tie-breaking criteria were applied:

1. Higher number of points obtained in the matches played among the teams in question;
2. Superior goal difference in matches played among the teams in question;
3. Higher number of goals scored in the matches played among the teams in question;
4. Higher number of goals scored away from home in the matches played among the teams in question;
5. If, after having applied criteria 1 to 4, teams still had an equal ranking, criteria 1 to 4 were reapplied exclusively to the matches between the teams in question to determine their final rankings. (Note: When there were two or more teams tied in points, criteria 1 to 4 were applied. After these criteria were applied, they may have defined the position of some of the teams involved, but not all of them. For example, if there is a three-way tie on points, the application of the first four criteria may only break the tie for one of the teams, leaving the other two teams still tied. In this case, the tiebreaking procedure is resumed, from the beginning, for those teams that are still tied.) If this procedure did not lead to a decision, criteria 6 to 10 applied;
6. Superior goal difference in all group matches;
7. Higher number of goals scored in all group matches;
8. Higher number of away goals scored in all group matches;
9. Higher number of wins in all group matches;
10. Higher number of away wins in all group matches;
11. Fair play conduct in all group matches (1 point for a single yellow card, 3 points for a red card as a consequence of two yellow cards, 3 points for a direct red card, 4 points for a yellow card followed by a direct red card);
12. Position in the UEFA Nations League overall ranking.

=== Criteria for overall ranking ===
To determine the overall rankings of the European Qualifiers, results against teams in sixth place were discarded and the following criteria were applied:

1. Position in the group;
2. Higher number of points;
3. Superior goal difference;
4. Higher number of goals scored;
5. Higher number of goals scored away from home;
6. Higher number of wins;
7. Higher number of wins away from home;
8. Fair play conduct (1 point for a single yellow card, 3 points for a red card as a consequence of two yellow cards, 3 points for a direct red card, 4 points for a yellow card followed by a direct red card);
9. Position in the UEFA Nations League overall ranking.

== Schedule ==
Below was the schedule of the UEFA Euro 2020 qualifying campaign.

Due to the COVID-19 pandemic in Europe, the qualifying play-offs, originally scheduled for 26 and 31 March 2020, were postponed by UEFA on 17 March 2020. Afterwards, UEFA tentatively scheduled for the matches to take place on 4 and 9 June 2020. However, the play-offs were later postponed indefinitely by UEFA on 1 April 2020. The scheduling of the play-offs was reviewed by the UEFA Executive Committee during their meeting on 17 June 2020. At the meeting, UEFA decided to stage the play-off semi-finals on 8 October 2020, and the finals on 12 November 2020. To facilitate this, an additional matchday was added to both international windows, allowing for triple-headers to be played in order to complete the league phase of the 2020–21 UEFA Nations League as scheduled. The changes to the International Match Calendar for October and November 2020 were approved by the FIFA Council on 25 June 2020.

| Stage | Matchday | Dates |
|---|---|---|
| Qualifying group stage | Matchday 1 | 21–23 March 2019 |
| Qualifying group stage | Matchday 2 | 24–26 March 2019 |
| Qualifying group stage | Matchday 3 | 7–8 June 2019 |
| Qualifying group stage | Matchday 4 | 10–11 June 2019 |
| Qualifying group stage | Matchday 5 | 5–7 September 2019 |
| Qualifying group stage | Matchday 6 | 8–10 September 2019 |
| Qualifying group stage | Matchday 7 | 10–12 October 2019 |
| Qualifying group stage | Matchday 8 | 13–15 October 2019 |
| Qualifying group stage | Matchday 9 | 14–16 November 2019 |
| Qualifying group stage | Matchday 10 | 17–19 November 2019 |
| Play-offs | Semi-finals | 8 October 2020 (Note: Originally scheduled for 26 March 2020, and later for 4 June 2020) |
| Play-offs | Finals | 12 November 2020 (Note: Originally scheduled for 31 March 2020, and later for 9 June 2020) |

The fixture list was confirmed by UEFA on 2 December 2018 following the draw.

== Draw ==
The qualifying group stage draw was held on 2 December 2018, 12:00 CET (11:00 local time), at the Convention Centre Dublin in Dublin, Ireland. The 55 teams were drawn into 10 groups: five groups of five teams (Groups A–E) and five groups of six teams (Groups F–J).

The teams were seeded based on the 2018–19 UEFA Nations League overall ranking. The four participants of the 2019 UEFA Nations League Finals in June 2019 were placed in a separate pot and drawn into Groups A–D which only had five teams so that they only had to play eight qualifying matches, leaving two free matchdays to play in Nations League Finals. The following restrictions were also applied with computer assistance:

- Host teams: In order to allow all 12 teams from the host associations to have a chance to qualify as group winners and runners-up, a maximum of two were placed in each group: Azerbaijan, Denmark, England, Germany, Hungary, Italy, Netherlands, Republic of Ireland, Romania, Russia, Scotland, Spain.
- Prohibited clashes: For political reasons, matches between following pairs of teams were considered prohibited clashes, unable to be drawn into the same group: Gibraltar / Spain, Kosovo / Bosnia and Herzegovina, Kosovo / Serbia. (Armenia / Azerbaijan and Russia / Ukraine were also identified as prohibited clashes, but the teams in these pairs were in the same pots for the draw.)
- Winter venues: A maximum of two teams whose venues were identified as having high or medium risk of severe winter conditions were placed in each group: Belarus, Estonia, Faroe Islands, Finland, Iceland, Latvia, Lithuania, Norway, Russia, Ukraine.
  - The three "hard winter venues" (Faroe Islands, Finland, Iceland) generally could not host games in March or November; the others played as few home matches as possible in March and November.
- Excessive travel: A maximum of one pair of teams identified with excessive travel distance in relation to other countries were placed in each group:
  - Azerbaijan: with Iceland, Portugal. (Gibraltar was also identified with Azerbaijan for excessive travel distance, but the teams were in the same pot for the draw.)
  - Iceland: with Armenia, Cyprus, Georgia, Israel.
  - Kazakhstan: with Andorra, England, France, Iceland, Malta, Northern Ireland, Portugal, Republic of Ireland, Scotland, Spain, Wales. (Faroe Islands and Gibraltar were also identified with Kazakhstan for excessive travel distance, but the teams were in the same pot for the draw.)

=== Seeding ===
The teams were seeded based on the November 2018 UEFA Nations League overall rankings. Teams in italics were final tournament hosts during the draw date. Teams in bold qualified to the final tournament.

UNL pot
| Team | Rank |
|---|---|
| **Switzerland** | 1 |
| **Portugal** (title holders) | 2 |
| **Netherlands** | 3 |
| **England** | 4 |

Pot 1
| Team | Rank |
|---|---|
| Belgium | 5 |
| France | 6 |
| Spain | 7 |
| Italy | 8 |
| Croatia | 9 |
| Poland | 10 |

Pot 4
| Team | Rank |
|---|---|
| **Hungary** | 31 |
| Romania | 32 |
| Greece | 33 |
| Albania | 34 |
| Montenegro | 35 |
| Cyprus | 36 |
| Estonia | 37 |
| Slovenia | 38 |
| Lithuania | 39 |
| Georgia | 40 |

Pot 2
| Team | Rank |
|---|---|
| **Germany** | 11 |
| Iceland | 12 |
| Bosnia and Herzegovina | 13 |
| **Ukraine** | 14 |
| **Denmark** | 15 |
| **Sweden** | 16 |
| **Russia** | 17 |
| **Austria** | 18 |
| **Wales** | 19 |
| **Czech Republic** | 20 |

Pot 5
| Team | Rank |
|---|---|
| **Macedonia** | 41 |
| Kosovo | 42 |
| Belarus | 43 |
| Luxembourg | 44 |
| Armenia | 45 |
| Azerbaijan | 46 |
| Kazakhstan | 47 |
| Moldova | 48 |
| Gibraltar | 49 |
| Faroe Islands | 50 |

Pot 3
| Team | Rank |
|---|---|
| **Slovakia** | 21 |
| **Turkey** | 22 |
| Republic of Ireland | 23 |
| Northern Ireland | 24 |
| **Scotland** | 25 |
| Norway | 26 |
| Serbia | 27 |
| **Finland** | 28 |
| Bulgaria | 29 |
| Israel | 30 |

Pot 6
| Team | Rank |
|---|---|
| Latvia | 51 |
| Liechtenstein | 52 |
| Andorra | 53 |
| Malta | 54 |
| San Marino | 55 |

== Summary ==
Group winners and runners-up qualified directly for UEFA Euro 2020
Teams advanced to the play-offs, selected based on their performance in the 2018–19 UEFA Nations League
Other teams were eliminated after the qualifying group stage

| Group A | Group B | Group C | Group D | Group E | Group F | Group G | Group H | Group I | Group J |
|---|---|---|---|---|---|---|---|---|---|
| England Czech Republic | Ukraine Portugal | Germany Netherlands | Switzerland Denmark | Croatia Wales | Spain Sweden | Poland Austria | France Turkey | Belgium Russia | Italy Finland |
| Kosovo | Serbia | Northern Ireland | Republic of Ireland | Slovakia | Norway | North Macedonia | Iceland | Scotland | Greece |
| Bulgaria | Luxembourg | Belarus | Georgia | Hungary | Romania | Slovenia | Albania | Cyprus | Bosnia and Herzegovina |
| Montenegro | Lithuania | Estonia | Gibraltar | Azerbaijan | Faroe Islands | Israel | Andorra | Kazakhstan | Armenia |
| | | | | | Malta | Latvia | Moldova | San Marino | Liechtenstein |

== Groups ==
Matches took place from 21 March to 19 November 2019.

=== Group A ===
| Pos | Team | Pld | W | D | L | GF | GA | GD | Pts | Qualification | (England) | (Czech Republic) | (Kosovo) | (Bulgaria) | (Montenegro) |
|---|---|---|---|---|---|---|---|---|---|---|---|---|---|---|---|
| 1 | England | 8 | 7 | 0 | 1 | 37 | 6 | +31 | 21 | Qualify for final tournament | — | 5–0 | 5–3 | 4–0 | 7–0 |
| 2 | Czech Republic | 8 | 5 | 0 | 3 | 13 | 11 | +2 | 15 | Qualify for final tournament | 2–1 | — | 2–1 | 2–1 | 3–0 |
| 3 | Kosovo | 8 | 3 | 2 | 3 | 13 | 16 | −3 | 11 | Advance to play-offs via Nations League | 0–4 | 2–1 | — | 1–1 | 2–0 |
| 4 | Bulgaria | 8 | 1 | 3 | 4 | 6 | 17 | −11 | 6 | Advance to play-offs via Nations League | 0–6 | 1–0 | 2–3 | — | 1–1 |
| 5 | Montenegro | 8 | 0 | 3 | 5 | 3 | 22 | −19 | 3 | | 1–5 | 0–3 | 1–1 | 0–0 | — |

Source: UEFA

=== Group B ===
| Pos | Team | Pld | W | D | L | GF | GA | GD | Pts | Qualification | (Ukraine) | (Portugal) | (Serbia) | (Luxembourg) | (Lithuania) |
|---|---|---|---|---|---|---|---|---|---|---|---|---|---|---|---|
| 1 | Ukraine | 8 | 6 | 2 | 0 | 17 | 4 | +13 | 20 | Qualify for final tournament | — | 2–1 | 5–0 | 1–0 | 2–0 |
| 2 | Portugal | 8 | 5 | 2 | 1 | 22 | 6 | +16 | 17 | Qualify for final tournament | 0–0 | — | 1–1 | 3–0 | 6–0 |
| 3 | Serbia | 8 | 4 | 2 | 2 | 17 | 17 | 0 | 14 | Advance to play-offs via Nations League | 2–2 | 2–4 | — | 3–2 | 4–1 |
| 4 | Luxembourg | 8 | 1 | 1 | 6 | 7 | 16 | −9 | 4 | | 1–2 | 0–2 | 1–3 | — | 2–1 |
| 5 | Lithuania | 8 | 0 | 1 | 7 | 5 | 25 | −20 | 1 | | 0–3 | 1–5 | 1–2 | 1–1 | — |

Source: UEFA

=== Group C ===
| Pos | Team | Pld | W | D | L | GF | GA | GD | Pts | Qualification | (Germany) | (Netherlands) | (Northern Ireland) | (Belarus) | (Estonia) |
|---|---|---|---|---|---|---|---|---|---|---|---|---|---|---|---|
| 1 | Germany | 8 | 7 | 0 | 1 | 30 | 7 | +23 | 21 | Qualify for final tournament | — | 2–4 | 6–1 | 4–0 | 8–0 |
| 2 | Netherlands | 8 | 6 | 1 | 1 | 24 | 7 | +17 | 19 | Qualify for final tournament | 2–3 | — | 3–1 | 4–0 | 5–0 |
| 3 | Northern Ireland | 8 | 4 | 1 | 3 | 9 | 13 | −4 | 13 | Advance to play-offs via Nations League | 0–2 | 0–0 | — | 2–1 | 2–0 |
| 4 | Belarus | 8 | 1 | 1 | 6 | 4 | 16 | −12 | 4 | Advance to play-offs via Nations League | 0–2 | 1–2 | 0–1 | — | 0–0 |
| 5 | Estonia | 8 | 0 | 1 | 7 | 2 | 26 | −24 | 1 | | 0–3 | 0–4 | 1–2 | 1–2 | — |

Source: UEFA

=== Group D ===
| Pos | Team | Pld | W | D | L | GF | GA | GD | Pts | Qualification | (Switzerland) | (Denmark) | (Republic of Ireland) | (Georgia (country)) | (Gibraltar) |
|---|---|---|---|---|---|---|---|---|---|---|---|---|---|---|---|
| 1 | Switzerland | 8 | 5 | 2 | 1 | 19 | 6 | +13 | 17 | Qualify for final tournament | — | 3–3 | 2–0 | 1–0 | 4–0 |
| 2 | Denmark | 8 | 4 | 4 | 0 | 23 | 6 | +17 | 16 | Qualify for final tournament | 1–0 | — | 1–1 | 5–1 | 6–0 |
| 3 | Republic of Ireland | 8 | 3 | 4 | 1 | 7 | 5 | +2 | 13 | Advance to play-offs via Nations League | 1–1 | 1–1 | — | 1–0 | 2–0 |
| 4 | Georgia | 8 | 2 | 2 | 4 | 7 | 11 | −4 | 8 | Advance to play-offs via Nations League | 0–2 | 0–0 | 0–0 | — | 3–0 |
| 5 | Gibraltar | 8 | 0 | 0 | 8 | 3 | 31 | −28 | 0 | | 1–6 | 0–6 | 0–1 | 2–3 | — |

Source: UEFA

=== Group E ===
| Pos | Team | Pld | W | D | L | GF | GA | GD | Pts | Qualification | (Croatia) | (Wales) | (Slovakia) | (Hungary) | (Azerbaijan) |
|---|---|---|---|---|---|---|---|---|---|---|---|---|---|---|---|
| 1 | Croatia | 8 | 5 | 2 | 1 | 17 | 7 | +10 | 17 | Qualify for final tournament | — | 2–1 | 3–1 | 3–0 | 2–1 |
| 2 | Wales | 8 | 4 | 2 | 2 | 10 | 6 | +4 | 14 | Qualify for final tournament | 1–1 | — | 1–0 | 2–0 | 2–1 |
| 3 | Slovakia | 8 | 4 | 1 | 3 | 13 | 11 | +2 | 13 | Advance to play-offs via Nations League | 0–4 | 1–1 | — | 2–0 | 2–0 |
| 4 | Hungary | 8 | 4 | 0 | 4 | 8 | 11 | −3 | 12 | Advance to play-offs via Nations League | 2–1 | 1–0 | 1–2 | — | 1–0 |
| 5 | Azerbaijan | 8 | 0 | 1 | 7 | 5 | 18 | −13 | 1 | | 1–1 | 0–2 | 1–5 | 1–3 | — |

Source: UEFA

=== Group F ===
| Pos | Team | Pld | W | D | L | GF | GA | GD | Pts | Qualification | (Spain) | (Sweden) | (Norway) | (Romania) | (Faroe Islands) | (Malta) |
|---|---|---|---|---|---|---|---|---|---|---|---|---|---|---|---|---|
| 1 | Spain | 10 | 8 | 2 | 0 | 31 | 5 | +26 | 26 | Qualify for final tournament | — | 3–0 | 2–1 | 5–0 | 4–0 | 7–0 |
| 2 | Sweden | 10 | 6 | 3 | 1 | 23 | 9 | +14 | 21 | Qualify for final tournament | 1–1 | — | 1–1 | 2–1 | 3–0 | 3–0 |
| 3 | Norway | 10 | 4 | 5 | 1 | 19 | 11 | +8 | 17 | Advance to play-offs via Nations League | 1–1 | 3–3 | — | 2–2 | 4–0 | 2–0 |
| 4 | Romania | 10 | 4 | 2 | 4 | 17 | 15 | +2 | 14 | Advance to play-offs via Nations League | 1–2 | 0–2 | 1–1 | — | 4–1 | 1–0 |
| 5 | Faroe Islands | 10 | 1 | 0 | 9 | 4 | 30 | −26 | 3 (Note: Tied on head-to-head points (3) and head-to-head goal difference (0). Head-to-head away goals: Faroe Islands 1, Malta 0.) | | 1–4 | 0–4 | 0–2 | 0–3 | — | 1–0 |
| 6 | Malta | 10 | 1 | 0 | 9 | 3 | 27 | −24 | 3 | | 0–2 | 0–4 | 1–2 | 0–4 | 2–1 | — |

Source: UEFA

=== Group G ===
| Pos | Team | Pld | W | D | L | GF | GA | GD | Pts | Qualification | (Poland) | (Austria) | (North Macedonia) | (Slovenia) | (Israel) | (Latvia) |
|---|---|---|---|---|---|---|---|---|---|---|---|---|---|---|---|---|
| 1 | Poland | 10 | 8 | 1 | 1 | 18 | 5 | +13 | 25 | Qualify for final tournament | — | 0–0 | 2–0 | 3–2 | 4–0 | 2–0 |
| 2 | Austria | 10 | 6 | 1 | 3 | 19 | 9 | +10 | 19 | Qualify for final tournament | 0–1 | — | 2–1 | 1–0 | 3–1 | 6–0 |
| 3 | North Macedonia | 10 | 4 | 2 | 4 | 12 | 13 | −1 | 14 (Note: Head-to-head points: North Macedonia 4, Slovenia 1.) | Advance to play-offs via Nations League | 0–1 | 1–4 | — | 2–1 | 1–0 | 3–1 |
| 4 | Slovenia | 10 | 4 | 2 | 4 | 16 | 11 | +5 | 14 | | 2–0 | 0–1 | 1–1 | — | 3–2 | 1–0 |
| 5 | Israel | 10 | 3 | 2 | 5 | 16 | 18 | −2 | 11 | Advance to play-offs via Nations League | 1–2 | 4–2 | 1–1 | 1–1 | — | 3–1 |
| 6 | Latvia | 10 | 1 | 0 | 9 | 3 | 28 | −25 | 3 | | 0–3 | 1–0 | 0–2 | 0–5 | 0–3 | — |

Source: UEFA

=== Group H ===
| Pos | Team | Pld | W | D | L | GF | GA | GD | Pts | Qualification | (France) | (Turkey) | (Iceland) | (Albania) | (Andorra) | (Moldova) |
|---|---|---|---|---|---|---|---|---|---|---|---|---|---|---|---|---|
| 1 | France | 10 | 8 | 1 | 1 | 25 | 6 | +19 | 25 | Qualify for final tournament | — | 1–1 | 4–0 | 4–1 | 3–0 | 2–1 |
| 2 | Turkey | 10 | 7 | 2 | 1 | 18 | 3 | +15 | 23 | Qualify for final tournament | 2–0 | — | 0–0 | 1–0 | 1–0 | 4–0 |
| 3 | Iceland | 10 | 6 | 1 | 3 | 14 | 11 | +3 | 19 | Advance to play-offs via Nations League | 0–1 | 2–1 | — | 1–0 | 2–0 | 3–0 |
| 4 | Albania | 10 | 4 | 1 | 5 | 16 | 14 | +2 | 13 | | 0–2 | 0–2 | 4–2 | — | 2–2 | 2–0 |
| 5 | Andorra | 10 | 1 | 1 | 8 | 3 | 20 | −17 | 4 | | 0–4 | 0–2 | 0–2 | 0–3 | — | 1–0 |
| 6 | Moldova | 10 | 1 | 0 | 9 | 4 | 26 | −22 | 3 | | 1–4 | 0–4 | 1–2 | 0–4 | 1–0 | — |

Source: UEFA

=== Group I ===
| Pos | Team | Pld | W | D | L | GF | GA | GD | Pts | Qualification | (Belgium) | (Russia) | (Scotland) | (Cyprus) | (Kazakhstan) | (San Marino) |
|---|---|---|---|---|---|---|---|---|---|---|---|---|---|---|---|---|
| 1 | Belgium | 10 | 10 | 0 | 0 | 40 | 3 | +37 | 30 | Qualify for final tournament | — | 3–1 | 3–0 | 6–1 | 3–0 | 9–0 |
| 2 | Russia | 10 | 8 | 0 | 2 | 33 | 8 | +25 | 24 | Qualify for final tournament | 1–4 | — | 4–0 | 1–0 | 1–0 | 9–0 |
| 3 | Scotland | 10 | 5 | 0 | 5 | 16 | 19 | −3 | 15 | Advance to play-offs via Nations League | 0–4 | 1–2 | — | 2–1 | 3–1 | 6–0 |
| 4 | Cyprus | 10 | 3 | 1 | 6 | 15 | 20 | −5 | 10 (Note: Head-to-head points: Cyprus 4, Kazakhstan 1.) | | 0–2 | 0–5 | 1–2 | — | 1–1 | 5–0 |
| 5 | Kazakhstan | 10 | 3 | 1 | 6 | 13 | 17 | −4 | 10 | | 0–2 | 0–4 | 3–0 | 1–2 | — | 4–0 |
| 6 | San Marino | 10 | 0 | 0 | 10 | 1 | 51 | −50 | 0 | | 0–4 | 0–5 | 0–2 | 0–4 | 1–3 | — |

Source: UEFA

=== Group J ===
| Pos | Team | Pld | W | D | L | GF | GA | GD | Pts | Qualification | (Italy) | (Finland) | (Greece) | (Bosnia and Herzegovina) | (Armenia) | (Liechtenstein) |
|---|---|---|---|---|---|---|---|---|---|---|---|---|---|---|---|---|
| 1 | Italy | 10 | 10 | 0 | 0 | 37 | 4 | +33 | 30 | Qualify for final tournament | — | 2–0 | 2–0 | 2–1 | 9–1 | 6–0 |
| 2 | Finland | 10 | 6 | 0 | 4 | 16 | 10 | +6 | 18 | Qualify for final tournament | 1–2 | — | 1–0 | 2–0 | 3–0 | 3–0 |
| 3 | Greece | 10 | 4 | 2 | 4 | 12 | 14 | −2 | 14 | | 0–3 | 2–1 | — | 2–1 | 2–3 | 1–1 |
| 4 | Bosnia and Herzegovina | 10 | 4 | 1 | 5 | 20 | 17 | +3 | 13 | Advance to play-offs via Nations League | 0–3 | 4–1 | 2–2 | — | 2–1 | 5–0 |
| 5 | Armenia | 10 | 3 | 1 | 6 | 14 | 25 | −11 | 10 | | 1–3 | 0–2 | 0–1 | 4–2 | — | 3–0 |
| 6 | Liechtenstein | 10 | 0 | 2 | 8 | 2 | 31 | −29 | 2 | | 0–5 | 0–2 | 0–2 | 0–3 | 1–1 | — |

Source: UEFA

== Play-offs ==
Teams that failed in the qualifying group stage could still qualify for the final tournament through the play-offs. Each league in the UEFA Nations League was allocated one of the four remaining final tournament spots. Four teams from each league that had not already qualified for the European Championship finals competed in the play-offs of their league. The play-off berths were first allocated to each Nations League group winner, and if any of the group winners had already qualified for the European Championship finals, then to the next best ranked team of the league, etc.

=== Team selection ===
The team selection process determined the 16 teams that competed in the play-offs based on a set of criteria that obeyed these principles:

- Each league formed a path with the four best-ranked teams not yet qualified.
- If one or more leagues had fewer than four non-qualifying teams, spots were taken by other eligible teams based on ranking.
- Group winners could not face teams from higher leagues.

Teams in bold advanced to the play-offs.

League A
| Rank | Team |
|---|---|
| 1 ^{GW} | Portugal |
| 2 ^{GW} | Netherlands |
| 3 ^{GW} | England |
| 4 ^{GW} | Switzerland |
| 5 | Belgium |
| 6 | France |
| 7 | Spain |
| 8 | Italy |
| 9 | Croatia |
| 10 | Poland |
| 11 | Germany |
| 12 | Iceland |

League B
| Rank | Team |
|---|---|
| 13 ^{GW} | Bosnia and Herzegovina |
| 14 ^{GW} | Ukraine |
| 15 ^{GW} | Denmark |
| 16 ^{GW} | Sweden |
| 17 | Russia |
| 18 | Austria |
| 19 | Wales |
| 20 | Czech Republic |
| 21 | Slovakia |
| 22 | Turkey |
| 23 | Republic of Ireland |
| 24 | Northern Ireland |

League C
| Rank | Team |
|---|---|
| 25 ^{GW} | Scotland |
| 26 ^{GW} | Norway |
| 27 ^{GW} | Serbia |
| 28 ^{GW} | Finland |
| 29 | Bulgaria |
| 30 | Israel |
| 31 | Hungary |
| 32 | Romania |
| 33 | Greece |
| 34 | Albania |
| 35 | Montenegro |
| 36 | Cyprus |
| 37 | Estonia |
| 38 | Slovenia |
| 39 | Lithuania |

League D
| Rank | Team |
|---|---|
| 40 ^{GW} | Georgia |
| 41 ^{GW} | North Macedonia |
| 42 ^{GW} | Kosovo |
| 43 ^{GW} | Belarus |
| 44 | Luxembourg |
| 45 | Armenia |
| 46 | Azerbaijan |
| 47 | Kazakhstan |
| 48 | Moldova |
| 49 | Gibraltar |
| 50 | Faroe Islands |
| 51 | Latvia |
| 52 | Liechtenstein |
| 53 | Andorra |
| 54 | Malta |
| 55 | San Marino |

Key

1. ^{GW} Nations League group winner
2. ^{H} UEFA Euro 2020 host at the time of the draw
3. Team advanced to play-offs
4. Team qualified directly to final tournament

=== Draw ===
The qualifying play-off draw took place on 22 November 2019, 12:00 CET, at the UEFA headquarters in Nyon, Switzerland. The draw followed the path formation rules to determine the play-off paths that the non-group winners would participate in. Four separate draws determining the host of the play-off final of each path also took place between the winners of the semi-final pairings (identified as semi-final 1 for 1 v 4, and semi-final 2 for 2 v 3).

Based on the 16 teams that advanced to the play-offs, the four play-off paths were formed following the path formation rules, starting with League D and working up to League A:

- As there were four group-winning teams from League D, they were all placed in Path D.
- As there were seven teams from League C (three group winners and four non-group winners), the three group winners were placed in Path C, while a draw decided which one of the four non-group winners was also placed in Path C.
- As there were four teams from League B (one group winner and three non-group winners), they were all placed in Path B.
- As there was only one non-group winning team from League A, it was placed in Path A. The three non-group winners from League C that were not drawn to Path C were then placed in Path A.

The following four non-group winners from League C (ordered by Nations League ranking) took part in the draw, with one being drawn into Path C, while the remaining three were allocated to Path A:

1. Bulgaria
2. Israel
3. Hungary
4. Romania

The team drawn into Path C occupied position C4, while the three teams drawn into Path A occupied positions A2, A3 and A4, following their Nations League ranking.

The following was the composition of the play-off paths:

Path A
| Rank | Team |
|---|---|
| 1 | Iceland |
| 2 | Bulgaria |
| 3 | Hungary |
| 4 | Romania |

Path B
| Rank | Team |
|---|---|
| 1 | Bosnia and Herzegovina |
| 2 | Slovakia |
| 3 | Republic of Ireland |
| 4 | Northern Ireland |

Path C
| Rank | Team |
|---|---|
| 1 | Scotland |
| 2 | Norway |
| 3 | Serbia |
| 4 | Israel |

Path D
| Rank | Team |
|---|---|
| 1 | Georgia |
| 2 | North Macedonia |
| 3 | Kosovo |
| 4 | Belarus |

Key

1. ^{H} UEFA Euro 2020 host at the time of the draw

The following semi-final winners were drawn to host the play-off final:

- Path A: Winner semi-final 2 (Bulgaria v Hungary)
- Path B: Winner semi-final 1 (Bosnia and Herzegovina v Northern Ireland)
- Path C: Winner semi-final 2 (Norway v Serbia)
- Path D: Winner semi-final 1 (Georgia v Belarus)

With host Scotland in Path C, and two other hosts Hungary and Romania to be drawn into Path A or C, it was not possible to prevent one of these paths from containing two host teams. Therefore, the winner of the path with two hosts had to be assigned to two final tournament groups.

=== Path A ===
| Home team | Score | Away team |
|---|---|---|
**Semi-finals**
| **Iceland** | 2–1 | Romania |
| Bulgaria | 1–3 | **Hungary** |
**Final**
| **Hungary** | 2–1 | Iceland |

=== Path B ===
| Home team | Score | Away team |
|---|---|---|
**Semi-finals**
| Bosnia and Herzegovina | 1–1 (a.e.t.) (3–4 p) | **Northern Ireland** |
| **Slovakia** | 0–0 (a.e.t.) (4–2 p) | Republic of Ireland |
**Final**
| Northern Ireland | 1–2 (a.e.t.) | **Slovakia** |

=== Path C ===
| Home team | Score | Away team |
|---|---|---|
**Semi-finals**
| **Scotland** | 0–0 (a.e.t.) (5–3 p) | Israel |
| Norway | 1–2 (a.e.t.) | **Serbia** |
**Final**
| Serbia | 1–1 (a.e.t.) (4–5 p) | **Scotland** |

=== Path D ===
| Home team | Score | Away team |
|---|---|---|
**Semi-finals**
| **Georgia** | 1–0 | Belarus |
| **North Macedonia** | 2–1 | Kosovo |
**Final**
| Georgia | 0–1 | **North Macedonia** |

== Goalscorers ==
There were 826 goals scored in 262 matches, for an average of 3.15 goals per match.

12 goals

- (England national football team) Harry Kane

11 goals

- (Israel national football team) Eran Zahavi
- (Portugal national football team) Cristiano Ronaldo

10 goals

- (Finland national football team) Teemu Pukki
- (Serbia national football team) Aleksandar Mitrović

9 goals

- (Russia national football team) Artem Dzyuba

8 goals

- (England national football team) Raheem Sterling
- (Germany national football team) Serge Gnabry
- (Netherlands national football team) Georginio Wijnaldum

7 goals

- (Belgium national football team) Romelu Lukaku
- (Scotland national football team) John McGinn

6 goals

- (Austria national football team) Marko Arnautović
- (France national football team) Olivier Giroud
- (Netherlands national football team) Memphis Depay
- (Poland national football team) Robert Lewandowski
- (Romania national football team) Claudiu Keșerü

5 goals

- (Belgium national football team) Eden Hazard
- (Denmark national football team) Christian Eriksen
- (Iceland national football team) Gylfi Sigurðsson
- (Norway national football team) Joshua King
- (Romania national football team) George Pușcaș
- (Russia national football team) Denis Cheryshev
- (Sweden men's national football team) Robin Quaison
- (Turkey national football team) Cenk Tosun

4 goals

- (Albania national football team) Sokol Cikalleshi
- (Belgium national football team) Michy Batshuayi
- (Belgium national football team) Kevin De Bruyne
- (Bosnia and Herzegovina national football team) Amer Gojak
- (Croatia national football team) Bruno Petković
- (Cyprus national football team) Ioannis Kousoulos
- (Cyprus national football team) Pieros Sotiriou
- (Czech Republic national football team) Patrik Schick
- (Denmark national football team) Christian Gytkjær
- (England national football team) Ross Barkley
- (Germany national football team) Leon Goretzka
- (Israel national football team) Mu'nas Dabbur
- (Italy national football team) Andrea Belotti
- (Kosovo national football team) Vedat Muriqi
- (North Macedonia national football team) Eljif Elmas
- (Norway national football team) Alexander Sørloth
- (Poland national football team) Krzysztof Piątek
- (Slovenia national football team) Josip Iličić
- (Spain national football team) Álvaro Morata
- (Spain national football team) Sergio Ramos
- (Spain national football team) Rodrigo
- (Ukraine national football team) Roman Yaremchuk

3 goals

- (Armenia national football team) Tigran Barseghyan
- (Armenia national football team) Aleksandre Karapetian
- (Armenia national football team) Henrikh Mkhitaryan
- (Belgium national football team) Christian Benteke
- (Bosnia and Herzegovina national football team) Edin Džeko
- (Bosnia and Herzegovina national football team) Armin Hodžić
- (Bosnia and Herzegovina national football team) Miralem Pjanić
- (Croatia national football team) Ivan Perišić
- (Croatia national football team) Nikola Vlašić
- (Denmark national football team) Martin Braithwaite
- (Denmark national football team) Robert Skov
- (England national football team) Marcus Rashford
- (France national football team) Kingsley Coman
- (France national football team) Antoine Griezmann
- (France national football team) Kylian Mbappé
- (Germany national football team) İlkay Gündoğan
- (Germany national football team) Toni Kroos
- (Germany national football team) Marco Reus
- (Germany national football team) Leroy Sané
- (Greece national football team) Kostas Fortounis
- (Hungary national football team) Willi Orbán
- (Iceland national football team) Birkir Bjarnason
- (Iceland national football team) Kolbeinn Sigþórsson
- (Italy national football team) Nicolò Barella
- (Italy national football team) Ciro Immobile
- (Italy national football team) Lorenzo Insigne
- (Italy national football team) Jorginho
- (Kazakhstan national football team) Baktiyar Zaynutdinov
- (Luxembourg national football team) Gerson Rodrigues
- (Luxembourg national football team) David Turpel
- (Northern Ireland national football team) Josh Magennis
- (Norway national football team) Bjørn Maars Johnsen
- (Portugal national football team) Bernardo Silva
- (Slovakia national football team) Róbert Boženík
- (Slovakia national football team) Marek Hamšík
- (Slovakia national football team) Juraj Kucka
- (Spain national football team) Paco Alcácer
- (Spain national football team) Gerard Moreno
- (Sweden men's national football team) Viktor Claesson
- (Sweden men's national football team) Alexander Isak
- (Switzerland national football team) Cedric Itten
- (Turkey national football team) Kaan Ayhan
- (Ukraine national football team) Ruslan Malinovskyi
- (Ukraine national football team) Viktor Tsyhankov

2 goals

- (Albania national football team) Bekim Balaj
- (Albania national football team) Rey Manaj
- (Andorra national football team) Cristian Martínez
- (Armenia national football team) Gevorg Ghazaryan
- (Austria national football team) Valentino Lazaro
- (Austria national football team) Marcel Sabitzer
- (Azerbaijan national football team) Mahir Emreli
- (Azerbaijan national football team) Ramil Sheydayev
- (Belgium national football team) Toby Alderweireld
- (Belgium national football team) Timothy Castagne
- (Belgium national football team) Nacer Chadli
- (Belgium national football team) Dries Mertens
- (Belgium national football team) Youri Tielemans
- (Bosnia and Herzegovina national football team) Rade Krunić
- (Bosnia and Herzegovina national football team) Edin Višća
- (Bulgaria national football team) Vasil Bozhikov
- (Croatia national football team) Luka Modrić
- (Cyprus national football team) Georgios Efrem
- (Cyprus national football team) Nicholas Ioannou
- (Denmark national football team) Kasper Dolberg
- (Denmark national football team) Yussuf Poulsen
- (England national football team) Jadon Sancho
- (Finland national football team) Fredrik Jensen
- (France national football team) Wissam Ben Yedder
- (France national football team) Raphaël Varane
- (Germany national football team) Timo Werner
- (Hungary national football team) Máté Pátkai
- (Hungary national football team) Dominik Szoboszlai
- (Iceland national football team) Ragnar Sigurðsson
- (Italy national football team) Federico Bernardeschi
- (Italy national football team) Moise Kean
- (Italy national football team) Fabio Quagliarella
- (Italy national football team) Alessio Romagnoli
- (Italy national football team) Marco Verratti
- (Italy national football team) Nicolò Zaniolo
- (Kazakhstan national football team) Aleksey Shchotkin
- (Kazakhstan national football team) Gafurzhan Suyumbayev
- (Kosovo national football team) Valon Berisha
- (Kosovo national football team) Milot Rashica
- (Lithuania national football team) Arvydas Novikovas
- (Montenegro national football team) Stefan Mugoša
- (Netherlands national football team) Ryan Babel
- (North Macedonia national football team) Enis Bardhi
- (North Macedonia national football team) Goran Pandev
- (Northern Ireland national football team) Niall McGinn
- (Portugal national football team) William Carvalho
- (Portugal national football team) Gonçalo Guedes
- (Romania national football team) Alexandru Mitriță
- (Russia national football team) Aleksandr Golovin
- (Russia national football team) Aleksei Ionov
- (Russia national football team) Magomed Ozdoyev
- (Russia national football team) Fyodor Smolov
- (Scotland national football team) Ryan Christie
- (Serbia national football team) Luka Jović
- (Serbia national football team) Sergej Milinković-Savić
- (Serbia national football team) Nemanja Radonjić
- (Serbia national football team) Dušan Tadić
- (Slovenia national football team) Domen Črnigoj
- (Slovenia national football team) Andraž Šporar
- (Slovenia national football team) Benjamin Verbič
- (Slovenia national football team) Miha Zajc
- (Spain national football team) Jesús Navas
- (Spain national football team) Mikel Oyarzabal
- (Sweden men's national football team) Marcus Berg
- (Sweden men's national football team) Sebastian Larsson
- (Switzerland national football team) Granit Xhaka
- (Switzerland national football team) Denis Zakaria
- (Turkey national football team) Enes Ünal
- (Ukraine national football team) Yevhen Konoplyanka
- (Wales national football team) Gareth Bale
- (Wales national football team) Kieffer Moore
- (Wales national football team) Aaron Ramsey

1 goal

- (Albania national football team) Amir Abrashi
- (Albania national football team) Keidi Bare
- (Albania national football team) Kastriot Dermaku
- (Albania national football team) Elseid Hysaj
- (Albania national football team) Ylber Ramadani
- (Albania national football team) Odise Roshi
- (Albania national football team) Armando Sadiku
- (Albania national football team) Lorenc Trashi
- (Andorra national football team) Marc Vales
- (Armenia national football team) Edgar Babayan
- (Armenia national football team) Hovhannes Hambardzumyan
- (Austria national football team) David Alaba
- (Austria national football team) Guido Burgstaller
- (Austria national football team) Michael Gregoritsch
- (Austria national football team) Martin Hinteregger
- (Austria national football team) Konrad Laimer
- (Austria national football team) Stefan Lainer
- (Austria national football team) Stefan Posch
- (Azerbaijan national football team) Tamkin Khalilzade
- (Belarus national football team) Stanislaw Drahun
- (Belarus national football team) Nikita Naumov
- (Belarus national football team) Maksim Skavysh
- (Belarus national football team) Ihar Stasevich
- (Belgium national football team) Yannick Carrasco
- (Belgium national football team) Thorgan Hazard
- (Belgium national football team) Thomas Meunier
- (Belgium national football team) Thomas Vermaelen
- (Belgium national football team) Yari Verschaeren
- (Bosnia and Herzegovina national football team) Eldar Ćivić
- (Bosnia and Herzegovina national football team) Izet Hajrović
- (Bosnia and Herzegovina national football team) Deni Milošević
- (Bulgaria national football team) Kristian Dimitrov
- (Bulgaria national football team) Ismail Isa
- (Bulgaria national football team) Todor Nedelev
- (Bulgaria national football team) Ivelin Popov
- (Bulgaria national football team) Georgi Yomov
- (Croatia national football team) Borna Barišić
- (Croatia national football team) Andrej Kramarić
- (Croatia national football team) Dejan Lovren
- (Croatia national football team) Ante Rebić
- (Cyprus national football team) Kostakis Artymatas
- (Cyprus national football team) Konstantinos Laifis
- (Cyprus national football team) Fotios Papoulis
- (Czech Republic national football team) Jakub Brabec
- (Czech Republic national football team) Ondřej Čelůstka
- (Czech Republic national football team) Vladimír Darida
- (Czech Republic national football team) Jakub Jankto
- (Czech Republic national football team) Alex Král
- (Czech Republic national football team) Lukáš Masopust
- (Czech Republic national football team) Zdeněk Ondrášek
- (Czech Republic national football team) Tomáš Souček
- (Denmark national football team) Henrik Dalsgaard
- (Denmark national football team) Thomas Delaney
- (Denmark national football team) Pierre-Emile Højbjerg
- (Denmark national football team) Mathias Jørgensen
- (England national football team) Tammy Abraham
- (England national football team) Michael Keane
- (England national football team) Mason Mount
- (England national football team) Alex Oxlade-Chamberlain
- (England national football team) Harry Winks
- (Estonia national football team) Erik Sorga
- (Estonia national football team) Konstantin Vassiljev
- (Faroe Islands national football team) Rógvi Baldvinsson
- (Faroe Islands national football team) Viljormur Davidsen
- (Faroe Islands national football team) Klæmint Olsen
- (Faroe Islands national football team) Jákup Thomsen
- (Finland national football team) Benjamin Källman
- (Finland national football team) Joel Pohjanpalo
- (Finland national football team) Pyry Soiri
- (Finland national football team) Jasse Tuominen
- (France national football team) Jonathan Ikoné
- (France national football team) Clément Lenglet
- (France national football team) Florian Thauvin
- (France national football team) Corentin Tolisso
- (France national football team) Samuel Umtiti
- (France national football team) Kurt Zouma
- (Georgia national football team) Vato Arveladze
- (Georgia national football team) Valerian Gvilia
- (Georgia national football team) Jaba Kankava
- (Georgia national football team) Giorgi Kharaishvili
- (Georgia national football team) Giorgi Kvilitaia
- (Georgia national football team) Saba Lobzhanidze
- (Georgia national football team) Tornike Okriashvili
- (Georgia national football team) Giorgi Papunashvili
- (Germany national football team) Julian Brandt
- (Germany national football team) Matthias Ginter
- (Germany national football team) Marcel Halstenberg
- (Germany national football team) Nico Schulz
- (Gibraltar national football team) Lee Casciaro
- (Gibraltar national football team) Roy Chipolina
- (Gibraltar national football team) Reece Styche
- (Greece national football team) Anastasios Donis
- (Greece national football team) Konstantinos Galanopoulos
- (Greece national football team) Dimitris Kolovos
- (Greece national football team) Dimitrios Limnios
- (Greece national football team) Petros Mantalos
- (Greece national football team) Georgios Masouras
- (Greece national football team) Vangelis Pavlidis
- (Greece national football team) Zeca
- (Hungary national football team) Dávid Holman
- (Hungary national football team) Zsolt Kalmár
- (Hungary national football team) Mihály Korhut
- (Hungary national football team) Loïc Négo
- (Hungary national football team) Nemanja Nikolić
- (Hungary national football team) Ádám Szalai
- (Iceland national football team) Jón Daði Böðvarsson
- (Iceland national football team) Jóhann Berg Guðmundsson
- (Iceland national football team) Viðar Örn Kjartansson
- (Iceland national football team) Arnór Sigurðsson
- (Israel national football team) Bibras Natkho
- (Italy national football team) Francesco Acerbi
- (Italy national football team) Leonardo Bonucci
- (Italy national football team) Federico Chiesa
- (Italy national football team) Stephan El Shaarawy
- (Italy national football team) Riccardo Orsolini
- (Italy national football team) Leonardo Pavoletti
- (Italy national football team) Lorenzo Pellegrini
- (Italy national football team) Stefano Sensi
- (Kazakhstan national football team) Maxim Fedin
- (Kazakhstan national football team) Bauyrzhan Islamkhan
- (Kazakhstan national football team) Islambek Kuat
- (Kazakhstan national football team) Yuriy Pertsukh
- (Kazakhstan national football team) Yan Vorogovskiy
- (Kazakhstan national football team) Temirlan Yerlanov
- (Kosovo national football team) Florent Hadergjonaj
- (Kosovo national football team) Atdhe Nuhiu
- (Kosovo national football team) Elba Rashani
- (Kosovo national football team) Amir Rrahmani
- (Kosovo national football team) Mërgim Vojvoda
- (Kosovo national football team) Arbër Zeneli
- (Latvia national football team) Vladimirs Kamešs
- (Latvia national football team) Mārcis Ošs
- (Liechtenstein national football team) Yanik Frick
- (Liechtenstein national football team) Dennis Salanović
- (Lithuania national football team) Vytautas Andriuškevičius
- (Lithuania national football team) Fedor Černych
- (Lithuania national football team) Donatas Kazlauskas
- (Luxembourg national football team) Leandro Barreiro
- (Malta national football team) Steve Borg
- (Malta national football team) Paul Fenech
- (Malta national football team) Kyrian Nwoko
- (Moldova national football team) Vladimir Ambros
- (Moldova national football team) Igor Armaș
- (Moldova national football team) Nicolae Milinceanu
- (Moldova national football team) Vadim Rață
- (Montenegro national football team) Marko Vešović
- (Netherlands national football team) Nathan Aké
- (Netherlands national football team) Myron Boadu
- (Netherlands national football team) Virgil van Dijk
- (Netherlands national football team) Frenkie de Jong
- (Netherlands national football team) Luuk de Jong
- (Netherlands national football team) Matthijs de Ligt
- (Netherlands national football team) Donyell Malen
- (North Macedonia national football team) Arijan Ademi
- (North Macedonia national football team) Ezgjan Alioski
- (North Macedonia national football team) Boban Nikolov
- (North Macedonia national football team) Vlatko Stojanovski
- (North Macedonia national football team) Darko Velkovski
- (Northern Ireland national football team) Steven Davis
- (Northern Ireland national football team) Jonny Evans
- (Northern Ireland national football team) Paddy McNair
- (Northern Ireland national football team) Michael Smith
- (Northern Ireland national football team) Conor Washington
- (Norway national football team) Sander Berge
- (Norway national football team) Tarik Elyounoussi
- (Norway national football team) Iver Fossum
- (Norway national football team) Stefan Johansen
- (Norway national football team) Ola Kamara
- (Norway national football team) Mathias Normann
- (Norway national football team) Martin Ødegaard
- (Norway national football team) Tore Reginiussen
- (Poland national football team) Przemysław Frankowski
- (Poland national football team) Kamil Glik
- (Poland national football team) Jacek Góralski
- (Poland national football team) Kamil Grosicki
- (Poland national football team) Damian Kądzior
- (Poland national football team) Grzegorz Krychowiak
- (Poland national football team) Arkadiusz Milik
- (Poland national football team) Sebastian Szymański
- (Portugal national football team) Danilo Pereira
- (Portugal national football team) Bruno Fernandes
- (Portugal national football team) Gonçalo Paciência
- (Portugal national football team) Pizzi
- (Republic of Ireland national football team) Robbie Brady
- (Republic of Ireland national football team) Matt Doherty
- (Republic of Ireland national football team) Shane Duffy
- (Republic of Ireland national football team) Jeff Hendrick
- (Republic of Ireland national football team) Conor Hourihane
- (Republic of Ireland national football team) David McGoldrick
- (Romania national football team) Florin Andone
- (Romania national football team) Alexandru Chipciu
- (Romania national football team) Ciprian Deac
- (Romania national football team) Dennis Man
- (Romania national football team) Alexandru Maxim
- (Russia national football team) Georgi Dzhikiya
- (Russia national football team) Mário Fernandes
- (Russia national football team) Nikolay Komlichenko
- (Russia national football team) Fyodor Kudryashov
- (Russia national football team) Daler Kuzyayev
- (Russia national football team) Aleksei Miranchuk
- (Russia national football team) Anton Miranchuk
- (Russia national football team) Sergei Petrov
- (San Marino national football team) Filippo Berardi
- (Scotland national football team) Stuart Armstrong
- (Scotland national football team) Oliver Burke
- (Scotland national football team) Stuart Findlay
- (Scotland national football team) Kenny McLean
- (Scotland national football team) Steven Naismith
- (Scotland national football team) Andrew Robertson
- (Scotland national football team) Johnny Russell
- (Scotland national football team) Lawrence Shankland
- (Serbia national football team) Adem Ljajić
- (Serbia national football team) Nikola Milenković
- (Slovakia national football team) Ondrej Duda
- (Slovakia national football team) Michal Ďuriš
- (Slovakia national football team) Dávid Hancko
- (Slovakia national football team) Stanislav Lobotka
- (Slovakia national football team) Róbert Mak
- (Slovakia national football team) Albert Rusnák
- (Slovenia national football team) Roman Bezjak
- (Slovenia national football team) Tim Matavž
- (Slovenia national football team) Aljaž Struna
- (Spain national football team) Santi Cazorla
- (Spain national football team) José Gayà
- (Spain national football team) Dani Olmo
- (Spain national football team) Fabián Ruiz
- (Spain national football team) Pablo Sarabia
- (Spain national football team) Saúl
- (Spain national football team) Pau Torres
- (Sweden men's national football team) Sebastian Andersson
- (Sweden men's national football team) Marcus Danielson
- (Sweden men's national football team) Emil Forsberg
- (Sweden men's national football team) John Guidetti
- (Sweden men's national football team) Victor Lindelöf
- (Sweden men's national football team) Mattias Svanberg
- (Switzerland national football team) Loris Benito
- (Switzerland national football team) Breel Embolo
- (Switzerland national football team) Christian Fassnacht
- (Switzerland national football team) Edimilson Fernandes
- (Switzerland national football team) Remo Freuler
- (Switzerland national football team) Mario Gavranović
- (Switzerland national football team) Admir Mehmedi
- (Switzerland national football team) Ricardo Rodriguez
- (Switzerland national football team) Fabian Schär
- (Switzerland national football team) Haris Seferović
- (Switzerland national football team) Rubén Vargas
- (Switzerland national football team) Steven Zuber
- (Turkey national football team) Hakan Çalhanoğlu
- (Turkey national football team) Hasan Ali Kaldırım
- (Turkey national football team) Dorukhan Toköz
- (Turkey national football team) Ozan Tufan
- (Turkey national football team) Deniz Türüç
- (Turkey national football team) Cengiz Ünder
- (Turkey national football team) Yusuf Yazıcı
- (Turkey national football team) Burak Yılmaz
- (Ukraine national football team) Artem Besyedin
- (Ukraine national football team) Marlos
- (Ukraine national football team) Andriy Yarmolenko
- (Ukraine national football team) Oleksandr Zinchenko
- (Wales national football team) David Brooks
- (Wales national football team) Daniel James
- (Wales national football team) Harry Wilson

1 own goal

- (Armenia national football team) Aram Ayrapetyan (against Italy)
- (Austria national football team) Martin Hinteregger (against North Macedonia)
- (Azerbaijan national football team) Pavel Pashayev (against Wales)
- (Bosnia and Herzegovina national football team) Adnan Kovačević (against Greece)
- (Bosnia and Herzegovina national football team) Stjepan Lončar (against Armenia)
- (Cyprus national football team) Kypros Christoforou (against Belgium)
- (Czech Republic national football team) Tomáš Kalas (against England)
- (Faroe Islands national football team) Teitur Gestsson (against Spain)
- (Germany national football team) Jonathan Tah (against Netherlands)
- (Gibraltar national football team) Joseph Chipolina (against Republic of Ireland)
- (Kazakhstan national football team) Abzal Beisebekov (against Russia)
- (Kosovo national football team) Benjamin Kololli (against North Macedonia)
- (Kosovo national football team) Mërgim Vojvoda (against England)
- (Latvia national football team) Pāvels Šteinbors (against Austria)
- (Latvia national football team) Igors Tarasovs (against Slovenia)
- (Liechtenstein national football team) Andreas Malin (against Bosnia and Herzegovina)
- (Luxembourg national football team) Gerson Rodrigues (against Ukraine)
- (Malta national football team) Andrei Agius (against Sweden)
- (Montenegro national football team) Boris Kopitović (against Czech Republic)
- (Montenegro national football team) Aleksandar Šofranac (against England)
- (North Macedonia national football team) Egzon Bejtulai (against Austria)
- (North Macedonia national football team) Darko Velkovski (against Latvia)
- (Norway national football team) Håvard Nordtveit (against Sweden)
- (Romania national football team) Adrian Rus (against Spain)
- (San Marino national football team) Cristian Brolli (against Belgium)
- (San Marino national football team) Michele Cevoli (against Russia)
- (Scotland national football team) Stephen O'Donnell (against Russia)
- (Slovakia national football team) Milan Škriniar (against Northern Ireland)
- (Wales national football team) James Lawrence (against Croatia)

== Overall ranking ==
The overall rankings were used for seeding in the final tournament draw. Results against sixth-placed teams were not considered in the ranking.

| Rnk | Grp | Team | Pld | W | D | L | GF | GA | GD | Pts | Allocation |
|---|---|---|---|---|---|---|---|---|---|---|---|
| 1 | I | Belgium | 8 | 8 | 0 | 0 | 27 | 3 | +24 | 24 | Draw pot 1 |
| 2 | J | Italy | 8 | 8 | 0 | 0 | 26 | 4 | +22 | 24 | Draw pot 1 |
| 3 | A | England | 8 | 7 | 0 | 1 | 37 | 6 | +31 | 21 | Draw pot 1 |
| 4 | C | Germany | 8 | 7 | 0 | 1 | 30 | 7 | +23 | 21 | Draw pot 1 |
| 5 | F | Spain | 8 | 6 | 2 | 0 | 22 | 5 | +17 | 20 | Draw pot 1 |
| 6 | B | Ukraine | 8 | 6 | 2 | 0 | 17 | 4 | +13 | 20 | Draw pot 1 |
| 7 | H | France | 8 | 6 | 1 | 1 | 19 | 4 | +15 | 19 | Draw pot 2 |
| 8 | G | Poland | 8 | 6 | 1 | 1 | 13 | 5 | +8 | 19 | Draw pot 2 |
| 9 | D | Switzerland | 8 | 5 | 2 | 1 | 19 | 6 | +13 | 17 | Draw pot 2 |
| 10 | E | Croatia | 8 | 5 | 2 | 1 | 17 | 7 | +10 | 17 | Draw pot 2 |
| 11 | C | Netherlands | 8 | 6 | 1 | 1 | 24 | 7 | +17 | 19 | Draw pot 2 |
| 12 | I | Russia | 8 | 6 | 0 | 2 | 19 | 8 | +11 | 18 | Draw pot 2 |
| 13 | B | Portugal | 8 | 5 | 2 | 1 | 22 | 6 | +16 | 17 | Draw pot 3 |
| 14 | H | Turkey | 8 | 5 | 2 | 1 | 10 | 3 | +7 | 17 | Draw pot 3 |
| 15 | D | Denmark | 8 | 4 | 4 | 0 | 23 | 6 | +17 | 16 | Draw pot 3 |
| 16 | G | Austria | 8 | 5 | 1 | 2 | 13 | 8 | +5 | 16 | Draw pot 3 |
| 17 | F | Sweden | 8 | 4 | 3 | 1 | 16 | 9 | +7 | 15 | Draw pot 3 |
| 18 | A | Czech Republic | 8 | 5 | 0 | 3 | 13 | 11 | +2 | 15 | Draw pot 3 |
| 19 | E | Wales | 8 | 4 | 2 | 2 | 10 | 6 | +4 | 14 | Draw pot 4 |
| 20 | J | Finland | 8 | 4 | 0 | 4 | 11 | 10 | +1 | 12 | Draw pot 4 |
| 21 | B | Serbia | 8 | 4 | 2 | 2 | 17 | 17 | 0 | 14 | |
| 22 | E | Slovakia | 8 | 4 | 1 | 3 | 13 | 11 | +2 | 13 | |
| 23 | D | Republic of Ireland | 8 | 3 | 4 | 1 | 7 | 5 | +2 | 13 | |
| 24 | H | Iceland | 8 | 4 | 1 | 3 | 9 | 10 | −1 | 13 | |
| 25 | C | Northern Ireland | 8 | 4 | 1 | 3 | 9 | 13 | −4 | 13 | |
| 26 | F | Norway | 8 | 2 | 5 | 1 | 15 | 10 | +5 | 11 | |
| 27 | A | Kosovo | 8 | 3 | 2 | 3 | 13 | 16 | −3 | 11 | |
| 28 | J | Greece | 8 | 3 | 1 | 4 | 9 | 13 | −4 | 10 | |
| 29 | I | Scotland | 8 | 3 | 0 | 5 | 8 | 19 | −11 | 9 | |
| 30 | G | North Macedonia | 8 | 2 | 2 | 4 | 7 | 12 | −5 | 8 | |
| 31 | E | Hungary | 8 | 4 | 0 | 4 | 8 | 11 | −3 | 12 | |
| 32 | G | Slovenia | 8 | 2 | 2 | 4 | 10 | 11 | −1 | 8 | |
| 33 | F | Romania | 8 | 2 | 2 | 4 | 12 | 15 | −3 | 8 | |
| 34 | D | Georgia | 8 | 2 | 2 | 4 | 7 | 11 | −4 | 8 | |
| 35 | H | Albania | 8 | 2 | 1 | 5 | 10 | 14 | −4 | 7 | |
| 36 | J | Bosnia and Herzegovina | 8 | 2 | 1 | 5 | 12 | 17 | −5 | 7 | |
| 37 | A | Bulgaria | 8 | 1 | 3 | 4 | 6 | 17 | −11 | 6 | |
| 38 | B | Luxembourg | 8 | 1 | 1 | 6 | 7 | 16 | −9 | 4 | |
| 39 | C | Belarus | 8 | 1 | 1 | 6 | 4 | 16 | −12 | 4 | |
| 40 | I | Cyprus | 8 | 1 | 1 | 6 | 6 | 20 | −14 | 4 | |
| 41 | J | Armenia | 8 | 2 | 0 | 6 | 10 | 24 | −14 | 6 | |
| 42 | G | Israel | 8 | 1 | 2 | 5 | 10 | 17 | −7 | 5 | |
| 43 | I | Kazakhstan | 8 | 1 | 1 | 6 | 6 | 16 | −10 | 4 | |
| 44 | A | Montenegro | 8 | 0 | 3 | 5 | 3 | 22 | −19 | 3 | |
| 45 | E | Azerbaijan | 8 | 0 | 1 | 7 | 5 | 18 | −13 | 1 | |
| 46 | H | Andorra | 8 | 0 | 1 | 7 | 2 | 19 | −17 | 1 | |
| 47 | B | Lithuania | 8 | 0 | 1 | 7 | 5 | 25 | −20 | 1 | |
| 48 | C | Estonia | 8 | 0 | 1 | 7 | 2 | 26 | −24 | 1 | |
| 49 | F | Faroe Islands | 8 | 0 | 0 | 8 | 2 | 28 | −26 | 0 | |
| 50 | D | Gibraltar | 8 | 0 | 0 | 8 | 3 | 31 | −28 | 0 | |
| 51 | H | Moldova | 10 | 1 | 0 | 9 | 4 | 26 | −22 | 3 | |
| 52 | F | Malta | 10 | 1 | 0 | 9 | 3 | 27 | −24 | 3 | |
| 53 | G | Latvia | 10 | 1 | 0 | 9 | 3 | 28 | −25 | 3 | |
| 54 | J | Liechtenstein | 10 | 0 | 2 | 8 | 2 | 31 | −29 | 2 | |
| 55 | I | San Marino | 10 | 0 | 0 | 10 | 1 | 51 | −50 | 0 | |

Source: UEFA
Rules for classification: Ranking criteria

== Team of the European Qualifiers ==
Following the completion of the qualifying group stage, UEFA released a "Team of the European Qualifiers" on 29 November 2019. The team featured 11 players based on accumulated scores from the FedEx Performance Zone player rankings, which was based on form from qualifying. Additional weighting was given for teams that played only eight matches.

| Goalkeeper | Defenders | Midfielders | Forwards |
|---|---|---|---|
| (Ukraine) Andriy Pyatov | (Iceland) Ragnar Sigurðsson (Spain) Sergio Ramos (Turkey) Merih Demiral | (Cyprus) Ioannis Kousoulos (Israel) Eran Zahavi (Netherlands) Georginio Wijnaldum (Portugal) Bernardo Silva | (England) Harry Kane (England) Raheem Sterling (Netherlands) Memphis Depay |
