= Vytas =

Vytas may refer to:

- Diminutive of Vytautas
  - Vytautas Andriuškevičius, commonly known as Vytas
  - Vytas Gašpuitis (born 1994), Lithuanian footballer
  - Aloyzas-Vytas Stankevicius, birth name of Alain Stanké
- Vytas Brenner (19 September 1946 – 18 March 2004), German-born Venezuelan musician
- Vytas Nagisetty (born 1971), Indian musician

== Fictional characters ==
- Vytas in 2016 film The Saint

== See also ==
- Vitas
