= UEFA Euro 2020 qualifying Group E =

Football tournament qualifying stage

Group E of UEFA Euro 2020 qualifying was one of the ten groups to decide which teams would qualify for the UEFA Euro 2020 finals tournament. Group E consisted of five teams: Azerbaijan, Croatia, Hungary, Slovakia and Wales, where they played against each other home-and-away in a round-robin format.

The top two teams, Croatia and Wales, qualified directly for the finals. Unlike previous editions, the participants of the play-offs were not decided based on results from the qualifying group stage, but instead based on their performance in the 2018–19 UEFA Nations League.

== Standings ==
Pos	Team	Pld	W	D	L	GF	GA	GD	Pts	Qualification	(Croatia)	(Wales)	(Slovakia)	(Hungary)	(Azerbaijan)
1	Croatia	8	5	2	1	17	7	+10	17	Qualify for final tournament	—	2–1	3–1	3–0	2–1
2	Wales	8	4	2	2	10	6	+4	14	Qualify for final tournament	1–1	—	1–0	2–0	2–1
3	Slovakia	8	4	1	3	13	11	+2	13	Advance to play-offs via Nations League	0–4	1–1	—	2–0	2–0
4	Hungary	8	4	0	4	8	11	−3	12	Advance to play-offs via Nations League	2–1	1–0	1–2	—	1–0
5	Azerbaijan	8	0	1	7	5	18	−13	1		1–1	0–2	1–5	1–3	—

Source: UEFA
Rules for classification: Qualification tiebreakers

== Matches ==
The fixtures were released by UEFA the same day as the draw, which was held on 2 December 2018 in Dublin. Times are CET/CEST, (Note: CET (UTC+1) for matches in March and November 2019, and CEST (UTC+2) for all other matches.) as listed by UEFA (local times, if different, are in parentheses).

21 March 2019
20:45

Croatia	2–1	Azerbaijan
Barišić 44'; Kramarić 79'	Report	Sheydayev 19'

Stadion Maksimir, Zagreb
Attendance: 23,146
Referee: Georgi Kabakov (Bulgaria)
21 March 2019
20:45

Slovakia	2–0	Hungary
Duda 42'; Rusnák 85'	Report

Anton Malatinský Stadium, Trnava
Attendance: 14,235
Referee: Vladislav Bezborodov (Russia)

24 March 2019
15:00 (14:00 UTC+0)

Wales	1–0	Slovakia
James 5'	Report

Cardiff City Stadium, Cardiff
Attendance: 31,617
Referee: Felix Zwayer (Germany)
24 March 2019
18:00

Hungary	2–1	Croatia
Szalai 34'; Pátkai 76'	Report	Rebić 13'

Groupama Arena, Budapest
Attendance: 19,400
Referee: Willie Collum (Scotland)

8 June 2019
15:00

Croatia	2–1	Wales
J. Lawrence 17' (o.g.); Perišić 48'	Report	Brooks 77'

Stadion Gradski vrt, Osijek
Attendance: 17,061
Referee: István Kovács (Romania)
8 June 2019
18:00 (20:00 UTC+4)

Azerbaijan	1–3	Hungary
Emreli 69'	Report	Orbán 18', 53'; Holman 71'

Bakcell Arena, Baku
Attendance: 10,450
Referee: Kevin Blom (Netherlands)

11 June 2019
18:00 (20:00 UTC+4)

Azerbaijan	1–5	Slovakia
Sheydayev 29'	Report	Lobotka 8'; Kucka 27'; Hamšík 30', 57'; Hancko 85'

Bakcell Arena, Baku
Attendance: 8,200
Referee: John Beaton (Scotland)
11 June 2019
20:45

Hungary	1–0	Wales
Pátkai 80'	Report

Groupama Arena, Budapest
Attendance: 18,350
Referee: Matej Jug (Slovenia)

6 September 2019
20:45

Slovakia	0–4	Croatia
	Report	Vlašić 45'; Perišić 46'; Petković 72'; Lovren 89'

Anton Malatinský Stadium, Trnava
Attendance: 18,098
Referee: Felix Brych (Germany)
6 September 2019
20:45 (19:45 UTC+1)

Wales	2–1	Azerbaijan
Pashayev 26' (o.g.); Bale 84'	Report	Emreli 59'

Cardiff City Stadium, Cardiff
Attendance: 28,385
Referee: Trustin Farrugia Cann (Malta)

9 September 2019
18:00 (20:00 UTC+4)

Azerbaijan	1–1	Croatia
Khalilzade 72'	Report	Modrić 11' (pen.)

Bakcell Arena, Baku
Attendance: 9,150
Referee: Sandro Schärer (Switzerland)
9 September 2019
20:45

Hungary	1–2	Slovakia
Szoboszlai 50'	Report	Mak 40'; Boženík 56'

Groupama Arena, Budapest
Attendance: 21,700
Referee: Antonio Mateu Lahoz (Spain)

10 October 2019
20:45

Croatia	3–0	Hungary
Modrić 5'; Petković 24', 42'	Report

Stadion Poljud, Split
Attendance: 32,110
Referee: Daniele Orsato (Italy)
10 October 2019
20:45

Slovakia	1–1	Wales
Kucka 53'	Report	Moore 25'

Anton Malatinský Stadium, Trnava
Attendance: 18,071
Referee: Carlos del Cerro Grande (Spain)

13 October 2019
18:00

Hungary	1–0	Azerbaijan
Korhut 10'	Report

Groupama Arena, Budapest
Attendance: 11,300
Referee: Dennis Higler (Netherlands)
13 October 2019
20:45 (19:45 UTC+1)

Wales	1–1	Croatia
Bale 45+4'	Report	Vlašić 9'

Cardiff City Stadium, Cardiff
Attendance: 31,745
Referee: Björn Kuipers (Netherlands)

16 November 2019
18:00 (21:00 UTC+4)

Azerbaijan	0–2	Wales
	Report	Moore 10'; Wilson 34'

Bakcell Arena, Baku
Attendance: 8,622
Referee: Deniz Aytekin (Germany)
16 November 2019
20:45

Croatia	3–1	Slovakia
Vlašić 56'; Petković 60'; Perišić 74'	Report	Boženík 32'

Stadion Rujevica, Rijeka
Attendance: 8,212
Referee: Clément Turpin (France)

19 November 2019
20:45

Slovakia	2–0	Azerbaijan
Boženík 19'; Hamšík 86'	Report

Anton Malatinský Stadium, Trnava
Attendance: 7,825
Referee: Serhiy Boyko (Ukraine)
19 November 2019
20:45 (19:45 UTC+0)

Wales	2–0	Hungary
Ramsey 15', 47'	Report

Cardiff City Stadium, Cardiff
Attendance: 31,762
Referee: Ovidiu Hațegan (Romania)

== Goalscorers ==
There were 53 goals scored in 20 matches, for an average of 2.65 goals per match.

4 goals

- (Croatia national football team) Bruno Petković

3 goals

- (Croatia national football team) Ivan Perišić
- (Croatia national football team) Nikola Vlašić
- (Slovakia national football team) Róbert Boženík
- (Slovakia national football team) Marek Hamšík

2 goals

- (Azerbaijan national football team) Mahir Emreli
- (Azerbaijan national football team) Ramil Sheydayev
- (Croatia national football team) Luka Modrić
- (Hungary national football team) Willi Orbán
- (Hungary national football team) Máté Pátkai
- (Slovakia national football team) Juraj Kucka
- (Wales national football team) Gareth Bale
- (Wales national football team) Kieffer Moore
- (Wales national football team) Aaron Ramsey

1 goal

- (Azerbaijan national football team) Tamkin Khalilzade
- (Croatia national football team) Borna Barišić
- (Croatia national football team) Andrej Kramarić
- (Croatia national football team) Dejan Lovren
- (Croatia national football team) Ante Rebić
- (Hungary national football team) Dávid Holman
- (Hungary national football team) Mihály Korhut
- (Hungary national football team) Ádám Szalai
- (Hungary national football team) Dominik Szoboszlai
- (Slovakia national football team) Ondrej Duda
- (Slovakia national football team) Dávid Hancko
- (Slovakia national football team) Stanislav Lobotka
- (Slovakia national football team) Róbert Mak
- (Slovakia national football team) Albert Rusnák
- (Wales national football team) David Brooks
- (Wales national football team) Daniel James
- (Wales national football team) Harry Wilson

1 own goal

- (Azerbaijan national football team) Pavel Pashayev (against Wales)
- (Wales national football team) James Lawrence (against Croatia)

== Discipline ==
A player was automatically suspended for the next match for the following offences:

- Receiving a red card (red card suspensions could be extended for serious offences)
- Receiving three yellow cards in three different matches, as well as after fifth and any subsequent yellow card (yellow card suspensions were carried forward to the play-offs, but not the finals or any other future international matches)

The following suspensions were served during the qualifying matches:

Team	Player	Offence(s)	Suspended for match(es)
Azerbaijan	Anton Krivotsyuk	(yellow card) vs Slovakia (11 June 2019); (yellow card) vs Wales (6 September 2019); (yellow card) vs Croatia (9 September 2019)	vs Hungary (13 October 2019)
Azerbaijan	Maksim Medvedev	(yellow card) vs Croatia (21 March 2019); (yellow card) vs Hungary (8 June 2019); (yellow card) vs Croatia (9 September 2019)	vs Hungary (13 October 2019)
Azerbaijan	Dimitrij Nazarov	(yellow card) vs Hungary (8 June 2019); (yellow card) vs Wales (6 September 2019); (yellow card) vs Croatia (9 September 2019)	vs Hungary (13 October 2019)
Croatia	Marcelo Brozović	(yellow card) vs Wales (8 June 2019); (yellow card) vs Azerbaijan (9 September 2019); (yellow card) vs Hungary (10 October 2019)	vs Wales (13 October 2019)
Croatia	Dejan Lovren	Insulting behaviour vs Spain in 2018–19 UEFA Nations League (15 November 2018)	vs Azerbaijan (21 March 2019)
Croatia	Dejan Lovren	(yellow card) vs Hungary (24 March 2019); (yellow card) vs Wales (8 June 2019); (yellow card) vs Wales (13 October 2019)	vs Slovakia (16 November 2019)
Croatia	Domagoj Vida	(yellow card) vs Wales (8 June 2019); (yellow card) vs Hungary (10 October 2019); (yellow card) vs Wales (13 October 2019)	vs Slovakia (16 November 2019)
Hungary	Botond Baráth	(yellow card) (yellow-red card) vs Slovakia (9 September 2019)	vs Croatia (10 October 2019)
Hungary	László Kleinheisler	(yellow card) (yellow-red card) vs Croatia (10 October 2019)	vs Azerbaijan (13 October 2019)
Hungary	Mihály Korhut	(yellow card) vs Slovakia (21 March 2019); (yellow card) vs Wales (11 June 2019); (yellow card) vs Azerbaijan (13 October 2019)	vs Wales (19 November 2019)
Hungary	Ádám Nagy	(yellow card) vs Slovakia (21 March 2019); (yellow card) vs Wales (11 June 2019); (yellow card) vs Slovakia (9 September 2019)	vs Croatia (10 October 2019)
Slovakia	Norbert Gyömbér	(yellow card) (yellow-red card) vs Wales (10 October 2019)	vs Croatia (16 November 2019)
Slovakia	Róbert Mak	(yellow card) (yellow-red card) vs Croatia (16 November 2019)	vs Azerbaijan (19 November 2019)
Slovakia	Denis Vavro	(yellow card) vs Hungary (21 March 2019); (yellow card) vs Wales (24 March 2019); (yellow card) vs Hungary (9 September 2019)	vs Wales (10 October 2019)
Wales	Joe Allen	(yellow card) vs Slovakia (24 March 2019); (yellow card) vs Azerbaijan (6 September 2019); (yellow card) vs Croatia (13 October 2019)	vs Azerbaijan (16 November 2019)
