= Witold =

Witold is a masculine Polish given name. This name derives from the Lithuanian “Vytautas” composed of two elements: “vyti” (chase) plus “tauta” (the people), but It is also possible that it is a name of Germanic origin which means "ruling the forest". Notable people with the name include:

- Vytautas (c. 1350–1430) (Polish: Witold Kiejstutowicz, Witold Aleksander or Witold Wielki), ruler of the Grand Duchy of Lithuania, prince of Grodno and prince of Lutsk
- Witold, nom de guerre used by Jan Karski (1914-2000), Polish resistance fighter and professor
- Witold Abramowicz (politician) (1874–1940/1941), Lithuanian politician
- Witold Abramowicz (scientist), Polish scientist
- Witold Balcerowski (1935–2001), Polish chess player
- Witold Baran (1939–2020), Polish middle-distance runner
- Witold Conti (1908–1944), Polish film actor
- Witold Czartoryski (1824–1865), Polish Duke of Klewán and Zuków
- Witold Leon Czartoryski (1864–1945), Polish noble
- Witold Gerutto (1912–1973), Polish athlete
- Witold Gombrowicz (1904–1969), Polish novelist and dramatist
- Witold Hurewicz (1904–1956), Polish mathematician
- Witold Kiełtyka (1984–2007), Polish drummer, a founding member of the death metal band Decapitated
- Witold Kieżun (1922–2021) Polish economist, participant in the Warsaw Uprising and prisoner in the Soviet gulag
- Witold Lutosławski (1913–1994), Polish composer and conductor
- Witold Małcużyński (1914–1977), Polish pianist
- Witold Mańczak (1924–2016), Polish linguist
- Witold Mroziewski (born 1966), Polish-American Roman Catholic Auxiliary Bishop of Brooklyn
- Witold Pahl (born 1961), Polish politician
- Witold Pilecki (1901–1948), Polish World War II cavalry officer, intelligence agent and resistance leader, co-founder of the Secret Polish Army resistance movement
- Witold Pruszkowski (1846–1896), Polish painter
- Witold Roter (1932–2015), Polish mathematician
- Witold Rowicki (1914–1989), Polish orchestra conductor
- Witold Rybczynski (born 1943), Canadian-American architect, professor and writer
- Witold Skupień (born 1989), Polish Paralympic cross-country skier
- Witold Szabłowski (born 1980), Polish journalist and author
- Witold Szyguła (1940–2003), Polish international football goalkeeper and manager
- Witold Tomczak (1957–2025), Polish politician
- Witold Urbanowicz (1908–1996), second highest-scoring Polish fighter ace of the Second World War
- Witold Wojtkiewicz (1879–1909), Polish painter
- Witold Zacharewicz (1914–1943), Polish film actor executed for aiding Jews during the Holocaust
- Witold Zagórski (1930–2016), Polish basketball player and coach
- Witold Zawadowski (1888–1980), Polish radiologist
- Witold Ziaja (1940–2025), Polish field hockey player
