= Vytautas (disambiguation) =

Vytautas (c. 1350–1430) was a Lithuanian medieval king, Grand Duke, Prince of Hrodna and Prince of Lutsk.

Vytautas may also refer to:

- Vytautas (given name)
- Vytautas Magnus University, a public university in Kaunas, Lithuania founded in 1922
- Vytautas the Great Bridge, a bridge in Kaunas, Lithuania that crosses the Nemunas River
- Vytautas' the Great Church, a Roman Catholic church in Kaunas, Lithuania consecrated in 1400
- Vytautas the Great War Museum, a museum in Kaunas, Lithuania opened in 1936
- BC Vytautas, basketball team from Prienai, Lithuania
