= UEFA Euro 2020 qualifying Group B =

Football tournament qualifying stage

Group B of UEFA Euro 2020 qualifying was one of the ten groups to decide which teams would qualify for the UEFA Euro 2020 finals tournament. Group B consisted of five teams: Lithuania, Luxembourg, Portugal (the title holders), Serbia and Ukraine, where they played against each other home-and-away in a round-robin format.

The top two teams, Ukraine and Portugal, qualified directly for the finals. Unlike previous editions, the participants of the play-offs were not decided based on results from the qualifying group stage, but instead based on their performance in the 2018–19 UEFA Nations League.

== Standings ==
Pos	Team	Pld	W	D	L	GF	GA	GD	Pts	Qualification	(Ukraine)	(Portugal)	(Serbia)	(Luxembourg)	(Lithuania)
1	Ukraine	8	6	2	0	17	4	+13	20	Qualify for final tournament	—	2–1	5–0	1–0	2–0
2	Portugal	8	5	2	1	22	6	+16	17	Qualify for final tournament	0–0	—	1–1	3–0	6–0
3	Serbia	8	4	2	2	17	17	0	14	Advance to play-offs via Nations League	2–2	2–4	—	3–2	4–1
4	Luxembourg	8	1	1	6	7	16	−9	4		1–2	0–2	1–3	—	2–1
5	Lithuania	8	0	1	7	5	25	−20	1		0–3	1–5	1–2	1–1	—

Source: UEFA
Rules for classification: Qualification tiebreakers

== Matches ==
The fixtures were released by UEFA the same day as the draw, which was held on 2 December 2018 in Dublin. Times are CET/CEST, (Note: CET (UTC+1) for matches in March and November 2019, and CEST (UTC+2) for all other matches.) as listed by UEFA (local times, if different, are in parentheses).

22 March 2019
20:45

Luxembourg	2–1	Lithuania
Barreiro 45'; Rodrigues 55'	Report	Černych 14'

Stade Josy Barthel, Luxembourg City
Attendance: 3,353
Referee: Roi Reinshreiber (Israel)
22 March 2019
20:45 (19:45 UTC+0)

Portugal	0–0	Ukraine
	Report

Estádio da Luz, Lisbon
Attendance: 58,355
Referee: Clément Turpin (France)

25 March 2019
20:45

Luxembourg	1–2	Ukraine
Turpel 34'	Report	Tsyhankov 40'; Rodrigues 90+3' (o.g.)

Stade Josy Barthel, Luxembourg City
Attendance: 4,653
Referee: Mattias Gestranius (Finland)
25 March 2019
20:45 (19:45 UTC+0)

Portugal	1–1	Serbia
Pereira 42'	Report	Tadić 7' (pen.)

Estádio da Luz, Lisbon
Attendance: 50,342
Referee: Szymon Marciniak (Poland)

7 June 2019
20:45 (21:45 UTC+3)

Lithuania	1–1	Luxembourg
Novikovas 74'	Report	Rodrigues 21'

LFF Stadium, Vilnius
Attendance: 3,263
Referee: Ádám Farkas (Hungary)
7 June 2019
20:45 (21:45 UTC+3)

Ukraine	5–0	Serbia
Tsyhankov 26', 27'; Konoplyanka 46', 75'; Yaremchuk 58'	Report

Arena Lviv, Lviv
Attendance: 34,700
Referee: Antonio Mateu Lahoz (Spain)

10 June 2019
20:45

Serbia	4–1	Lithuania
A. Mitrović 20', 34'; Jović 35'; Ljajić 90+2'	Report	Novikovas 71' (pen.)

Red Star Stadium, Belgrade
Attendance: 52 (Note: Serbia were sanctioned by UEFA to play one home match (against Lithuania on 10 June 2019) without spectators for racist behaviour in their home match against Montenegro.)
Referee: Adrien Jaccottet (Switzerland)
10 June 2019
20:45 (21:45 UTC+3)

Ukraine	1–0	Luxembourg
Yaremchuk 6'	Report

Arena Lviv, Lviv
Attendance: 34,700
Referee: Peter Kralović (Slovakia)

7 September 2019
18:00 (19:00 UTC+3)

Lithuania	0–3	Ukraine
	Report	Zinchenko 7'; Marlos 27'; Malinovskyi 62'

LFF Stadium, Vilnius
Attendance: 5,067
Referee: Irfan Peljto (Bosnia and Herzegovina)
7 September 2019
20:45

Serbia	2–4	Portugal
Milenković 68'; A. Mitrović 85'	Report	Carvalho 42'; Guedes 58'; Ronaldo 80'; B. Silva 86'

Red Star Stadium, Belgrade
Attendance: 39,839
Referee: Cüneyt Çakır (Turkey)

10 September 2019
20:45 (21:45 UTC+3)

Lithuania	1–5	Portugal
Andriuškevičius 28'	Report	Ronaldo 7' (pen.), 62', 65', 76'; Carvalho 90+2'

LFF Stadium, Vilnius
Attendance: 5,067
Referee: Bas Nijhuis (Netherlands)
10 September 2019
20:45

Luxembourg	1–3	Serbia
Turpel 66'	Report	A. Mitrović 36', 78'; Radonjić 55'

Stade Josy Barthel, Luxembourg City
Attendance: 6,373
Referee: Orel Grinfeld (Israel)

11 October 2019
20:45 (19:45 UTC+1)

Portugal	3–0	Luxembourg
B. Silva 16'; Ronaldo 65'; Guedes 89'	Report

Estádio José Alvalade, Lisbon
Attendance: 47,305
Referee: Daniel Stefański (Poland)
11 October 2019
20:45 (21:45 UTC+3)

Ukraine	2–0	Lithuania
Malinovskyi 29', 58'	Report

Metalist Stadium, Kharkiv
Attendance: 32,500
Referee: Harald Lechner (Austria)

14 October 2019
20:45 (21:45 UTC+3)

Lithuania	1–2	Serbia
Kazlauskas 79'	Report	A. Mitrović 49', 53'

LFF Stadium, Vilnius
Attendance: 2,787
Referee: Paweł Raczkowski (Poland)
14 October 2019
20:45 (21:45 UTC+3)

Ukraine	2–1	Portugal
Yaremchuk 6'; Yarmolenko 27'	Report	Ronaldo 72' (pen.)

NSC Olimpiyskiy Stadium, Kyiv
Attendance: 65,883
Referee: Anthony Taylor (England)

14 November 2019
20:45 (19:45 UTC+0)

Portugal	6–0	Lithuania
Ronaldo 7' (pen.), 22', 65'; Pizzi 52'; Paciência 56'; B. Silva 63'	Report

Estádio Algarve, Faro/Loulé
Attendance: 18,534
Referee: Ruddy Buquet (France)
14 November 2019
20:45

Serbia	3–2	Luxembourg
A. Mitrović 11', 43'; Radonjić 70'	Report	Rodrigues 54'; Turpel 75'

Red Star Stadium, Belgrade
Attendance: 1,560 (Note: Serbia were sanctioned by UEFA to play one home match (against Luxembourg on 14 November 2019) without spectators for racist behaviour in their home match against Portugal.)
Referee: Serdar Gözübüyük (Netherlands)

17 November 2019
15:00

Luxembourg	0–2	Portugal
	Report	Fernandes 39'; Ronaldo 86'

Stade Josy Barthel, Luxembourg City
Attendance: 8,000
Referee: Jesús Gil Manzano (Spain)
17 November 2019
15:00

Serbia	2–2	Ukraine
Tadić 9' (pen.); A. Mitrović 56'	Report	Yaremchuk 32'; Besyedin 90+3'

Red Star Stadium, Belgrade
Attendance: 4,457
Referee: Bobby Madden (Scotland)

== Goalscorers ==
There were 68 goals scored in 20 matches, for an average of 3.4 goals per match.

11 goals

- (Portugal national football team) Cristiano Ronaldo

10 goals

- (Serbia national football team) Aleksandar Mitrović

4 goals

- (Ukraine national football team) Roman Yaremchuk

3 goals

- (Luxembourg national football team) Gerson Rodrigues
- (Luxembourg national football team) David Turpel
- (Portugal national football team) Bernardo Silva
- (Ukraine national football team) Ruslan Malinovskyi
- (Ukraine national football team) Viktor Tsyhankov

2 goals

- (Lithuania national football team) Arvydas Novikovas
- (Portugal national football team) William Carvalho
- (Portugal national football team) Gonçalo Guedes
- (Serbia national football team) Nemanja Radonjić
- (Serbia national football team) Dušan Tadić
- (Ukraine national football team) Yevhen Konoplyanka

1 goal

- (Lithuania national football team) Vytautas Andriuškevičius
- (Lithuania national football team) Fedor Černych
- (Lithuania national football team) Donatas Kazlauskas
- (Luxembourg national football team) Leandro Barreiro
- (Portugal national football team) Danilo Pereira
- (Portugal national football team) Bruno Fernandes
- (Portugal national football team) Gonçalo Paciência
- (Portugal national football team) Pizzi
- (Serbia national football team) Luka Jović
- (Serbia national football team) Adem Ljajić
- (Serbia national football team) Nikola Milenković
- (Ukraine national football team) Artem Besyedin
- (Ukraine national football team) Marlos
- (Ukraine national football team) Andriy Yarmolenko
- (Ukraine national football team) Oleksandr Zinchenko

1 own goal

- (Luxembourg national football team) Gerson Rodrigues (against Ukraine)

== Discipline ==
A player was automatically suspended for the next match for the following offences:

- Receiving a red card (red card suspensions could be extended for serious offences)
- Receiving three yellow cards in three different matches, as well as after fifth and any subsequent yellow card (yellow card suspensions were not carried forward to the play-offs, the finals or any other future international matches)

The following suspensions were served during the qualifying matches:

Team	Player	Offence(s)	Suspended for match(es)
Lithuania	Saulius Mikoliūnas	(yellow card) (yellow-red card) vs Luxembourg (7 June 2019)	vs Serbia (10 June 2019)
Lithuania	Arvydas Novikovas	(yellow card) vs Luxembourg (7 June 2019); (yellow card) vs Serbia (10 June 2019); (yellow card) vs Ukraine (11 October 2019)	vs Serbia (14 October 2019)
Lithuania	Modestas Vorobjovas	(yellow card) (yellow-red card) vs Luxembourg (7 June 2019)	vs Serbia (10 June 2019)
Luxembourg	Leandro Barreiro	(yellow card) vs Ukraine (25 March 2019); (yellow card) vs Serbia (10 September 2019); (yellow card) vs Portugal (11 October 2019)	vs Serbia (14 November 2019)
Luxembourg	Dirk Carlson	(yellow card) vs Lithuania (22 March 2019); (yellow card) vs Ukraine (25 March 2019); (yellow card) vs Lithuania (7 June 2019)	vs Ukraine (10 June 2019)
Serbia	Uroš Spajić	(yellow card) vs Portugal (25 March 2019); (yellow card) vs Ukraine (7 June 2019); (yellow card) vs Luxembourg (10 September 2019)	vs Lithuania (14 October 2019)
Ukraine	Taras Stepanenko	(yellow card) (yellow-red card) vs Portugal (14 October 2019)	vs Serbia (17 November 2019)
