= Vytautas Adolfas Puplauskas =

Lithuanian politician (born 1930)

Vytautas Adolfas Puplauskas (born October 3, 1930 in Telšiai District Municipality) is a Lithuanian politician. In 1990 he was among those who signed the Act of the Re-Establishment of the State of Lithuania.
