= Vytautas Paliūnas =

Lithuanian politician

Vytautas Paliūnas (1930–2005) was a Lithuanian politician. In 1990, he was among those who signed the Act of the Re-Establishment of the State of Lithuania.

Paliūnas graduated from high school in Kėdainiai in 1949, and the Kaunas Polytechnic Institute in 1954. After graduation, he worked as an assistant at the Department of Hydrotechnology and studied as a postgraduate student at the VODGEO Institute of Science in Moscow.

From 1990 to 1992, he served as a member of the board of the Lithuanian Radio and Television.

Seimas
New constituency	Member of the Seimas for Panemunė; 1990-1992	Succeeded by Kazimieras Kuzminskas
