= Artem Byesyedin =

Ukrainian footballer

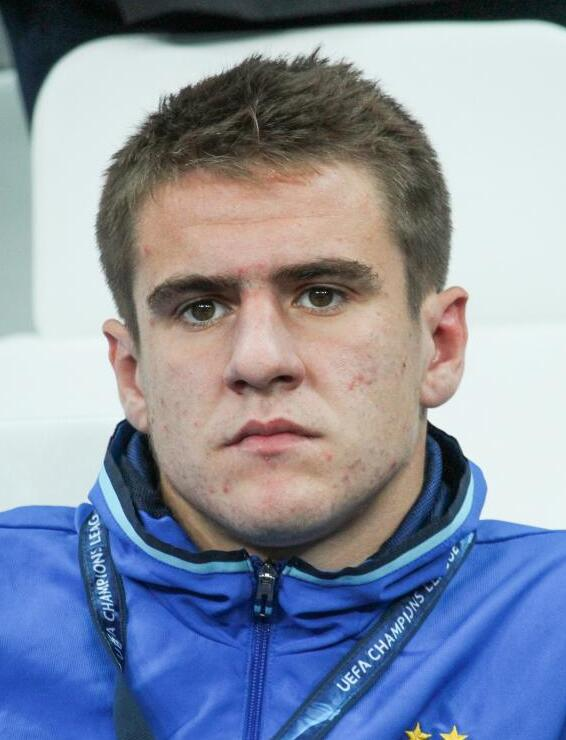

Personal information
- Full name: Artem Yuriyovych Byesyedin
- Date of birth: 31 March 1996 (age 30)
- Place of birth: Kharkiv, Ukraine
- Height: 1.88 m (6 ft 2 in)
- Position: Striker

Youth career
- Sports School 13 Kharkiv
- Arsenal Kharkiv
- 200?–2012: DVUFK 1 Kharkiv
- 2012: Metalist Kharkiv
- 2012–2013: Dynamo Kyiv

Senior career*
Years	Team	Apps	(Gls)
2013–2023	Dynamo Kyiv	92	(30)
2015–2016	→ Metalist Kharkiv (loan)	19	(1)
2023	→ Omonia (loan)	12	(1)
2023–2024	Ordabasy	25	(6)
2025–2026	Artis Brno	24	(2)

International career^{‡}
2012	Ukraine U16	2	(1)
2011–2012	Ukraine U17	5	(0)
2014	Ukraine U18	5	(3)
2014–2015	Ukraine U19	15	(2)
2015	Ukraine U20	8	(2)
2015–2017	Ukraine U21	15	(4)
2016–2021	Ukraine	19	(2)
- * Club domestic league appearances and goals as of 24 May 2026 ‡ National team caps and goals as of 27 June 2023

Artem Yuriyovych Byesyedin (Ukrainian: Артем Юрійович Бєсєдін; born 31 March 1996) is a Ukrainian professional footballer who plays as a striker.

== Club career ==
Byesyedin is a product of different sportive school systems. His first trainer was Yuriy Prydybaylo. From 3 March 2015 he played on loan for FC Metalist and made his debut in the Ukrainian Premier League in the match against FC Dynamo Kyiv on 1 March 2015.

On 17 January 2025, Byesyedin signed a contract with Czech club Líšeň as a free agent.

== International career ==
In November 2016, Byesyedin received his first call-up to the senior Ukraine squad for matches against Finland and Serbia. On 15 November 2016, he made his debut for the national team in the friendly match against Serbia, coming on as a substitute. On 17 November 2019 Byesyedin scored his second goal for the national team in the UEFA Euro 2020 qualification match against Serbia in Belgrade.

== Career statistics ==
=== Club ===
As of 3 October 2022

Club	Season	League			National Cup		Continental		Other		Total	
Club	Season	Division	Apps	Goals	Apps	Goals	Apps	Goals	Apps	Goals	Apps	Goals
Metalist Kharkiv (loan)	2014–15	Ukrainian Premier League	8	1	1	0	—		—		9	1
Metalist Kharkiv (loan)	2015–16	Ukrainian Premier League	11	0	1	0	—		—		12	0
Metalist Kharkiv (loan)	Total		19	1	2	0	—		—		21	1
Dynamo Kyiv	2015–16	Ukrainian Premier League	1	0	—		—		—		1	0
Dynamo Kyiv	2016–17	Ukrainian Premier League	22	9	2	0	3 (Note: Appearance(s) in UEFA Champions League)	1	—		27	10
Dynamo Kyiv	2017–18	Ukrainian Premier League	23	6	4	2	8 (Note: Appearance(s) in UEFA Europa League)	0	1 (Note: Appearance in Ukrainian Super Cup)	0	36	8
Dynamo Kyiv	2018–19	Ukrainian Premier League	12	2	—		5 (Note: Three appearances and one goal in UEFA Champions League, two appearances in UEFA Europa League)	1	1	0	18	3
Dynamo Kyiv	2019–20	Ukrainian Premier League	13	8	1	0	8 (Note: Two appearances in UEFA Champions League, six appearances in UEFA Europa League)	0	1	0	23	8
Dynamo Kyiv	2020–21	Ukrainian Premier League	12	5	3	1	3	0	0	0	18	6
Dynamo Kyiv	Total		83	30	10	3	27	2	3	0	123	35
Career Total			102	31	12	3	27	3	2	0	144	36

=== International ===
As of 17 November 2019

National Team	Year	Apps	Goals
Ukraine	2016	1	0
Ukraine	2017	6	1
Ukraine	2018	4	0
Ukraine	2019	2	1
Total		13	2

International goals

Scores and results list Ukraine's goal tally first.

No	Date	Venue	Opponent	Score	Result	Competition
1.	11 June 2017	Ratinan Stadion, Tampere, Finland	Finland	2–1	2–1	2018 FIFA World Cup qualification
2.	17 November 2019	Red Star Stadium, Belgrade, Serbia	Serbia	2–2	2–2	UEFA Euro 2020 qualification

== Honours ==
Dynamo Kyiv

- Ukrainian Premier League: 2020–21
- Ukrainian Cup: 2020–21

Omonia

- Cypriot Cup: 2022–23

Ordabasy

- Kazakhstan Premier League: 2023
