= David Turpel =

Luxembourgish footballer

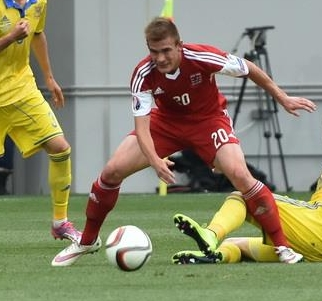

Personal information
- Date of birth: 19 October 1992 (age 34)
- Place of birth: Luxembourg City, Luxembourg
- Height: 1.85 m (6 ft 1 in)
- Position: Forward

Senior career*
Years	Team	Apps	(Gls)
2010–2014	Etzella Ettelbruck (Note: Stats do not include the 2011–12 season, as neither NFT nor Soccerway include stats from the Luxembourgian 2nd division, even though Turpel did make appearances that season, per this match report, amongst others.)	51	(25)
2014–2019	Dudelange	130	(95)
2019–2020	Virton	19	(3)
2020–2022	Swift Hesperange	0	(0)
2022–2024	Progrès Niederkorn	11	(2)
2024–2025	Atert Bissen	0	(0)
Total		211	(125)

International career
2012–2019	Luxembourg	51	(6)
- * Club domestic league appearances and goals as of 25 October 2025

David Turpel (born 19 October 1992) is a Luxembourgish retired professional footballer who played as a forward. He represented the Luxembourg national team internationally, scoring six goals in 51 appearances.

== Career ==
Born in Luxembourg City, Turpel has played club football for Etzella Ettelbruck, F91 Dudelange, Virton, Swift Hesperange and Progrès Niederkorn. He retired in October 2025, aged 32.

He made his international debut for Luxembourg in 2012.

== International goals ==
Scores and results list Luxembourg's goal tally first.

No	Date	Venue	Opponent	Score	Result	Competition
1.	9 October 2014	Philip II Arena, Skopje, Macedonia	North Macedonia	2–1	2–3	UEFA Euro 2016 qualification
2.	4 June 2017	Stade Josy Barthel, Luxembourg City, Luxembourg	Albania	1–1	2–1	Friendly
3.	15 October 2018	Stade Josy Barthel, Luxembourg City, Luxembourg	San Marino	1–0	3–0	2018–19 UEFA Nations League D
4.	25 March 2019	Stade Josy Barthel, Luxembourg City, Luxembourg	Ukraine	1–0	1–2	UEFA Euro 2020 qualification
5.	10 September 2019	Stade Josy Barthel, Luxembourg City, Luxembourg	Serbia	1–2	1–3	UEFA Euro 2020 qualification
6.	14 November 2019	Red Star Stadium, Belgrade, Serbia	Serbia	2–3	2–3	UEFA Euro 2020 qualification
