= Vytautas Andriuškevičius =

Lithuanian footballer (born 1990)

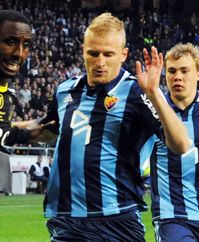
- Andriuškevičius playing for Djurgårdens IF in 2013.

Personal information
- Full name: Vytautas Andriuškevičius
- Date of birth: 8 October 1990 (age 36)
- Place of birth: Alytus, Lithuania
- Height: 1.87 m (6 ft 2 in)
- Position: Left-back

Youth career
- FBK Kaunas

Senior career*
Years	Team	Apps	(Gls)
2007–2010	FBK Kaunas	17	(1)
2007–2008	FBK Kaunas-2		
2010–2013	Lechia Gdańsk	32	(0)
2012	Lechia Gdańsk II	15	(1)
2013–2014	Djurgårdens IF	31	(0)
2014–2016	SC Cambuur	52	(0)
2016–2018	Portland Timbers	37	(1)
2017–2018	Portland Timbers 2	5	(0)
2018	D.C. United	0	(0)
2019	Sūduva	5	(0)
2019	Tobol	12	(0)
2020	Kyzylzhar	10	(0)
Total		216	(3)

International career
	Lithuania U19	8	(0)
2011–2012	Lithuania U21	8	(0)
2011–2019	Lithuania	31	(1)
- * Club domestic league appearances and goals

Vytautas Andriuškevičius (born 8 October 1990), commonly known as Vytas, is a Lithuanian former professional footballer who played as a left-back. He is now an assistant coach for the Portland Thorns of the American National Women's Soccer League (NWSL).

== Playing career ==
=== Club ===
Andriuškevičius began his professional career in 2007 with FBK Kaunas in Lithuania. From 2007 to 2008, he was loaned to FBK Kaunas's second team to gain experience as a starter. However, he was unable to earn meaningful playing time, and soon signed with Lechia Gdańsk of the Polish Ekstraklasa.

On 3 April 2013, he joined Djurgårdens IF on a one-year contract with an option for an additional three years.

In 2014, Andriuškevičius signed with SC Cambuur of the Dutch Eredivisie. On 13 May 2016, he left the team after it was relegated from Eredivisie to Eerste Divisie.

On 14 July 2016, he signed with the Portland Timbers of Major League Soccer (MLS) and played for two years there.

On 7 August 2018, it was announced that he had transferred within MLS to D.C. United in exchange for $50,000 of Targeted Allocation Money. He suffered a hip flexor injury during training which sidelined him for the rest of the season. He was released by D.C. United at the end of the 2018 season after not making a single appearance.

In 2019, he played five games for Lithuanian team FK Sūduva, which won the A Lyga that season. On 8 July 2019, he transferred to Kazakh team FC Tobol and played 12 games there. For the 2020 season, he transferred to another Kazakh team, FC Kyzylzhar, and played 10 games.

He announced his retirement in April 2021.

=== International ===
Andriuškevičius was part of the Lithuania national football team. On 10 September 2019 he scored his only international goal, against Portugal in a 1–5 loss.

== Coaching career ==
After retiring from playing, Andriuškevičius moved back to Portland and began coaching youth sports. On 11 May 2022, Portland Thorns FC — the women's team in the same organization as the Timbers — hired Andriuškevičius as an assistant coach.

== Career statistics ==
=== Club ===
Club	Season	Apps	Goals
FBK Kaunas	2006–07	1	0
FBK Kaunas	2007–08	4	0
FBK Kaunas	2008–09	10	1
FBK Kaunas	2009–10	2	0
Totals		17	1
Lechia Gdansk	2010–11	20	0
Lechia Gdansk	2011–12	14	0
Lechia Gdansk	2012–13	2	0
Totals		36	0
Djurgårdens IF	2012–13	19	0
Djurgårdens IF	2013–14	15	0
Totals		34	0
SC Cambuur	2014–15	28	0
SC Cambuur	2015–16	27	0
Totals		55	0
Portland Timbers	2015–16	15	1
Portland Timbers	2016–17	32	0
Career Total		189	2

=== National team ===
Lithuania national team
Year	Apps	Goals
2011	1	0
2012	6	0
2013	4	0
2014	5	0
2015	5	0
2016	2	0
2017	2	0
2019	6	1
Total	31	1

=== International goals ===
Scores and results list Lithuania's goal tally first.

No.	Date	Venue	Opponent	Score	Result	Competition
1.	10 September 2019	LFF Stadium, Vilnius, Lithuania	Portugal	1–1	1–5	UEFA Euro 2020 qualification

== Honours ==
FBK Kaunas

- A Lyga: 2007

Sūduva

- A Lyga: 2019
- Lithuanian Cup: 2019
