= 2014 FIFA World Cup qualification – UEFA Group B =

Football tournament qualification stage

The 2014 FIFA World Cup qualification UEFA Group B was a UEFA qualifying group for the 2014 FIFA World Cup. The group comprised Italy, Denmark, Czech Republic, Bulgaria, Armenia and Malta.

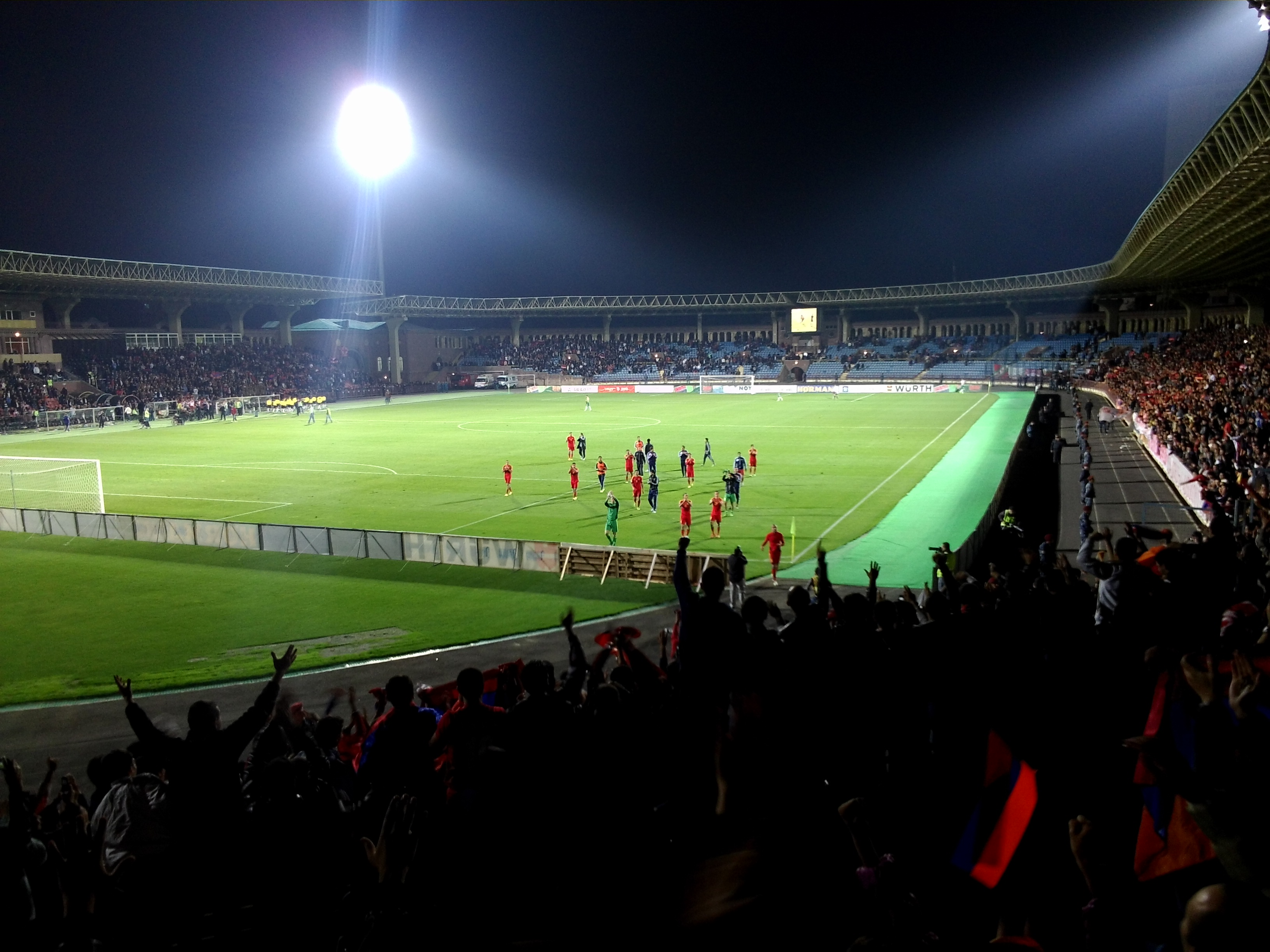
Armenia vs Bulgaria

The group winners, Italy, qualified directly for the 2014 FIFA World Cup. Denmark finished runners-up but were ranked as the poorest of the nine group runners-up and so did not advance to the play-offs.

== Standings ==
Pos	Team	Pld	W	D	L	GF	GA	GD	Pts	Qualification	Italy national football team	Denmark national football team	Czech Republic national football team	Bulgaria national football team	Armenia national football team	Malta national football team
1	Italy	10	6	4	0	19	9	+10	22	Qualification to 2014 FIFA World Cup	—	3–1	2–1	1–0	2–2	2–0
2	Denmark	10	4	4	2	17	12	+5	16		2–2	—	0–0	1–1	0–4	6–0
3	Czech Republic	10	4	3	3	13	9	+4	15		0–0	0–3	—	0–0	1–2	3–1
4	Bulgaria	10	3	4	3	14	9	+5	13		2–2	1–1	0–1	—	1–0	6–0
5	Armenia	10	4	1	5	12	13	−1	13		1–3	0–1	0–3	2–1	—	0–1
6	Malta	10	1	0	9	5	28	−23	3		0–2	1–2	1–4	1–2	0–1	—

Denmark was ranked as the worst runner-up among all nine groups (having scored fewer points than the other eight) and so they failed to advance to the play-offs.

== Matches ==
The match schedule was determined at a meeting in Prague, Czech Republic, on 28 November 2011.

7 September 2012
20:00 UTC+2

Malta	0–1	Armenia
	Report	Sarkisov 70'

National Stadium, Ta' Qali
Attendance: 3,517
Referee: Rene Eisner (Austria)
7 September 2012
21:45 UTC+3

Bulgaria	2–2	Italy
Manolev 30'; G. Milanov 66'	Report	Osvaldo 36', 40'

Vasil Levski National Stadium, Sofia
Attendance: 12,993
Referee: Martin Atkinson (England)
8 September 2012
20:15 UTC+2

Denmark	0–0	Czech Republic
	Report

Parken, Copenhagen
Attendance: 24,004
Referee: Wolfgang Stark (Germany)

11 September 2012
21:00 UTC+3

Bulgaria	1–0	Armenia
Manolev 43'	Report

Vasil Levski National Stadium, Sofia
Attendance: 17,883
Referee: Stephan Studer (Switzerland)
11 September 2012
20:45 UTC+2

Italy	2–0	Malta
Destro 5'; Peluso 90+2'	Report

Stadio Alberto Braglia, Modena
Attendance: 18,000
Referee: Antti Munukka (Finland)

12 October 2012
18:00 UTC+2

Czech Republic	3–1	Malta
Gebre Selassie 34'; Pekhart 52'; Rezek 67'	Report	Briffa 38'

Stadion města Plzně, Plzeň
Attendance: 10,358
Referee: Anar Salmanov (Azerbaijan)
12 October 2012
21:00 UTC+4

Armenia	1–3	Italy
Mkhitaryan 28'	Report	Pirlo 11' (pen.); De Rossi 64'; Osvaldo 82'

Hrazdan Stadium, Yerevan
Attendance: 25,000
Referee: Marijo Strahonja (Croatia)
12 October 2012
21:00 UTC+3

Bulgaria	1–1	Denmark
Rangelov 7'	Report	Bendtner 40'

Vasil Levski National Stadium, Sofia
Attendance: 20,780
Referee: Tony Chapron (France)

16 October 2012
20:00 UTC+2

Czech Republic	0–0	Bulgaria
	Report

Generali Arena, Prague
Attendance: 16,163
Referee: Vladislav Bezborodov (Russia)
16 October 2012
20:45 UTC+2

Italy	3–1	Denmark
Montolivo 34'; De Rossi 37'; Balotelli 54'	Report	Kvist 45+1'

Stadio Giuseppe Meazza, Milan
Attendance: 37,027
Referee: Damir Skomina (Slovenia)

22 March 2013
18:00 UTC+2

Bulgaria	6–0	Malta
Tonev 6', 38', 68'; I. Popov 47'; Gargorov 55'; Ivanov 78'	Report

Vasil Levski National Stadium, Sofia
Attendance: 0 (Note: Bulgaria v Malta was played without spectators due to sanctions imposed by FIFA as a result of racist chanting by Bulgarian supporters at the home match against Denmark.)
Referee: Eitan Shemeulevitch (Israel)
22 March 2013
20:30 UTC+1

Czech Republic	0–3	Denmark
	Report	Cornelius 57'; Kjær 67'; Zimling 83'

Andrův stadion, Olomouc
Attendance: 12,288
Referee: Manuel De Sousa (Portugal)

26 March 2013
20:00 UTC+4

Armenia	0–3	Czech Republic
	Report	Vydra 47', 81'; Kolář 90+4'

Republican Stadium, Yerevan
Attendance: 14,403
Referee: Cristian Balaj (Romania)
26 March 2013
20:15 UTC+1

Denmark	1–1	Bulgaria
Agger 63' (pen.)	Report	Manolev 51'

Parken, Copenhagen
Attendance: 22,357
Referee: Fırat Aydınus (Turkey)
26 March 2013
20:45 UTC+1

Malta	0–2	Italy
	Report	Balotelli 8' (pen.), 45'

National Stadium, Ta' Qali
Attendance: 17,011
Referee: Serdar Gözübüyük (Netherlands)

7 June 2013
20:00 UTC+4

Armenia	0–1	Malta
	Report	Mifsud 8'

Republican Stadium, Yerevan
Attendance: 8,500
Referee: Arnold Hunter (Northern Ireland)
7 June 2013
20:45 UTC+2

Czech Republic	0–0	Italy
	Report

Generali Arena, Prague
Attendance: 18,235
Referee: Svein Oddvar Moen (Norway)

11 June 2013
20:15 UTC+2

Denmark	0–4	Armenia
	Report	Movsisyan 1', 59'; Özbiliz 19'; Mkhitaryan 82'

Parken, Copenhagen
Attendance: 14,284
Referee: Aleksei Nikolaev (Russia)

6 September 2013
18:00 UTC+2

Czech Republic	1–2	Armenia
Rosický 70'	Report	Mkrtchyan 30'; Ghazaryan 90+2'

Eden Arena, Prague
Attendance: 17,628
Referee: Antony Gautier (France)
6 September 2013
20:00 UTC+2

Malta	1–2	Denmark
Failla 38'	Report	Andreasen 2'; Camilleri 52' (o.g.)

National Stadium, Ta' Qali
Attendance: 5,576
Referee: Anastasios Sidiropoulos (Greece)
6 September 2013
20:45 UTC+2

Italy	1–0	Bulgaria
Gilardino 38'	Report

Stadio Renzo Barbera, Palermo
Attendance: 28,662
Referee: Carlos Velasco Carballo (Spain)

10 September 2013
20:00 UTC+4

Armenia	0–1	Denmark
	Report	Agger 73' (pen.)

Hrazdan Stadium, Yerevan
Attendance: 23,000
Referee: Bas Nijhuis (Netherlands)
10 September 2013
20:00 UTC+2

Malta	1–2	Bulgaria
Herrera 77'	Report	Dimitrov 9'; Gargorov 59'

National Stadium, Ta' Qali
Attendance: 4,884
Referee: Alexandru Tudor (Romania)
10 September 2013
20:45 UTC+2

Italy	2–1	Czech Republic
Chiellini 51'; Balotelli 54' (pen.)	Report	Kozák 19'

Juventus Stadium, Turin
Attendance: 35,299
Referee: Jonas Eriksson (Sweden)

11 October 2013
19:00 UTC+4

Armenia	2–1	Bulgaria
Özbiliz 45+1'; Movsisyan 87'	Report	Popov 61'

Republican Stadium, Yerevan
Attendance: 11,000
Referee: Felix Brych (Germany)
11 October 2013
19:30 UTC+2

Malta	1–4	Czech Republic
Mifsud 47'	Report	Hübschman 3'; Lafata 33'; Kadlec 51'; Pekhart 90'

National Stadium, Ta' Qali
Attendance: 4,530
Referee: Matej Jug (Slovenia)
11 October 2013
20:15 UTC+2

Denmark	2–2	Italy
Bendtner 45+1', 79'	Report	Osvaldo 28'; Aquilani 90+1'

Parken, Copenhagen
Attendance: 35,305
Referee: Stéphane Lannoy (France)

15 October 2013
21:15 UTC+3

Bulgaria	0–1	Czech Republic
	Report	Dočkal 51'

Vasil Levski National Stadium, Sofia
Attendance: 25,464
Referee: Viktor Kassai (Hungary)
15 October 2013
20:15 UTC+2

Denmark	6–0	Malta
Rasmussen 8', 74'; Agger 11' (pen.), 39' (pen.); Bjelland 28'; Nielsen 84'	Report

Parken, Copenhagen
Attendance: 11,479
Referee: Aleksandar Stavrev (Macedonia)
15 October 2013
20:45 UTC+2

Italy	2–2	Armenia
Florenzi 24'; Balotelli 76'	Report	Movsisyan 5'; Mkhitaryan 70'

Stadio San Paolo, Naples
Attendance: 22,000
Referee: Michael Oliver (England)

== Goalscorers ==
There were 80 goals scored in 30 matches, for an average of 2.67 goals per match.

5 goals

- (Italy) Mario Balotelli

4 goals

- (Armenia) Yura Movsisyan
- (Denmark) Daniel Agger
- (Italy) Pablo Daniel Osvaldo

3 goals

- (Armenia) Henrikh Mkhitaryan
- (Bulgaria) Stanislav Manolev
- (Bulgaria) Aleksandar Tonev
- (Denmark) Nicklas Bendtner

2 goals

- (Armenia) Aras Özbiliz
- (Bulgaria) Emil Gargorov
- (Bulgaria) Ivelin Popov
- (Czech Republic) Tomáš Pekhart
- (Czech Republic) Matěj Vydra
- (Denmark) Morten Rasmussen
- (Italy) Daniele De Rossi
- (Malta) Michael Mifsud

1 goal

- (Armenia) Gevorg Ghazaryan
- (Armenia) Karlen Mkrtchyan
- (Armenia) Artur Sarkisov
- (Bulgaria) Radoslav Dimitrov
- (Bulgaria) Ivan Ivanov
- (Bulgaria) Georgi Milanov
- (Bulgaria) Dimitar Rangelov
- (Czech Republic) Bořek Dočkal
- (Czech Republic) Theodor Gebre Selassie
- (Czech Republic) Daniel Kolář
- (Czech Republic) Libor Kozák
- (Czech Republic) Jan Rezek
- (Czech Republic) Tomáš Rosický
- (Czech Republic) Tomáš Hübschman
- (Czech Republic) David Lafata
- (Czech Republic) Václav Kadlec
- (Denmark) Leon Andreasen
- (Denmark) Andreas Bjelland
- (Denmark) Andreas Cornelius
- (Denmark) Simon Kjær
- (Denmark) William Kvist
- (Denmark) Nicki Bille Nielsen
- (Denmark) Niki Zimling
- (Italy) Giorgio Chiellini
- (Italy) Mattia Destro
- (Italy) Alessandro Florenzi
- (Italy) Alberto Gilardino
- (Italy) Riccardo Montolivo
- (Italy) Federico Peluso
- (Italy) Andrea Pirlo
- (Italy) Alberto Aquilani
- (Malta) Roderick Briffa
- (Malta) Clayton Failla
- (Malta) Edward Herrera

1 own goal

- (Malta) Ryan Camilleri (against Denmark)

== Discipline ==
Pos	Player	Country	Yellow card	Red card	Suspended for match(es)	Reason
DF	Ivan Bandalovski	Bulgaria	2	1	vs Denmark (12 October 2012)	Sent off in a 2014 World Cup qualifying match
MF	Gevorg Ghazaryan	Armenia	2	1	vs Italy (12 October 2012)	Booked in two 2014 World Cup qualifying matches
FW	Mario Balotelli	Italy	3	1	vs Bulgaria (6 September 2013)	Sent off in a 2014 World Cup qualifying match
FW	Marcos Pizzelli	Armenia	0	1	vs Italy (12 October 2012)	Sent off in a 2014 World Cup qualifying match
FW	Pablo Daniel Osvaldo	Italy	0	1	vs Armenia (12 October 2012) vs Malta (26 March 2013)	Sent off in a 2014 World Cup qualifying match
DF	Sargis Hovsepyan	Armenia	2	0	vs Italy (12 October 2012)	Booked in two 2014 World Cup qualifying matches
FW	Andreas Cornelius	Denmark	2	0	vs Italy (16 October 2012)	Booked in two 2014 World Cup qualifying matches
MF	William Kvist	Denmark	3	0	vs Czech Republic (23 March 2013)	Booked in two 2014 World Cup qualifying matches
MF	Karlen Mkrtchyan	Armenia	2	0	vs Czech Republic (26 March 2013)	Booked in two 2014 World Cup qualifying matches
DF	Hrayr Mkoyan	Armenia	2	0	vs Czech Republic (26 March 2013)	Booked in two 2014 World Cup qualifying matches
MF	Arthur Yedigaryan	Armenia	5	0	vs Czech Republic (26 March 2013) vs Denmark (10 September 2013)	Booked in two 2014 World Cup qualifying matches Booked in two 2014 World Cup qualifying matches
MF	Daniele De Rossi	Italy	2	0	vs Malta (26 March 2013)	Booked in two 2014 World Cup qualifying matches
DF	Yordan Minev	Bulgaria	2	0	vs Denmark (26 March 2013)	Booked in two 2014 World Cup qualifying matches
FW	Nicolai Jørgensen	Denmark	2	0	vs Armenia (11 June 2013)	Booked in two 2014 World Cup qualifying matches
MF	Georgi Milanov	Bulgaria	2	0	vs Italy (6 September 2013)	Booked in two 2014 World Cup qualifying matches
DF	Luke Dimech	Malta	2	0	vs Denmark (6 September 2013)	Booked in two 2014 World Cup qualifying matches
DF	Alex Muscat	Malta	2	0	vs Denmark (6 September 2013)	Booked in two 2014 World Cup qualifying matches
MF	Vladimír Darida	Czech Republic	2	0	vs Armenia (6 September 2013)	Booked in two 2014 World Cup qualifying matches
DF	Robert Arzumanyan	Armenia	3	0	vs Denmark (10 September 2013)	Booked in two 2014 World Cup qualifying matches
FW	Yura Movsisyan	Armenia	3	0	vs Denmark (10 September 2013)	Booked in two 2014 World Cup qualifying matches
MF	Roderick Briffa	Malta	2	0	vs Bulgaria (10 September 2013)	Booked in two 2014 World Cup qualifying matches
DF	Varazdat Haroyan	Armenia	3	1	vs Bulgaria (11 October 2013)	Sent off in a 2014 World Cup qualifying match
MF	André Schembri	Malta	2	0	vs Czech Republic (11 October 2013)	Booked in two 2014 World Cup qualifying matches
MF	Daniel Kolář	Czech Republic	2	1	vs Malta (11 October 2013)	Sent off in a 2014 World Cup qualifying match
ST	Libor Kozák	Czech Republic	2	0	vs Malta (11 October 2013)	Booked in two 2014 World Cup qualifying matches
DF	Yordan Minev	Bulgaria	2	0	vs Czech Republic (15 October 2013)	Booked in two 2014 World Cup qualifying matches
MF	Svetoslav Dyakov	Bulgaria	3	1	vs Czech Republic (15 October 2013)	Sent off in a 2014 World Cup qualifying match
DF	Nikolay Bodurov	Bulgaria	1	1	vs Czech Republic (15 October 2013)	Sent off in a 2014 World Cup qualifying match
ST	Michael Mifsud	Malta	2	0	vs Denmark (15 October 2013)	Booked in two 2014 World Cup qualifying matches
DF	Tomáš Sivok	Czech Republic	2	0	vs Bulgaria (15 October 2013)	Booked in two 2014 World Cup qualifying matches
MF	Niki Zimling	Denmark	2	0	vs Malta (15 October 2013)	Booked in two 2014 World Cup qualifying matches
FW	Nicklas Bendtner	Denmark	2	0	vs Malta (15 October 2013)	Booked in two 2014 World Cup qualifying matches
DF	Nicolai Boilesen	Denmark	2	0	vs Malta (15 October 2013)	Booked in two 2014 World Cup qualifying matches

== Attendances ==
Team	Total	Highest	Lowest	Average
Armenia	81,903	25,000	8,500	16,381
Bulgaria	77,120	25,464	0	15,424
Czech Republic	74,672	18,235	10,358	14,934
Denmark	107,429	35,305	11,479	21,486
Italy	140,988	37,027	18,000	28,198
Malta	35,518	18,000	3,517	7,104
