= 2014 FIFA World Cup qualification – UEFA second round =

Football qualification rankings

The UEFA second round was contested by the best eight runners-up from the nine first-round groups from the UEFA segment of the qualification tournament for the 2014 FIFA World Cup in football. The winners – Croatia, France, Greece, and Portugal – of each of four home and away ties joined the group winners in the World Cup in Brazil. The matches, which are often referred to as 'play-offs', were held on 15 and 19 November 2013.

The draw for the ties was held in Zürich on 21 October, with the October 2013 FIFA World Rankings used to decide which of the teams would be seeded.

== Qualified teams ==
The eight best runners-up from the UEFA first round qualified for the play-offs; with one group having one team fewer than the others, matches against the sixth-placed team in each First Round group did not count for this ranking. As a result, eight matches played by each team counted for the purposes of ranking the runners-up (below table).

=== Ranking of second-placed teams ===
The eight best runners-up were determined by the following parameters in this order:

1. Highest number of points
2. Goal difference
3. Highest number of goals scored

Pos	Grp	Team	Pld	W	D	L	GF	GA	GD	Pts	Qualification
1	G	Greece	8	6	1	1	9	4	+5	19	Advance to second round (play-offs)
2	I	France	8	5	2	1	15	6	+9	17	Advance to second round (play-offs)
3	F	Portugal	8	4	3	1	15	8	+7	15	Advance to second round (play-offs)
4	H	Ukraine	8	4	3	1	11	4	+7	15	Advance to second round (play-offs)
5	C	Sweden	8	4	2	2	15	13	+2	14	Advance to second round (play-offs)
6	E	Iceland	8	4	2	2	15	14	+1	14	Advance to second round (play-offs)
7	D	Romania	8	4	1	3	11	12	−1	13	Advance to second round (play-offs)
8	A	Croatia	8	3	2	3	9	8	+1	11	Advance to second round (play-offs)
9	B	Denmark	8	2	4	2	9	11	−2	10	

== Seeding and draw ==
The second round draw took place at the headquarters of FIFA in Zurich on 21 October at 14:00 UTC+2, and was conducted by Gordon Savic, Head of FIFA World Cup Qualifiers, with the assistance of former Switzerland international Alexander Frei. October 2013 FIFA World Rankings were used to decide which of the teams would be seeded (shown below in brackets).

The following teams participated in the second round:

Pot 1 (seeded)
Team	Rank
Portugal	14
Greece	15
Croatia	18
Ukraine	20

Pot 2 (unseeded)
Team	Rank
France	21
Sweden	25
Romania	29
Iceland	46

== Matches ==
Team 1	Agg.	Team 2	1st leg	2nd leg
Portugal	4–2	Sweden	1–0	3–2
Ukraine	2–3	France	2–0	0–3
Greece	4–2	Romania	3–1	1–1
Iceland	0–2	Croatia	0–0	0–2

15 November 2013
19:45 UTC±0

Portugal	1–0	Sweden
Ronaldo 82'	Report

Estádio da Luz, Lisbon
Attendance: 61,467
Referee: Nicola Rizzoli (Italy)
19 November 2013
20:45 UTC+1

Sweden	2–3	Portugal
Ibrahimović 68', 72'	Report	Ronaldo 50', 77', 79'

Friends Arena, Solna
Attendance: 49,766
Referee: Howard Webb (England)

Portugal won 4–2 on aggregate and qualified for the 2014 FIFA World Cup.

15 November 2013
21:45 UTC+2

Ukraine	2–0	France
Zozulya 62'; Yarmolenko 82' (pen.)	Report

Olympic Stadium, Kyiv
Attendance: 67,732
Referee: Cüneyt Çakır (Turkey)
19 November 2013
21:00 UTC+1

France	3–0	Ukraine
Sakho 22', 72'; Benzema 34'	Report

Stade de France, Saint-Denis
Attendance: 77,098
Referee: Damir Skomina (Slovenia)

France won 3–2 on aggregate and qualified for the 2014 FIFA World Cup.

15 November 2013
21:45 UTC+2

Greece	3–1	Romania
Mitroglou 14', 67'; Salpingidis 21'	Report	Stancu 19'

Karaiskakis Stadium, Athens
Attendance: 26,200
Referee: Pedro Proença (Portugal)
19 November 2013
21:00 UTC+2

Romania	1–1	Greece
Torosidis 55' (o.g.)	Report	Mitroglou 23'

Arena Națională, Bucharest
Attendance: 49,793
Referee: Milorad Mažić (Serbia)

Greece won 4–2 on aggregate and qualified for the 2014 FIFA World Cup.

15 November 2013
19:00 UTC±0

Iceland	0–0	Croatia
	Report

Laugardalsvöllur, Reykjavík
Attendance: 9,767
Referee: Alberto Undiano Mallenco (Spain)
19 November 2013
20:15 UTC+1

Croatia	2–0	Iceland
Mandžukić 27'; Srna 47'	Report

Stadion Maksimir, Zagreb
Attendance: 22,612
Referee: Björn Kuipers (Netherlands)

Croatia won 2–0 on aggregate and qualified for the 2014 FIFA World Cup.

== Discipline ==
Pos	Player	Country	Yellow card	Red card	Suspended for match(es)	Reason
DF	Birkir Már Sævarsson	Iceland	2	0	vs Croatia (15 November 2013)	Booked in two 2014 World Cup qualifying matches
MF	Ognjen Vukojević	Croatia	2	0	vs Iceland (15 November 2013)	Booked in two 2014 World Cup qualifying matches
FW	Panagiotis Kone	Greece	2	0	vs Romania (15 November 2013)	Booked in two 2014 World Cup qualifying matches
MF	Ólafur Ingi Skúlason	Iceland	0	1	vs Croatia (19 November 2013)	Sent off in a 2014 World Cup qualifying match
FW	Mario Mandžukić	Croatia	0	1	vs Brazil (12 June 2014)	Sent off in a 2014 World Cup qualifying match
MF	Costin Lazăr	Romania	2	1	vs Greece (19 November 2013)	Sent off in a 2014 World Cup qualifying match
DF	Laurent Koscielny	France	0	1	vs Ukraine (19 November 2013)	Sent off in a 2014 World Cup qualifying match
DF	Artem Fedetskyi	Ukraine	2	0	vs France (19 November 2013)	Booked in two 2014 World Cup qualifying match
DF	Oleksandr Kucher	Ukraine	2	1	vs France (19 November 2013)	Sent off in a 2014 World Cup qualifying match

== Goalscorers ==
There were 19 goals scored in 8 matches, for an average of 2.38 goals per match.

4 goals

- (Portugal) Cristiano Ronaldo

3 goals

- (Greece) Kostas Mitroglou

2 goals

- (France) Mamadou Sakho
- (Sweden) Zlatan Ibrahimović

1 goal

- (Croatia) Mario Mandžukić
- (Croatia) Darijo Srna
- (France) Karim Benzema
- (Greece) Dimitris Salpingidis
- (Romania) Bogdan Stancu
- (Ukraine) Andriy Yarmolenko
- (Ukraine) Roman Zozulya

1 own goal

- (Greece) Vasilis Torosidis (against Romania)
