= 2014 FIFA World Cup qualification – UEFA Group D =

Football tournament qualification stage

The 2014 FIFA World Cup qualification UEFA Group D was a UEFA qualifying group for the 2014 FIFA World Cup. The group comprised Netherlands, Turkey, Hungary, Romania, Estonia and Andorra.

The group winners, Netherlands, qualified directly for the 2014 FIFA World Cup. Romania placed among the eight best runners-up and advanced to the play-offs, where they were drawn to play home-and-away matches against Greece. However, they failed to qualify for the World Cup after losing the first match and drawing the second.

== Standings ==
Pos	Team	Pld	W	D	L	GF	GA	GD	Pts	Qualification	Netherlands national football team	Romania national football team	Hungary national football team	Turkey national football team	Estonia national football team	Andorra national football team
1	Netherlands	10	9	1	0	34	5	+29	28	Qualification to 2014 FIFA World Cup	—	4–0	8–1	2–0	3–0	3–0
2	Romania	10	6	1	3	19	12	+7	19	Advance to second round	1–4	—	3–0	0–2	2–0	4–0
3	Hungary	10	5	2	3	21	20	+1	17		1–4	2–2	—	3–1	5–1	2–0
4	Turkey	10	5	1	4	16	9	+7	16		0–2	0–1	1–1	—	3–0	5–0
5	Estonia	10	2	1	7	6	20	−14	7		2–2	0–2	0–1	0–2	—	2–0
6	Andorra	10	0	0	10	0	30	−30	0		0–2	0–4	0–5	0–2	0–1	—

== Matches ==
A meeting was held on 24 October 2011 in Amsterdam, Netherlands, to determine the fixtures. The meeting, however, was not successful and a schedule could not be determined. FIFA gave the teams involved until late December 2011 to finalise the schedule, with the set of fixtures determined by a draw held on 21 December in Amsterdam.

7 September 2012
21:00 UTC+3

Estonia	0–2	Romania
	Report	Torje 56'; Marica 76'

Lilleküla Stadium, Tallinn
Attendance: 7,936
Referee: Milorad Mažić (Serbia)
7 September 2012
20:30 UTC+2

Andorra	0–5	Hungary
	Report	Juhász 12'; Gera 33'; Szalai 54'; Priskin 68'; Koman 82'

Estadi Comunal, Andorra la Vella
Attendance: 815
Referee: Emir Alecković (Bosnia and Herzegovina)
7 September 2012
20:30 UTC+2

Netherlands	2–0	Turkey
Van Persie 17'; Narsingh 90+3'	Report

Amsterdam Arena, Amsterdam
Attendance: 49,500
Referee: Carlos Velasco Carballo (Spain)

11 September 2012
20:30 UTC+3

Romania	4–0	Andorra
Torje 29'; Lazăr 44'; Găman 90'; Maxim 90+3'	Report

Arena Națională, Bucharest
Attendance: 24,630
Referee: Pavle Radovanović (Montenegro)
11 September 2012
21:00 UTC+3

Turkey	3–0	Estonia
Emre 44'; Bulut 60'; İnan 75'	Report

Şükrü Saracoğlu Stadium, Istanbul
Attendance: 44,168
Referee: Marcin Borski (Poland)
11 September 2012
20:30 UTC+2

Hungary	1–4	Netherlands
Dzsudzsák 7' (pen.)	Report	Lens 3', 53'; Martins Indi 19'; Huntelaar 75'

Ferenc Puskás Stadion, Budapest
Attendance: 22,700
Referee: Pedro Proença (Portugal)

12 October 2012
20:30 UTC+3

Turkey	0–1	Romania
	Report	Grozav 45'

Şükrü Saracoğlu Stadium, Istanbul
Attendance: 46,203
Referee: Howard Webb (England)
12 October 2012
21:30 UTC+3

Estonia	0–1	Hungary
	Report	Hajnal 46'

Lilleküla Stadium, Tallinn
Attendance: 5,661
Referee: Liran Liany (Israel)
12 October 2012
20:30 UTC+2

Netherlands	3–0	Andorra
Van der Vaart 7'; Huntelaar 15'; Schaken 50'	Report

De Kuip, Rotterdam
Attendance: 43,000
Referee: Aleksei Kulbakov (Belarus)

16 October 2012
19:00 UTC+2

Andorra	0–1	Estonia
	Report	Oper 57'

Estadi Comunal, Andorra la Vella
Attendance: 723
Referee: Dimitar Meckarovski (Macedonia)
16 October 2012
21:00 UTC+3

Romania	1–4	Netherlands
Marica 40'	Report	Lens 9'; Martins Indi 29'; Van der Vaart 45+1' (pen.); Van Persie 86'

Arena Națională, Bucharest
Attendance: 53,329
Referee: Craig Thomson (Scotland)
16 October 2012
20:30 UTC+2

Hungary	3–1	Turkey
Koman 31'; Szalai 50'; Gera 57' (pen.)	Report	Erdinç 22'

Ferenc Puskás Stadion, Budapest
Attendance: 21,563
Referee: Daniele Orsato (Italy)

22 March 2013
19:15 UTC+1

Andorra	0–2	Turkey
	Report	İnan 30'; Yılmaz 45+1'

Estadi Comunal, Andorra la Vella
Attendance: 910
Referee: Nerijus Dunauskas (Lithuania)
22 March 2013
20:30 UTC+1

Hungary	2–2	Romania
Vanczák 16'; Dzsudzsák 71' (pen.)	Report	Mutu 68' (pen.); Chipciu 90+2'

Ferenc Puskás Stadion, Budapest
Attendance: 0 (Note: Hungary v Romania was played without spectators due to sanctions imposed by FIFA as a result of racist chanting by Hungarian supporters at the friendly match against Israel on 15 August 2012.)
Referee: Wolfgang Stark (Germany)
22 March 2013
20:30 UTC+1

Netherlands	3–0	Estonia
Van der Vaart 47'; Van Persie 72'; Schaken 84'	Report

Amsterdam Arena, Amsterdam
Attendance: 48,675
Referee: Vitali Meshkov (Russia)

26 March 2013
19:00 UTC+2

Estonia	2–0	Andorra
Anier 45+1'; Lindpere 61'	Report

Lilleküla Stadium, Tallinn
Attendance: 5,237
Referee: Ján Valášek (Slovakia)
26 March 2013
20:30 UTC+2

Turkey	1–1	Hungary
Yılmaz 64'	Report	Böde 71'

Şükrü Saracoğlu Stadium, Istanbul
Attendance: 37,904
Referee: Milorad Mažić (Serbia)
26 March 2013
20:30 UTC+1

Netherlands	4–0	Romania
Van der Vaart 12'; Van Persie 56', 65' (pen.); Lens 90'	Report

Amsterdam Arena, Amsterdam
Attendance: 47,496
Referee: Mark Clattenburg (England)

6 September 2013
21:00 UTC+3

Romania	3–0	Hungary
Marica 2'; Pintilii 31'; Tănase 88'	Report

Arena Națională, Bucharest
Attendance: 41,405
Referee: Alberto Undiano Mallenco (Spain)
6 September 2013
21:00 UTC+3

Turkey	5–0	Andorra
Bulut 35', 39', 67'; Yılmaz 64'; Turan 90+2'	Report

Kadir Has Stadium, Kayseri
Attendance: 21,923
Referee: Sven Bindels (Luxembourg)
6 September 2013
21:30 UTC+3

Estonia	2–2	Netherlands
Vassiljev 18', 57'	Report	Robben 2'; Van Persie 90+4' (pen.)

Lilleküla Stadium, Tallinn
Attendance: 10,210
Referee: Serhiy Boyko (Ukraine)

10 September 2013
21:00 UTC+3

Romania	0–2	Turkey
	Report	Yılmaz 22'; Erdinç 90+4'

Arena Națională, Bucharest
Attendance: 44,537
Referee: Svein Oddvar Moen (Norway)
10 September 2013
20:30 UTC+2

Andorra	0–2	Netherlands
	Report	Van Persie 50', 54'

Estadi Comunal, Andorra la Vella
Attendance: 1,100
Referee: Ante Vučemilović-Šimunović Jr. (Croatia)
10 September 2013
20:30 UTC+2

Hungary	5–1	Estonia
Klavan 11' (o.g.); Hajnal 21'; Böde 41'; Németh 69'; Dzsudzsák 85'	Report	Kink 48'

Ferenc Puskás Stadion, Budapest
Attendance: 7,741
Referee: Aleksei Kulbakov (Belarus)

11 October 2013
20:30 UTC+2

Andorra	0–4	Romania
	Report	Keșerü 43'; Stancu 53'; Torje 63' (pen.); Lazăr 85'

Estadi Comunal, Andorra la Vella
Attendance: 1,100
Referee: Stephan Klossner (Switzerland)
11 October 2013
21:30 UTC+3

Estonia	0–2	Turkey
	Report	Bulut 22'; Yılmaz 46'

Lilleküla Stadium, Tallinn
Attendance: 8,572
Referee: Nicola Rizzoli (Italy)
11 October 2013
20:30 UTC+2

Netherlands	8–1	Hungary
Van Persie 16', 44', 53'; Strootman 25'; Lens 38'; Devecseri 65' (o.g.); Van der Vaart 86'; Robben 90'	Report	Dzsudzsák 47' (pen.)

Amsterdam Arena, Amsterdam
Attendance: 52,027
Referee: Martin Atkinson (England)

15 October 2013
20:00 UTC+2

Hungary	2–0	Andorra
Nikolić 51'; Lima 76' (o.g.)	Report

Ferenc Puskás Stadion, Budapest
Attendance: 5,200
Referee: Daniel Stefański (Poland)
15 October 2013
21:00 UTC+3

Romania	2–0	Estonia
Marica 30' (pen.), 81'	Report

Arena Națională, Bucharest
Attendance: 18,852
Referee: Marijo Strahonja (Croatia)
15 October 2013
21:00 UTC+3

Turkey	0–2	Netherlands
	Report	Robben 8'; Sneijder 47'

Şükrü Saracoğlu Stadium, Istanbul
Attendance: 41,814
Referee: Olegário Benquerença (Portugal)

== Goalscorers ==
There were 96 goals scored in 30 matches, for an average of 3.2 goals per match.

11 goals

- (Netherlands) Robin van Persie

5 goals

- (Netherlands) Jeremain Lens
- (Netherlands) Rafael van der Vaart
- (Romania) Ciprian Marica
- (Turkey) Umut Bulut
- (Turkey) Burak Yılmaz

4 goals

- (Hungary) Balázs Dzsudzsák

3 goals

- (Netherlands) Arjen Robben
- (Romania) Gabriel Torje

2 goals

- (Estonia) Konstantin Vassiljev
- (Hungary) Dániel Böde
- (Hungary) Zoltán Gera
- (Hungary) Tamás Hajnal
- (Hungary) Vladimir Koman
- (Hungary) Ádám Szalai
- (Netherlands) Klaas-Jan Huntelaar
- (Netherlands) Bruno Martins Indi
- (Netherlands) Ruben Schaken
- (Romania) Costin Lazăr
- (Turkey) Mevlüt Erdinç
- (Turkey) Selçuk İnan

1 goal

- (Estonia) Henri Anier
- (Estonia) Tarmo Kink
- (Estonia) Joel Lindpere
- (Estonia) Andres Oper
- (Hungary) Roland Juhász
- (Hungary) Krisztián Németh
- (Hungary) Nemanja Nikolić
- (Hungary) Tamás Priskin
- (Hungary) Vilmos Vanczak
- (Netherlands) Luciano Narsingh
- (Netherlands) Wesley Sneijder
- (Netherlands) Kevin Strootman
- (Romania) Alexandru Chipciu
- (Romania) Valerică Găman
- (Romania) Gheorghe Grozav
- (Romania) Alexandru Maxim
- (Romania) Adrian Mutu
- (Romania) Mihai Pintilii
- (Romania) Cristian Tănase
- (Romania) Claudiu Keșerü
- (Romania) Bogdan Stancu
- (Turkey) Emre Belözoğlu
- (Turkey) Arda Turan

1 own goal

- (Andorra) Ildefons Lima (against Hungary)
- (Hungary) Szilárd Devecseri (against Netherlands)
- (Estonia) Ragnar Klavan (against Hungary)

== Discipline ==
Pos	Player	Country	Booked	Sent off (straight red)	Suspended for match(es)	Reason
DF	Marc Vales	Andorra	3	1	vs Romania (11 September 2012)	Sent off in a 2014 World Cup qualifying match
DF	Enar Jääger	Estonia	2	1	vs Hungary (12 October 2012) vs Turkey (11 October 2013)	Sent off in a 2014 World Cup qualifying match Booked in two 2014 World Cup qualifying matches
MF	Balázs Dzsudzsák	Hungary	2	0	vs Turkey (16 October 2012)	Booked in two 2014 World Cup qualifying matches
DF	Roland Juhász	Hungary	2	0	vs Turkey (16 October 2012)	Booked in two 2014 World Cup qualifying matches
MF	Hamit Altıntop	Turkey	2	0	vs Andorra (22 March 2013)	Booked in two 2014 World Cup qualifying matches
DF	Dorin Goian	Romania	2	0	vs Netherlands (26 March 2013)	Booked in two 2014 World Cup qualifying matches
MF	Victor Moreira	Andorra	2	0	vs Turkey (6 September 2013)	Booked in two 2014 World Cup qualifying matches
DF	Bekir İrtegün	Turkey	2	0	vs Andorra (6 September 2013)	Booked in two 2014 World Cup qualifying matches
MF	Aleksandr Dmitrijev	Estonia	2	0	vs Hungary (10 September 2013)	Booked in two 2014 World Cup qualifying matches
DF	Raio Piiroja	Estonia	2	1	vs Hungary (10 September 2013)	Sent off in a 2014 World Cup qualifying match
MF	Konstantin Vassiljev	Estonia	2	0	vs Hungary (10 September 2013)	Booked in two 2014 World Cup qualifying matches
DF	Zsolt Korcsmar	Hungary	2	0	vs Estonia (10 September 2013)	Booked in two 2014 World Cup qualifying matches
DF	Bruno Martins Indi	Netherlands	3	0	vs Andorra (10 September 2013)	Booked in two 2014 World Cup qualifying matches
MF	Arjen Robben	Netherlands	2	0	vs Andorra (10 September 2013)	Booked in two 2014 World Cup qualifying matches
MF	Alexandru Bourceanu	Romania	2	0	vs Turkey (10 September 2013)	Booked in two 2014 World Cup qualifying matches
DF	Răzvan Raț	Romania	2	0	vs Andorra (11 October 2013)	Booked in two 2014 World Cup qualifying matches
DF	Moisés San Nicolás	Andorra	4	1	vs Romania (11 October 2013)	Booked in two 2014 World Cup qualifying matches Sent off in a 2014 World Cup qualifying match
DF	Ildefonso Lima	Andorra	2	0	vs Romania (11 October 2013)	Booked in two 2014 World Cup qualifying matches
MF	Ats Purje	Estonia	2	0	vs Turkey (11 October 2013)	Booked in two 2014 World Cup qualifying matches
MF	Josep Ayala	Andorra	2	0	vs Hungary (15 October 2013)	Booked in two 2014 World Cup qualifying matches
ST	Marc Pujol	Andorra	2	0	vs Hungary (15 October 2013)	Booked in two 2014 World Cup qualifying matches
DF	Vlad Chiricheș	Romania	2	0	vs Estonia (15 October 2013)	Booked in two 2014 World Cup qualifying matches
MF	Nigel de Jong	Netherlands	2	0	vs Turkey (15 October 2013)	Booked in two 2014 World Cup qualifying matches
DF	Richárd Guzmics	Hungary	2	0	vs Andorra (15 October 2013)	Booked in two 2014 World Cup qualifying matches
DF	Caner Erkin	Turkey	2	0	vs Netherlands (15 October 2013)	Booked in two 2014 World Cup qualifying matches
DF	Daley Blind	Netherlands	2	0	TBD (2014)	Booked in two 2014 World Cup qualifying matches
