= 2014 FIFA World Cup qualification – UEFA Group E =

Football tournament qualification stage

The 2014 FIFA World Cup qualification UEFA Group E was a UEFA qualifying group for the 2014 FIFA World Cup. The group comprised Norway, Slovenia, Switzerland, Albania, Cyprus and Iceland.

The group winners, Switzerland, qualified directly for the 2014 FIFA World Cup. Iceland placed among the eight best runners-up and advanced to the play-offs, where they were drawn to play home-and-away matches against Croatia. However, they failed to qualify for the World Cup after drawing the first match and losing the second.

== Standings ==
Pos	Team	Pld	W	D	L	GF	GA	GD	Pts	Qualification	Switzerland national football team	Iceland national football team	Slovenia national football team	Norway national football team	Albania national football team	Cyprus national football team
1	Switzerland	10	7	3	0	17	6	+11	24	Qualification to 2014 FIFA World Cup	—	4–4	1–0	1–1	2–0	1–0
2	Iceland	10	5	2	3	17	15	+2	17	Advance to second round	0–2	—	2–4	2–0	2–1	2–0
3	Slovenia	10	5	0	5	14	11	+3	15		0–2	1–2	—	3–0	1–0	2–1
4	Norway	10	3	3	4	10	13	−3	12		0–2	1–1	2–1	—	0–1	2–0
5	Albania	10	3	2	5	9	11	−2	11		1–2	1–2	1–0	1–1	—	3–1
6	Cyprus	10	1	2	7	4	15	−11	5		0–0	1–0	0–2	1–3	0–0	—

== Matches ==
A meeting was held in Zürich, Switzerland, on 22 November 2011 to determine the schedule. The delegates failed to reach agreement on the fixtures, which were then determined by a random draw at the conclusion of the meeting.

7 September 2012
20:30 UTC+2

Albania	3–1	Cyprus
Sadiku 36'; Çani 84'; Bogdani 87'	Report	Laban 45+5'

Stadiumi Qemal Stafa, Tirana
Attendance: 19,400
Referee: Artyom Kuchin (Kazakhstan)
7 September 2012
20:30 UTC+2

Slovenia	0–2	Switzerland
	Report	Xhaka 20'; Inler 51'

Stožice, Ljubljana
Attendance: 13,213
Referee: Paolo Tagliavento (Italy)
7 September 2012
18:45 UTC±0

Iceland	2–0	Norway
Árnason 22'; Finnbogason 81'	Report

Laugardalsvöllur, Reykjavík
Attendance: 8,352
Referee: Anthony Gautier (France)

11 September 2012
20:00 UTC+3

Cyprus	1–0	Iceland
Makrides 58'	Report

Antonis Papadopoulos Stadium, Larnaca
Attendance: 1,600
Referee: Sébastien Delferiere (Belgium)
11 September 2012
20:00 UTC+2

Norway	2–1	Slovenia
Henriksen 26'; J. A. Riise 90+3' (pen.)	Report	Šuler 16'

Ullevaal Stadion, Oslo
Attendance: 11,168
Referee: Fırat Aydınus (Turkey)
11 September 2012
20:30 UTC+2

Switzerland	2–0	Albania
Shaqiri 23'; Inler 68' (pen.)	Report

Swissporarena, Lucerne
Attendance: 16,500
Referee: Ovidiu Alin Hategan (Romania)

12 October 2012
19:00 UTC+2

Albania	1–2	Iceland
Çani 28'	Report	Bjarnason 19'; Sigurðsson 81'

Stadiumi Qemal Stafa, Tirana
Attendance: 8,200
Referee: Tony Asumaa (Finland)
12 October 2012
20:30 UTC+2

Switzerland	1–1	Norway
Gavranović 79'	Report	Hangeland 81'

Stade de Suisse, Bern
Attendance: 30,712
Referee: David Fernández Borbalán (Spain)
12 October 2012
20:45 UTC+2

Slovenia	2–1	Cyprus
Matavž 38', 61'	Report	Aloneftis 83'

Ljudski vrt, Maribor
Attendance: 7,988
Referee: Ivan Kružliak (Slovakia)

16 October 2012
21:00 UTC+3

Cyprus	1–3	Norway
Aloneftis 42'	Report	Hangeland 45'; Elyounoussi 81' (pen.); King 83'

Antonis Papadopoulos Stadium, Larnaca
Attendance: 2,493
Referee: Paweł Gil (Poland)
16 October 2012
18:30 UTC±0

Iceland	0–2	Switzerland
	Report	Barnetta 66'; Gavranović 79'

Laugardalsvöllur, Reykjavík
Attendance: 8,369
Referee: Alan Kelly (Republic of Ireland)
16 October 2012
20:45 UTC+2

Albania	1–0	Slovenia
Roshi 37'	Report

Stadiumi Qemal Stafa, Tirana
Attendance: 18,000
Referee: Martin Hansson (Sweden)

22 March 2013
18:00 UTC+1

Slovenia	1–2	Iceland
Novaković 34'	Report	Sigurðsson 55', 78'

Stožice, Ljubljana
Attendance: 6,500
Referee: Stavros Tritsonis (Greece)
22 March 2013
19:00 UTC+1

Norway	0–1	Albania
	Report	Salihi 66'

Ullevaal Stadion, Oslo
Attendance: 11,207
Referee: Kevin Blom (Netherlands)
23 March 2013
18:30 UTC+2

Cyprus	0–0	Switzerland
	Report

GSP Stadium, Nicosia
Attendance: 2,045
Referee: Manuel Gräfe (Germany)

7 June 2013
20:30 UTC+2

Albania	1–1	Norway
Rama 40'	Report	Høgli 87'

Stadiumi Qemal Stafa, Tirana
Attendance: 21,600
Referee: William Collum (Scotland)
7 June 2013
19:00 UTC±0

Iceland	2–4	Slovenia
Bjarnason 22'; Finnbogason 26' (pen.)	Report	Kirm 11'; Birsa 31' (pen.); Cesar 61'; Krhin 86'

Laugardalsvöllur, Reykjavík
Attendance: 9,202
Referee: Felix Zwayer (Germany)
8 June 2013
17:30 UTC+2

Switzerland	1–0	Cyprus
Seferovic 90'	Report

Stade de Genève, Geneva
Attendance: 16,900
Referee: Paolo Mazzoleni (Italy)

6 September 2013
19:00 UTC+2

Norway	2–0	Cyprus
Elyounoussi 43'; King 66'	Report

Ullevaal Stadion, Oslo
Attendance: 11,295
Referee: Kenn Hansen (Denmark)
6 September 2013
20:30 UTC+2

Slovenia	1–0	Albania
Kampl 19'	Report

Stožice, Ljubljana
Attendance: 13,843
Referee: István Vad (Hungary)
6 September 2013
20:30 UTC+2

Switzerland	4–4	Iceland
Lichtsteiner 15', 30'; Schär 27'; Džemaili 54' (pen.)	Report	Guðmundsson 3', 68', 90+1'; Sigþórsson 56'

Stade de Suisse, Bern
Attendance: 26,000
Referee: Sergei Karasev (Russia)

10 September 2013
19:00 UTC+2

Norway	0–2	Switzerland
	Report	Schär 12', 51'

Ullevaal Stadion, Oslo
Attendance: 16,631
Referee: Howard Webb (England)
10 September 2013
21:30 UTC+3

Cyprus	0–2	Slovenia
	Report	Novaković 12'; Iličić 80'

GSP Stadium, Nicosia
Attendance: 714
Referee: Ruddy Buquet (France)
10 September 2013
19:00 UTC±0

Iceland	2–1	Albania
Bjarnason 13'; Sigþórsson 47'	Report	Rama 9'

Laugardalsvöllur, Reykjavík
Attendance: 9,768
Referee: Andre Marriner (England)

11 October 2013
20:30 UTC+2

Albania	1–2	Switzerland
Salihi 89' (pen.)	Report	Shaqiri 47'; Lang 77'

Stadiumi Qemal Stafa, Tirana
Attendance: 17,000
Referee: Pedro Proença (Portugal)
11 October 2013
18:45 UTC±0

Iceland	2–0	Cyprus
Sigþórsson 60'; Sigurðsson 76'	Report

Laugardalsvöllur, Reykjavík
Attendance: 9,767
Referee: István Vad (Hungary)
11 October 2013
20:45 UTC+2

Slovenia	3–0	Norway
Novaković 13', 14', 49'	Report

Ljudski vrt, Maribor
Attendance: 10,890
Referee: Carlos Velasco Carballo (Spain)

15 October 2013
19:00 UTC+3

Cyprus	0–0	Albania
	Report

GSP Stadium, Nicosia
Attendance: 341
Referee: Ivan Bebek (Croatia)
15 October 2013
20:00 UTC+2

Norway	1–1	Iceland
Braaten 30'	Report	Sigþórsson 12'

Ullevaal Stadion, Oslo
Attendance: 6,796
Referee: Paolo Tagliavento (Italy)
15 October 2013
20:00 UTC+2

Switzerland	1–0	Slovenia
Xhaka 74'	Report

Stade de Suisse, Bern
Attendance: 22,014
Referee: Björn Kuipers (Netherlands)

== Goalscorers ==
There were 71 goals scored in 30 matches, for an average of 2.37 goals per match.

5 goals

- (Slovenia) Milivoje Novaković

4 goals

- (Iceland) Gylfi Sigurðsson
- (Iceland) Kolbeinn Sigþórsson

3 goals

- (Iceland) Birkir Bjarnason
- (Iceland) Jóhann Berg Guðmundsson
- (Switzerland) Fabian Schär

2 goals

- (Albania) Edgar Çani
- (Albania) Valdet Rama
- (Albania) Hamdi Salihi
- (Cyprus) Efstathios Aloneftis
- (Iceland) Alfreð Finnbogason
- (Norway) Tarik Elyounoussi
- (Norway) Brede Hangeland
- (Norway) Joshua King
- (Slovenia) Tim Matavž
- (Switzerland) Xherdan Shaqiri
- (Switzerland) Mario Gavranović
- (Switzerland) Gökhan Inler
- (Switzerland) Stephan Lichtsteiner
- (Switzerland) Granit Xhaka

1 goal

- (Albania) Erjon Bogdani
- (Albania) Odise Roshi
- (Albania) Armando Sadiku
- (Cyprus) Vincent Laban
- (Cyprus) Constantinos Makrides
- (Iceland) Kári Árnason
- (Norway) Daniel Braaten
- (Norway) Markus Henriksen
- (Norway) Tom Høgli
- (Norway) John Arne Riise
- (Slovenia) Valter Birsa
- (Slovenia) Boštjan Cesar
- (Slovenia) Josip Iličić
- (Slovenia) Kevin Kampl
- (Slovenia) Andraž Kirm
- (Slovenia) Rene Krhin
- (Slovenia) Marko Šuler
- (Switzerland) Tranquillo Barnetta
- (Switzerland) Blerim Džemaili
- (Switzerland) Michael Lang
- (Switzerland) Haris Seferovic

== Discipline ==
Pos	Player	Country	Booked	Sent off (straight red)	Suspended for match(es)	Reason
DF	Boštjan Cesar	Slovenia	4	1	vs Albania (16 October 2012)	Sent off in a 2014 World Cup qualifying match
MF	Tranquillo Barnetta	Switzerland	2	1	vs Albania (11 September 2012)	Sent off in a 2014 World Cup qualifying match
DF	Andi Lila	Albania	2	1	vs Norway (7 June 2013)	Sent off in a 2014 World Cup qualifying match
DF	Sölvi Ottesen	Iceland	1	1	vs Albania (12 October 2012)	Sent off in a 2014 World Cup qualifying match
DF	Espen Ruud	Norway	4	0	vs Albania (22 March 2013) vs Slovenia (11 October 2013)	Booked in two 2014 World Cup qualifying matches Booked in two 2014 World Cup qualifying matches
FW	Vincent Laban	Cyprus	3	0	vs Slovenia (12 October 2012)	Booked in two 2014 World Cup qualifying matches
MF	Aron Gunnarsson	Iceland	3	0	vs Switzerland (16 October 2012)	Booked in two 2014 World Cup qualifying matches
FW	Eren Derdiyok	Switzerland	2	0	vs Iceland (16 October 2012)	Booked in two 2014 World Cup qualifying matches
DF	Valentinos Sielis	Cyprus	2	0	vs Norway (16 October 2012)	Booked in two 2014 World Cup qualifying matches
DF	Kári Árnason	Iceland	3	0	vs Slovenia (22 March 2013)	Booked in two 2014 World Cup qualifying matches
MF	Rúrik Gíslason	Iceland	2	0	vs Slovenia (22 March 2013)	Booked in two 2014 World Cup qualifying matches
DF	Grétar Steinsson	Iceland	2	0	vs Slovenia (22 March 2013)	Booked in two 2014 World Cup qualifying matches
MF	Josip Iličić	Slovenia	2	0	vs Iceland (22 March 2013)	Booked in two 2014 World Cup qualifying matches
MF	Andraž Kirm	Slovenia	3	0	vs Iceland (22 March 2013)	Booked in two 2014 World Cup qualifying matches
MF	Daniel Braaten	Norway	2	0	vs Albania (22 March 2013)	Booked in two 2014 World Cup qualifying matches
MF	Jóhann Berg Guðmundsson	Iceland	2	0	vs Slovenia (7 June 2013)	Booked in two 2014 World Cup qualifying matches
MF	Gylfi Sigurðsson	Iceland	3	0	vs Slovenia (7 June 2013)	Booked in two 2014 World Cup qualifying matches
MF	Lorik Cana	Albania	4	0	vs Norway (7 June 2013)	Booked in two 2014 World Cup qualifying matches
MF	Odise Roshi	Albania	2	0	vs Norway (7 June 2013)	Booked in two 2014 World Cup qualifying matches
DF	Armend Dallku	Albania	3	0	vs Slovenia (6 September 2013)	Booked in two 2014 World Cup qualifying matches
MF	Gökhan Inler	Switzerland	2	0	vs Iceland (6 September 2013)	Booked in two 2014 World Cup qualifying matches
DF	Elias Charalambous	Cyprus	2	0	vs Norway (6 September 2013)	Booked in two 2014 World Cup qualifying matches
MF	Konstantinos Makridis	Cyprus	2	0	vs Norway (6 September 2013)	Booked in two 2014 World Cup qualifying matches
MF	Efstathios Aloneftis	Cyprus	3	0	vs Slovenia (10 September 2013)	Booked in two 2014 World Cup qualifying matches
MF	Jasmin Kurtić	Slovenia	2	0	vs Cyprus (10 September 2013)	Booked in two 2014 World Cup qualifying matches
MF	Ansi Agolli	Albania	2	0	vs Iceland (10 September 2013)	Booked in two 2014 World Cup qualifying matches
MF	Giorgos Merkis	Cyprus	2	0	vs Albania (15 October 2013)	Booked in two 2014 World Cup qualifying matches
DF	Steve von Bergen	Switzerland	2	0	vs Slovenia (15 October 2013)	Booked in two 2014 World Cup qualifying matches

== Attendances ==
Team	Highest	Lowest	Average
Albania	15,600	8,200	11,240
Cyprus	2,493	342	1,439
Iceland	9,768	8,352	9,091
Norway	16,631	6,796	11,420
Switzerland	30,712	16,500	22,425
Slovenia	13,843	6,500	10,487
