= 2014 FIFA World Cup qualification – UEFA Group I =

The 2014 FIFA World Cup qualification UEFA Group I was a UEFA qualifying group for the 2014 FIFA World Cup. The group comprised 2010 FIFA World Cup winners Spain, along with France, Belarus, Georgia and Finland.

Spain won the group and thus qualified directly for the 2014 FIFA World Cup. France ranked among the eight best runners-up and advanced to the play-offs, where they were drawn to play home-and-away matches against Ukraine. After losing the first match by two goals, they won the second by three, thus qualifying for the World Cup.

== Standings ==
Pos	Team	Pld	W	D	L	GF	GA	GD	Pts	Qualification	Spain national football team	France national football team	Finland national football team	Georgia national football team	Belarus national football team
1	Spain	8	6	2	0	14	3	+11	20	Qualification to 2014 FIFA World Cup	—	1–1	1–1	2–0	2–1
2	France	8	5	2	1	15	6	+9	17	Advance to second round	0–1	—	3–0	3–1	3–1
3	Finland	8	2	3	3	5	9	−4	9		0–2	0–1	—	1–1	1–0
4	Georgia	8	1	2	5	3	10	−7	5		0–1	0–0	0–1	—	1–0
5	Belarus	8	1	1	6	7	16	−9	4		0–4	2–4	1–1	2–0	—

== Matches ==
The fixtures were decided at a meeting held in Paris, France, on 23 September 2011.

7 September 2012
21:00 UTC+4

Georgia	1–0	Belarus
Okriashvili 52'	Report

Dinamo Arena, Tbilisi
Attendance: 20,000
Referee: Stanislav Todorov (Bulgaria)
7 September 2012
21:30 UTC+3

Finland	0–1	France
	Report	Diaby 20'

Olympiastadion, Helsinki
Attendance: 35,111
Referee: Craig Thomson (Scotland)

11 September 2012
21:30 UTC+4

Georgia	0–1	Spain
	Report	Soldado 86'

Dinamo Arena, Tbilisi
Attendance: 54,598
Referee: Svein Oddvar Moen (Norway)
11 September 2012
21:00 UTC+2

France	3–1	Belarus
Capoue 49'; Jallet 68'; Ribéry 80'	Report	Putsila 72'

Stade de France, Saint-Denis
Attendance: 52,552
Referee: Hüseyin Göçek (Turkey)

12 October 2012
18:30 UTC+3

Finland	1–1	Georgia
Hämäläinen 62'	Report	Kashia 56'

Olympiastadion, Helsinki
Attendance: 12,607
Referee: Yevhen Aranovskiy (Ukraine)
12 October 2012
21:00 UTC+3

Belarus	0–4	Spain
	Report	Alba 12'; Pedro 21', 69', 79'

Dynama Stadium, Minsk
Attendance: 28,800
Referee: Serge Gumienny (Belgium)

16 October 2012
19:00 UTC+3

Belarus	2–0	Georgia
Bressan 6'; Drahun 28'	Report

Dynama Stadium, Minsk
Attendance: 15,300
Referee: Robert Schörgenhofer (Austria)
16 October 2012
21:00 UTC+2

Spain	1–1	France
Ramos 25'	Report	Giroud 90+4'

Vicente Calderón, Madrid
Attendance: 46,825
Referee: Felix Brych (Germany)

22 March 2013
20:45 UTC+1

Spain	1–1	Finland
Ramos 49'	Report	Pukki 79'

El Molinón, Gijón
Attendance: 27,637
Referee: Ovidiu Hațegan (Romania)
22 March 2013
21:00 UTC+1

France	3–1	Georgia
Giroud 45+1'; Valbuena 47'; Ribéry 61'	Report	Kobakhidze 71'

Stade de France, Saint-Denis
Attendance: 71,147
Referee: Ivan Bebek (Croatia)

26 March 2013
21:00 UTC+1

France	0–1	Spain
	Report	Pedro 58'

Stade de France, Saint-Denis
Attendance: 78,329
Referee: Viktor Kassai (Hungary)

7 June 2013
19:00 UTC+3

Finland	1–0	Belarus
Shitov 57' (o.g.)	Report

Olympiastadion, Helsinki
Attendance: 24,916
Referee: Eli Hacmon (Israel)

11 June 2013
20:00 UTC+3

Belarus	1–1	Finland
Verkhovtsov 85'	Report	Pukki 24'

Central Stadium, Gomel
Attendance: 10,100
Referee: Libor Kovařík (Czech Republic)

6 September 2013
22:15 UTC+4

Georgia	0–0	France
	Report

Dinamo Arena, Tbilisi
Attendance: 26,360
Referee: Fırat Aydınus (Turkey)
6 September 2013
21:30 UTC+3

Finland	0–2	Spain
	Report	Alba 19'; Negredo 86'

Olympiastadion, Helsinki
Attendance: 37,492
Referee: Ivan Bebek (Croatia)

10 September 2013
21:00 UTC+4

Georgia	0–1	Finland
	Report	R. Eremenko 74' (pen.)

Mikheil Meskhi Stadium, Tbilisi
Attendance: 25,321
Referee: Leontios Trattou (Cyprus)
10 September 2013
22:00 UTC+3

Belarus	2–4	France
Filipenko 32'; Kalachev 57'	Report	Ribéry 47' (pen.), 64'; Nasri 71'; Pogba 73'

Central Stadium, Gomel
Attendance: 12,203
Referee: Daniele Orsato (Italy)

11 October 2013
22:00 UTC+2

Spain	2–1	Belarus
Xavi 61'; Negredo 78'	Report	Kornilenko 89'

Iberostar, Palma
Attendance: 22,900
Referee: Bas Nijhuis (Netherlands)

15 October 2013
21:00 UTC+2

France	3–0	Finland
Ribéry 8'; Toivio 75' (o.g.); Benzema 87'	Report

Stade de France, Saint-Denis
Attendance: 70,156
Referee: Michael Koukoulakis (Greece)
15 October 2013
21:00 UTC+2

Spain	2–0	Georgia
Negredo 26'; Mata 61'	Report

Carlos Belmonte, Albacete
Attendance: 16,133
Referee: Florian Meyer (Germany)

== Goalscorers ==
There were 44 goals scored in 20 matches, for an average of 2.2 goals per match.

5 goals

- (France) Franck Ribéry

4 goals

- (Spain) Pedro

3 goals

- (Spain) Álvaro Negredo

2 goals

- (Finland) Teemu Pukki
- (France) Olivier Giroud
- (Spain) Jordi Alba
- (Spain) Sergio Ramos

1 goal

- (Belarus) Renan Bressan
- (Belarus) Stanislaw Drahun
- (Belarus) Egor Filipenko
- (Belarus) Timofei Kalachev
- (Belarus) Anton Putsila
- (Belarus) Dmitry Verkhovtsov
- (Belarus) Sergei Kornilenko
- (Finland) Roman Eremenko
- (Finland) Kasper Hämäläinen
- (France) Karim Benzema
- (France) Étienne Capoue
- (France) Abou Diaby
- (France) Christophe Jallet
- (France) Samir Nasri
- (France) Paul Pogba
- (France) Mathieu Valbuena
- (Georgia (country)) Guram Kashia
- (Georgia (country)) Alexander Kobakhidze
- (Georgia (country)) Tornike Okriashvili
- (Spain) Juan Mata
- (Spain) Roberto Soldado
- (Spain) Xavi

1 own goal

- (Belarus) Igor Shitov (against Finland)
- (Finland) Joona Toivio (against France)

== Discipline ==
Pos	Player	Country	Booked	Sent off (straight red)	Suspended for match(es)	Reason
MF	Alexei Eremenko	Finland	2	1	vs Spain (22 March 2013)	Sent off in a 2014 World Cup qualifying match
MF	Paul Pogba	France	2	1	vs Georgia (6 September 2013)	Sent off in a 2014 World Cup qualifying match
MF	Pavel Nekhaichik	Belarus	2	1	vs Finland (11 June 2013)	Sent off in a 2014 World Cup qualifying match
DF	Mapou Yanga-Mbiwa	France	2	0	vs Spain (16 October 2012)	Booked in two 2014 World Cup qualifying matches
MF	Jaba Kankava	Georgia	4	1	vs France (22 March 2013) vs Spain (15 October 2013)	Booked in two 2014 World Cup qualifying matches Sent off in a 2014 World Cup qualifying match
MF	Tornike Okriashvili	Georgia	3	0	vs France (22 March 2013)	Booked in two 2014 World Cup qualifying matches
FW	David Silva	Spain	2	0	vs France (26 March 2013)	Booked in two 2014 World Cup qualifying matches
DF	Niklas Moisander	Finland	2	0	vs Belarus (7 June 2013)	Booked in two 2014 World Cup qualifying matches
DF	Markus Halsti	Finland	2	0	vs Belarus (11 June 2013)	Booked in two 2014 World Cup qualifying matches
MF	Yohan Cabaye	France	2	0	vs Georgia (6 September 2013)	Booked in two 2014 World Cup qualifying matches
MF	Blaise Matuidi	France	2	0	vs Georgia (6 September 2013)	Booked in two 2014 World Cup qualifying matches
MF	Përparim Hetemaj	Finland	3	0	vs Spain (6 September 2013)	Booked in two 2014 World Cup qualifying matches
GK	Giorgi Loria	Georgia	2	0	vs Finland (10 September 2013)	Booked in two 2014 World Cup qualifying matches
MF	David Targamadze	Georgia	2	0	vs Spain (15 October 2013)	Booked in two 2014 World Cup qualifying matches
DF	Gia Grigalava	Georgia	2	0	vs Spain (15 October 2013)	Booked in two 2014 World Cup qualifying matches
MF	Tim Sparv	Finland	2	0	vs France (15 October 2013)	Booked in two 2014 World Cup qualifying matches
