= 2014 FIFA World Cup qualification (UEFA) =

Tournament details
- Dates: 7 September 2012 – 19 November 2013
- Teams: 53 (from 1 confederation)

Tournament statistics
- Matches played: 268
- Goals scored: 749 (2.79 per match)
- Attendance: 6,145,801 (22,932 per match)
- Top scorer(s): (Netherlands) Robin van Persie (11 goals)

The European zone of qualification for the 2014 FIFA World Cup saw 53 teams competing for 13 places in the finals in Brazil. The draw for the qualification groups was held during the World Cup Preliminary Draw at the Marina da Glória in Rio de Janeiro, Brazil, on 30 July 2011.

The qualification format was the same as 2010. The teams were drawn into eight groups of six teams and one group of five, with the nine group winners qualifying directly for the final tournament. The eight best runners-up (determined by records against the first-, third-, fourth- and fifth-placed teams in their groups to ensure equity between different groups) were drawn in two-legged play-offs that determined the remaining four qualifying nations.

The qualification process started on 7 September 2012, over two months after the end of UEFA Euro 2012, and ended on 19 November 2013. Belgium, Bosnia and Herzegovina, England, Germany, Italy, Netherlands, Russia, Spain, and Switzerland qualified in the first round by winning their groups. Croatia, France, Greece, and Portugal qualified via the second round play-offs.

== Format ==
All 53 UEFA national teams entered qualification, aiming to secure one of the 13 European Zone slots for the 2014 FIFA World Cup. The draw for the qualification groups was held at the World Cup Preliminary Draw at the Marina da Glória in Rio de Janeiro, Brazil, on 30 July 2011. The qualification format was the same as 2010. The teams were drawn into eight groups of six teams and one group of five, with the nine group winners qualifying directly for the final tournament. The eight best runners-up (determined by records against the first-, third-, fourth- and fifth-placed teams in their groups to ensure equity between different groups) were drawn in two-legged play-offs that determined the remaining four qualifying nations.

== Seeding ==
The July 2011 FIFA World Rankings were used to seed the teams. In consideration of the delicate political situations of the relationships between Armenia and Azerbaijan as well as relations between Russia and Georgia, UEFA requested that FIFA maintain the current UEFA policy not to draw these teams into the same qualification groups – although as Armenia and Azerbaijan were in the same pot they could not be drawn together anyway. The mechanism for keeping Russia and Georgia apart was confirmed by the FIFA Organising Committee on 29 July 2011.

Pot A
Team	Rank
Spain	1
Netherlands	2
Germany	3
England	6
Portugal	7
Italy	8
Croatia	9
Norway	12
Greece	13

Pot D
Team	Rank
Bulgaria	48
Romania	53
Georgia	57
Lithuania	58
Albania	59
Scotland	61
Northern Ireland	62
Austria	66
Poland	69

Pot B
Team	Rank
France	16
Montenegro	17
Russia	18
Sweden	19
Denmark	21
Slovenia	22
Turkey	24
Serbia	27
Slovakia	29

Pot E
Team	Rank
Armenia	70
Finland	75
Estonia	79
Cyprus	80
Latvia	84
Moldova	85
Macedonia	96
Azerbaijan	111
Faroe Islands	112

Pot C
Team	Rank
Switzerland	30
Israel	32
Republic of Ireland	33
Belgium	37
Czech Republic	38
Bosnia and Herzegovina	41
Belarus	42
Ukraine	45
Hungary	47

Pot F
Team	Rank
Wales	112
Liechtenstein	118
Iceland	121
Kazakhstan	126
Luxembourg	128
Malta	173
Andorra	203
San Marino	203

== First round ==
The matches were played between 7 September 2012 and 15 October 2013. An initial schedule that includes matches before this date was not ratified by FIFA. A win was awarded 3 points, a draw was awarded 1 point, and a loss 0. The team with the most points in each group secured direct qualification for the final tournament of the World Cup.

=== Summary ===
Winner of each group qualified directly for the 2014 FIFA World Cup
The eight best runners-up among all nine groups advanced to the second round (play-offs)
Other teams were eliminated after the first round

Group A	Group B	Group C	Group D	Group E	Group F	Group G	Group H	Group I
Belgium	Italy	Germany	Netherlands	Switzerland	Russia	Bosnia and Herzegovina	England	Spain
Croatia	Denmark	Sweden	Romania	Iceland	Portugal	Greece	Ukraine	France
Serbia Scotland Wales Macedonia	Czech Republic Bulgaria Armenia Malta	Austria Republic of Ireland Kazakhstan Faroe Islands	Hungary Turkey Estonia Andorra	Slovenia Norway Albania Cyprus	Israel Azerbaijan Northern Ireland Luxembourg	Slovakia Lithuania Latvia Liechtenstein	Montenegro Poland Moldova San Marino	Finland Georgia Belarus

=== Groups ===
==== Tie-breaking criteria ====
If two teams had the same number of points the criteria below were used.

Tie-breaking criteria for group play
The ranking in each group is determined as follows:
- a) greatest number of points obtained in all group matches;
- b) goal difference in all group matches;
- c) greatest number of goals scored in all group matches.

If two or more teams are equal on the basis of the above three criteria, their rankings shall be determined as follows:

- d) greatest number of points obtained in the group matches between the teams concerned;
- e) goal difference resulting from the group matches between the teams concerned;
- f) greater number of goals scored in all group matches between the teams concerned;
- g) greater number of goals scored away from home between the teams concerned (if the tie is only between two teams)

=== Group A ===
Pos	Team	Pld	W	D	L	GF	GA	GD	Pts	Qualification	Belgium national football team	Croatia national football team	Serbia national football team	Scotland national football team	Wales national football team	North Macedonia national football team
1	Belgium	10	8	2	0	18	4	+14	26	Qualification to 2014 FIFA World Cup	—	1–1	2–1	2–0	1–1	1–0
2	Croatia	10	5	2	3	12	9	+3	17	Advance to second round	1–2	—	2–0	0–1	2–0	1–0
3	Serbia	10	4	2	4	18	11	+7	14		0–3	1–1	—	2–0	6–1	5–1
4	Scotland	10	3	2	5	8	12	−4	11		0–2	2–0	0–0	—	1–2	1–1
5	Wales	10	3	1	6	9	20	−11	10		0–2	1–2	0–3	2–1	—	1–0
6	Macedonia	10	2	1	7	7	16	−9	7		0–2	1–2	1–0	1–2	2–1	—

=== Group B ===
Pos	Team	Pld	W	D	L	GF	GA	GD	Pts	Qualification	Italy national football team	Denmark national football team	Czech Republic national football team	Bulgaria national football team	Armenia national football team	Malta national football team
1	Italy	10	6	4	0	19	9	+10	22	Qualification to 2014 FIFA World Cup	—	3–1	2–1	1–0	2–2	2–0
2	Denmark	10	4	4	2	17	12	+5	16		2–2	—	0–0	1–1	0–4	6–0
3	Czech Republic	10	4	3	3	13	9	+4	15		0–0	0–3	—	0–0	1–2	3–1
4	Bulgaria	10	3	4	3	14	9	+5	13		2–2	1–1	0–1	—	1–0	6–0
5	Armenia	10	4	1	5	12	13	−1	13		1–3	0–1	0–3	2–1	—	0–1
6	Malta	10	1	0	9	5	28	−23	3		0–2	1–2	1–4	1–2	0–1	—

=== Group C ===
Pos	Team	Pld	W	D	L	GF	GA	GD	Pts	Qualification	Germany national football team	Sweden men's national football team	Austria national football team	Republic of Ireland national football team	Kazakhstan national football team	Faroe Islands national football team
1	Germany	10	9	1	0	36	10	+26	28	Qualification to 2014 FIFA World Cup	—	4–4	3–0	3–0	4–1	3–0
2	Sweden	10	6	2	2	19	14	+5	20	Advance to second round	3–5	—	2–1	0–0	2–0	2–0
3	Austria	10	5	2	3	20	10	+10	17		1–2	2–1	—	1–0	4–0	6–0
4	Republic of Ireland	10	4	2	4	16	17	−1	14		1–6	1–2	2–2	—	3–1	3–0
5	Kazakhstan	10	1	2	7	6	21	−15	5		0–3	0–1	0–0	1–2	—	2–1
6	Faroe Islands	10	0	1	9	4	29	−25	1		0–3	1–2	0–3	1–4	1–1	—

=== Group D ===
Pos	Team	Pld	W	D	L	GF	GA	GD	Pts	Qualification	Netherlands national football team	Romania national football team	Hungary national football team	Turkey national football team	Estonia national football team	Andorra national football team
1	Netherlands	10	9	1	0	34	5	+29	28	Qualification to 2014 FIFA World Cup	—	4–0	8–1	2–0	3–0	3–0
2	Romania	10	6	1	3	19	12	+7	19	Advance to second round	1–4	—	3–0	0–2	2–0	4–0
3	Hungary	10	5	2	3	21	20	+1	17		1–4	2–2	—	3–1	5–1	2–0
4	Turkey	10	5	1	4	16	9	+7	16		0–2	0–1	1–1	—	3–0	5–0
5	Estonia	10	2	1	7	6	20	−14	7		2–2	0–2	0–1	0–2	—	2–0
6	Andorra	10	0	0	10	0	30	−30	0		0–2	0–4	0–5	0–2	0–1	—

=== Group E ===
Pos	Team	Pld	W	D	L	GF	GA	GD	Pts	Qualification	Switzerland national football team	Iceland national football team	Slovenia national football team	Norway national football team	Albania national football team	Cyprus national football team
1	Switzerland	10	7	3	0	17	6	+11	24	Qualification to 2014 FIFA World Cup	—	4–4	1–0	1–1	2–0	1–0
2	Iceland	10	5	2	3	17	15	+2	17	Advance to second round	0–2	—	2–4	2–0	2–1	2–0
3	Slovenia	10	5	0	5	14	11	+3	15		0–2	1–2	—	3–0	1–0	2–1
4	Norway	10	3	3	4	10	13	−3	12		0–2	1–1	2–1	—	0–1	2–0
5	Albania	10	3	2	5	9	11	−2	11		1–2	1–2	1–0	1–1	—	3–1
6	Cyprus	10	1	2	7	4	15	−11	5		0–0	1–0	0–2	1–3	0–0	—

=== Group F ===
Pos	Team	Pld	W	D	L	GF	GA	GD	Pts	Qualification	Russia national football team	Portugal national football team	Israel national football team	Azerbaijan national football team	Northern Ireland national football team	Luxembourg national football team
1	Russia	10	7	1	2	20	5	+15	22	Qualification to 2014 FIFA World Cup	—	1–0	3–1	1–0	2–0	4–1
2	Portugal	10	6	3	1	20	9	+11	21	Advance to second round	1–0	—	1–1	3–0	1–1	3–0
3	Israel	10	3	5	2	19	14	+5	14		0–4	3–3	—	1–1	1–1	3–0
4	Azerbaijan	10	1	6	3	7	11	−4	9		1–1	0–2	1–1	—	2–0	1–1
5	Northern Ireland	10	1	4	5	9	17	−8	7		1–0	2–4	0–2	1–1	—	1–1
6	Luxembourg	10	1	3	6	7	26	−19	6		0–4	1–2	0–6	0–0	3–2	—

=== Group G ===
Pos	Team	Pld	W	D	L	GF	GA	GD	Pts	Qualification	Bosnia and Herzegovina national football team	Greece national football team	Slovakia national football team	Lithuania national football team	Latvia national football team	Liechtenstein national football team
1	Bosnia and Herzegovina	10	8	1	1	30	6	+24	25	Qualification to 2014 FIFA World Cup	—	3–1	0–1	3–0	4–1	4–1
2	Greece	10	8	1	1	12	4	+8	25	Advance to second round	0–0	—	1–0	2–0	1–0	2–0
3	Slovakia	10	3	4	3	11	10	+1	13		1–2	0–1	—	1–1	2–1	2–0
4	Lithuania	10	3	2	5	9	11	−2	11		0–1	0–1	1–1	—	2–0	2–0
5	Latvia	10	2	2	6	10	20	−10	8		0–5	1–2	2–2	2–1	—	2–0
6	Liechtenstein	10	0	2	8	4	25	−21	2		1–8	0–1	1–1	0–2	1–1	—

=== Group H ===
Pos	Team	Pld	W	D	L	GF	GA	GD	Pts	Qualification	England national football team	Ukraine national football team	Montenegro national football team	Poland national football team	Moldova national football team	San Marino national football team
1	England	10	6	4	0	31	4	+27	22	Qualification to 2014 FIFA World Cup	—	1–1	4–1	2–0	4–0	5–0
2	Ukraine	10	6	3	1	28	4	+24	21	Advance to second round	0–0	—	0–1	1–0	2–1	9–0
3	Montenegro	10	4	3	3	18	17	+1	15		1–1	0–4	—	2–2	2–5	3–0
4	Poland	10	3	4	3	18	12	+6	13		1–1	1–3	1–1	—	2–0	5–0
5	Moldova	10	3	2	5	12	17	−5	11		0–5	0–0	0–1	1–1	—	3–0
6	San Marino	10	0	0	10	1	54	−53	0		0–8	0–8	0–6	1–5	0–2	—

=== Group I ===
Pos	Team	Pld	W	D	L	GF	GA	GD	Pts	Qualification	Spain national football team	France national football team	Finland national football team	Georgia national football team	Belarus national football team
1	Spain	8	6	2	0	14	3	+11	20	Qualification to 2014 FIFA World Cup	—	1–1	1–1	2–0	2–1
2	France	8	5	2	1	15	6	+9	17	Advance to second round	0–1	—	3–0	3–1	3–1
3	Finland	8	2	3	3	5	9	−4	9		0–2	0–1	—	1–1	1–0
4	Georgia	8	1	2	5	3	10	−7	5		0–1	0–0	0–1	—	1–0
5	Belarus	8	1	1	6	7	16	−9	4		0–4	2–4	1–1	2–0	—

== Second round ==
=== Group runners-up ===
The eight best group runners-up contested the second round, where they were paired into four two-legged (home-and-away) fixtures. The four winners qualified for the 2014 FIFA World Cup. Because one group had one team fewer than the others, matches against the last-placed team in each of the six-team groups were not included in this ranking. Teams were ranked by the following parameters in order:

1. Highest number of points
2. Goal difference
3. Highest number of goals scored

Pos	Grp	Team	Pld	W	D	L	GF	GA	GD	Pts	Qualification
1	G	Greece	8	6	1	1	9	4	+5	19	Advance to second round (play-offs)
2	I	France	8	5	2	1	15	6	+9	17	Advance to second round (play-offs)
3	F	Portugal	8	4	3	1	15	8	+7	15	Advance to second round (play-offs)
4	H	Ukraine	8	4	3	1	11	4	+7	15	Advance to second round (play-offs)
5	C	Sweden	8	4	2	2	15	13	+2	14	Advance to second round (play-offs)
6	E	Iceland	8	4	2	2	15	14	+1	14	Advance to second round (play-offs)
7	D	Romania	8	4	1	3	11	12	−1	13	Advance to second round (play-offs)
8	A	Croatia	8	3	2	3	9	8	+1	11	Advance to second round (play-offs)
9	B	Denmark	8	2	4	2	9	11	−2	10	

=== Matches ===
The second round draw took place at the headquarters of FIFA in Zurich on 21 October 2013. The October 2013 FIFA World Rankings were used to decide which of the teams would be seeded (shown below in brackets).

Pot 1 (seeded)
Team	Pos
Portugal	14
Greece	15
Croatia	18
Ukraine	20

Pot 2 (unseeded)
Team	Pos
France	21
Sweden	25
Romania	29
Iceland	46

One team from pot 1 was paired with one from pot 2 as shown below. The matches were played on 15 and 19 November 2013. Winners: Portugal, France, Greece and Croatia as shown in bold.

Team 1	Agg.	Team 2	1st leg	2nd leg
**Portugal**	4–2	Sweden	1–0	3–2
Ukraine	2–3	**France**	2–0	0–3
**Greece**	4–2	Romania	3–1	1–1
Iceland	0–2	**Croatia**	0–0	0–2

== Qualified teams ==
The following 13 teams from UEFA qualified for the final tournament.

Team	Qualified as	Qualified on	Previous appearances in FIFA World Cup^{1}
Belgium	Group A winners	11 October 2013	11 (1930, 1934, 1938, 1954, 1970, 1982, 1986, 1990, 1994, 1998, 2002)
Italy	Group B winners	10 September 2013	17 (**1934**, **1938**, 1950, 1954, 1962, 1966, 1970, 1974, 1978, **1982**, 1986, 1990, 1994, 1998, 2002, **2006**, 2010)
Germany	Group C winners	11 October 2013	17 (1934, 1938, **1954**^{3}, 1958^{3}, 1962^{3}, 1966^{3}, 1970^{3}, **1974**^{3}, 1978^{3}, 1982^{3}, 1986^{3}, **1990**^{3}, 1994, 1998, 2002, 2006, 2010)
Netherlands	Group D winners	10 September 2013	9 (1934, 1938, 1974, 1978, 1990, 1994, 1998, 2006, 2010)
Switzerland	Group E winners	11 October 2013	9 (1934, 1938, 1950, 1954, 1962, 1966, 1994, 2006, 2010)
Russia	Group F winners	15 October 2013	9 (1958^{2}, 1962^{2}, 1966^{2}, 1970^{2}, 1982^{2}, 1986^{2}, 1990^{2}, 1994, 2002)
Bosnia and Herzegovina	Group G winners	15 October 2013	0 (debut)
England	Group H winners	15 October 2013	13 (1950, 1954, 1958, 1962, **1966**, 1970, 1982, 1986, 1990, 1998, 2002, 2006, 2010)
Spain	Group I winners	15 October 2013	13 (1934, 1950, 1962, 1966, 1978, 1982, 1986, 1990, 1994, 1998, 2002, 2006, **2010**)
Greece	Second round (play-off) winners	19 November 2013	2 (1994, 2010)
Croatia	Second round (play-off) winners	19 November 2013	3 (1998, 2002, 2006)
Portugal	Second round (play-off) winners	19 November 2013	5 (1966, 1986, 2002, 2006, 2010)
France	Second round (play-off) winners	19 November 2013	13 (1930, 1934, 1938, 1954, 1958, 1966, 1978, 1982, 1986, **1998**, 2002, 2006, 2010)

^{1} Bold indicates champions for that year. Italic indicates hosts for that year.
^{2} Competed as Soviet Union.
^{3} Competed as West Germany. A separate team for East Germany also participated in qualifications during this time, having only competed in 1974.

== Discipline ==
In the qualification tournament, a player would be suspended for the subsequent match in the competition for either getting red card or accumulating two yellow cards in two different matches. UEFA's Control and Disciplinary body has the ability to increase the automatic one match ban for a red card (e.g., for violent conduct). Single yellow card cautions would be erased prior to the play-off portion, and would not carry over. Single yellow cards and suspensions for yellow card accumulations do not carry over to the 2014 FIFA World Cup tournament matches. The following players were suspended during the final tournament – for one or more games – as a result of red cards or yellow card accumulations:

Player	Offences	Suspensions
(Republic of Ireland) Keith Andrews	(yellow card) (yellow-red card) UEFA Euro 2012 v Italy	Group C v Kazakhstan
(Armenia) Roman Berezovsky	(red card) UEFA Euro 2012 qualifying v Republic of Ireland	Group B v Malta
(Wales) James Collins	(red card) v Belgium	Group A v Serbia
(Andorra) Marc Vales	(yellow card) (yellow-red card) v Hungary	Group D v Romania
(Switzerland) Tranquillo Barnetta	(yellow card) (yellow-red card) v Slovenia	Group E v Albania
(Slovakia) Viktor Pečovský	(red card) v Lithuania	Group G v Liechtenstein
(Lithuania) Tadas Labukas	(yellow card) (yellow-red card) v Slovakia	Group G v Greece
(Montenegro) Savo Pavićević	(red card) v Poland	Group H v San Marino
(Poland) Ludovic Obraniak	(red card) v Montenegro	Group H v Moldova
(Bulgaria) Svetoslav Dyakov	(yellow card) (yellow-red card) v Armenia	Group B v Denmark
(Armenia) Gevorg Ghazaryan	(red card) v Bulgaria	Group B v Italy
(Armenia) Marcos Pizzelli	(red card) v Bulgaria	Group B v Italy
(Estonia) Enar Jääger	(red card) v Turkey	Group D v Hungary
(Iceland) Sölvi Ottesen	(red card) v Cyprus	Group E v Albania
(England) Steven Gerrard	(yellow card) (yellow-red card) v Ukraine	Group H v San Marino
(Finland) Alexei Eremenko	(yellow card) (yellow-red card) v Georgia	Group I v Spain
(Bulgaria) Ivan Bandalovski	(red card) v Denmark	Group B v Czech Republic
(Slovenia) Boštjan Cesar	(yellow card) (yellow-red card) v Cyprus	Group E v Albania
(Liechtenstein) Daniel Kaufmann	(yellow card) (yellow-red card) v Latvia	Group G v Latvia
(Serbia) Nenad Tomović	(red card) v Macedonia	Group A v Croatia
(Italy) Pablo Osvaldo	(red card) v Denmark	Group B v Malta
(Albania) Andi Lila	(yellow card) (yellow-red card) v Norway	Group E v Norway
(Spain) Gerard Piqué	(red card) 2013 FIFA Confederations Cup v Brazil	Group I v Finland
(Montenegro) Savo Pavicevic	(yellow card) (yellow-red card) v Ukraine	Group H v Poland
(Montenegro) Vladimir Volkov	(yellow card) (yellow-red card) v Ukraine	Group H v Poland
(Ukraine) Roman Zozulya	(red card) v Montenegro	Group H v San Marino
(Italy) Mario Balotelli	(yellow card) (yellow-red card) v Czech Republic	Group B v Bulgaria
(Sweden) Andreas Granqvist	(red card) v Faroe Islands	Group C v Republic of Ireland
(Croatia) Josip Šimunić	(red card) v Serbia	Group A v Belgium
(Croatia) Josip Šimunić	(red card) v Serbia	Group A v Scotland

== Top goalscorers ==
There were 749 goals scored in 268 matches, for an average of 2.79 goals per match.

11 goals

- (Netherlands) Robin van Persie

10 goals

- (Bosnia and Herzegovina) Edin Džeko

8 goals

- (Bosnia and Herzegovina) Vedad Ibišević
- (Germany) Mesut Özil
- (Portugal) Cristiano Ronaldo
- (Sweden) Zlatan Ibrahimović

7 goals

- (England) Wayne Rooney

6 goals

- (Austria) David Alaba
- (Republic of Ireland) Robbie Keane
- (Israel) Eden Ben Basat
- (Israel) Tomer Hemed
- (Portugal) Hélder Postiga

5 goals

- (Bosnia and Herzegovina) Zvjezdan Misimović
- (France) Franck Ribéry
- (Germany) Marco Reus
- (Greece) Kostas Mitroglou
- (Italy) Mario Balotelli
- (Netherlands) Jeremain Lens
- (Netherlands) Rafael van der Vaart
- (Romania) Ciprian Marica
- (Russia) Aleksandr Kerzhakov
- (Slovenia) Milivoje Novaković
- (Turkey) Umut Bulut
- (Turkey) Burak Yılmaz
- (Ukraine) Andriy Yarmolenko

Below are full goalscorer lists for all groups and the play-off rounds:

- Group A
- Group B
- Group C
- Group D
- Group E
- Group F
- Group G
- Group H
- Group I
- Play-offs
