= 2014 FIFA World Cup qualification – UEFA Group A =

Football tournament qualification stage

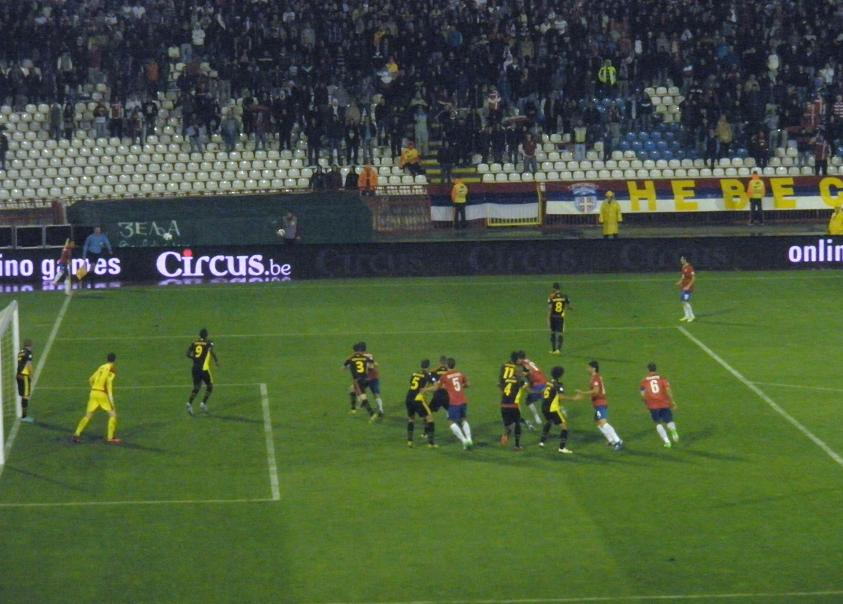
Serbia taking a corner versus Belgium in Belgrade in October 2012.

The 2014 FIFA World Cup Brazil qualification UEFA Group A was a UEFA qualifying group for the 2014 FIFA World Cup. The group comprised Belgium, Croatia, Macedonia, Scotland, Serbia and Wales.

The group winners, Belgium, qualified directly for the 2014 FIFA World Cup. Croatia placed among the eight best runners-up and advanced to the play-offs, where they were drawn to play home-and-away matches against Iceland. They drew the first match and won the second, thus also qualifying for the World Cup.

== Standings ==
Pos	Team	Pld	W	D	L	GF	GA	GD	Pts	Qualification	Belgium national football team	Croatia national football team	Serbia national football team	Scotland national football team	Wales national football team	North Macedonia national football team
1	Belgium	10	8	2	0	18	4	+14	26	Qualification to 2014 FIFA World Cup	—	1–1	2–1	2–0	1–1	1–0
2	Croatia	10	5	2	3	12	9	+3	17	Advance to second round	1–2	—	2–0	0–1	2–0	1–0
3	Serbia	10	4	2	4	18	11	+7	14		0–3	1–1	—	2–0	6–1	5–1
4	Scotland	10	3	2	5	8	12	−4	11		0–2	2–0	0–0	—	1–2	1–1
5	Wales	10	3	1	6	9	20	−11	10		0–2	1–2	0–3	2–1	—	1–0
6	Macedonia	10	2	1	7	7	16	−9	7		0–2	1–2	1–0	1–2	2–1	—

== Matches ==
The match schedule was determined at a meeting in Brussels, Belgium, on 23 November 2011.

7 September 2012
20:15 UTC+2

Croatia	1–0	Macedonia
Jelavić 69'	Report

Stadion Maksimir, Zagreb
Attendance: 13,883
Referee: Alon Yefet (Israel)
7 September 2012
19:45 UTC+1

Wales	0–2	Belgium
	Report	Kompany 42'; Vertonghen 83'

Cardiff City Stadium, Cardiff
Attendance: 20,156
Referee: Stefan Johannesson (Sweden)
8 September 2012
15:00 UTC+1

Scotland	0–0	Serbia
	Report

Hampden Park, Glasgow
Attendance: 47,369
Referee: Jonas Eriksson (Sweden)

11 September 2012
20:30 UTC+2

Serbia	6–1	Wales
Kolarov 16'; Tošić 24'; Đuričić 37'; Tadić 55'; Ivanović 80'; Sulejmani 90'	Report	Bale 31'

Stadion Karađorđe, Novi Sad
Attendance: 10,660
Referee: Duarte Gomes (Portugal)
11 September 2012
20:45 UTC+2

Belgium	1–1	Croatia
Gillet 45+1'	Report	Perišić 6'

King Baudouin Stadium, Brussels
Attendance: 39,987
Referee: Alberto Undiano Mallenco (Spain)
11 September 2012
20:00 UTC+1

Scotland	1–1	Macedonia
Miller 43'	Report	Noveski 11'

Hampden Park, Glasgow
Attendance: 32,430
Referee: Sergei Karasev (Russia)

12 October 2012
20:30 UTC+2

Macedonia	1–2	Croatia
Ibraimi 16'	Report	Ćorluka 33'; Rakitić 60'

Philip II Arena, Skopje
Attendance: 25,230
Referee: Peter Rasmussen (Denmark)
12 October 2012
20:30 UTC+2

Serbia	0–3	Belgium
	Report	Benteke 34'; De Bruyne 68'; Mirallas 90+1'

Stadion Crvena Zvezda, Belgrade
Attendance: 21,650
Referee: Pavel Královec (Czech Republic)
12 October 2012
19:45 UTC+1

Wales	2–1	Scotland
Bale 80' (pen.), 87'	Report	Morrison 27'

Cardiff City Stadium, Cardiff
Attendance: 23,249
Referee: Florian Meyer (Germany)

16 October 2012
20:00 UTC+2

Croatia	2–0	Wales
Mandžukić 27'; Eduardo 57'	Report

Stadion Gradski vrt, Osijek
Attendance: 17,500
Referee: Alexandru Tudor (Romania)
16 October 2012
20:30 UTC+2

Macedonia	1–0	Serbia
Ibraimi 59' (pen.)	Report

Philip II Arena, Skopje
Attendance: 26,181
Referee: Bas Nijhuis (Netherlands)
16 October 2012
20:45 UTC+2

Belgium	2–0	Scotland
Benteke 68'; Kompany 71'	Report

King Baudouin Stadium, Brussels
Attendance: 44,132
Referee: Tom Harald Hagen (Norway)

22 March 2013
18:00 UTC+1

Croatia	2–0	Serbia
Mandžukić 23'; Olić 37'	Report

Stadion Maksimir, Zagreb
Attendance: 35,722
Referee: Cüneyt Çakır (Turkey)
22 March 2013
20:45 UTC+1

Macedonia	0–2	Belgium
	Report	De Bruyne 26'; Hazard 62' (pen.)

Philip II Arena, Skopje
Attendance: 15,947
Referee: Deniz Aytekin (Germany)
22 March 2013
20:00 UTC±0

Scotland	1–2	Wales
Hanley 45+2'	Report	Ramsey 72' (pen.); Robson-Kanu 74'

Hampden Park, Glasgow
Attendance: 39,365
Referee: Antony Gautier (France)

26 March 2013
20:30 UTC+1

Serbia	2–0	Scotland
Đuričić 60', 66'	Report

Stadion Karađorđe, Novi Sad
Attendance: 6,500
Referee: István Vad (Hungary)
26 March 2013
20:45 UTC+1

Belgium	1–0	Macedonia
Hazard 62'	Report

King Baudouin Stadium, Brussels
Attendance: 44,230
Referee: Olegário Benquerença (Portugal)
26 March 2013
19:45 UTC±0

Wales	1–2	Croatia
Bale 21' (pen.)	Report	Lovren 77'; Eduardo 87'

Liberty Stadium, Swansea
Attendance: 12,534
Referee: Luca Banti (Italy)

7 June 2013
20:15 UTC+2

Croatia	0–1	Scotland
	Report	Snodgrass 26'

Stadion Maksimir, Zagreb
Attendance: 25,016
Referee: David Fernández Borbalán (Spain)
7 June 2013
20:45 UTC+2

Belgium	2–1	Serbia
De Bruyne 13'; Fellaini 60'	Report	Kolarov 87'

King Baudouin Stadium, Brussels
Attendance: 45,844
Referee: Stéphane Lannoy (France)

6 September 2013
19:00 UTC+2

Macedonia	2–1	Wales
Tričkovski 20'; Trajkovski 80'	Report	Ramsey 39' (pen.)

Philip II Arena, Skopje
Attendance: 18,000
Referee: Sascha Kever (Switzerland)
6 September 2013
20:45 UTC+2

Serbia	1–1	Croatia
Mitrović 66'	Report	Mandžukić 53'

Stadion Crvena Zvezda, Belgrade
Attendance: 30,000
Referee: Felix Brych (Germany)
6 September 2013
20:00 UTC+1

Scotland	0–2	Belgium
	Report	Defour 34'; Mirallas 89'

Hampden Park, Glasgow
Attendance: 40,284
Referee: Paolo Tagliavento (Italy)

10 September 2013
20:30 UTC+2

Macedonia	1–2	Scotland
Kostovski 85'	Report	Anya 60'; Maloney 89'

Philip II Arena, Skopje
Attendance: 14,093
Referee: Fredy Fautrel (France)
10 September 2013
19:45 UTC+1

Wales	0–3	Serbia
	Report	Đorđević 8'; Kolarov 38'; Marković 55'

Cardiff City Stadium, Cardiff
Attendance: 10,923
Referee: Szymon Marciniak (Poland)

11 October 2013
18:00 UTC+2

Croatia	1–2	Belgium
Kranjčar 84'	Report	Lukaku 16', 38'

Stadion Maksimir, Zagreb
Attendance: 13,000
Referee: Howard Webb (England)
11 October 2013
19:45 UTC+1

Wales	1–0	Macedonia
Church 67'	Report

Cardiff City Stadium, Cardiff
Attendance: 11,257
Referee: Suren Baliyan (Armenia)

15 October 2013
20:30 UTC+2

Serbia	5–1	Macedonia
Tošić 16'; Basta 19'; Kolarov 38' (pen.); Tadić 54'; Šćepović 74'	Report	Jahović 83'

Stadion Jagodina, Jagodina
Attendance: 8,294
Referee: Richard Trutz (Slovakia)
15 October 2013
21:00 UTC+2

Belgium	1–1	Wales
De Bruyne 64'	Report	Ramsey 88'

King Baudouin Stadium, Brussels
Attendance: 45,401
Referee: Sergei Karasev (Russia)
15 October 2013
20:00 UTC+1

Scotland	2–0	Croatia
Snodgrass 28'; Naismith 73'	Report

Hampden Park, Glasgow
Attendance: 30,172
Referee: Ovidiu Hațegan (Romania)

== Goalscorers ==
There were 72 goals scored in 30 matches, for an average of 2.4 goals per match.

4 goals

- (Belgium) Kevin De Bruyne
- (Serbia) Aleksandar Kolarov
- (Wales) Gareth Bale

3 goals

- (Croatia) Mario Mandžukić
- (Serbia) Filip Đuričić
- (Wales) Aaron Ramsey

2 goals

- (Belgium) Eden Hazard
- (Belgium) Vincent Kompany
- (Belgium) Romelu Lukaku
- (Belgium) Kevin Mirallas
- (Belgium) Christian Benteke
- (Croatia) Eduardo
- (North Macedonia) Agim Ibraimi
- (Scotland) Robert Snodgrass
- (Serbia) Dušan Tadić

1 goal

- (Belgium) Steven Defour
- (Belgium) Marouane Fellaini
- (Belgium) Guillaume Gillet
- (Belgium) Jan Vertonghen
- (Croatia) Vedran Ćorluka
- (Croatia) Nikica Jelavić
- (Croatia) Niko Kranjčar
- (Croatia) Dejan Lovren
- (Croatia) Ivica Olić
- (Croatia) Ivan Perišić
- (Croatia) Ivan Rakitić
- (North Macedonia) Adis Jahović
- (North Macedonia) Jovan Kostovski
- (North Macedonia) Nikolče Noveski
- (North Macedonia) Aleksandar Trajkovski
- (North Macedonia) Ivan Tričkovski
- (Scotland) Ikechi Anya
- (Scotland) Grant Hanley
- (Scotland) Shaun Maloney
- (Scotland) Kenny Miller
- (Scotland) James Morrison
- (Scotland) Steven Naismith
- (Serbia) Dušan Basta
- (Serbia) Filip Đorđević
- (Serbia) Branislav Ivanović
- (Serbia) Lazar Marković
- (Serbia) Aleksandar Mitrović
- (Serbia) Stefan Šćepović
- (Serbia) Miralem Sulejmani
- (Serbia) Zoran Tošić
- (Wales) Hal Robson-Kanu
- (Wales) Simon Church

1 own goal

- (North Macedonia) Stefan Ristovski (against Serbia)

== Discipline ==
Pos	Player	Country	Booked	Sent off (straight red)	Suspended for match(es)	Reason
DF	Milan Biševac	Serbia	4	0	vs Croatia (22 March 2013) vs Croatia (6 September 2013)	Booked in two 2014 World Cup qualifying matches Booked in two 2014 World Cup qualifying matches
MF	Guillaume Gillet	Belgium	2	0	vs Serbia (12 October 2012)	Booked in two 2014 World Cup qualifying matches
MF	Aaron Ramsey	Wales	2	0	vs Croatia (16 October 2012)	Booked in two 2014 World Cup qualifying matches
MF	Ognjen Vukojević	Croatia	3	0	vs Wales (16 October 2012)	Booked in two 2014 World Cup qualifying matches
FW	Goran Pandev	Macedonia	3	0	vs Serbia (16 October 2012)	Booked in two 2014 World Cup qualifying matches
DF	Daniel Georgievski	Macedonia	2	0	vs Belgium (22 March 2013)	Booked in two 2014 World Cup qualifying matches
DF	Aleksandar Kolarov	Serbia	2	0	vs Scotland (26 March 2013)	Booked in two 2014 World Cup qualifying matches
DF	Boban Grncarov	Macedonia	2	0	vs Belgium (26 March 2013)	Booked in two 2014 World Cup qualifying matches
MF	Muhamed Demiri	Macedonia	2	0	vs Belgium (26 March 2013)	Booked in two 2014 World Cup qualifying matches
DF	Matija Nastasić	Serbia	2	0	vs Belgium (7 June 2013)	Booked in two 2014 World Cup qualifying matches
MF	Charlie Adam	Scotland	2	0	vs Croatia (7 June 2013)	Booked in two 2014 World Cup qualifying matches
DF	Vedran Ćorluka	Croatia	3	0	vs Scotland (7 June 2013)	Booked in two 2014 World Cup qualifying matches
DF	Dejan Lovren	Croatia	2	0	vs Scotland (7 June 2013)	Booked in two 2014 World Cup qualifying matches
MF	Luka Modrić	Croatia	3	0	vs Scotland (7 June 2013)	Booked in two 2014 World Cup qualifying matches
MF	Ferhan Hasani	Macedonia	2	0	vs Wales (6 September 2013)	Booked in two 2014 World Cup qualifying matches
DF	Hal Robson-Kanu	Wales	2	0	vs Macedonia (6 September 2013)	Booked in two 2014 World Cup qualifying matches
GK	Allan McGregor	Scotland	2	0	vs Belgium (6 September 2013)	Booked in two 2014 World Cup qualifying matches
MF	Agim Ibraimi	Macedonia	2	0	vs Scotland (10 September 2013)	Booked in two 2014 World Cup qualifying matches
ST	Aleksandar Mitrovic	Serbia	2	0	vs Wales (10 September 2013)	Booked in two 2014 World Cup qualifying matches
MF	Zoran Tošić	Serbia	2	0	vs Wales (10 September 2013)	Booked in two 2014 World Cup qualifying matches
MF	Darijo Srna	Croatia	2	0	vs Belgium (11 October 2013)	Booked in two 2014 World Cup qualifying matches
DF	Steven Whittaker	Scotland	2	0	vs Croatia (15 October 2013)	Booked in two 2014 World Cup qualifying matches
MF	Andrew Crofts	Wales	2	0	vs Macedonia (11 October 2013)	Booked in two 2014 World Cup qualifying matches
MF	Ljubomir Fejsa	Serbia	2	0	vs Macedonia (15 October 2013)	Booked in two 2014 World Cup qualifying matches
MF	Marouane Fellaini	Belgium	2	0	vs Wales (15 October 2013)	Booked in two 2014 World Cup qualifying matches
DF	Vanče Šikov	Macedonia	2	0	vs Serbia (15 October 2013)	Booked in two 2014 World Cup qualifying matches
DF	James Collins	Wales	0	1	vs Serbia (11 September 2012)	Sent off in a 2014 World Cup qualifying match
DF	Nenad Tomović	Serbia	0	1	vs Croatia (22 March 2013)	Sent off in a 2014 World Cup qualifying match
MF	Robert Snodgrass	Scotland	4	1	vs Serbia (26 March 2013) vs Macedonia (10 September 2013)	Sent off in a 2014 World Cup qualifying match Booked in two 2014 World Cup qualifying matches
MF	Aaron Ramsey	Wales	0	1	vs Croatia (26 March 2013)	Sent off in a 2014 World Cup qualifying match
MF	Nemanja Matić	Serbia	2	1	vs Wales (10 September 2013)	Sent off in a 2014 World Cup qualifying match
DF	Josip Šimunić	Croatia	1	1	vs Belgium (11 October 2013) vs Scotland (15 October 2013)	Sent off in a 2014 World Cup qualifying match
