= Matej Jug =

Slovenian football referee

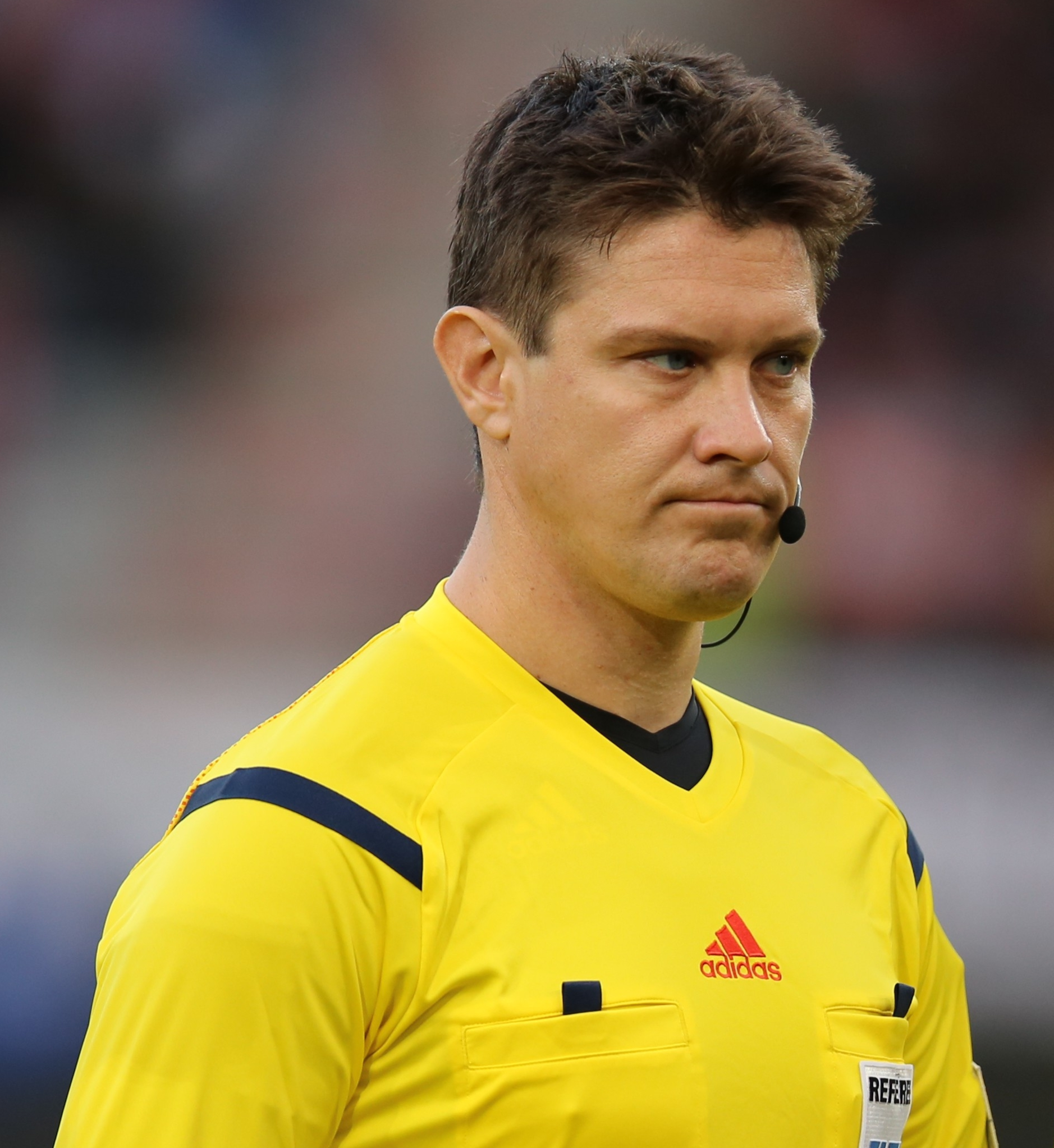
- Jug in 2014
- Full name: Matej Jug
- Born: 25 September 1980 (age 46); SR Slovenia, Yugoslavia

Domestic
Years	League	Role

International
Years	League	Role
2007–	FIFA listed	Referee

Matej Jug (born 25 September 1980) is a Slovenian international referee.

== Career ==
Matej Jug became a FIFA referee in 2007. He has refereed at the 2014 FIFA World Cup qualifiers and UEFA Euro 2012 qualification.
