= Ciprian Marica =

Romanian footballer (born 1985)

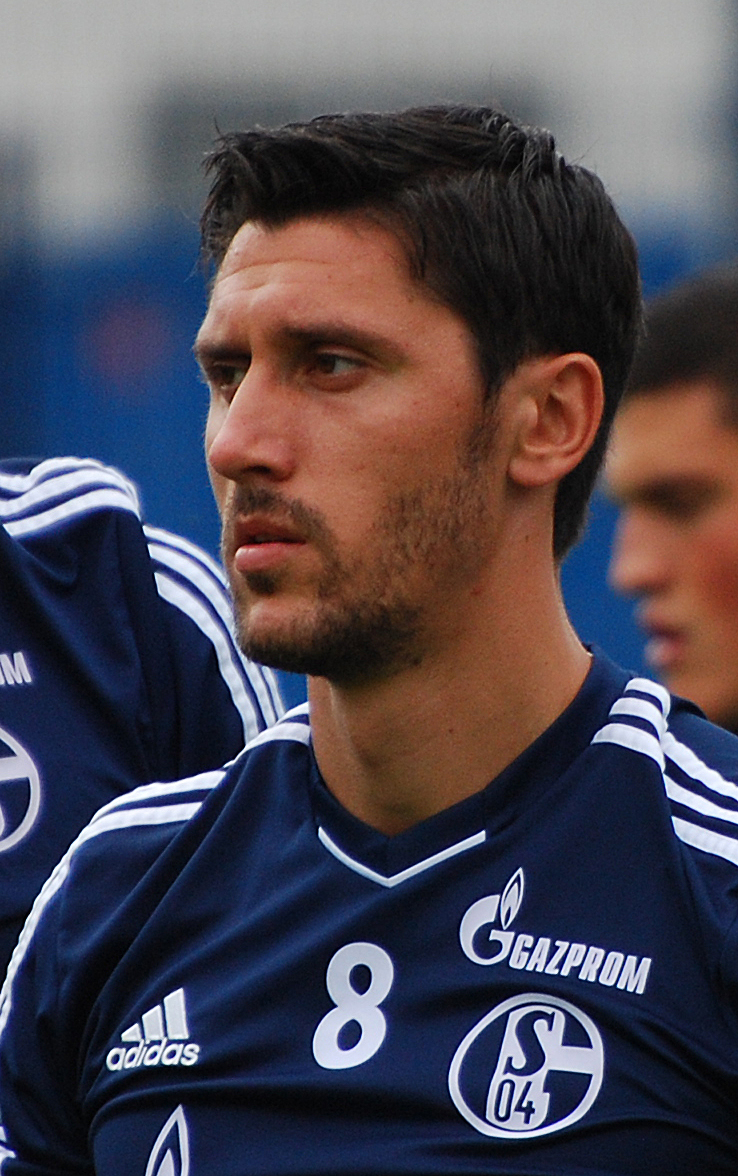
- Marica with Schalke 04 in 2011

Personal information
- Full name: Ciprian Andrei Marica
- Date of birth: 2 October 1985 (age 41)
- Place of birth: Bucharest, Romania
- Height: 1.85 m (6 ft 1 in)
- Position: Forward

Team information
- Current team: Farul Constanța (minority shareholder)

Youth career
- 1996–2002: Dinamo București

Senior career*
Years	Team	Apps	(Gls)
2001–2003	Dinamo București	22	(4)
2004–2007	Shakhtar Donetsk	75	(15)
2007–2011	VfB Stuttgart	93	(19)
2011–2013	Schalke 04	34	(5)
2013–2014	Getafe	27	(6)
2014–2015	Konyaspor	7	(1)
2016	FCSB	7	(0)
Total		266	(52)

International career
2001	Romania U17	2	(0)
2002–2003	Romania U19	3	(1)
2003–2006	Romania U21	10	(4)
2003–2014	Romania	72	(25)
- * Club domestic league appearances and goals

Ciprian Andrei Marica (Romanian pronunciation: [tʃipriˈan anˈdrej ˈmarika]; born 2 October 1985) is a Romanian former professional footballer who played as a forward.

He played for clubs in five countries, managing to win the most league and cup titles at his childhood club Dinamo București (two league and two cup titles) and Shakhtar Donetsk (three league and one cup titles). For the Romanian national team he scored 25 goals in 72 appearances, participating at the UEFA Euro 2008. He is a minority shareholder of Liga I club Farul Constanța.

== Club career ==
=== Dinamo București ===
Marica, nicknamed "The Samurai", was born on 2 October 1985 in Bucharest, Romania. He began playing junior-level football at age 11 in 1996 at local club Dinamo under coach Emil Ursu. At age 16, he made his Divizia A debut on 4 May 2002 when coaches Cornel Dinu and Marin Ion sent him in the 84th minute to replace Claudiu Drăgan in a 1–0 loss to Național București. Marica made another appearance before the end of the season as the team won the title.

In the last round of the following season, he scored his first league goal in a 3–1 away loss to Universitatea Craiova. Dinamo won the 2002–03 Cupa României, but Marica was not played by coach Ioan Andone in the 2–0 win over Oțelul Galați in the final. He helped the club eliminate Shakhtar Donetsk in the 2003–04 UEFA Cup, scoring once against them. In the first half of that season, Marica made 10 league appearances and scored three goals. Subsequently, he was transferred in the middle of the season to Shakhtar, but Dinamo still managed to win The Double without him.

=== Shakhtar Donetsk ===
Marica joined Shakhtar Donetsk for a $1.8 million fee paid to Dinamo, where he became teammates with fellow Romanians Flavius Stoican, Daniel Florea, Cosmin Bărcăuan and Răzvan Raț. He made his Vyshcha Liha debut on 14 March 2004 when coach Bernd Schuster sent him in the 65th minute to replace Brandão in a 2–0 home win over Metalurh Donetsk. He scored his first goal in the competition on 22 May in a 5–0 home victory against Karpaty Lviv. He finished his first season by winning the 2003–04 Ukrainian Cup, as new coach Mircea Lucescu sent him in the 90th minute to replace Zvonimir Vukić in the 2–0 win against Dnipro Dnipropetrovsk in the final.

Marica started the following season by playing in the Champions League qualifying rounds, scoring two goals against Pyunik and one against Club Brugge, as his side eliminated those teams and reached the group stage. There, he made five appearances without scoring. He finished the season by winning the league championship, contributing with two goals netted in 16 matches.

Marica began the 2005–06 season by winning the Ukrainian Super Cup, as Lucescu sent him in the 69th minute to replace Andriy Vorobey in the eventual penalty shoot-out victory against rivals Dynamo Kyiv. Afterwards, he helped the team get past the 2005–06 UEFA Cup group stage, scoring a goal in a 2–0 victory against VfB Stuttgart. The campaign ended in the round of 32 where they lost 3–2 on aggregate to Lille with Marica netting one of his side's goals. In the league, he scored four goals in 21 matches as Shakhtar finished equal on 75 points with Dinamo Kiev. Eventually they faced each other in a play-off match in which Marica opened the scoring in the 2–1 win that helped them secure the title.

Marica started the 2006–07 season strongly by netting three goals in the first three rounds, which were victories against Kryvbas Kryvyi Rih, Zorya Luhansk and Metalist Kharkiv. He also scored a brace in the second leg of the Champions League third qualifying round in the 4–2 aggregate victory over Legia Warsaw. Marica continued his scoring in the competition's group stage, finding the net once in a 2–2 draw against Olympiacos and netting the only goal of a 1–0 win over AS Roma with a header. Subsequently, The Miners continued their European campaign in the UEFA Cup, reaching the round of 16 where they were defeated by title holders and eventual winners, Sevilla. In the first round of the 2007–08 season, Marica made his last Vyshcha Liha appearance in a 1–1 derby draw against Dynamo Kiev. Afterwards, he joined VfB Stuttgart, but Shakhtar succeeded in winning The Double at the end of the season without him.

=== VfB Stuttgart ===
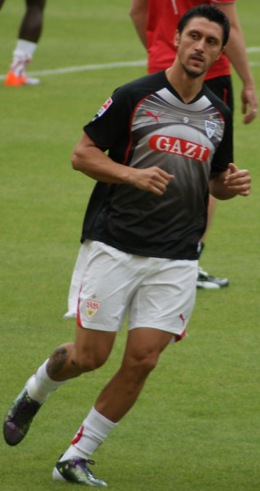
Marica warming up for VfB Stuttgart in 2010.

On 23 July 2007, Marica was transferred from Shakhtar to Bundesliga champions VfB Stuttgart for an €8 million fee. Marica signed a five-year contract and Stuttgart's sporting director Horst Heldt said: "Ciprian is a very flexible forward, and a permanent thorn in the side of any opposition defense, who fits outstandingly into our team. He wanted to join us desperately."

He made his Bundesliga debut under coach Armin Veh on 12 August 2007, playing as a starter in a 2–2 home draw against Schalke 04. Until the end of the season, he scored two league goals in victories over Eintracht Frankfurt and VfL Wolfsburg. He also netted the winning goal in a 3–2 victory against Rangers in the Champions League group stage. It was a spectacular goal, as Marica was in the penalty area with an opponent behind him and with his back to the goal when he received a pass from Ludovic Magnin and flicked the ball with his calf to score. The Bild tabloid praised his performance: "Marica scored a sugar goal". During the second half of the season, he had compatriot Sergiu Radu as one of his teammates.

Marica started the following season by scoring in the first round in a 3–1 away victory against Borussia Mönchengladbach. Until season's end, he found the net three more times in victories over Karlsruher SC, Mönchengladbach once again and Schalke 04. He also scored a brace as his side defeated Saturn Moscow Oblast in the last round of the 2008 Intertoto Cup. Subsequently, The Reds continued their European campaign in the UEFA Cup —with Marica scoring two goals in the group stage in a draw against Sampdoria and a win over Standard Liège— the club reaching the round of 32 where they were defeated by Zenit Saint Petersburg.

In the 2009–10 season, Marica scored a career-best 10 league goals. Among these were the winning goal with a header from Cacau's pass in a 2–1 away victory against Bayern Munich and two doubles in a 2–0 win over Hannover 96 and a 2–2 draw against Mainz 05. In the first leg of the Champions League play-off, he earned a penalty for his side which was scored by Timo Gebhart in the eventual 2–0 aggregate success over Politehnica Timișoara. Thus they reached the group stage where he scored once in a 3–1 victory against Unirea Urziceni. Stuttgart advanced to the round of 16 where Marica played in both legs of the 5–1 aggregate loss to Barcelona.

In his last season at VfB, he scored three league goals in wins over Borussia Mönchengladbach and Werder Bremen, but also in a loss to Hamburg. Marica also netted three goals in the Europa League group stage: one in each of the two victories against Getafe and one in a 5–1 success over Odense to help his side reach the round of 32. However, in February 2011, following an interview for the Gazeta Sporturilor newspaper in which he criticized coach Bruno Labbadia, Marica was excluded from Stuttgart's squad. On 12 July 2011, Marica was released from his contract at Stuttgart.

=== Schalke 04 ===
On 28 July 2011, Marica signed a two-year contract with German club Schalke 04, worth €5 million. He chose to remain in Germany, despite having offers from Premier League club Blackburn Rovers, and two French clubs, Marseille and Paris Saint-Germain.

He made his Bundesliga debut for Schalke on 13 August 2011 when coach Ralf Rangnick sent him in the 82nd minute to replace Raúl in a 5–1 home win over 1. FC Köln. Marica scored his first two goals in the 4–1 victory against the same opponent in the second half of the season. He also netted a goal in a 3–0 success over Maccabi Haifa in the 2011–12 Europa League group stage. The team reached the quarter-finals of the competition where they were defeated 6–4 on aggregate by Athletic Bilbao.

Marica scored his first goal in the 2012–13 season on 8 December 2012 in a 3–1 away loss to his former team, VfB Stuttgart. Until the end of the season, he would score two more goals in victories against Hannover 96 and Werder Bremen. He also made three appearances in the Champions League group stage. Marica played his last Bundesliga match on 20 April 2013 in a 1–0 away loss to Eintracht Frankfurt, totaling 124 matches with 24 goals in the competition.

=== Getafe ===
On 27 September 2013, Marica signed a contract with Spanish La Liga side Getafe. He made his league debut on 6 October, as coach Luis García sent him in the 69th minute to replace Adrián Colunga in a 3–1 win against Betis Sevilla. On 31 October, Marica scored his first goal in a 2–0 away victory over Villarreal. In May 2014, during the last round of the season, he scored twice in a 2–1 win against Rayo Vallecano, thus helping Getafe avoid relegation.

=== Konyaspor ===
In the summer of 2014, Marica signed a two-year contract with Turkish side Konyaspor where he was teammates with compatriot Gabriel Torje. He made his Süper Lig debut on 30 August under coach Mesut Bakkal in a 2–1 away loss to Eskişehirspor. On 28 September, he scored his only league goal in a 1–0 win over Kayseri Erciyesspor. Marica was released by Konyaspor on 15 October 2015, having played only seven games in 14 months for the Turkish side, mainly because of his injuries.

=== Steaua București ===
On 14 January 2016, Marica reached an agreement with Steaua București, thus returning to Romania after twelve years. He became the 59th footballer to play for both big Bucharest rivals, Dinamo and Steaua București. In his first match with Steaua, a 2–0 victory against Concordia Chiajna, he was played by coach Laurențiu Reghecampf from the start and was replaced after 84 minutes by Tha'er Bawab. His performance was deemed weak and conservative, as he only managed to get two opportunities in a game in which he was otherwise unremarkable. He made only seven goalless appearances for Steaua in the league, with the last one taking place on 10 May 2016 in a 4–1 victory against ASA Târgu Mureș. Marica also played in a 2–0 win over Astra Giurgiu in the 2015–16 Cupa Ligii semi-finals, a competition which Steaua won, but he did not play in the 2–1 victory against Chiajna in the final. Throughout his career, Marica was ranked fourth for the Romanian Footballer of the Year award twice, in 2006 and 2013.

== International career ==
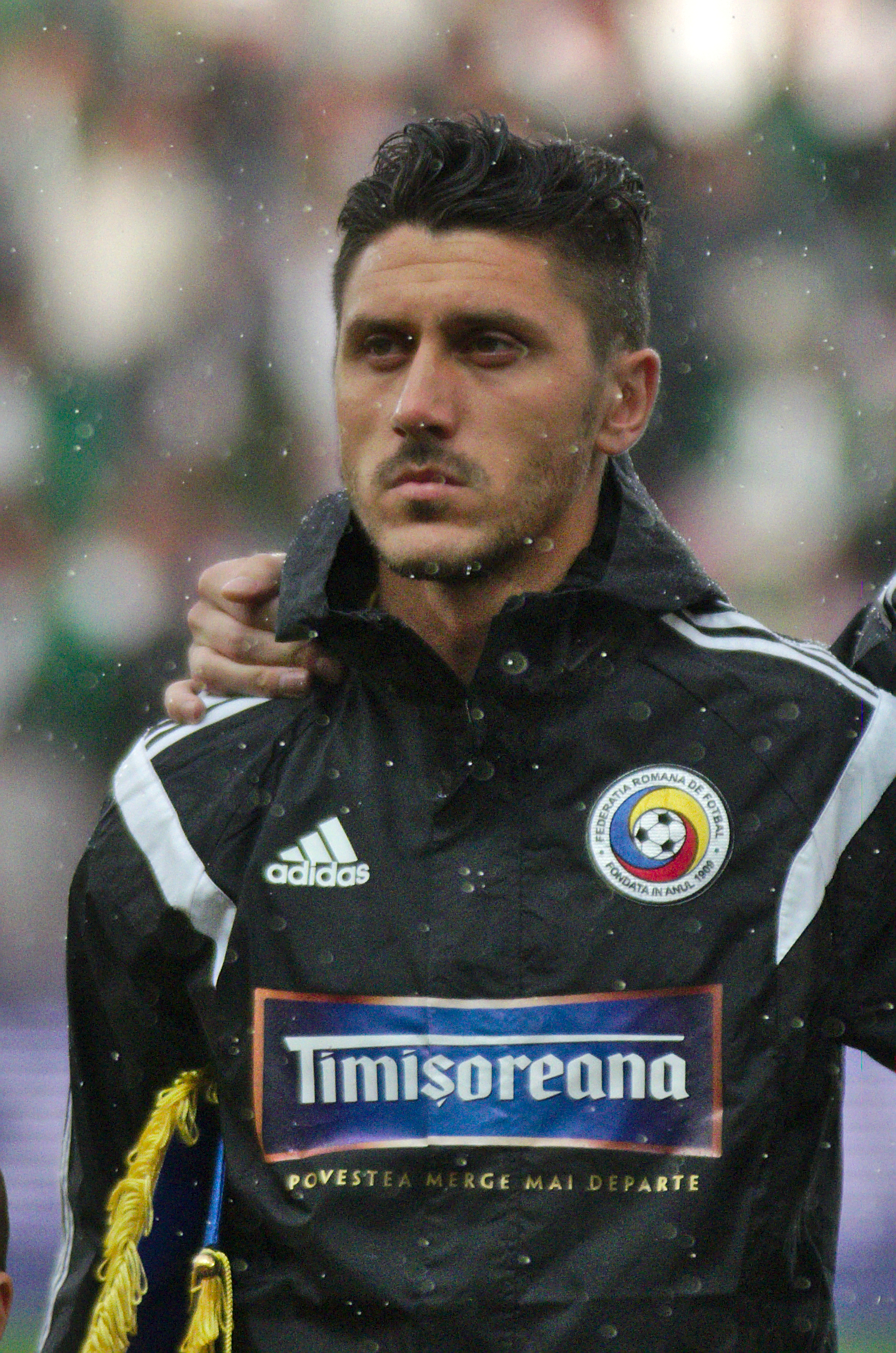
Marica lining up for Romania in 2014

Marica scored 25 goals in 72 caps for Romania, making his debut on 16 November 2003, as coach Anghel Iordănescu sent him in the 81st minute to replace Daniel Pancu in a 1–0 friendly loss to Italy. He played four matches during the 2006 World Cup qualifiers, scoring his first goal for the national team in a 1–1 draw against Armenia.

Marica played 11 matches and scored five goals in the successful Euro 2008 qualifiers. On 25 March 2008, he was decorated by the president of Romania, Traian Băsescu with the Ordinul "Meritul Sportiv" – (The Medal of "Sportive Merit") Class III for his performance in those qualifiers. Marica was called by Victor Pițurcă in the squad for the Euro 2008 final tournament, but did not get an opportunity to play.

He played nine matches in the 2010 World Cup qualifiers, scoring two goals: one in a 3–2 loss to Serbia and one in a 1–0 win over Lithuania. Subsequently, he played 10 matches during the Euro 2012 qualifiers and netted three goals against Bosnia and Herzegovina, including one in a 2–1 loss and two in a 3–0 win.

Marica made 10 appearances and scored five goals during the 2014 World Cup qualifiers, including opening the scoring in a 3–0 home win over rivals Hungary. He scored his only hat-trick for Romania on 4 June 2013 in a 4–0 friendly victory against Trinidad and Tobago. Marica's last match for the national team took place on 7 September 2014 during the Euro 2016 qualifiers in a 1–0 away win over Greece in which he served as captain, scored the goal from a penalty kick, but also received a red card in the 53rd minute of the game.

== After retirement ==
In September 2018, Marica became the owner of Farul Constanța. At a press conference from 21 June 2021, Marica, together with Viitorul Constanța's owner Gheorghe Hagi and president Gheorghe Popescu announced that Viitorul and Farul had merged into one team which would have the name of the latter and Marica would be a minority shareholder.

== Career statistics ==
=== Club ===
Appearances and goals by club, season and competition
Club	Season	League			National cup (Note: Includes Cupa României, Ukrainian Cup, DFB-Pokal, Copa del Rey, Turkish Cup)		Europe		Other		Total	
Club	Season	Division	Apps	Goals	Apps	Goals	Apps	Goals	Apps	Goals	Apps	Goals
Dinamo București	2001–02	Divizia A	2	0	0	0	–		–		2	0
Dinamo București	2002–03	Divizia A	11	1	3	0	0	0	0	0	14	1
Dinamo București	2003–04	Divizia A	10	3	1	2	5 (Note: Appearances in UEFA Cup)	1	0	0	16	6
Dinamo București	Total		23	4	4	2	5	1	0	0	32	7
Shakhtar Donetsk	2003–04	Vyscha Liha	13	4	2	0	–		–		15	4
Shakhtar Donetsk	2004–05	Vyscha Liha	16	2	6	0	9 (Note: Appearances in UEFA Champions League)	3	1 (Note: Appearance in Ukrainian Super Cup)	0	32	5
Shakhtar Donetsk	2005–06	Vyscha Liha	22	5	1	0	9 (Note: Two appearances in UEFA Champions League, seven appearances and two goals in UEFA Cup)	2	1	0	33	7
Shakhtar Donetsk	2006–07	Vyscha Liha	23	6	2	0	11 (Note: Eight appearances and four goals in UEFA Champions League, three appearances in UEFA Cup)	4	1	0	37	10
Shakhtar Donetsk	2007–08	Vyscha Liha	1	0	–		–		0	0	1	0
Shakhtar Donetsk	Total		75	17	11	0	29	9	3	0	118	26
VfB Stuttgart	2007–08	Bundesliga	28	2	3	0	4	1	–		35	3
VfB Stuttgart	2008–09	Bundesliga	27	4	3	1	11 (Note: Two appearances and two goals in UEFA Intertoto Cup, nine appearances and three goals in UEFA Cup)	5	–		41	10
VfB Stuttgart	2009–10	Bundesliga	25	10	2	0	6	1	–		33	11
VfB Stuttgart	2010–11	Bundesliga	13	3	2	0	9 (Note: Appearances in UEFA Europa League)	3	–		24	6
VfB Stuttgart	Total		93	19	10	1	30	10	–		132	30
Schalke 04	2011–12	Bundesliga	21	2	1	0	11	1	–		33	3
Schalke 04	2012–13	Bundesliga	13	3	3	3	3	0	–		19	6
Schalke 04	Total		34	5	4	3	14	1	–		52	9
Getafe	2013–14	La Liga	27	6	2	1	–		–		29	7
Konyaspor	2014–15	Süper Lig	6	1	2	1	–		–		8	2
Konyaspor	2015–16	Süper Lig	1	0	–		–		–		1	0
Konyaspor	Total		7	1	2	1	–		–		9	2
Steaua București	2015–16	Liga I	7	0	1	0	–		1 (Note: Appearances in Cupa Ligii)	0	9	0
Career total			266	52	34	8	78	21	4	0	382	81

=== International ===
Appearances and goals by national team and year
National team	Year	Apps	Goals
Romania	2003	1	0
Romania	2004	4	1
Romania	2005	0	0
Romania	2006	5	3
Romania	2007	11	3
Romania	2008	7	2
Romania	2009	10	3
Romania	2010	6	1
Romania	2011	9	3
Romania	2012	7	2
Romania	2013	8	6
Romania	2014	4	1
Total		72	25

Scores and results list Romania's goal tally first, score column indicates score after each Marica goal.

List of international goals scored by Ciprian Marica
No.	Date	Venue	Opponent	Score	Result	Competition
1	17 November 2004	Hanrapetakan Stadium, Yerevan, Armenia	Armenia	1–0	1–1	2006 FIFA World Cup Qualification
2	2 September 2006	Stadionul Farul, Constanța, Romania	Bulgaria	2–0	2–2	UEFA Euro 2008 qualifying
3	7 October 2006	Stadionul Steaua, Bucharest, Romania	Belarus	2–0	3–1	UEFA Euro 2008 qualifying
4	15 November 2006	Estadio Ramón de Carranza, Cádiz, Spain	Spain	1–0	1–0	Friendly
5	28 March 2007	Ceahlăul Stadium, Piatra Neamț, Romania	Luxembourg	3–0	3–0	UEFA Euro 2008 qualifying
6	17 October 2007	Stade Josy Barthel, Luxembourg, Luxembourg	Luxembourg	2–0	2–0	UEFA Euro 2008 qualifying
7	21 November 2007	Național Stadium, Bucharest, Romania	Albania	5–1	6–1	UEFA Euro 2008 qualifying
8	26 March 2008	Stadionul Steaua, Bucharest, Romania	Russia	1–0	3–0	Friendly
9	19 November 2008	Stadionul Dinamo, Bucharest, Romania	Georgia	1–1	2–1	Friendly
10	11 February 2009	Stadionul Steaua, Bucharest, Romania	Croatia	1–0	1–2	Friendly
11	28 March 2009	Stadionul Farul, Constanța, Romania	Serbia	1–2	2–3	2010 FIFA World Cup qualification
12	6 June 2009	Sūduva Stadium, Marijampolė, Lithuania	Lithuania	1–0	1–0	2010 FIFA World Cup qualification
13	17 November 2010	Hypo-Arena, Klagenfurt, Austria	Italy	1–0	1–1	Friendly
14	26 March 2011	Bilino Polje, Zenica, Bosnia and Herzegovina	Bosnia and Herzegovina	1–0	1–2	UEFA Euro 2012 qualifying
15	3 June 2011	Giulești-Valentin Stănescu, Bucharest, Romania	Bosnia and Herzegovina	2–0	3–0	UEFA Euro 2012 qualifying
16	3 June 2011	Giulești-Valentin Stănescu, Bucharest, Romania	Bosnia and Herzegovina	3–0	3–0	UEFA Euro 2012 qualifying
17	7 September 2012	A. Le Coq Arena, Tallinn, Estonia	Estonia	2–0	2–0	2014 FIFA World Cup qualification
18	16 October 2012	Arena Națională, Bucharest, Romania	Netherlands	1–2	1–4	2014 FIFA World Cup qualification
19	4 June 2013	Arena Națională, Bucharest, Romania	Trinidad and Tobago	1–0	4–0	Friendly
20	4 June 2013	Arena Națională, Bucharest, Romania	Trinidad and Tobago	2–0	4–0	Friendly
21	4 June 2013	Arena Națională, Bucharest, Romania	Trinidad and Tobago	4–0	4–0	Friendly
22	6 September 2013	Arena Națională, Bucharest, Romania	Hungary	1–0	3–0	2014 FIFA World Cup qualification
23	15 October 2013	Arena Națională, Bucharest, Romania	Estonia	1–0	2–0	2014 FIFA World Cup qualification
24	15 October 2013	Arena Națională, Bucharest, Romania	Estonia	2–0	2–0	2014 FIFA World Cup qualification
25	7 September 2014	Karaiskakis Stadium, Piraeus, Greece	Greece	1–0	1–0	UEFA Euro 2016 qualification

== Honours ==
Dinamo București

- Divizia A: 2001–02, 2003–04
- Cupa României: 2002–03, 2003–04

Shakhtar Donetsk

- Vyshcha Liha: 2004–05, 2005–06, 2007–08
- Ukrainian Cup: 2003–04
- Ukrainian Supercup: 2005

VfB Stuttgart

- Intertoto Cup: 2008

Steaua București

- Cupa Ligii: 2015–16

Individual

- Romanian Footballer of the Year fourth place: 2006, 2013
