= Netherlands national football team results (2020–present) =

- Win Draw Loss

This article provides details of international football games played by the Netherlands national football team from 2020 to present.

== Matches ==
=== Results ===
==== 2020 ====
28 May Friendly	Netherlands	Cancelled	Greece	Enschede, Netherlands
19:30 UTC+2				Stadium: De Grolsch Veste

6 June Friendly	Netherlands	Cancelled	Wales	Rotterdam, Netherlands
19:30 UTC+2				Stadium: De Kuip

4 September 2020–21 Nations League GS	Netherlands	1–0	Poland	Amsterdam, Netherlands
20:45 UTC+2	Bergwijn 61'	Report		Stadium: Johan Cruyff Arena; Attendance: 0 (Note: Due to the COVID-19 pandemic in Europe, all matches scheduled for September 2020 were played behind closed doors.); Referee: Georgi Kabakov (Bulgaria)

7 September 2020–21 Nations League GS	Netherlands	0–1	Italy	Amsterdam, Netherlands
20:45 UTC+2		Report	Barella 45+1'	Stadium: Johan Cruyff Arena; Attendance: 0 Referee: Felix Brych (Germany)

7 October Friendly	Netherlands	0–1	Mexico	Amsterdam, Netherlands
20:45 UTC+2		Report	Jiménez 60' (pen.)	Stadium: Johan Cruyff Arena; Attendance: 0 Referee: Srđan Jovanović (Serbia)

11 October 2020–21 Nations League GS	Bosnia and Herzegovina	0–0	Netherlands	Zenica, Bosnia and Herzegovina
18:00 UTC+2		Report		Stadium: Bilino Polje; Attendance: 1,600; Referee: István Kovács (Romania)

14 October 2020–21 Nations League GS	Italy	1–1	Netherlands	Bergamo, Italy
20:45 UTC+2	Pellegrini 16'	Report	Van de Beek 25'	Stadium: Stadio Atleti Azzurri d'Italia; Attendance: 0 (Note: Due to the COVID-19 pandemic in Italy, Italy played their home match behind closed doors.); Referee: Anthony Taylor (England)

11 November Friendly	Netherlands	1–1	Spain	Amsterdam, Netherlands
20:45	Van de Beek 47'	Report	Canales 19'	Stadium: Johan Cruyff Arena; Attendance: 0 Referee: Davide Massa (Italy)

15 November 2020–21 Nations League GS	Netherlands	3–1	Bosnia and Herzegovina	Amsterdam, Netherlands
18:00 UTC+1	Wijnaldum 6', 14'; Depay 55'	Report	Prevljak 63'	Stadium: Johan Cruyff Arena; Attendance: 0 Referee: François Letexier (France)

18 November 2020–21 Nations League GS	Poland	1–2	Netherlands	Chorzów, Poland
20:45 UTC+1	Jóźwiak 6'	Report	Depay 77' (pen.); Wijnaldum 84'	Stadium: Silesian Stadium; Attendance: 0 Referee: Orel Grinfeld (Israel)

==== 2021 ====
24 March 2022 World Cup qualification	Turkey	4–2	Netherlands	Istanbul, Turkey
18:00	Yılmaz 15', 34' (pen.), 81'; Çalhanoğlu 46'	Report	Klaassen 75'; L. de Jong 77'	Stadium: Atatürk Olympic Stadium; Attendance: 0 Referee: Michael Oliver (England)

27 March 2022 World Cup qualification	Netherlands	2–0	Latvia	Amsterdam, Netherlands
18:00	Berghuis 32'; L. de Jong 69'	Report		Stadium: Johan Cruyff Arena; Attendance: 5,000; Referee: Stéphanie Frappart (France)

30 March 2022 World Cup qualification	Gibraltar	0–7	Netherlands	Gibraltar
20:45		Report	Berghuis 42'; L. de Jong 55'; Depay 61', 88'; Wijnaldum 62'; Malen 64'; Van de Beek 85'	Stadium: Victoria Stadium; Attendance: 335; Referee: João Pinheiro (Portugal)

2 June Friendly	Netherlands	2–2	Scotland	Algarve, Portugal
19:45 UTC+1	Hendry 10'; Nisbet 64'	Report	Depay 17', 89'	Stadium: Estádio Algarve; Attendance: 0 Referee: Vitor Ferreira (Portugal)

6 June Friendly	Netherlands	3–0	Georgia	Enschede, Netherlands
18:00 UTC+2	Depay 10' (pen.); Weghorst 55'; Gravenberch 76'	Report		Stadium: De Grolsch Veste; Attendance: 7,500; Referee: Erik Lambrechts (Belgium)

13 June Euro 2020 GS	Netherlands	3–2	Ukraine	Amsterdam, Netherlands
21:00 UTC+2	Wijnaldum 52'; Weghorst 58'; Dumfries 85'	Report	Yarmolenko 75'; Yaremchuk 79'	Stadium: Johan Cruyff Arena; Attendance: 15,837; Referee: Felix Brych (Germany)

17 June Euro 2020 GS	Netherlands	2–0	Austria	Amsterdam, Netherlands
21:00 UTC+2	Depay 11' (pen.); Dumfries 67'	Report		Stadium: Johan Cruyff Arena; Attendance: 15,243; Referee: Orel Grinfeld (Israel)

21 June Euro 2020 GS	North Macedonia	0–3	Netherlands	Amsterdam, Netherlands
18:00 UTC+2		Report	Depay 24'; Wijnaldum 51', 58'	Stadium: Johan Cruyff Arena; Attendance: 15,227; Referee: István Kovács (Romania)

27 June Euro 2020 R16	Netherlands	0–2	Czech Republic	Budapest, Hungary
18:00 UTC+2		Report	Holeš 68'; Schick 80'	Stadium: Puskás Aréna; Attendance: 52,834; Referee: Sergei Karasev (Russia)

1 September 2022 World Cup qualification	Norway	1–1	Netherlands	Oslo, Norway
20:45 UTC+2	Haaland 20'	Report	Klaassen 37'	Stadium: Ullevaal Stadion; Attendance: 6,711; Referee: Szymon Marciniak (Poland)

4 September 2022 World Cup qualification	Netherlands	4–0	Montenegro	Eindhoven, Netherlands
20:45	Depay 38' (pen.), 62'; Wijnaldum 70'; Gakpo 76'	Report		Stadium: Philips Stadion; Attendance: 20,458; Referee: Jesús Gil Manzano (Spain)

7 September 2022 World Cup qualification	Netherlands	6–1	Turkey	Amsterdam, Netherlands
20:45	Klaassen 1'; Depay 16', 38' (pen.), 54'; Til 80'; Malen 90'	Report	Ünder 90+2'	Stadium: Johan Cruyff Arena; Attendance: 31,389; Referee: Daniele Orsato (Italy)

8 October 2022 World Cup qualification	Latvia	0–1	Netherlands	Riga, Latvia
20:45		Report	Klaassen 19'	Stadium: Daugava Stadium; Attendance: 4,711; Referee: Andrew Madley (England)

11 October 2022 World Cup qualification	Netherlands	6–0	Gibraltar	Rotterdam, Netherlands
20:45	Van Dijk 9'; Depay 21', 45+3' (pen.); Dumfries 48'; Danjuma 75'; Malen 86'	Report		Stadium: De Kuip; Attendance: 31,583; Referee: Vitali Meshkov (Russia)

13 November 2022 World Cup qualification	Montenegro	2–2	Netherlands	Podgorica, Montenegro
20:45	Vukotić 82'; Vujnović 86'	Report	Depay 25' (pen.), 54'	Stadium: City Stadium; Attendance: 1,844; Referee: Carlos del Cerro Grande (Spain)

16 November 2022 World Cup qualification	Netherlands	2–0	Norway	Rotterdam, Netherlands
20:45	Bergwijn 84'; Depay 90+1'	Report		Stadium: De Kuip; Attendance: 0 Referee: Clément Turpin (France)

==== 2022 ====
26 March Friendly	Netherlands	4–2	Denmark	Amsterdam, Netherlands
20:45	Bergwijn 16', 71'; Aké 29'; Depay 38' (pen.)	Report	Vestergaard 20'; Eriksen 48'	Stadium: Johan Cruyff Arena; Attendance: 39,440; Referee: Lawrence Visser (Belgium)

29 March Friendly	Netherlands	1–1	Germany	Amsterdam, Netherlands
20:45	Bergwijn 68'	Report	Müller 45+1'	Stadium: Johan Cruyff Arena; Attendance: 50,387; Referee: Craig Pawson (England)

3 June 2022–23 Nations League GS	Belgium	1–4	Netherlands	Brussels, Belgium
20:45	Batshuayi 90+3'	Report	Bergwijn 40'; Depay 51', 65'; Dumfries 65'	Stadium: King Baudouin Stadium; Attendance: 38,327; Referee: José María Sánchez (Spain)

8 June 2022–23 Nations League GS	Wales	1–2	Netherlands	Cardiff, Wales
20:45	Norrington-Davies 90+2'	Report	Koopmeiners 50'; Weghorst 90+4'	Stadium: Cardiff City Stadium; Attendance: 23,395; Referee: Glenn Nyberg (Sweden)

11 June 2022–23 Nations League GS	Netherlands	2–2	Poland	Rotterdam, Netherlands
20:45	Klaassen 51'; Dumfries 54'	Report	Cash 18'; Zieliński 49'	Stadium: De Kuip; Attendance: 39,382; Referee: Halil Umut Meler (Turkey)

14 June 2022–23 Nations League GS	Netherlands	3–2	Wales	Rotterdam, Netherlands
20:45	Lang 17'; Gakpo 23'; Depay 90+3'	Report	Johnson 26'; Bale 90+2' (pen.)	Stadium: De Kuip; Attendance: 37,247; Referee: Horațiu Feșnic (Romania)

22 September 2022–23 Nations League GS	Poland	0–2	Netherlands	Warsaw, Poland
20:45		Report	Gakpo 13'; Bergwijn 60'	Stadium: Stadion Narodowy; Attendance: 56,673; Referee: Alejandro Hernández Hernández (Spain)

25 September 2022–23 Nations League GS	Netherlands	1–0	Belgium	Amsterdam, Netherlands
20:45	Van Dijk 73'	Report		Stadium: Johan Cruyff Arena; Attendance: 52,314; Referee: Anthony Taylor (England)

21 November 2022 World Cup GS	Senegal	0–2	Netherlands	Doha, Qatar
19:00 AST (UTC+3)		Report	Gakpo 84'; Klaassen 90+9'	Stadium: Al Thumama Stadium; Attendance: 41,721; Referee: Wilton Sampaio (Brazil)

25 November 2022 World Cup GS	Netherlands	1–1	Ecuador	Al Rayyan, Qatar
19:00 AST (UTC+3)	Gakpo 8'	Report	Valencia 49'	Stadium: Khalifa International Stadium; Attendance: 44,833; Referee: Mustapha Ghorbal (Algeria)

29 November 2022 World Cup GS	Netherlands	2–0	Qatar	Al Khor, Qatar
18:00 AST (UTC+3)	Gakpo 26'; F. de Jong 49'	Report		Stadium: Al Bayt Stadium; Attendance: 66,784; Referee: Bakary Gassama (Gambia)

3 December 2022 World Cup R16	Netherlands	3–1	United States	Al Rayyan, Qatar
18:00 AST (UTC+3)	Depay 10'; Blind 45+1'; Dumfries 81'	Report	Wright 76'	Stadium: Khalifa International Stadium; Attendance: 44,846; Referee: Wilton Sampaio (Brazil)

9 December 2022 World Cup QF	Netherlands	2–2 (a.e.t.) (3–4 p)	Argentina	Lusail, Qatar
22:00 AST (UTC+3)	Weghorst 83', 90+11'	Report	Molina 35'; Messi 73' (pen.)	Stadium: Lusail Iconic Stadium; Attendance: 88,235; Referee: Antonio Mateu Lahoz (Spain)
	Penalties
	Van Dijk (penalty missed); Berghuis (penalty missed); Koopmeiners (penalty scored); Weghorst (penalty scored); L. de Jong (penalty scored)		(penalty scored) Messi; (penalty scored) Paredes; (penalty scored) Montiel; (penalty missed) Fernández; (penalty scored) La. Martínez

==== 2023 ====
24 March Euro 2024 qualifying	France	4–0	Netherlands	Saint-Denis, France
20:45 CET (UTC+1)	Griezmann 2'; Upamecano 8'; Mbappé 21', 88'	Report		Stadium: Stade de France; Attendance: 77,328; Referee: Maurizio Mariani (Italy)

27 March Euro 2024 qualifying	Netherlands	3–0	Gibraltar	Rotterdam, Netherlands
20:45 CET (UTC+1)	Depay 23'; Aké 50', 82'	Report		Stadium: De Kuip; Attendance: 36,327; Referee: Morten Krogh (Denmark)

14 June 2023 Nations League SF	Netherlands	2–4 (a.e.t.)	Croatia	Rotterdam, Netherlands
20:45 CEST (UTC+2)	Malen 34'; Lang 90+6'	Report	Kramarić 55' (pen.); Pašalić 72'; Petković 98'; Modrić 116' (pen.)	Stadium: De Kuip; Attendance: 39,359; Referee: István Kovács (Romania)

18 June 2023 Nations League 3rd	Netherlands	2–3	Italy	Enschede, Netherlands
15:00 CEST (UTC+2)	Bergwijn 68'; Wijnaldum 90'	Report	Dimarco 6'; Frattesi 20'; Chiesa 72'	Stadium: De Grolsch Veste; Attendance: 21,292; Referee: Glenn Nyberg (Sweden)

7 September Euro 2024 qualifying	Netherlands	3–0	Greece	Eindhoven, Netherlands
20:45 CEST (UTC+2)	De Roon 17'; Gakpo 31'; Weghorst 39'	Report		Stadium: Philips Stadion; Attendance: 32,079; Referee: Michael Oliver (England)

10 September Euro 2024 qualifying	Republic of Ireland	1–2	Netherlands	Dublin, Ireland
20:45 CEST (UTC+2)	Idah 4' (pen.)	Report	Gakpo 19' (pen.); Weghorst 56'	Stadium: Aviva Stadium; Attendance: 49,807; Referee: Irfan Peljto (Bosnia and Herzegovina)

13 October Euro 2024 qualifying	Netherlands	1–2	France	Amsterdam, Netherlands
20:45 CEST (UTC+2)	Hartman 83'	Report	Mbappe 7', 53'	Stadium: Johan Cruyff Arena; Attendance: 51,310; Referee: Felix Zwayer (Germany)

16 October Euro 2024 qualifying	Greece	0–1	Netherlands	Athens, Greece
21:45 EEST (UTC+3)		Report	Van Dijk 90+3' (pen.)	Stadium: Agia Sophia Stadium; Attendance: 24,967; Referee: Alejandro Hernández Hernández (Spain)

18 November Euro 2024 qualifying	Netherlands	1–0	Republic of Ireland	Amsterdam, Netherlands
20:45 CET (UTC+1)	Weghorst 11'	Report		Stadium: Johan Cruyff Arena; Attendance: 51,811; Referee: Marco Di Bello (Italy)

21 November Euro 2024 qualifying	Gibraltar	0–6	Netherlands	Faro/Loulé, Portugal (Note: Match was played at Estádio Algarve, Faro/Loulé, Portugal, due to the redevelopment of Victoria Stadium, Gibraltar.)
20:45 CET (UTC+1)		Report	Stengs 10', 50', 62'; Wieffer 23'; Koopmeiners 38'; Gakpo 81'	Stadium: Estádio Algarve; Attendance: 2,280; Referee: Arda Kardeşler (Turkey)

==== 2024 ====
22 March Friendly	Netherlands	4–0	Scotland	Amsterdam, Netherlands
20:45 (UTC+1)	Reijnders 40'; Wijnaldum 72'; Weghorst 84'; Malen 86'	Report		Stadium: Johan Cruyff Arena; Attendance: 46,223; Referee: Erik Lambrechts (Belgium)

26 March Friendly	Germany	2–1	Netherlands	Frankfurt, Germany
20:45 (UTC+1)	Mittelstädt 11'; Füllkrug 85'	Report	Veerman 4'	Stadium: Waldstadion; Attendance: 48,390; Referee: Espen Eskås (Norway)

6 June Friendly	Netherlands	4–0	Canada	Rotterdam, Netherlands
20:45 CEST (UTC+2)	Depay 50'; Frimpong 57'; Weghorst 63'; Van Dijk 83'	Report		Stadium: De Kuip; Attendance: 36,060; Referee: Rohit Saggi (Norway)

10 June Friendly	Netherlands	4–0	Iceland	Rotterdam, Netherlands
20:45 CEST (UTC+2)	Simons 23'; Van Dijk 49'; Malen 79'; Weghorst 90+3'	Report		Stadium: De Kuip; Attendance: 42,000; Referee: Evangelos Manouchos (Greece)

16 June Euro 2024 GS	Poland	1–2	Netherlands	Hamburg, Germany
15:00 CEST (UTC+2)	Buksa 16'	Report	Gakpo 29'; Weghorst 83'	Stadium: Volksparkstadion; Attendance: 48,117; Referee: Artur Soares Dias (Portugal)

21 June Euro 2024 GS	Netherlands	0–0	France	Leipzig, Germany
CEST (UTC+2)		Report		Stadium: Red Bull Arena; Attendance: 38,531; Referee: Anthony Taylor (England)

25 June Euro 2024 GS	Netherlands	2–3	Austria	Berlin, Germany
18:00 CEST (UTC+2)	Gakpo 47'; Depay 75'	Report	Malen 6' (o.g.); Schmid 59'; Sabitzer 80'	Stadium: Olympiastadion; Attendance: 68,363; Referee: Ivan Kružliak (Slovakia)

2 July Euro 2024 R16	Romania	0–3	Netherlands	Munich, Germany
18:00 CEST (UTC+2)		Report	Gakpo 20'; Malen 83', 90+3'	Stadium: Allianz Arena; Attendance: 65,012; Referee: Felix Zwayer (Germany)

6 July Euro 2024 QF	Netherlands	2–1	Turkey	Berlin, Germany
21:00 CEST (UTC+2)	De Vrij 70'; Müldür 76' (o.g.)	Report	Akaydin 35'	Stadium: Olympiastadion; Attendance: 70,091; Referee: Clément Turpin (France)

10 July Euro 2024 SF	Netherlands	1–2	England	Dortmund, Germany
21:00 CEST (UTC+2)	Simons 7'	Report	Kane 18' (pen.); Watkins 90'	Stadium: Westfalenstadion; Attendance: 60,926; Referee: Felix Zwayer (Germany)

7 September 2024–25 Nations League GS	Netherlands	5–2	Bosnia and Herzegovina	Eindhoven, Netherlands
20:45 CEST (UTC+2)	Zirkzee 13'; Reijnders 45+2'; Gakpo 56'; Weghorst 88'; Simons 90+2'	Report	Demirović 27'; Džeko 73'	Stadium: Philips Stadion; Attendance: 31,139; Referee: Donatas Rumšas (Lithuania)

10 September 2024–25 Nations League GS	Netherlands	2–2	Germany	Amsterdam, Netherlands
20:45 CEST (UTC+2)	Reijnders 2'; Dumfries 50'	Report	Undav 38'; Kimmich 45+3'	Stadium: Johan Cruyff Arena; Attendance: 50,109; Referee: Davide Massa (Italy)

11 October 2024–25 Nations League GS	Hungary	1–1	Netherlands	Budapest, Hungary
20:45 CEST (UTC+2)	Sallai 32'	Report	Dumfries 83'	Stadium: Puskás Aréna; Attendance: 55,300; Referee: Lukas Fähndrich (Switzerland)

14 October 2024–25 Nations League GS	Germany	1–0	Netherlands	Munich, Germany
20:45 CEST (UTC+2)	Leweling 64'	Report		Stadium: Allianz Arena; Attendance: 68,367; Referee: Slavko Vinčić (Slovenia)

16 November 2024–25 Nations League GS	Netherlands	4–0	Hungary	Amsterdam, Netherlands
20:45 CET (UTC+1)	Weghorst 21' (pen.); Gakpo 45+12' (pen.); Dumfries 64'; Koopmeiners 85'	Report		Stadium: Johan Cruyff Arena; Attendance: 51,611; Referee: Jesús Gil Manzano (Spain)

19 November 2024–25 Nations League GS	Bosnia and Herzegovina	1–1	Netherlands	Zenica, Bosnia and Herzegovina
20:45 CET (UTC+1)	Demirović 67'	Report	Brobbey 24'	Stadium: Bilino Polje Stadium; Attendance: 4,134; Referee: Aliyar Aghayev (Azerbaijan)

==== 2025 ====
20 March 2024–25 Nations League QF	Netherlands	2–2	Spain	Rotterdam, Netherlands
20:45 CET (UTC+1)	Gakpo 28'; Reijnders 46'	Report	Williams 9'; Merino 90+3'	Stadium: De Kuip; Attendance: 42,003; Referee: Glenn Nyberg (Sweden)

23 March 2024–25 Nations League QF	Spain	3–3 (a.e.t.) (5–5 agg.) (5–4 p)	Netherlands	Valencia, Spain
20:45 CET (UTC+1)	Oyarzabal 8' (pen.), 67'; Yamal 103'	Report	Depay 54' (pen.); Maatsen 79'; Simons 109' (pen.)	Stadium: Mestalla; Attendance: 48,082; Referee: Clément Turpin (France)
	Penalties
	Merino (penalty scored); Torres (penalty scored); García (penalty scored); Yamal (penalty missed); Baena (penalty scored); Pedri (penalty scored)		(penalty scored) Van Dijk; (penalty scored) Koopmeiners; (penalty scored) Simons; (penalty missed) Lang; (penalty scored) Taylor; (penalty missed) Malen

7 June 2026 World Cup qualification	Finland	0–2	Netherlands	Helsinki, Finland
20:45 CEST (UTC+2)		Report	Depay 6'; Dumfries 23'	Stadium: Helsinki Olympic Stadium; Attendance: 29,483; Referee: Daniel Siebert (Germany)

10 June 2026 World Cup qualification	Netherlands	8–0	Malta	Groningen, Netherlands
20:45 CEST (UTC+2)	Depay 9' (pen.), 16'; Van Dijk 20'; Simons 61'; Malen 74', 80'; Lang 78'; Van de Ven 90+2'	Report		Stadium: Euroborg; Attendance: 21,006; Referee: Ricardo de Burgos Bengoetxea (Spain)

4 September 2026 World Cup qualification	Netherlands	1–1	Poland	Rotterdam, Netherlands
20:45 CEST (UTC+2)	Dumfries 28'	Report	Cash 80'	Stadium: De Kuip; Attendance: 40,904; Referee: Simone Sozza (Italy)

7 September 2026 World Cup qualification	Lithuania	2–3	Netherlands	Kaunas, Lithuania
18:00 CEST (UTC+2)	Gineitis 36'; Girdvainis 43'	Report	Depay 11', 63'; Q. Timber 33'	Stadium: Darius and Girėnas Stadium; Attendance: 14,797; Referee: Elchin Masiyev (Azerbaijan)

9 October 2026 World Cup qualification	Malta	0–4	Netherlands	Ta' Qali, Malta
20:45 CEST (UTC+2)		Report	Gakpo 12' (pen.), 49' (pen.); Reijnders 57'; Depay 90+3'	Stadium: National Stadium; Attendance: 9,254; Referee: Duje Strukan (Croatia)

12 October 2026 World Cup qualification	Netherlands	4–0	Finland	Amsterdam, Netherlands
18:00 CEST (UTC+2)	Malen 8'; Van Dijk 17'; Depay 38' (pen.); Gakpo 84'	Report		Stadium: Johan Cruyff Arena; Attendance: 52,387; Referee: Slavko Vinčić (Slovenia)

14 November 2026 World Cup qualification	Poland	1–1	Netherlands	Warsaw, Poland
20:45 CET (UTC+1)	Kamiński 43'	Report	Depay 47'	Stadium: Stadion Narodowy; Attendance: 56,278; Referee: Maurizio Mariani (Italy)

17 November 2026 World Cup qualification	Netherlands	4–0	Lithuania	Amsterdam, Netherlands
20:45 CET (UTC+1)	Reijnders 16'; Gakpo 58' (pen.); Simons 60'; Malen 62'	Report		Stadium: Johan Cruyff Arena; Attendance: 46,913; Referee: Luis Godinho (Portugal)

==== 2026 ====
27 March Friendly	Netherlands	2–1	Norway	Amsterdam, Netherlands
20:45 CET (UTC+1)	Van Dijk 35'; Reijnders 51'	Report	Schjelderup 24'	Stadium: Johan Cruyff Arena; Attendance: 50,327; Referee: Lawrence Visser (Belgium)

31 March Friendly	Netherlands	1–1	Ecuador	Eindhoven, Netherlands
20:45 CEST (UTC+2)	Pacho 3' (o.g.)	Report	Valencia 24' (pen.)	Stadium: Philips Stadion; Attendance: 29,344; Referee: Sascha Stegemann (Germany)

3 June Friendly	Netherlands	0–1	Algeria	Rotterdam, Netherlands
20:45 CEST (UTC+2)		Report	Hadj Moussa 86'	Stadium: De Kuip; Attendance: 40,306; Referee: Jakob Semler (Austria)

8 June Friendly	Netherlands	2–1	Uzbekistan	New York City, United States
14:45 EDT (UTC-4)	Gakpo 32' (pen.), 90+8' (pen.)	Report	Sergeev 90+2'	Stadium: Icahn Stadium; Attendance: 0 (BCD); Referee: Alyssa Pennington (United States)

14 June 2026 World Cup GS	Netherlands	2–2	Japan	Arlington, United States
15:00 EST (UTC-5)	Van Dijk 51'; Summerville 64'	Report	Nakamura 57'; Kamada 88'	Stadium: AT&T Stadium; Attendance: 69,285; Referee: Ismail Elfath (United States)

20 June 2026 World Cup GS	Netherlands	5–1	Sweden	Houston, United States
12:00 EST (UTC-5)	Brobbey 5', 17'; Gakpo 47', 54'; Summerville 89'	Report	Elanga 59'	Stadium: NRG Stadium; Attendance: 68,777; Referee: Michael Oliver (England)

25 June 2026 World Cup GS	Tunisia	1–3	Netherlands	Kansas City, United States
18:00 EST (UTC-5)	Mastouri 54'	Report	Skhiri 3' (o.g.); Brobbey 7'; Van Hecke 62'	Stadium: Arrowhead Stadium; Attendance: 68,391; Referee: Katia Itzel García (Mexico)

29 June 2026 World Cup R32	Netherlands	1–1 (a.e.t.) (2–3 p)	Morocco	Guadalupe, Mexico
19:00 CST UTC−6	Gakpo 72'	Report	Diop 90+1'	Stadium: Estadio BBVA; Attendance: 51,243; Referee: Wilton Sampaio (Brazil)
	Penalties
	Koopmeiners (penalty scored); Kluivert (penalty missed); Weghorst (penalty scored); Timber (penalty missed); Summerville (penalty missed)		(penalty missed) El Aynaoui; (penalty scored) Rahimi; (penalty scored) Talbi; (penalty missed) Hakimi; (penalty scored) Saibari

24 September 2026–27 Nations League GS	Netherlands	1–1	Germany	Amsterdam, Netherlands
20:45 CEST (UTC+2)	Gakpo 90+2'	Report	Nmecha 32'	Stadium: Johan Cruyff Arena; Attendance: 51,437; Referee: Alejandro Hernández Hernández (Spain)

27 September 2026–27 Nations League GS	Serbia	1–2	Netherlands	Belgrade, Serbia
18:00 CEST (UTC+2)	Jović 46'	Report	Meerdink 30' (pen.), 69'	Stadium: Rajko Mitić Stadium; Attendance: 15,212; Referee: Szymon Marciniak (Poland)

1 October 2026–27 Nations League GS	Greece	2–2	Netherlands	Thessaloniki, Greece
21:45 EEST (UTC+3)	Ioannidis 23'; Masouras 45+2'	Report	Van Dijk 59'; Reijnders 89'	Stadium: Toumba Stadium; Attendance: 26,538; Referee: Marco Guida (Italy)

4 October 2026–27 Nations League GS	Netherlands	2–1	Serbia	Eindhoven, Netherlands
20:45 CEST (UTC+2)	Koopmeiners 31'; Zirkzee 71'	Report	Cvetković 35'	Stadium: Philips Stadion; Attendance: 31,387; Referee: Donatas Rumšas (Lithuania)

13 November 2026–27 Nations League GS	Netherlands	7–0	Greece	Amsterdam, Netherlands
20:45 CET (UTC+1)	Summerville 6'; Reijnders 12', 18', 33'; J. Timber 40', 59'; Malen 61'	Report		Stadium: Johan Cruyff Arena; Attendance: 51,221; Referee: Rohit Saggi (Norway)

16 November 2026–27 Nations League GS	Germany	5–0	Netherlands	Berlin, Germany
20:45 CET (UTC+1)	Scherhant 41'; Wirtz 60', 71'; Schlotterbeck 65'; Gruda 77'	Report		Stadium: Olympiastadion; Attendance: 74,667; Referee: Glenn Nyberg (Sweden)

=== Fixtures ===
==== 2027 ====
27 March 2026–27 Nations League QF	Netherlands	v	Portugal	Netherlands
20:45 CET (UTC+1)		Report

30 March 2026–27 Nations League QF	Portugal	v	Netherlands	Portugal
20:45 CEST (UTC+2)		Report
