= UEFA Euro 2024 statistics =

European football tournament statistics

The following article outlines statistics for UEFA Euro 2024, which took place across Europe from 14 June to 14 July 2024. Goals scored during penalty shoot-outs are not counted, and matches decided by a penalty shoot-out are considered draws.

== Goalscorers ==
There were 117 goals scored in 51 matches, for an average of 2.29 goals per match.

3 goals

- (England) Harry Kane
- (Georgia (country)) Georges Mikautadze
- (Germany) Jamal Musiala
- (Netherlands) Cody Gakpo
- (Slovakia) Ivan Schranz
- (Spain) Dani Olmo

2 goals

- (England) Jude Bellingham
- (Germany) Niclas Füllkrug
- (Germany) Kai Havertz
- (Germany) Florian Wirtz
- (Netherlands) Donyell Malen
- (Romania) Răzvan Marin
- (Spain) Fabián Ruiz
- (Spain) Nico Williams
- (Switzerland) Breel Embolo
- (Turkey) Merih Demiral

1 goal

- (Albania) Nedim Bajrami
- (Albania) Klaus Gjasula
- (Albania) Qazim Laçi
- (Austria) Marko Arnautović
- (Austria) Christoph Baumgartner
- (Austria) Michael Gregoritsch
- (Austria) Marcel Sabitzer
- (Austria) Romano Schmid
- (Austria) Gernot Trauner
- (Belgium) Kevin De Bruyne
- (Belgium) Youri Tielemans
- (Croatia) Andrej Kramarić
- (Croatia) Luka Modrić
- (Czech Republic) Lukáš Provod
- (Czech Republic) Patrik Schick
- (Czech Republic) Tomáš Souček
- (Denmark) Christian Eriksen
- (Denmark) Morten Hjulmand
- (England) Cole Palmer
- (England) Bukayo Saka
- (England) Ollie Watkins
- (France) Randal Kolo Muani
- (France) Kylian Mbappé
- (Georgia (country)) Khvicha Kvaratskhelia
- (Germany) Emre Can
- (Germany) İlkay Gündoğan
- (Hungary) Kevin Csoboth
- (Hungary) Barnabás Varga
- (Italy) Nicolò Barella
- (Italy) Alessandro Bastoni
- (Italy) Mattia Zaccagni
- (Netherlands) Memphis Depay
- (Netherlands) Xavi Simons
- (Netherlands) Stefan de Vrij
- (Netherlands) Wout Weghorst
- (Poland) Adam Buksa
- (Poland) Robert Lewandowski
- (Poland) Krzysztof Piątek
- (Portugal) Francisco Conceição
- (Portugal) Bruno Fernandes
- (Portugal) Bernardo Silva
- (Romania) Denis Drăguș
- (Romania) Nicolae Stanciu
- (Scotland) Scott McTominay
- (Serbia) Luka Jović
- (Slovakia) Ondrej Duda
- (Slovenia) Erik Janža
- (Slovenia) Žan Karničnik
- (Spain) Dani Carvajal
- (Spain) Mikel Merino
- (Spain) Álvaro Morata
- (Spain) Mikel Oyarzabal
- (Spain) Rodri
- (Spain) Ferran Torres
- (Spain) Lamine Yamal
- (Switzerland) Michel Aebischer
- (Switzerland) Kwadwo Duah
- (Switzerland) Remo Freuler
- (Switzerland) Dan Ndoye
- (Switzerland) Xherdan Shaqiri
- (Switzerland) Rubén Vargas
- (Turkey) Samet Akaydin
- (Turkey) Kerem Aktürkoğlu
- (Turkey) Hakan Çalhanoğlu
- (Turkey) Arda Güler
- (Turkey) Mert Müldür
- (Turkey) Cenk Tosun
- (Ukraine) Mykola Shaparenko
- (Ukraine) Roman Yaremchuk

1 own goal

- (Albania) Klaus Gjasula (against Croatia)
- (Austria) Maximilian Wöber (against France)
- (Belgium) Jan Vertonghen (against France)
- (Czech Republic) Robin Hranáč (against Portugal)
- (Germany) Antonio Rüdiger (against Scotland)
- (Italy) Riccardo Calafiori (against Spain)
- (Netherlands) Donyell Malen (against Austria)
- (Spain) Robin Le Normand (against Georgia)
- (Turkey) Samet Akaydin (against Portugal)
- (Turkey) Mert Müldür (against Netherlands)

Source: UEFA

== Assists ==
4 assists

- (Spain) Lamine Yamal

2 assists

- (Austria) Alexander Prass
- (Croatia) Ante Budimir
- (France) Kylian Mbappé
- (Germany) Joshua Kimmich
- (Netherlands) Nathan Aké
- (Netherlands) Xavi Simons
- (Romania) Dennis Man
- (Spain) Dani Olmo
- (Spain) Fabián Ruiz
- (Slovakia) Juraj Kucka
- (Switzerland) Michel Aebischer
- (Switzerland) Remo Freuler
- (Turkey) Arda Güler

1 assist

- (Albania) Jasir Asani
- (Austria) Christoph Baumgartner
- (Austria) Florian Grillitsch
- (Austria) Philipp Mwene
- (Austria) Stefan Posch
- (Belgium) Koen Casteels
- (Belgium) Romelu Lukaku
- (Czech Republic) Vladimír Coufal
- (Czech Republic) Ondřej Lingr
- (Denmark) Victor Kristiansen
- (Denmark) Jonas Wind
- (England) Jude Bellingham
- (England) Marc Guéhi
- (England) Cole Palmer
- (England) Declan Rice
- (England) Bukayo Saka
- (England) Ivan Toney
- (France) Randal Kolo Muani
- (Georgia (country)) Otar Kakabadze
- (Georgia (country)) Giorgi Kochorashvili
- (Georgia (country)) Georges Mikautadze
- (Germany) İlkay Gündoğan
- (Germany) Kai Havertz
- (Germany) Maximilian Mittelstädt
- (Germany) Thomas Müller
- (Germany) David Raum
- (Germany) Nico Schlotterbeck
- (Hungary) Roland Sallai
- (Hungary) Dominik Szoboszlai
- (Italy) Riccardo Calafiori
- (Italy) Lorenzo Pellegrini
- (Netherlands) Memphis Depay
- (Netherlands) Denzel Dumfries
- (Netherlands) Cody Gakpo
- (Netherlands) Wout Weghorst
- (Poland) Piotr Zieliński
- (Portugal) Nuno Mendes
- (Portugal) Cristiano Ronaldo
- (Scotland) Callum McGregor
- (Scotland) Scott McKenna
- (Serbia) Ivan Ilić
- (Slovakia) Lukáš Haraslín
- (Slovakia) David Strelec
- (Slovenia) Timi Max Elšnik
- (Spain) Marc Cucurella
- (Spain) Mikel Oyarzabal
- (Spain) Pedri
- (Spain) Nico Williams
- (Switzerland) Dan Ndoye
- (Switzerland) Rubén Vargas
- (Turkey) Kaan Ayhan
- (Turkey) Orkun Kökçü
- (Turkey) İsmail Yüksek
- (Ukraine) Mykola Shaparenko
- (Ukraine) Oleksandr Zinchenko

Source: UEFA

== Clean sheets ==
4 clean sheets

- (France) Mike Maignan

3 clean sheets

- (Portugal) Diogo Costa

2 clean sheets

- (Belgium) Koen Casteels
- (England) Jordan Pickford
- (Germany) Manuel Neuer
- (Netherlands) Bart Verbruggen
- (Slovenia) Jan Oblak
- (Spain) Unai Simón

1 clean sheet

- (Denmark) Kasper Schmeichel
- (Georgia (country)) Giorgi Mamardashvili
- (Hungary) Péter Gulácsi
- (Romania) Florin Niță
- (Serbia) Predrag Rajković
- (Slovakia) Martin Dúbravka
- (Spain) David Raya
- (Switzerland) Yann Sommer
- (Ukraine) Anatoliy Trubin

Source: UEFA

== Awards ==
=== Golden Boot ===
Unlike in previous editions, the "Alipay Top Scorer" award, given to the top scorer of the tournament, was allowed to be shared among multiple players, whereas previous installments used assists and minutes played as tiebreakers. The award was thus given to each of the six players who scored three goals in the tournament: Cody Gakpo, Harry Kane, Georges Mikautadze, Jamal Musiala, Dani Olmo, and Ivan Schranz.

- (Netherlands) Cody Gakpo
- (England) Harry Kane
- (Georgia (country)) Georges Mikautadze
- (Germany) Jamal Musiala
- (Spain) Dani Olmo
- (Slovakia) Ivan Schranz

(3 goals each)

=== Man of the Match ===
Rank	Player	Team	Opponent(s)	Awards
1	Jude Bellingham	England	vs Serbia (GS), vs Slovakia (R16)	2
1	Kevin De Bruyne	Belgium	vs Romania (GS), vs Ukraine (GS)	2
1	Christian Eriksen	Denmark	vs Slovenia (GS), vs Serbia (GS)	2
1	Cody Gakpo	Netherlands	vs Poland (GS), vs Romania (R16)	2
1	N'Golo Kanté	France	vs Austria (GS), vs Netherlands (GS)	2
1	Stanislav Lobotka	Slovakia	vs Slovakia (GS), vs Belgium (GS)	2
1	Nico Williams	Spain	vs Italy (GS), vs England (Final)	2
1	Granit Xhaka	Switzerland	vs Hungary (GS), vs Germany (GS)	2
9	Manuel Akanji	Switzerland	vs Scotland (GS)	1
9	Christoph Baumgartner	Austria	vs Poland (GS)	1
9	Adam Gnezda Čerin	Slovenia	vs England (GS)	1
9	Federico Chiesa	Italy	vs Albania (GS)	1
9	Diogo Costa	Portugal	vs Slovenia (R16)	1
9	Ousmane Dembélé	France	vs Portugal (QF)	1
9	Merih Demiral	Turkey	vs Austria (R16)	1
9	Stefan de Vrij	Netherlands	vs Turkey (QF)	1
9	Arda Güler	Turkey	vs Georgia (GS)	1
9	İlkay Gündoğan	Germany	vs Hungary (GS)	1
9	Pierre-Emile Højbjerg	Denmark	vs England (GS)	1
9	Žan Karničnik	Slovenia	vs Serbia (GS)	1
9	Jules Koundé	France	vs Belgium (R16)	1
9	Andrej Kramarić	Croatia	vs Albania (GS)	1
9	Khvicha Kvaratskhelia	Georgia	vs Portugal (GS)	1
9	Giorgi Mamardashvili	Georgia	vs Czech Republic (GS)	1
9	Luka Modrić	Croatia	vs Italy (GS)	1
9	Jamal Musiala	Germany	vs Scotland (GS)	1
9	Dani Olmo	Spain	vs Germany (QF)	1
9	Rodri	Spain	vs Georgia (R16)	1
9	Fabián Ruiz	Spain	vs Croatia (GS)	1
9	Antonio Rüdiger	Germany	vs Denmark (R16)	1
9	Marcel Sabitzer	Austria	vs Netherlands (GS)	1
9	Bukayo Saka	England	vs Switzerland (QF)	1
9	Roland Sallai	Hungary	vs Scootland (GS)	1
9	Mykola Shaparenko	Ukraine	vs Slovakia (GS)	1
9	Bernardo Silva	Portugal	vs Turkey (GS)	1
9	Łukasz Skorupski	Poland	vs France (GS)	1
9	Nicolae Stanciu	Romania	vs Ukraine (GS)	1
9	Ferran Torres	Spain	vs Albania (GS)	1
9	Rubén Vargas	Switzerland	vs Italy (R16)	1
9	Vitinha	Portugal	vs Czech Republic (GS)	1
9	Ollie Watkins	England	vs Netherlands (SF)	1
9	Lamine Yamal	Spain	vs France (SF)	1
9	Barış Alper Yılmaz	Turkey	vs Czech Republic (GS)	1

Source: UEFA

== Scoring ==
Overview

- Total number of goals scored: 117
- Average goals per match: 2.29
- Total number of braces: 1
  Donyell Malen
- Total number of penalty kicks awarded: 11
- Total number of penalty kicks scored: 8
  Kai Havertz for Germany against Scotland and against Denmark (2)
  Georges Mikautadze for Georgia against Czech Republic and against Portugal (2)
  Marko Arnautović for Austria against Poland
  Robert Lewandowski for Poland against France
  Răzvan Marin for Romania against Slovakia
  Kylian Mbappé for France against Poland
- Total number of penalty kicks missed or saved: 3
  Luka Modrić for Croatia against Italy
  Bruno Petković for Croatia against Spain
  Cristiano Ronaldo for Portugal against Slovenia
- Penalty kick success rate: 72.73%
- Own goals scored: 10
  Samet Akaydin, Riccardo Calafiori, Klaus Gjasula, Robin Hranáč, Mert Müldür, Robin Le Normand, Donyell Malen, Antonio Rüdiger, Jan Vertonghen, Maximilian Wöber

Timing

- First goal of the tournament: Florian Wirtz for Germany against Scotland
- First brace of the tournament: Donyell Malen for Netherlands against Romania
- Last goal of the tournament: Mikel Oyarzabal for Spain against England
- Last brace of the tournament: Donyell Malen for Netherlands against Romania
- Fastest goal in a match from kickoff: 1st minute (0:23)
  Nedim Bajrami for Albania against Italy
- Latest goal in a match without extra time: 90+10th minute
  Kevin Csoboth for Hungary against Scotland
- Latest goal in a match with extra time: 119th minute
  Mikel Merino for Spain against Germany
- Latest winning goal in a match without extra time: 119th minute
  Mikel Merino for Spain against Germany
- Latest winning goal in a match with extra time: 119th minute
  Mikel Merino for Spain against Germany

Teams

- Most goals scored by a team: 15
  Spain
- Fewest goals scored by a team: 1
  Serbia
- Most goals conceded by a team: 9
  Georgia
- Fewest goals conceded by a team: 2
  Belgium, Serbia, Slovenia
- Best goal difference: +11
  Spain
- Worst goal difference: –5
  Scotland
- Most goals scored in a match by both teams: 6
  Germany (5–1) Scotland
- Most goals scored in a match by one team: 5
  Germany against Scotland
- Most goals scored in a match by the losing team: 5
  Scotland against Germany
- Biggest margin of victory: 4 goals
  Germany (5–1) Scotland
- Most clean sheets achieved by a team: 4
  France
- Fewest clean sheets achieved by a team: 0
  Albania, Austria, Croatia, Czech Republic, Italy, Poland, Scotland, Turkey
- Most clean sheets given by an opposing team: 3
  Portugal
- Fewest clean sheets given by an opposing team: 0
  Germany, Spain, Italy, Poland
- Most consecutive clean sheets achieved by a team: 3
  Spain

Individual

- Most goals scored by an individual: 3
  Cody Gakpo, Harry Kane, Georges Mikautadze, Jamal Musiala, Dani Olmo, Ivan Schranz
- Most assists provided by an individual: 4
  Lamine Yamal
- Most goals and assists produced by an individual: 5
  Dani Olmo (3 goals, 2 assists)
- Most clean sheets achieved by a goalkeeper: 4
  Mike Maignan
- Fewest clean sheets achieved by a goalkeeper: 0
  Altay Bayındır, Gianluigi Donnarumma, Angus Gunn, Matěj Kovář, Dominik Livaković, Andriy Lunin, Patrick Pentz, Łukasz Skorupski, Jindřich Staněk, Thomas Strakosha, Wojciech Szczęsny
- Most consecutive clean sheets achieved by a goalkeeper: 2
  Mike Maignan, Unai Simón
- Most goals scored by one player in a match: 2
- Oldest goal scorer: 38 years and 289 days
  Luka Modrić for Croatia against Italy
- Youngest goal scorer: 16 years and 362 days
  Lamine Yamal for Spain against France

== Attendance ==
- Overall attendance: 2,681,288
- Average attendance per match: 52,574
- Highest attendance: 70,091 – Netherlands vs Turkey
- Lowest attendance: 38,305 – Austria vs Turkey

== Wins and losses ==
- Most wins: 7 – Spain
- Fewest wins: 0 – Albania, Croatia, Czech Republic, Denmark, Poland, Scotland, Serbia, Slovenia
- Most losses: 2 – Austria, Belgium, Croatia, Czech Republic, Georgia, Hungary, Italy, Netherlands, Poland, Romania, Scotland, Slovakia, Turkey
- Fewest losses: 0 – Slovenia, Spain, Switzerland
- Most draws: 4 – Slovenia
- Fewest draws: 0 – Austria, Hungary, Spain, Turkey
- Most points in the group stage: 9 – Spain
- Fewest points in the group stage: 1 – Albania, Czech Republic, Poland, Scotland

== Overall statistics ==
Team	Pld	W	D	L	Pts	APts	GF	AGF	GA	AGA	GD	AGD	CS	ACS	YC	AYC	RC	ARC
Albania	3	0	1	**2**	1	0.33	3	1.00	5	1.67	−2	−0.67	0	0.00	7	2.33	0	0.00
Austria	4	2	0	**2**	6	1.50	7	1.75	6	1.50	+1	0.25	0	0.00	12	3.00	0	0.00
Belgium	4	1	1	**2**	4	1.00	2	0.50	2	0.50	0	0.00	2	0.50	8	2.00	0	0.00
Croatia	3	0	2	1	2	0.67	3	1.00	6	2.00	−3	−1.00	0	0.00	7	2.33	0	0.00
Czech Republic	3	0	1	**2**	1	0.33	3	1.00	5	1.67	−2	−0.67	0	0.00	12	**4.00**	**2**	**0.67**
Denmark	4	0	3	1	3	0.75	2	0.50	4	1.00	−2	−0.50	1	0.25	9	2.25	0	0.00
England	**7**	3	3	1	12	1.71	8	1.14	6	0.86	+2	0.29	2	0.29	14	2.00	0	0.00
France	6	2	3	1	9	1.50	4	0.67	3	0.50	+1	0.17	**4**	**0.67**	9	1.50	0	0.00
Georgia	4	1	1	**2**	4	1.00	5	1.25	**9**	2.25	−4	−1.00	1	0.25	7	1.75	0	0.00
Germany	5	3	1	1	10	2.00	11	**2.20**	4	0.80	+7	1.40	2	0.40	14	2.80	0	0.00
Hungary	3	1	0	**2**	3	1.00	2	0.67	5	1.67	−3	−1.00	1	0.33	10	3.33	0	0.00
Italy	4	1	1	**2**	4	1.00	3	0.75	5	1.25	−2	−0.50	0	0.00	10	2.50	0	0.00
Netherlands	6	3	1	**2**	10	1.67	10	1.67	7	1.17	+3	0.50	2	0.33	11	1.83	0	0.00
Poland	3	0	1	**2**	1	0.33	3	1.00	6	2.00	−3	−1.00	0	0.00	8	2.67	0	0.00
Portugal	5	2	2	1	8	1.60	5	1.00	3	0.60	+2	0.40	3	0.60	10	2.00	0	0.00
Romania	4	1	1	**2**	4	1.00	4	1.00	6	1.50	−2	−0.50	1	0.25	9	2.25	0	0.00
Scotland	3	0	1	**2**	1	0.33	2	0.67	7	**2.33**	−5	−1.67	0	0.00	5	1.67	1	0.33
Serbia	3	0	2	1	2	0.67	1	0.33	2	0.67	−1	−0.33	1	0.33	9	3.00	0	0.00
Slovakia	4	1	1	**2**	4	1.00	**4**	1.00	5	1.25	−1	−0.25	1	0.25	8	2.00	0	0.00
Slovenia	4	0	**4**	0	4	1.00	2	0.50	2	0.50	0	0.00	2	0.50	12	3.00	1	0.25
**Spain**	**7**	**7**	0	0	**21**	**3.00**	**15**	2.14	4	0.57	**+11**	**1.57**	3	0.43	16	2.29	1	0.14
Switzerland	5	2	3	0	9	1.80	8	1.60	4	0.80	+4	0.80	1	0.20	10	2.00	0	0.00
Turkey	5	3	0	**2**	9	1.80	8	1.60	8	1.60	0	0.00	0	0.00	**20**	**4.00**	1	0.20
Ukraine	3	1	1	1	4	1.33	2	0.67	4	1.33	−2	−0.67	1	0.33	3	1.00	0	0.00
Total	51^{(1)}	34	17^{(2)}	34	136	1.33	142	1.39	117	1.15	+25	0.25	28	0.27	240	2.35	6	0.06

Team(s) rendered in italics represent(s) the host nation(s). The competition's winning team is rendered in bold.
^{(1)} – Total games lost not counted in total games played (total games lost = total games won)
^{(2)} – Total number of games drawn (tied) for all teams = Total number of games drawn (tied) ÷ 2 (both teams involved)
^{(3)} – As per statistical convention in football, matches decided in extra time are counted as wins and losses, while matches decided by penalty shoot-outs are counted as draws.

Source: UEFA
