= Austria national football team results (2020–present) =

- Win Draw Loss

This article provides details of international football matches played by the Austria national football team from 2020 to present.

== Results ==
=== 2020 ===
27 March 2020 Friendly	Wales	Cancelled	Austria	Swansea, Wales
19:45 UTC+0				Stadium: Liberty Stadium
Note: The match was cancelled due to the COVID-19 pandemic.

30 March 2020 Friendly	Austria	Cancelled	Turkey	Vienna, Austria
20:45 UTC+2				Stadium: Ernst-Happel-Stadion
Note: The match was cancelled due to the COVID-19 pandemic.

2 June 2020 Friendly	Austria	Cancelled	England	Vienna, Austria

7 June 2020 Friendly	Czech Republic	Cancelled	Austria	Prague, Czech Republic
18:00 UTC+2
Note: The match was cancelled due to the COVID-19 pandemic.

4 September 2020 2020–21 Nations League	Norway	1–2	Austria	Oslo, Norway
20:45 UTC+2	Haaland 66'	Report	Gregoritsch 35'; Sabitzer 54' (pen.)	Stadium: Ullevaal Stadion; Attendance: 0 (Note: Due to the COVID-19 pandemic in Europe, all matches scheduled for September 2020 were played behind closed doors.); Referee: Mattias Gestranius (Finland)

7 September 2020 2020–21 Nations League	Austria	2–3	Romania	Klagenfurt, Austria
20:45 UTC+2	Baumgartner 17'; Onisiwo 81'	Report	Alibec 3'; Grigore 51'; Maxim 70'	Stadium: Wörthersee Stadion; Attendance: 0 Referee: Glenn Nyberg (Sweden)

7 October 2020 Friendly	Austria	2–1	Greece	Klagenfurt, Austria
20:30 UTC+2	Grbić 77'; Baumgartner 80'	Report	Fortounis 63'	Stadium: Wörthersee Stadion; Attendance: 1,500; Referee: Matej Jug (Slovenia)

11 October 2020 2020–21 Nations League	Northern Ireland	0–1	Austria	Belfast, Northern Ireland
19:45 UTC+1		Report	Gregoritsch 42'	Stadium: Windsor Park; Attendance: 600; Referee: Petr Ardeleánu (Czech Republic)

14 October 2020 2020–21 Nations League	Romania	0–1	Austria	Ploiești, Romania
21:45 UTC+3		Report	Schöpf 76'	Stadium: Ilie Oană Stadium; Attendance: 0 Referee: Daniel Stefański (Poland)

11 November 2020 Friendly	Luxembourg	0–3	Austria	Luxembourg City, Luxembourg
20:30 UTC+1		Report	Trauner 61'; Grbić 83'; Wiesinger 90+3'	Stadium: Stade Josy Barthel; Attendance: 0 Referee: Amaury Delerue (France)

15 November 2020 2020–21 Nations League	Austria	2–1	Northern Ireland	Vienna, Austria
20:45 UTC+1	Schaub 81'; Grbić 87'	Report	Magennis 75'	Stadium: Ernst-Happel-Stadion; Attendance: 0 Referee: Maurizio Mariani (Italy)

18 November 2020 2020–21 Nations League	Austria	1–1	Norway	Vienna, Austria
20:45 UTC+1	Grbić 90+4'	Report	Zahid 61'	Stadium: Ernst-Happel-Stadion; Attendance: 0 Referee: Benoît Bastien (France)

=== 2021 ===
25 March 2021 2022 World Cup qualification	Scotland	2–2	Austria	Glasgow, Scotland
19:45 UTC+0	Hanley 71'; McGinn 85'	Report	Kalajdžić 55', 80'	Stadium: Hampden Park; Attendance: 0 Referee: Carlos del Cerro Grande (Spain)

28 March 2021 2022 World Cup qualification	Austria	3–1	Faroe Islands	Vienna, Austria
20:45 UTC+2	Dragović 30'; Baumgartliner 37'; Kalajdžić 44'	Report	Nattestad 19'	Stadium: Ernst-Happel-Stadion; Attendance: 0 Referee: Kateryna Monzul (Ukraine)

31 March 2021 2022 World Cup qualification	Austria	0–4	Denmark	Vienna, Austria
20:45 UTC+2		Report	Skov Olsen 58', 74'; Mæhle 63'; Højbjerg 67'	Stadium: Ernst-Happel-Stadion; Attendance: 0 Referee: Artur Soares Dias (Portugal)

2 June 2021 Friendly	England	1–0	Austria	Middlesbrough, England
20:00 UTC+1	Saka 56'	Report		Stadium: Riverside Stadium; Attendance: 0 Referee: Lawrence Visser (Belgium)
Note: The match was originally scheduled for 2 June 2020 at the Ernst-Happel-Stadion, Vienna, but postponed due to the COVID-19 pandemic in Austria.

6 June 2021 Friendly	Austria	0–0	Slovakia	Vienna, Austria
17:30 UTC+2		Report		Stadium: Ernst Happel Stadion; Attendance: 0 Referee: Urs Schnyder (Switzerland)

13 June 2021 Euro 2020 Group C	Austria	3–1	North Macedonia	Bucharest, Romania
19:00 UTC+3	Lainer 18'; Gregoritsch 78'; Arnautović 89'	Report	Pandev 28'	Stadium: Arena Națională; Attendance: 9,082; Referee: Andreas Ekberg (Sweden)

17 June 2021 Euro 2020 Group C	Netherlands	2–0	Austria	Amsterdam, Netherlands
21:00 UTC+2	Depay 11' (pen.); Dumfries 67'	Report		Stadium: Johan Cruyff Arena; Attendance: 15,243; Referee: Orel Grinfeld (Israel)

21 June 2021 Euro 2020 Group C	Ukraine	0–1	Austria	Bucharest, Romania
19:00 UTC+3		Report	Baumgartner 21'	Stadium: Arena Națională; Attendance: 10,472; Referee: Cüneyt Çakır (Turkey)

26 June 2021 Euro 2020 Round of 16	Italy	2–1 (a.e.t.)	Austria	London, England
20:00 UTC+1	Chiesa 95'; Pessina 105'	Report	Kalajdžić 114'	Stadium: Wembley Stadium; Attendance: 18,910; Referee: Anthony Taylor (England)

1 September 2021 2022 World Cup qualification	Moldova	0–2	Austria	Chișinău, Moldova
22:15 UTC+3 (Note: The Moldova v Austria match, originally to be played at 20:45 UTC+2, was delayed by 30 minutes because a drone invaded the pitch.)		Report	Baumgartner 45+1'; Arnautović 90+4'	Stadium: Stadionul Zimbru; Attendance: 3,945; Referee: Paul Tierney (England)

4 September 2021 2022 World Cup qualification	Israel	5–2	Austria	Haifa, Israel
21:45 UTC+3	Solomon 5'; Dabbur 20'; Zahavi 33', 90+1'; Weissman 58'	Report (FIFA); Report (UEFA)	Baumgartner 55'; Arnautović 55'	Stadium: Sammy Ofer Stadium; Attendance: 13,550; Referee: Felix Zwayer (Germany)

7 September 2021 2022 World Cup qualification	Austria	0–1	Scotland	Vienna, Austria
20:45 UTC+2		Report	Dykes 30' (pen.)	Stadium: Ernst-Happel-Stadion; Attendance: 18,800; Referee: Georgi Kabakov (Bulgaria)

9 October 2021 2022 World Cup qualification	Faroe Islands	0–2	Austria	Tórshavn, Faroe Islands
19:45 UTC+1		Report	Laimer 26'; Sabitzer 48'	Stadium: Tórsvøllur; Attendance: 3,021; Referee: Irfan Peljto (Bosnia and Herzegovina)

12 October 2021 2022 World Cup qualification	Denmark	1–0	Austria	Copenhagen, Denmark
20:45 UTC+1	Mæhle 53'	Report		Stadium: Parken Stadium; Attendance: 35,843; Referee: Ivan Kružliak (Slovakia)

12 November 2021 2022 World Cup qualification	Austria	4–2	Israel	Klagenfurt, Austria
20:45 UTC+1	Arnautović 51' (pen.); Schaub 62', 72'; Sabitzer 84'	Report (FIFA); Report (UEFA)	Bitton 33'; Peretz 59'	Stadium: Wörthersee Stadion; Attendance: 4,300; Referee: Ovidiu Hațegan (Romania)

15 November 2021 2022 World Cup qualification	Austria	4–1	Moldova	Klagenfurt, Austria
20:45 UTC+1	Arnautović 4', 55' (pen.); Trimmel 22'; Ljubicic 83'	Report	Nicolaescu 60'	Stadium: Wörthersee Stadion; Attendance: 1,800; Referee: Aleksandar Stavrev (North Macedonia)

=== 2022 ===
24 March 2022 2022 World Cup qualification play-offs	Wales	2–1	Austria	Cardiff, Wales
19:45 UTC+0	Bale 25', 51'	Report	Sabitzer 65'	Stadium: Cardiff City Stadium; Attendance: 32,053; Referee: Szymon Marciniak (Poland)

29 March 2022 Friendly	Austria	2–2	Scotland	Vienna, Austria
20:45 UTC+2	Gregoritsch 75'; Schöpf 82'	Report	Hendry 28'; McGinn 56'	Stadium: Ernst-Happel-Stadion; Attendance: 6,600; Referee: Tamás Bognár (Hungary)

3 June 2022 2022–23 Nations League	Croatia	0–3	Austria	Osijek, Croatia
20:45 UTC+2		Report	Arnautović 41'; Gregoritsch 54'; Sabitzer 57'	Stadium: Gradski vrt Attendance: 13,994; Referee: Chris Kavanagh (England)

6 June 2022 2022–23 Nations League	Austria	1–2	Denmark	Vienna, Austria
22:15 UTC+2 (Note: The match was originally scheduled to kick-off at 20:45, but was delayed to 22:15 due to a power outage in the stadium area.)	Schlager 67'	Report	Højbjerg 28'; Stryger Larsen 84'	Stadium: Ernst-Happel-Stadion; Attendance: 18,700; Referee: Willie Collum (Scotland)

10 June 2022 2022–23 Nations League	Austria	1–1	France	Vienna, Austria
20:45 UTC+2	Weimann 37'	Report	Mbappé 83'	Stadium: Ernst-Happel-Stadion; Attendance: 44,800; Referee: Anastasios Sidiropoulos (Greece)

13 June 2022 2022–23 Nations League	Denmark	2–0	Austria	Copenhagen, Denmark
20:45 UTC+2	Wind 21'; Skov Olsen 37'	Report		Stadium: Parken Stadion; Attendance: 35,230; Referee: Alejandro Hernández Hernández (Spain)

22 September 2022 2022–23 Nations League	France	2–0	Austria	Saint-Denis, France
20:45 UTC+2	Mbappé 56'; Giroud 65'	Report		Stadium: Stade de France; Attendance: 70,188; Referee: Andreas Ekberg (Sweden)

25 September 2022 2022–23 Nations League	Austria	1–3	Croatia	Vienna, Austria
20:45 UTC+2	Baumgartner 9'	Report	Modrić 6'; Livaja 69'; Lovren 72'	Stadium: Ernst-Happel-Stadion; Attendance: 45,700; Referee: Artur Soares Dias (Portugal)

16 November 2022 Friendly	Andorra	0–1	Austria	Málaga, Spain
18:00 UTC+1		Report	Arnautović 87'	Stadium: La Rosaleda Stadium; Attendance: 150; Referee: José Luis Munuera Montero (Spain)

20 November 2022 Friendly	Austria	2–0	Italy	Vienna, Austria
20:45	Schlager 6'; Alaba 35'	Report		Stadium: Ernst-Happel-Stadion; Attendance: 18,000; Referee: Christian Dingert (Germany)

=== 2023 ===
24 March 2023 Euro 2024 qualifying	Austria	4–1	Azerbaijan	Linz, Austria
20:45	Sabitzer 28', 50'; Gregoritsch 29'; Baumgartner 69'	Report	Mahmudov 64'	Stadium: Raiffeisen Arena; Attendance: 16,500; Referee: Bartosz Frankowski (Poland)

27 March 2023 Euro 2024 qualifying	Austria	2–1	Estonia	Linz, Austria
20:45	Kainz 68'; Gregoritsch 88'	Report	Sappinen 25'	Stadium: Raiffeisen Arena; Attendance: 16,500; Referee: Enea Jorgji (Albania)

17 June 2023 Euro 2024 qualifying	Belgium	1–1	Austria	Brussels, Belgium
20:45	Lukaku 62'	Report	Gregoritsch 22'	Stadium: King Baudouin Stadium; Attendance: 39,237; Referee: Jérôme Brisard (France)

20 June 2023 Euro 2024 qualifying	Austria	2–0	Sweden	Vienna, Austria
20:45	Baumgartner 81', 89'	Report		Stadium: Ernst-Happel-Stadion; Attendance: 46,300; Referee: Marco Guida (Italy)

7 September 2023 Friendly	Austria	1–1	Moldova	Linz, Austria
20:30	Gregoritsch 50'	Report	Damașcan 3'	Stadium: Raiffeisen Arena; Attendance: 13,200; Referee: Robert Jones (England)

12 September 2023 Euro 2024 qualifying	Sweden	1–3	Austria	Solna, Sweden
20:45	Holm 90'	Report	Gregoritsch 53'; Arnautović 56', 69' (pen.)	Stadium: Friends Arena; Attendance: 43,228; Referee: Serdar Gözübüyük (Netherlands)

13 October 2023 Euro 2024 qualifying	Austria	2–3	Belgium	Vienna, Austria
20:45	Laimer 72'; Sabitzer 84' (pen.)	Report	Lukebakio 12', 55'; Lukaku 58'; Onana (yellow card) 35' (yellow-red card) 78'	Stadium: Ernst-Happel-Stadion; Attendance: 47,000; Referee: Jesús Gil Manzano (Spain)

16 October 2023 Euro 2024 qualifying	Azerbaijan	0–1	Austria	Baku, Azerbaijan
18:00		Report	Sabitzer 48' (pen.); Burgstaller (yellow card) 90+2' (yellow-red card) 90+5'	Stadium: Tofiq Bahramov Republican Stadium; Attendance: 4,446; Referee: Aristotelis Diamantopoulos (Greece)

16 November 2023 Euro 2024 qualifying	Estonia	0–2	Austria	Tallinn, Estonia
18:00		Report	Laimer 25'; Lienhart 39'	Stadium: Lilleküla Stadium; Attendance: 4,488; Referee: Nikola Dabanović (Montenegro)

21 November 2023 Friendly	Austria	2–0	Germany	Vienna, Austria
20:45	Sabitzer 29'; Baumgartner 73'	Report	Sané (red card) 49'	Stadium: Ernst-Happel-Stadion; Attendance: 50,000; Referee: Slavko Vinčić (Slovenia)

=== 2024 ===
23 March 2024 Friendly	Slovakia	0–2	Austria	Bratislava, Slovakia
18:00		Report	Baumgartner 1'; Weimann 82'	Stadium: Tehelné pole Attendance: 9,912; Referee: Trustin Farrugia Cann (Malta)

26 March 2024 Friendly	Austria	6–1	Turkey	Vienna, Austria
20:45	Schlager 2'; Gregoritsch 44', 48', 59' (pen.); Baumgartner 78' (pen.); Entrup 90+5'	Report	Çalhanoğlu 25' (pen.)	Stadium: Ernst-Happel-Stadion; Attendance: 38,500; Referee: Daniele Chiffi (Italy)

4 June 2024 Friendly	Austria	2–1	Serbia	Vienna, Austria
19:45 CEST	Wimmer 10'; Baumgartner 13'	Report	Pavlović 35'	Stadium: Ernst-Happel-Stadion; Attendance: 37,800; Referee: António Nobre (Portugal)

8 June 2024 Friendly	Switzerland	1–1	Austria	St. Gallen, Switzerland
18:00 UTC+2	Widmer 23'	Report	Baumgartner 5'	Stadium: Kybunpark; Attendance: 18,731; Referee: Maria Sole Ferrieri Caputi (Italy)

17 June 2024 Euro 2024 Group D	Austria	0–1	France	Düsseldorf, Germany
21:00		Report	Wöber 38' (o.g.)	Stadium: Merkur Spiel-Arena; Attendance: 46,425; Referee: Jesús Gil Manzano (Spain)

21 June 2024 Euro 2024 Group D	Poland	1–3	Austria	Berlin, Germany
18:00	Piątek 30'	Report	Trauner 9'; Baumgartner 66'; Arnautović 78' (pen.)	Stadium: Olympiastadion; Attendance: 69,455; Referee: Halil Umut Meler (Turkey)

25 June 2024 Euro 2024 Group D	Netherlands	2–3	Austria	Berlin, Germany
18:00	Gakpo 47'; Depay 75'	Report	Malen 6' (o.g.); Schmid 59'; Sabitzer 80'	Stadium: Olympiastadion; Attendance: 68,363; Referee: Ivan Kružliak (Slovakia)

2 July 2024 Euro 2024 Round of 16	Austria	1–2	Turkey	Leipzig, Germany
21:00	Gregoritsch 66'	Report	Demiral 1', 59'	Stadium: Red Bull Arena; Attendance: 38,305; Referee: Artur Soares Dias (Portugal)

6 September 2024 2024–25 Nations League	Slovenia	1–1	Austria	Ljubljana, Slovenia
20:45 UTC+2	Šeško 16' (pen.)	Report	Laimer 28'	Stadium: Stožice Stadium; Attendance: 14,834; Referee: Radu Petrescu (Romania)

9 September 2024 2024–25 Nations League	Norway	2–1	Austria	Oslo, Norway
20:45 UTC+2	Mhyre 9'; Haaland 80'	Report	Sabitzer 37'	Stadium: Ullevaal Stadion; Attendance: 23,171; Referee: Nikola Dabanović (Montenegro)

10 October 2024 2024–25 Nations League	Austria	4–0	Kazakhstan	Linz, Austria
20:45 UTC+2	Baumgartner 10'; Lienhart 54'; Sabitzer 56'; Seidl 79'	Report		Stadium: Raiffeisen Arena; Attendance: 14,500; Referee: Don Robertson (Scotland)

13 October 2024 2024–25 Nations League	Austria	5–1	Norway	Linz, Austria
20:45 UTC+2	Arnautović 8', 49' (pen.); Lienhart 58'; Posch 62'; Gregoritsch 79'	Report	Sørloth 39'	Stadium: Raiffeisen Arena; Attendance: 16,500; Referee: Tamás Bognár (Hungary)

14 November 2024 2024–25 Nations League	Kazakhstan	0–2	Austria	Almaty, Kazakhstan
21:00 UTC+6		Report	Baumgartner 15'; Gregoritsch 25'	Stadium: Almaty Central Stadium; Attendance: 9,753; Referee: Marian Barbu (Romania)

17 November 2024 2024–25 Nations League	Austria	1–1	Slovenia	Vienna, Austria
18:00 UTC+1	Schmid 27'	Report	Gnezda Čerin 81'	Stadium: Ernst Happel Stadion; Attendance: 46,000; Referee: Glenn Nyberg (Sweden)

=== 2025 ===
20 March 2025 2024–25 Nations League promotion play-offs	Austria	1–1	Serbia	Vienna, Austria
20:45 UTC+1	Gregoritsch 37'	Report	Samardžić 61'	Stadium: Ernst-Happel-Stadion; Attendance: 46,400; Referee: João Pinheiro (Portugal)

23 March 2025 2024–25 Nations League promotion play-offs	Serbia	2–0 (3–1 agg.)	Austria	Belgrade, Serbia
18:00 UTC+1	N. Maksimović 56'; Vlahović 90'	Report		Stadium: Red Star Stadium; Attendance: 22,112; Referee: José María Sánchez (Spain)

7 June 2025 2026 World Cup qualification	Austria	2–1	Romania	Vienna, Austria
20:45 UTC+2	Gregoritsch 42'; Sabitzer 60'	Report	Tănase 90+5'	Stadium: Ernst-Happel-Stadion; Attendance: 48,500; Referee: Maurizio Mariani (Italy)

10 June 2025 2026 World Cup qualification	San Marino	0–4	Austria	Serravalle, San Marino
20:45 UTC+2		Report	Arnautović 3', 15'; Gregoritsch 11'; Baumgartner 27'	Stadium: San Marino Stadium; Attendance: 3,075; Referee: Ondřej Berka (Czech Republic)

6 September 2025 2026 World Cup qualification	Austria	1–0	Cyprus	Linz, Austria
20:45 UTC+2	Sabitzer 54' (pen.)	Report		Stadium: Raiffeisen Arena; Attendance: 16,300; Referee: Jakob Kehlet (Denmark)

9 September 2025 2026 World Cup qualification	Bosnia and Herzegovina	1–2	Austria	Zenica, Bosnia and Herzegovina
20:45 UTC+2	Džeko 50'	Report	Sabitzer 49'; Laimer 65'	Stadium: Bilino Polje Stadium; Attendance: 11,700; Referee: Jesús Gil Manzano (Spain)

9 October 2025 2026 World Cup qualification	Austria	10–0	San Marino	Vienna, Austria
20:45 UTC+2	Schmid 7'; Arnautović 8', 47', 83', 84'; Gregoritsch 24'; Posch 30', 42'; Laimer 45'; Wurmbrand 76'	Report		Stadium: Ernst-Happel-Stadion; Attendance: 37,500; Referee: Yigal Frid (Israel)

12 October 2025 2026 World Cup qualification	Romania	1–0	Austria	Bucharest, Romania
21:45 UTC+3	Ghiță 90+5'	Report		Stadium: National Arena; Attendance: 39,581; Referee: Davide Massa (Italy)

15 November 2025 2026 World Cup qualification	Cyprus	0–2	Austria	Limassol, Cyprus
19:00 UTC+2		Report	Arnautović 18' (pen.), 55'	Stadium: Alphamega Stadium; Attendance: 6,012; Referee: Urs Schnyder (Switzerland)

18 November 2025 2026 World Cup qualification	Austria	1–1	Bosnia and Herzegovina	Vienna, Austria
20:45 UTC+1	Gregoritsch 77'	Report	Tabaković 12'	Stadium: Ernst-Happel-Stadion; Attendance: 48,000; Referee: João Pinheiro (Portugal)

=== 2026 ===
27 March 2026 Friendly	Austria	5–1	Ghana	Vienna, Austria
18:00 UTC+1	Sabitzer 12' (pen.); Gregoritsch 51'; Posch 59'; Chukwumeka 79'; Seiwald 90+2'	Report	J. Ayew 77'	Stadium: Ernst-Happel-Stadion; Attendance: 40,200; Referee: Mohammed Al Hoish (Saudi Arabia)

31 March 2026 Friendly	Austria	1–0	South Korea	Vienna, Austria
20:45 UTC+2	Sabitzer 48'	Report		Stadium: Ernst-Happel-Stadion; Attendance: 35,300; Referee: Sander van der Eijk (Netherlands)

1 June 2026 Friendly	Austria	1–0	Tunisia	Vienna, Austria
20:45 UTC+2	Sabitzer 63'	Report		Stadium: Ernst-Happel-Stadion; Attendance: 35,100; Referee: Jérémie Pignard (France)

10 June 2026 Friendly	Guatemala	Cancelled	Austria	Pasadena, United States
21:00 UTC−7				Stadium: Rose Bowl
Note: The game was cancelled because of organizational problems.

16 June 2026 2026 World Cup Group J	Austria	3–1	Jordan	Santa Clara, United States
21:00 UTC−7	Schmid 21'; Al-Arab 76' (o.g.); Arnautović 90+12' (pen.)	Report	Olwan 50'	Stadium: Levi's Stadium; Attendance: 68,527; Referee: Dahane Beida (Mauritania)

22 June 2026 2026 World Cup Group J	Argentina	2–0	Austria	Arlington, United States
12:00 UTC−5	Messi 38', 90+5'	Report		Stadium: AT&T Stadium; Attendance: 70,649; Referee: Amin Omar (Egypt)

27 June 2026 2026 World Cup Group J	Algeria	3–3	Austria	Kansas City, United States
21:00 UTC−5	Belghali 45'; Mahrez 60', 90+3'	Report	Arnautović 28'; Sabitzer 55'; Kalajdžić 90+6'	Stadium: Arrowhead Stadium; Attendance: 69,045; Referee: Ilgiz Tantashev (Uzbekistan)

2 July 2026 2026 World Cup Round of 32	Spain	3–0	Austria	Inglewood, United States
12:00 UTC−7	Oyarzabal 36', 89'; Porro 66'	Report		Stadium: SoFi Stadium; Attendance: 70,492; Referee: Glenn Nyberg (Sweden)

24 September 2026 2026–27 Nations League	Austria	3–1	Israel	Linz, Austria
20:45 UTC+2	Schmid 43' (pen.); Mwene 90'; Kalajdžić 90+3'	Report	Abu Farchi 55'	Stadium: Raiffeisen Arena; Attendance: 15,200; Referee: Georgi Kabakov (Bulgaria)

27 September 2026 2026–27 Nations League	Austria	3–1	Kosovo	Vienna, Austria
18:00 UTC+2	Affengruber 23'; Adamu 45+2'; Chukwuemeka 61'	Report	Zhegrova 83' (pen.)	Stadium: Ernst-Happel-Stadion; Attendance: 47,000; Referee: Nick Walsh (Scotland)

1 October 2026 2026–27 Nations League	Republic of Ireland	2–2	Austria	Dublin, Ireland
19:45 UTC+1	Parrott 12', 45' (pen.)	Report	Prass 71'; Gregoritsch 77'	Stadium: Aviva Stadium; Attendance: 45,784; Referee: Allard Lindhout (Netherlands)

4 October 2026 2026–27 Nations League	Kosovo	1–1	Austria	Pristina, Kosovo
18:00 UTC+2	Asllani 70'	Report	Lang 85'	Stadium: Fadil Vokrri Stadium; Attendance: 12,567; Referee: António Nobre (Portugal)

14 November 2026 2026–27 Nations League	Austria	1–0	Republic of Ireland	Linz, Austria
20:45 UTC+1	Kalajdžić 78'	Report		Stadium: Raiffeisen Arena; Attendance: 16,700; Referee: Irfan Peljto (Bosnia and Herzegovina)

17 November 2026 2026–27 Nations League	Israel	1–1	Austria	Debrecen, Hungary (Note: Due to the Gaza war, Israel are required to play their home matches at neutral venues until further notice.)
21:45 UTC+2	Do. Peretz 36'	Report	Kalajdžić 62'	Stadium: Nagyerdei Stadion; Attendance: 510; Referee: Davide Massa (Italy)
