= Austria at the UEFA European Championship =

International football delegation

Austria have appeared in four editions of the UEFA European Championship: 2008, 2016, 2020, and 2024.

As a host nation, Austria qualified automatically for Euro 2008, marking their debut in the tournament. After losing their opening game and drawing the second, the co-hosts still had a theoretical chance to advance to the second round, but were eliminated after a 0–1 loss to Germany.

For Euro 2016, Austria qualified as winners of their qualifying group, before once again exiting in the group stage after only picking up one point. They qualified for Euro 2020 by finishing second in their group, and reached the knockout stage at the tournament for the first time, before being eliminated by Italy in the round of 16 after extra time. At Euro 2024, Austria finished top of their group for the first time, ahead of former winners France and the Netherlands, qualifying for the knockout stage for a second time; they would again lose in the round of 16, this time to Turkey.

== Overall record ==
UEFA European Championship record										Qualification record					
Year	Round	Position	Pld	W	D*	L	GF	GA	Squad	Pld	W	D	L	GF	GA
(France) 1960	Did not qualify									4	2	0	2	10	11
(Spain) 1964	Did not qualify									2	0	1	1	2	3
(Italy) 1968	Did not qualify									5	2	1	2	7	9
(Belgium) 1972	Did not qualify									6	3	1	2	14	6
(Socialist Federal Republic of Yugoslavia) 1976	Did not qualify									6	3	1	2	11	7
(Italy) 1980	Did not qualify									8	4	3	1	14	7
(France) 1984	Did not qualify									8	4	1	3	15	10
(West Germany) 1988	Did not qualify									6	2	1	3	6	9
(Sweden) 1992	Did not qualify									8	1	1	6	6	14
(England) 1996	Did not qualify									10	5	1	4	29	14
(Belgium) (Netherlands) 2000	Did not qualify									8	4	1	3	19	20
(Portugal) 2004	Did not qualify									8	3	0	5	12	14
(Austria) (Switzerland) 2008	Group stage	13th	3	0	1	2	1	3	Squad	Qualified as hosts					
(Poland) (Ukraine) 2012	Did not qualify									10	3	3	4	16	17
(France) 2016	Group stage	19th	3	0	1	2	1	4	Squad	10	9	1	0	22	5
(Europe) 2020	Round of 16	12th	4	2	0	2	5	5	Squad	10	6	1	3	19	9
(Germany) 2024	Round of 16	9th	4	2	0	2	7	6	Squad	8	6	1	1	17	7
(United Kingdom) (Republic of Ireland) 2028	To be determined									To be determined					
(Italy) (Turkey) 2032	To be determined									To be determined					
Total	Round of 16	4/17	14	4	2	8	14	18	—	117	57	18	42	219	162

== Euro 2008 ==
=== Group stage ===
Pos	Team	Pld	W	D	L	GF	GA	GD	Pts	Qualification
1	Croatia	3	3	0	0	4	1	+3	9	Advance to knockout stage
2	Germany	3	2	0	1	4	2	+2	6	Advance to knockout stage
3	Austria (H)	3	0	1	2	1	3	−2	1 (Note: Tied on head-to-head result (Austria 1–1 Poland). Overall goal difference was used as the tiebreaker.)	
4	Poland	3	0	1	2	1	4	−3	1	

Source: UEFA
Rules for classification: Group stage tiebreakers
(H) Hosts
Notes:
8 June 2008
18:00

Austria	0–1	Croatia
	Report	Modrić 4' (pen.)

Ernst-Happel-Stadion, Vienna
Attendance: 51,428
Referee: Pieter Vink (Netherlands)

12 June 2008
20:45

Austria	1–1	Poland
Vastić 90+3' (pen.)	Report	Guerreiro 30'

Ernst-Happel-Stadion, Vienna
Attendance: 51,428
Referee: Howard Webb (England)

16 June 2008
20:45

Austria	0–1	Germany
	Report	Ballack 49'

Ernst-Happel-Stadion, Vienna
Attendance: 51,428
Referee: Manuel Mejuto González (Spain)

== Euro 2016 ==
=== Group stage ===
Pos	Team	Pld	W	D	L	GF	GA	GD	Pts	Qualification
1	Hungary	3	1	2	0	6	4	+2	5 (Note: Tied on head-to-head result (Iceland 1–1 Hungary). Overall goal difference was used as the tiebreaker.)	Advance to knockout stage
2	Iceland	3	1	2	0	4	3	+1	5	Advance to knockout stage
3	Portugal	3	0	3	0	4	4	0	3	Advance to knockout stage
4	Austria	3	0	1	2	1	4	−3	1	

Source: UEFA
Rules for classification: Group stage tiebreakers
Notes:
14 June 2016
18:00

Austria	0–2	Hungary
	Report	Szalai 62'; Stieber 87'

Stade de Bordeaux, Bordeaux
Attendance: 34,424
Referee: Clément Turpin (France)

18 June 2016
21:00

Portugal	0–0	Austria
	Report

Parc des Princes, Paris
Attendance: 44,291
Referee: Nicola Rizzoli (Italy)

22 June 2016
18:00

Iceland	2–1	Austria
Böðvarsson 18'; Traustason 90+4'	Report	Schöpf 60'

Stade de France, Saint-Denis
Attendance: 68,714
Referee: Szymon Marciniak (Poland)

== Euro 2020 ==
=== Group stage ===
Pos	Team	Pld	W	D	L	GF	GA	GD	Pts	Qualification
1	Netherlands (H)	3	3	0	0	8	2	+6	9	Advance to knockout stage
2	Austria	3	2	0	1	4	3	+1	6	Advance to knockout stage
3	Ukraine	3	1	0	2	4	5	−1	3	Advance to knockout stage
4	North Macedonia	3	0	0	3	2	8	−6	0	

Source: UEFA
Rules for classification: Group stage tiebreakers
(H) Hosts
13 June 2021
18:00 (19:00 UTC+3)

Austria	3–1	North Macedonia
Lainer 18'; Gregoritsch 78'; Arnautović 89'	Report	Pandev 28'

Arena Națională, Bucharest
Attendance: 9,082
Referee: Andreas Ekberg (Sweden)

17 June 2021
21:00

Netherlands	2–0	Austria
Depay 11' (pen.); Dumfries 67'	Report

Johan Cruyff Arena, Amsterdam
Attendance: 15,243
Referee: Orel Grinfeld (Israel)

21 June 2021
18:00 (19:00 UTC+3)

Ukraine	0–1	Austria
	Report	Baumgartner 21'

Arena Națională, Bucharest
Attendance: 10,472
Referee: Cüneyt Çakır (Turkey)

=== Knockout stage ===
Round of 16

26 June 2021
21:00 (20:00 UTC+1)

Italy	2–1 (a.e.t.)	Austria
Chiesa 95'; Pessina 105'	Report	Kalajdžić 114'

Wembley Stadium, London
Attendance: 18,910
Referee: Anthony Taylor (England)

== Euro 2024 ==
=== Group stage ===
Pos	Team	Pld	W	D	L	GF	GA	GD	Pts	Qualification
1	Austria	3	2	0	1	6	4	+2	6	Advance to knockout stage
2	France	3	1	2	0	2	1	+1	5	Advance to knockout stage
3	Netherlands	3	1	1	1	4	4	0	4	Advance to knockout stage
4	Poland	3	0	1	2	3	6	−3	1	

Source: UEFA
17 June 2024
21:00

Austria	0–1	France
	Report	Wöber 38' (o.g.)

Merkur Spiel-Arena, Düsseldorf
Attendance: 46,425
Referee: Jesús Gil Manzano (Spain)

21 June 2024
18:00

Poland	1–3	Austria
Piątek 30'	Report	Trauner 9'; Baumgartner 66'; Arnautović 78' (pen.)

Olympiastadion, Berlin
Attendance: 69,455
Referee: Halil Umut Meler (Turkey)

25 June 2024
18:00

Netherlands	2–3	Austria
Gakpo 47'; Depay 75'	Report	Malen 6' (o.g.); Schmid 59'; Sabitzer 80'

Olympiastadion, Berlin
Attendance: 68,363
Referee: Ivan Kružliak (Slovakia)

=== Knockout stage ===
Round of 16

2 July 2024
21:00

Austria	1–2	Turkey
Gregoritsch 66'	Report	Demiral 1', 59'

Red Bull Arena, Leipzig
Attendance: 38,305
Referee: Artur Soares Dias (Portugal)

== See also ==
- Austria at the FIFA World Cup

== Head-to-head record ==
Opponent	Pld	W	D	L	GF	GA	GD	Win %
Croatia	1	0	0	1	0	1	−1	0.00
France	1	0	0	1	0	1	−1	0.00
Germany	1	0	0	1	0	1	−1	0.00
Hungary	1	0	0	1	0	2	−2	0.00
Iceland	1	0	0	1	1	2	−1	0.00
Italy	1	0	0	1	1	2	−1	0.00
Netherlands	2	1	0	1	3	4	−1	50.00
North Macedonia	1	1	0	0	3	1	+2	100.00
Poland	2	1	1	0	4	2	+2	50.00
Portugal	1	0	1	0	0	0	+0	0.00
Turkey	1	0	0	1	1	2	−1	0.00
Ukraine	1	1	0	0	1	0	+1	100.00
Total	14	4	2	8	14	18	−4	28.57
