= UEFA Euro 2024 Group E =

Football tournament group stage

Group E of UEFA Euro 2024 took place from 17 to 26 June 2024. The group contained Belgium, Slovakia, Romania, and Ukraine. All four teams finished with four points, making it the first European Championship, and the first major tournament since Group E of the 1994 FIFA World Cup, where all teams in a group had the same amount of points. Ukraine became the first team to finish bottom of a European Championship group while earning as many as four points.

== Teams ==
Draw position	Team	Pot	Method of qualification	Date of qualification	Finals appearance	Last appearance	Previous best performance	Qualifying Rankings November 2023 (Note: The European Qualifiers overall rankings from November 2023 were used for seeding for the final draw.)	FIFA Rankings April 2024
E1	Belgium	1	Group F winner	13 October 2023	7th	2020	Runners-up (1980)	4	3
E2	Slovakia (Note: From 1960 to 1980, Slovakia competed as Czechoslovakia.)	3	Group J runner-up	16 November 2023	6th	2020	Winners (1976)	16	48
E3	Romania	2	Group I winner	18 November 2023	6th	2016	Quarter-finals (2000)	8	46
E4	Ukraine	4	Play-off winner B	26 March 2024	4th	2020	Quarter-finals (2020)	21	22

== Standings ==
Pos	Team	Pld	W	D	L	GF	GA	GD	Pts	Qualification
1	Romania	3	1	1	1	4	3	+1	4	Advance to knockout stage
2	Belgium	3	1	1	1	2	1	+1	4	Advance to knockout stage
3	Slovakia	3	1	1	1	3	3	0	4	Advance to knockout stage
4	Ukraine	3	1	1	1	2	4	−2	4	

Source: UEFA
Rules for classification: Group stage tiebreakers

In the round of 16,

- The winner of Group E, Romania, advanced to play the third-placed team of Group D, the Netherlands.
- The runner-up of Group E, Belgium, advanced to play the runner-up of Group D, France.
- The third-placed team of Group E, Slovakia, advanced to play the winner of Group C, England.

== Matches ==
=== Romania vs Ukraine ===
17 June 2024
15:00

Romania	3–0	Ukraine
Stanciu 29'; R. Marin 53'; Drăguș 57'	Report

Allianz Arena, Munich
Attendance: 61,591
Referee: Glenn Nyberg (Sweden)

Romania	Ukraine

GK	1	Florin Niță
RB	2	Andrei Rațiu
CB	3	Radu Drăgușin
CB	15	Andrei Burcă
LB	11	Nicușor Bancu
DM	6	Marius Marin		(substituted off) 75'
CM	18	Răzvan Marin	(yellow card) 79'
CM	21	Nicolae Stanciu (c)		(substituted off) 87'
RW	20	Dennis Man		(substituted off) 62'
LW	17	Florinel Coman		(substituted off) 62'
CF	19	Denis Drăguș		(substituted off) 75'
Substitutions:
MF	10	Ianis Hagi		(substituted on) 62'
FW	13	Valentin Mihăilă		(substituted on) 62'
DF	4	Adrian Rus		(substituted on) 75'
FW	9	George Pușcaș		(substituted on) 75'
DF	24	Bogdan Racovițan		(substituted on) 87'
Manager:
Edward Iordănescu

GK	23	Andriy Lunin
RB	2	Yukhym Konoplya	(yellow card) 67'	(substituted off) 72'
CB	13	Illya Zabarnyi
CB	22	Mykola Matviyenko
LB	17	Oleksandr Zinchenko
DM	6	Taras Stepanenko (c)		(substituted off) 62'
CM	19	Mykola Shaparenko		(substituted off) 62'
RW	15	Viktor Tsyhankov		(substituted off) 62'
AM	14	Heorhiy Sudakov		(substituted off) 83'
LW	10	Mykhailo Mudryk
CF	11	Artem Dovbyk
Substitutions:
MF	18	Volodymyr Brazhko		(substituted on) 62'
MF	7	Andriy Yarmolenko		(substituted on) 62'
FW	9	Roman Yaremchuk		(substituted on) 62'
DF	24	Oleksandr Tymchyk		(substituted on) 72'
MF	8	Ruslan Malinovskyi		(substituted on) 83'
Manager:
Serhiy Rebrov

Man of the Match:
Nicolae Stanciu (Romania)

Assistant referees:
Mahbod Beigi (Sweden)
Andreas Söderkvist (Sweden)
Fourth official:
Espen Eskås (Norway)
Reserve assistant referee:
Jan Erik Engan (Norway)
Video assistant referee:
Rob Dieperink (Netherlands)
Assistant video assistant referees:
Pol van Boekel (Netherlands)
Jérôme Brisard (France)

=== Belgium vs Slovakia ===
Based on the FIFA Men's World Ranking, Slovakia's win was the biggest upset in UEFA European Championship history, with 45 places separating Belgium (3rd) and Slovakia (48th). This was short lived, however, since Georgia (74th) beat Portugal (6th) 2-0 on June 26 in Group F. 68 places separated Georgia and Portugal, beating the Belgium-Slovakia record by 23 places.

17 June 2024
18:00

Belgium	0–1	Slovakia
	Report	Schranz 7'

Waldstadion, Frankfurt
Attendance: 45,181
Referee: Halil Umut Meler (Turkey)

Belgium	Slovakia

GK	1	Koen Casteels
RB	21	Timothy Castagne
CB	4	Wout Faes
CB	2	Zeno Debast
LB	11	Yannick Carrasco		(substituted off) 84'
CM	18	Orel Mangala	(yellow card) 29'	(substituted off) 57'
CM	24	Amadou Onana
RW	9	Leandro Trossard		(substituted off) 74'
AM	7	Kevin De Bruyne (c)
LW	22	Jérémy Doku		(substituted off) 84'
CF	10	Romelu Lukaku
Substitutions:
FW	19	Johan Bakayoko		(substituted on) 57'
MF	8	Youri Tielemans	(yellow card) 76'	(substituted on) 74'
FW	20	Loïs Openda		(substituted on) 84'
FW	14	Dodi Lukebakio	(yellow card) 85'	(substituted on) 84'
Manager:
(Italy) Domenico Tedesco

GK	1	Martin Dúbravka
RB	2	Peter Pekarík
CB	3	Denis Vavro
CB	14	Milan Škriniar (c)
LB	16	Dávid Hancko
CM	19	Juraj Kucka
CM	22	Stanislav Lobotka
CM	8	Ondrej Duda		(substituted off) 90+4'
RF	26	Ivan Schranz	(yellow card) 41'	(substituted off) 81'
CF	9	Róbert Boženík		(substituted off) 70'
LF	17	Lukáš Haraslín		(substituted off) 70'
Substitutions:
MF	7	Tomáš Suslov		(substituted on) 70'
FW	18	David Strelec		(substituted on) 70'
FW	20	Dávid Ďuriš		(substituted on) 81'
MF	4	Adam Obert		(substituted on) 90+4'
Manager:
(Italy) Francesco Calzona

Man of the Match:
Stanislav Lobotka (Slovakia)

Assistant referees:
Mustafa Emre Eyisoy (Turkey)
Kerem Ersoy (Turkey)
Fourth official:
Serdar Gözübüyük (Netherlands)
Reserve assistant referee:
Johan Balder (Netherlands)
Video assistant referee:
Bastian Dankert (Germany)
Assistant video assistant referees:
Alper Ulusoy (Turkey)
Marco Fritz (Germany)

=== Slovakia vs Ukraine ===
21 June 2024
15:00

Slovakia	1–2	Ukraine
Schranz 17'	Report	Shaparenko 54'; Yaremchuk 80'

Merkur Spiel-Arena, Düsseldorf
Attendance: 43,910
Referee: Michael Oliver (England)

Slovakia	Ukraine

GK	1	Martin Dúbravka
RB	2	Peter Pekarík
CB	3	Denis Vavro
CB	14	Milan Škriniar (c)
LB	16	Dávid Hancko	(substituted off) 67'
CM	19	Juraj Kucka
CM	22	Stanislav Lobotka
CM	8	Ondrej Duda	(substituted off) 60'
RF	26	Ivan Schranz	(substituted off) 86'
CF	9	Róbert Boženík	(substituted off) 60'
LF	17	Lukáš Haraslín	(substituted off) 67'
Substitutions:
MF	11	László Bénes	(substituted on) 60'
FW	18	David Strelec	(substituted on) 60'
MF	7	Tomáš Suslov	(substituted on) 67'
MF	4	Adam Obert	(substituted on) 67'
FW	24	Leo Sauer	(substituted on) 86'
Manager:
(Italy) Francesco Calzona

GK	12	Anatoliy Trubin
RB	24	Oleksandr Tymchyk
CB	13	Illya Zabarnyi
CB	22	Mykola Matviyenko
LB	17	Oleksandr Zinchenko
CM	19	Mykola Shaparenko		(substituted off) 90+2'
CM	18	Volodymyr Brazhko		(substituted off) 85'
CM	14	Heorhiy Sudakov
RF	7	Andriy Yarmolenko (c)		(substituted off) 67'
CF	11	Artem Dovbyk		(substituted off) 67'
LF	10	Mykhailo Mudryk		(substituted off) 85'
Substitutions:
FW	9	Roman Yaremchuk	(yellow card) 84'	(substituted on) 67'
MF	20	Oleksandr Zubkov		(substituted on) 67'
MF	8	Ruslan Malinovskyi		(substituted on) 85'
MF	5	Serhiy Sydorchuk		(substituted on) 85'
DF	4	Maksym Talovyerov		(substituted on) 90+2'
Manager:
Serhiy Rebrov

Man of the Match:
Mykola Shaparenko (Ukraine)

Assistant referees:
Stuart Burt (England)
Dan Cook (England)
Fourth official:
Serdar Gözübüyük (Netherlands)
Reserve assistant referee:
Johan Balder (Netherlands)
Video assistant referee:
Bastian Dankert (Germany)
Assistant video assistant referees:
David Coote (England)
Christian Dingert (Germany)

=== Belgium vs Romania ===
22 June 2024
21:00

Belgium	2–0	Romania
Tielemans 2'; De Bruyne 80'	Report

RheinEnergieStadion, Cologne
Attendance: 42,535
Referee: Szymon Marciniak (Poland)

Belgium	Romania

GK	1	Koen Casteels
CB	21	Timothy Castagne
CB	4	Wout Faes
CB	5	Jan Vertonghen
RM	22	Jérémy Doku		(substituted off) 72'
CM	8	Youri Tielemans		(substituted off) 72'
CM	24	Amadou Onana
LM	3	Arthur Theate		(substituted off) 77'
RF	7	Kevin De Bruyne (c)
CF	10	Romelu Lukaku
LF	14	Dodi Lukebakio	(yellow card) 35'	(substituted off) 56'
Substitutions:
MF	9	Leandro Trossard		(substituted on) 56'
DF	11	Yannick Carrasco		(substituted on) 72'
MF	18	Orel Mangala		(substituted on) 72'
DF	2	Zeno Debast		(substituted on) 77'
Manager:
(Italy) Domenico Tedesco

GK	1	Florin Niță
RB	2	Andrei Rațiu		(substituted off) 90'
CB	3	Radu Drăgușin
CB	15	Andrei Burcă
LB	11	Nicușor Bancu	(yellow card) 59'
DM	6	Marius Marin	(yellow card) 65'	(substituted off) 68'
CM	18	Răzvan Marin
CM	21	Nicolae Stanciu (c)
RW	20	Dennis Man
LW	13	Valentin Mihăilă		(substituted off) 68'
CF	19	Denis Drăguș		(substituted off) 81'
Substitutions:
MF	14	Darius Olaru		(substituted on) 68'
MF	10	Ianis Hagi		(substituted on) 68'
FW	7	Denis Alibec		(substituted on) 81'
MF	23	Deian Sorescu		(substituted on) 90'
Manager:
Edward Iordănescu

Man of the Match:
Kevin De Bruyne (Belgium)

Assistant referees:
Tomasz Listkiewicz (Poland)
Adam Kupsik (Poland)
Fourth official:
Donatas Rumšas (Lithuania)
Reserve assistant referee:
Aleksandr Radiuš (Lithuania)
Video assistant referee:
Tomasz Kwiatkowski (Poland)
Assistant video assistant referees:
Bartosz Frankowski (Poland)
Nejc Kajtazovič (Slovenia)

=== Slovakia vs Romania ===
26 June 2024
18:00

Slovakia	1–1	Romania
Duda 24'	Report	R. Marin 37' (pen.)

Waldstadion, Frankfurt
Attendance: 45,033
Referee: Daniel Siebert (Germany)

Slovakia	Romania

GK	1	Martin Dúbravka
RB	2	Peter Pekarík		(substituted off) 90+2'
CB	3	Denis Vavro
CB	14	Milan Škriniar (c)
LB	16	Dávid Hancko
CM	19	Juraj Kucka
CM	22	Stanislav Lobotka
CM	8	Ondrej Duda	(yellow card) 90+1'	(substituted off) 90+2'
RF	26	Ivan Schranz		(substituted off) 78'
CF	18	David Strelec		(substituted off) 70'
LF	17	Lukáš Haraslín		(substituted off) 70'
Substitutions:
MF	7	Tomáš Suslov		(substituted on) 70'
FW	9	Róbert Boženík		(substituted on) 70'
FW	20	Dávid Ďuriš		(substituted on) 78'
DF	6	Norbert Gyömbér		(substituted on) 90+2'
MF	21	Matúš Bero		(substituted on) 90+2'
Manager:
(Italy) Francesco Calzona

GK	1	Florin Niță
RB	2	Andrei Rațiu
CB	3	Radu Drăgușin
CB	15	Andrei Burcă	(yellow card) 45+1'
LB	11	Nicușor Bancu	(yellow card) 45+4'
DM	6	Marius Marin
CM	18	Răzvan Marin		(substituted off) 86'
CM	21	Nicolae Stanciu (c)
RW	10	Ianis Hagi		(substituted off) 66'
LW	17	Florinel Coman		(substituted off) 58'
CF	19	Denis Drăguș		(substituted off) 66'
Substitutions:
MF	23	Deian Sorescu		(substituted on) 58'
MF	20	Dennis Man		(substituted on) 66'
FW	9	George Pușcaș	(yellow card) 88'	(substituted on) 66'
DF	4	Adrian Rus		(substituted on) 86'
Manager:
Edward Iordănescu			(yellow card) 55'

Man of the Match:
Stanislav Lobotka (Slovakia)

Assistant referees:
Jan Seidel (Germany)
Rafael Foltyn (Germany)
Fourth official:
Felix Zwayer (Germany)
Reserve assistant referee:
Marco Achmüller (Germany)
Video assistant referee:
Bastian Dankert (Germany)
Assistant video assistant referees:
Christian Dingert (Germany)
Massimiliano Irrati (Italy)

=== Ukraine vs Belgium ===
26 June 2024
18:00

Ukraine	0–0	Belgium
	Report

MHPArena, Stuttgart
Attendance: 54,000
Referee: Anthony Taylor (England)

Ukraine	Belgium

GK	12	Anatoliy Trubin
CB	13	Illya Zabarnyi
CB	3	Oleksandr Svatok		(substituted off) 81'
CB	22	Mykola Matviyenko (c)
RWB	24	Oleksandr Tymchyk
LWB	16	Vitaliy Mykolenko		(substituted off) 58'
CM	19	Mykola Shaparenko		(substituted off) 70'
CM	18	Volodymyr Brazhko		(substituted off) 70'
CM	14	Heorhiy Sudakov
CF	9	Roman Yaremchuk		(substituted off) 70'
CF	11	Artem Dovbyk	(yellow card) 69'
Substitutions:
DF	17	Oleksandr Zinchenko		(substituted on) 58'
MF	6	Taras Stepanenko		(substituted on) 70'
MF	8	Ruslan Malinovskyi		(substituted on) 70'
FW	25	Vladyslav Vanat		(substituted on) 70'
MF	7	Andriy Yarmolenko		(substituted on) 81'
Manager:
Serhiy Rebrov

GK	1	Koen Casteels
RB	5	Jan Vertonghen
CB	4	Wout Faes	(yellow card) 43'
CB	3	Arthur Theate
LB	21	Timothy Castagne
CM	7	Kevin De Bruyne (c)
CM	24	Amadou Onana
CM	8	Youri Tielemans		(substituted off) 62'
RF	22	Jérémy Doku		(substituted off) 77'
CF	10	Romelu Lukaku		(substituted off) 90'
LF	9	Leandro Trossard		(substituted off) 62'
Substitutions:
MF	18	Orel Mangala		(substituted on) 62'
MF	11	Yannick Carrasco		(substituted on) 62'
FW	19	Johan Bakayoko		(substituted on) 77'
FW	20	Loïs Openda		(substituted on) 90'
Manager:
(Italy) Domenico Tedesco

Man of the Match:
Kevin De Bruyne (Belgium)

Assistant referees:
Gary Beswick (England)
Adam Nunn (England)
Fourth official:
Glenn Nyberg (Sweden)
Reserve assistant referee:
Mahbod Beigi (Sweden)
Video assistant referee:
Stuart Attwell (England)
Assistant video assistant referees:
David Coote (England)
Marco Fritz (Germany)

== Discipline ==
Fair play points would have been used as a tiebreaker if the head-to-head and overall records of teams had been tied (and if a penalty shoot-out was not applicable as a tiebreaker). These were calculated based on yellow and red cards received by players and team officials in all group matches as follows:

- yellow card = 1 point
- red card as a result of two yellow cards = 3 points
- direct red card = 3 points
- yellow card followed by direct red card = 4 points

Only one of the above deductions was applied to a player or team official in a single match.

Team	Match 1				Match 2				Match 3				Points
Team	Booked	(yellow card) (yellow-red card)	Sent off (straight red)	(yellow card) (red card)	Booked	(yellow card) (yellow-red card)	Sent off (straight red)	(yellow card) (red card)	Booked	(yellow card) (yellow-red card)	Sent off (straight red)	(yellow card) (red card)	Points
Slovakia	1								1				–2
Ukraine	1				1				1				–3
Belgium	3				1				1				–5
Romania	1				2				4				–7

== See also ==
- Belgium at the UEFA European Championship
- Romania at the UEFA European Championship
- Slovakia at the UEFA European Championship
- Ukraine at the UEFA European Championship
- 1994 FIFA World Cup Group E – another group with a similar situation of all four teams scoring the exact same points at the end of group stage
