= Red Bull Arena (Leipzig) =

Football facility in Germany

Coordinates: 51°20′45″N 12°20′54″E

- RB Arena; Leipzig Arena (UEFA competitions)
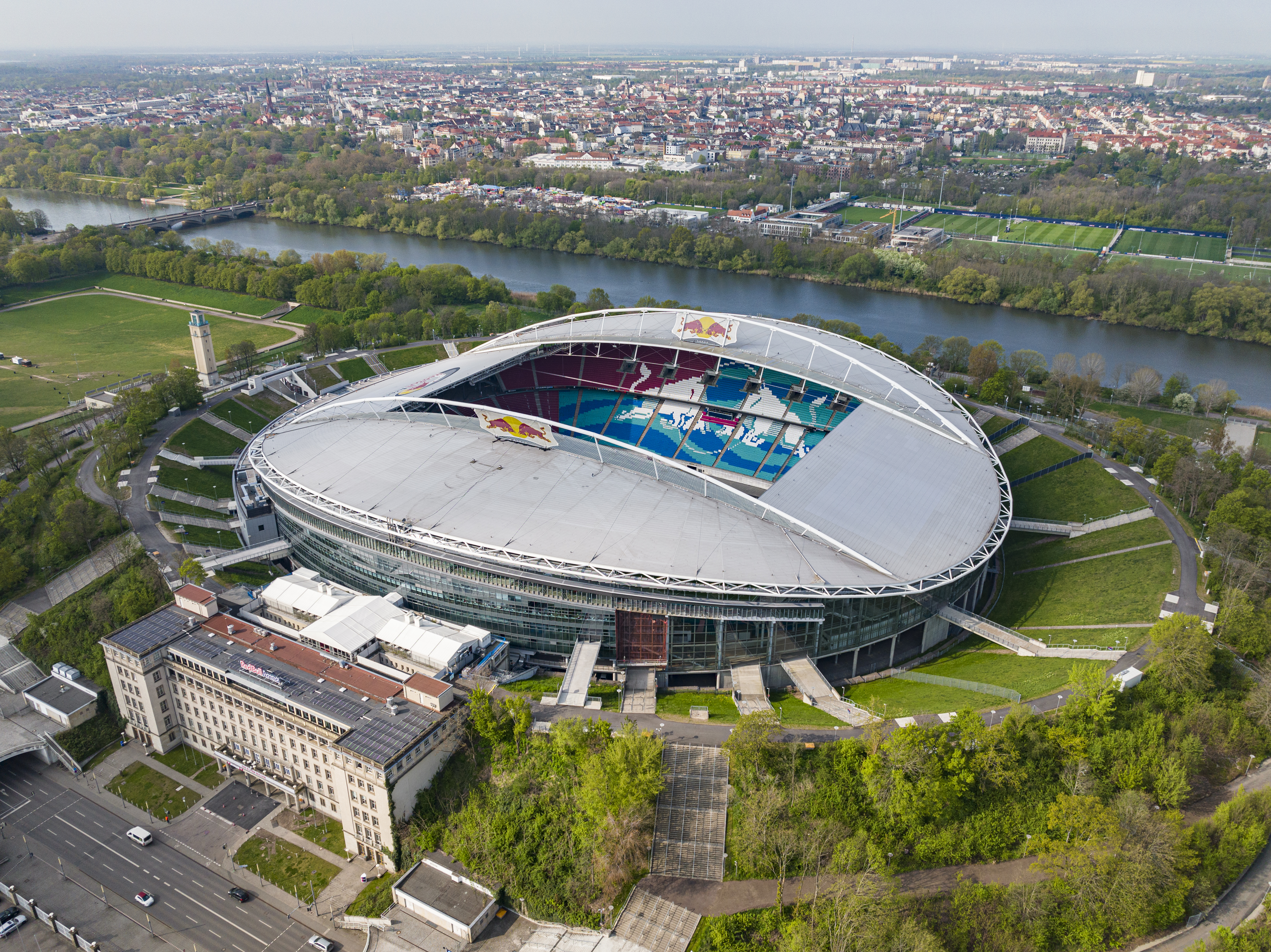
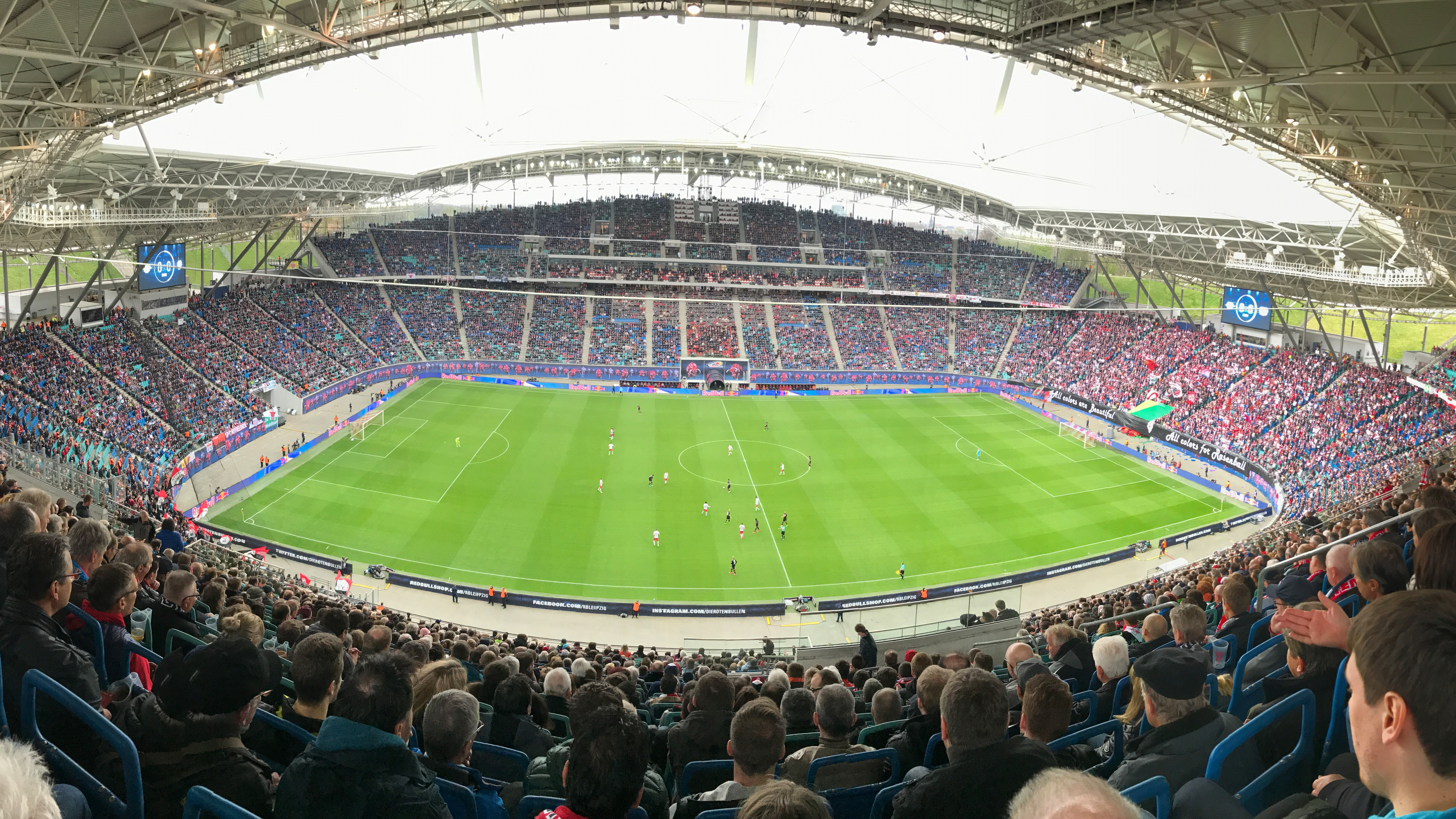
- UEFA
- Interactive map of Red Bull Arena
- Full name: Red Bull Arena
- Former names: Zentralstadion (2004–2010)
- Address: Am Sportforum 3 Leipzig, Saxony, Germany
- Owner: Red Bull Arena Besitzgesellschaft mbH
- Operator: RasenBallsport Leipzig GmbH
- Capacity: 47,800 (league matches); 45,228 (international matches)
- Surface: Grass
- Scoreboard: Yes
- Field size: 105 m × 68 m (115 yd × 74 yd)

Construction
- Built: 2000–2004
- Opened: 17 November 2004; 21 years ago
- Renovated: 2015
- Cost: €116 million

Tenants
- FC Sachsen Leipzig (2004–2009); RB Leipzig (2010–present); Germany national football team (selected matches)

Website
- rbleipzig.com

Red Bull Arena (German pronunciation: [ɹɛt ˈbʊl ʔaˌʁeːna]; formerly Zentralstadion German pronunciation: [tsɛnˈtʁaːlˌʃtaːdi̯ɔn]) is a football stadium located in Leipzig, Saxony, Germany, in the Zentrum-Nordwest locality. It is the largest football stadium in Eastern Germany, and has also hosted music concerts as well as football.

Opened in 2004, it is currently the home stadium for Bundesliga club RB Leipzig, with FC Sachsen Leipzig having previously used the stadium from its opening until 2009. Due to UEFA sponsorship regulations, the stadium is known as the RB Arena and Leipzig Arena for European matches.

== Background ==
In 1956, the first Zentralstadion opened, at the time it was one of the biggest stadiums in Europe being able to hold 100,000 spectators. Various Leipzig football teams used the venue as a home stadium, including VfB Leipzig (precursor to 1. FC Lokomotive Leipzig) at various points in the 20th century (including large-scale European matches in the 1970s and domestic football in the 1990s). However, in the 1990s, it fell into disuse and was costing the city too much to maintain. In 1997, the city of Leipzig decided to build a new stadium within the old stadium, a modern state of the art stadium only for football. Construction of the new stadium took place from December 2000 to March 2004. A similar endeavour of constructing a new stadium within the confines of an historic stadium's exterior was completed in Chicago's Soldier Field, which similarly built a modern stadium while preserving the exterior of the original structure.

== History ==
The Zentralstadion was the only stadium in former East Germany to host games in the 2006 FIFA World Cup. It hosted four group matches and a round of 16 game in the tournament. A year earlier, it was also one of the venues for the 2005 FIFA Confederations Cup and hosted three matches of the tournament, including the third-place match. From 2005 to 2007, the Zentralstadion was host of the German League Cup final.

FC Sachsen Leipzig used the stadium as a home ground from time to time between 2004 and 2007, however they moved back to their traditional home, the Alfred-Kunze-Sportpark at the start of the 2008–09 season.

In July 2009, energy drink manufacturer Red Bull took over the license of SSV Markranstädt and renamed the team RasenBallsport Leipzig, in short RB Leipzig. From the outset, the new team outlined their wish to move into the tenant-less Zentralstadion and rename it the "Red Bull Arena". The naming rights were granted on 25 March 2010 and the stadium will be named so for a minimum period of 10 years as of 1 July 2010. The cost for renting the stadium will rise in accordance with the level of football RasenBallsport Leipzig are at. The team has pledged to upgrade the seating, install video advertising boards and make changes to the boxes and the VIP area.

In the 2010–11 season, Hallescher FC played between three and five games at the Zentralstadion due to their own Kurt-Wabbel Stadion being renovated.

In 2014, the stadium was ranked 17th in the country based on attendance, safety, and number of events.

On 27 May 2026, it hosted the 2026 UEFA Conference League final between English club Crystal Palace and Spanish club Rayo Vallecano.

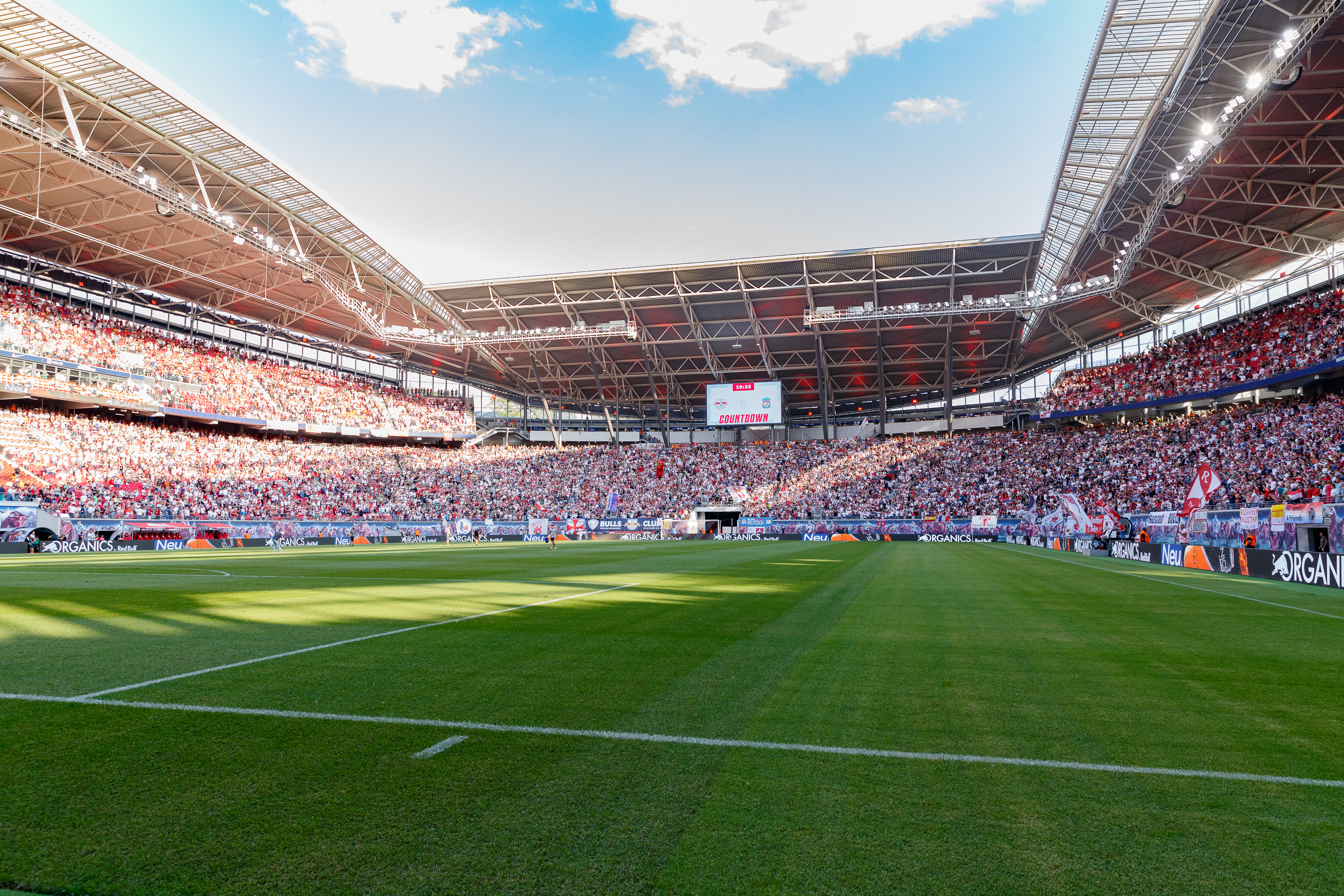
RB Leipzig fans at the Red Bull Arena

=== Future expansion ===
In October 2015, expansion of the Red Bull Arena was back on the agenda. New plans were made to expand the stadium to 57,000 seats, involving Viennese architect Albert Wimmer. Reconstruction could start in the summer break of 2016. In January 2016, the club decided to put the plans on hold, at least until 2017.

In December 2016, RB Leipzig proposed that the stadium would be sold from former owner Michael Kölmel to the club to continue the plans from the 2015 agenda. Due to the move of the arena into ownership of Red Bull, a new stadium was deemed infeasible. The Stadium will expand to a total of 53,840 Seats as of Summer 2021, beginning from November 2018, when construction works will start.

== Facilities ==
Red Bull Arena with Festwiese

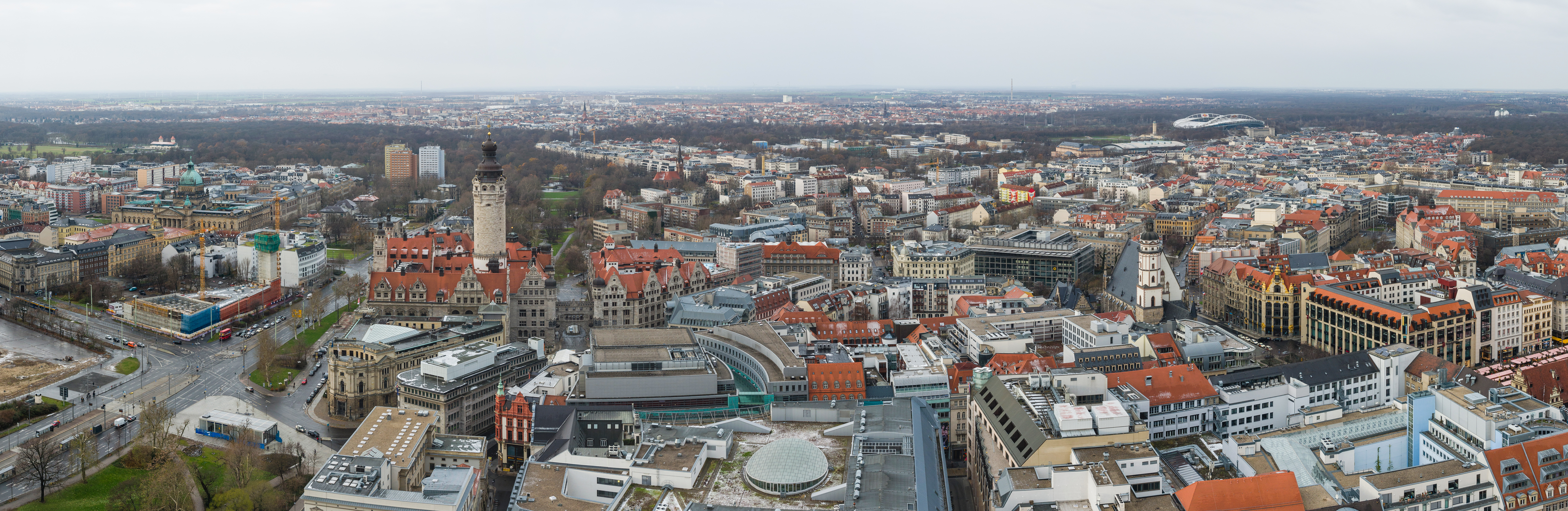
Leipzig city centre with Red Bull Arena to the right

There are bridges built over the old stadium to connect with the new stadium. The roof has an integrated floodlight design and is designed to provide superior acoustics. The grass area is 120 x 80 m, the actual pitch is 105 x 68 m. It has been integrated into the area surrounding the stadium by large numbers of trees and other greenery.

== External dimensions ==
- North to South: 230 m
- East to West: 210 m
- Height to Roof: 46.5 m
- Roof Area: 28,100 m^{2}
- Map Coordinates: 51° 20' 44" N; 12° 20' 54" E

== 2006 FIFA World Cup ==
The stadium was one of the venues for the 2006 FIFA World Cup, the only one located in former East Germany. The following games were played at the stadium during the 2006 World Cup:

Date	Time (CEST)	Team #1	Result	Team #2	Round	Attendance
11 June 2006	15:00	Serbia and Montenegro	0–1	Netherlands	Group C	43,000
14 June 2006	15:00	Spain	4–0	Ukraine	Group H	43,000
18 June 2006	21:00	South Korea	1–1	France	Group G	43,000
21 June 2006	16:00	Iran	1–1	Angola	Group D	38,000
24 June 2006	21:00	Argentina	2–1 (a.e.t.)	Mexico	Round of 16	43,000

== UEFA Euro 2024 ==
The stadium was one of the venues for the UEFA Euro 2024, the only one located in former East Germany. The following games were played at the stadium during the tournament:

Date	Time (CEST)	Team #1	Result	Team #2	Round	Spectators
18 June 2024	21:00	Portugal	2–1	Czech Republic	Group F	38,421
21 June 2024	21:00	Netherlands	0–0	France	Group D	38,531
24 June 2024	21:00	Croatia	1–1	Italy	Group B	38,322
2 July 2024	21:00	Austria	1–2	Turkey	Round of 16	38,305

== Other uses ==
The arena is frequently used as a concert venue. Tina Turner (2000), Paul McCartney (2004), Herbert Grönemeyer (2007, 2011), Genesis (2007), Bon Jovi (2008), Depeche Mode (2009, 2013), AC/DC (2009, 2016), Mario Barth (2011), Coldplay (2012, 2017), Bruce Springsteen & The E Street Band (2013), Helene Fischer (2015, 2018), Rammstein (2022), P!nk (2024) and Robbie Williams (2025) have all played at this venue.

== See also ==
- List of football stadiums in Germany
- Lists of stadiums
