= UEFA Euro 2024 Group D =

Football tournament group stage

Group D of UEFA Euro 2024 took place from 16 to 25 June 2024. The group contained Poland, the Netherlands, Austria and France.

== Teams ==
| Draw position | Team | Pot | Method of qualification | Date of qualification | Finals appearance | Last appearance | Previous best performance | Qualifying Rankings November 2023 (Note: The European Qualifiers overall rankings from November 2023 were used for seeding for the final draw.) | FIFA Rankings April 2024 |
|---|---|---|---|---|---|---|---|---|---|
| D1 | Poland | 4 | Play-off winner A | 26 March 2024 | 5th | 2020 | Quarter-finals (2016) | 26 | 28 |
| D2 | Netherlands | 3 | Group B runner-up | 18 November 2023 | 11th | 2020 | Winners (1988) | 12 | 7 |
| D3 | Austria | 2 | Group F runner-up | 16 October 2023 | 4th | 2020 | Round of 16 (2020) | 11 | 25 |
| D4 | France | 1 | Group B winner | 13 October 2023 | 11th | 2020 | Winners (1984, 2000) | 2 | 2 |

== Standings ==
| Pos | Team | Pld | W | D | L | GF | GA | GD | Pts | Qualification |
|---|---|---|---|---|---|---|---|---|---|---|
| 1 | Austria | 3 | 2 | 0 | 1 | 6 | 4 | +2 | 6 | Advance to knockout stage |
| 2 | France | 3 | 1 | 2 | 0 | 2 | 1 | +1 | 5 | Advance to knockout stage |
| 3 | Netherlands | 3 | 1 | 1 | 1 | 4 | 4 | 0 | 4 | Advance to knockout stage |
| 4 | Poland | 3 | 0 | 1 | 2 | 3 | 6 | −3 | 1 | |

Source: UEFA
Rules for classification: Group stage tiebreakers

In the round of 16,

- The winner of Group D, Austria, advanced to play the runner-up of Group F, Turkey.
- The runner-up of Group D, France, advanced to play the runner-up of Group E, Belgium.
- The third-placed team of Group D, the Netherlands, advanced to play the winner of Group E, Romania.

== Matches ==
=== Poland vs Netherlands ===
16 June 2024
15:00

| Poland | 1–2 | Netherlands |
|---|---|---|
| Buksa 16' | Report | Gakpo 29'; Weghorst 83' |

Volksparkstadion, Hamburg
Attendance: 48,117
Referee: Artur Soares Dias (Portugal)

| Poland | Netherlands |

| GK | 1 | Wojciech Szczęsny |
| CB | 5 | Jan Bednarek |
| CB | 2 | Bartosz Salamon | (substituted off) 86' |
| CB | 14 | Jakub Kiwior |
| RM | 19 | Przemysław Frankowski |
| CM | 10 | Piotr Zieliński (c) | (substituted off) 78' |
| CM | 13 | Taras Romanczuk | (substituted off) 55' |
| LM | 21 | Nicola Zalewski |
| AM | 26 | Kacper Urbański | (substituted off) 55' |
| AM | 20 | Sebastian Szymański | (substituted off) 46' |
| CF | 16 | Adam Buksa |
Substitutions:
| MF | 8 | Jakub Moder | (substituted on) 46' |
| FW | 7 | Karol Świderski | (substituted on) 55' |
| MF | 24 | Bartosz Slisz | (substituted on) 55' |
| MF | 6 | Jakub Piotrowski | (substituted on) 78' |
| DF | 18 | Bartosz Bereszyński | (substituted on) 86' |
Manager:
Michał Probierz

| GK | 1 | Bart Verbruggen |
| RB | 22 | Denzel Dumfries |
| CB | 6 | Stefan de Vrij |
| CB | 4 | Virgil van Dijk (c) |
| LB | 5 | Nathan Aké | | (substituted off) 87' |
| CM | 16 | Joey Veerman | (yellow card) 15' | (substituted off) 62' |
| CM | 14 | Tijjani Reijnders |
| CM | 24 | Jerdy Schouten |
| RF | 7 | Xavi Simons | | (substituted off) 62' |
| CF | 10 | Memphis Depay | | (substituted off) 81' |
| LF | 11 | Cody Gakpo | | (substituted off) 81' |
Substitutions:
| MF | 8 | Georginio Wijnaldum | | (substituted on) 62' |
| FW | 18 | Donyell Malen | | (substituted on) 62' |
| DF | 12 | Jeremie Frimpong | | (substituted on) 81' |
| FW | 9 | Wout Weghorst | | (substituted on) 81' |
| DF | 15 | Micky van de Ven | | (substituted on) 87' |
Manager:
Ronald Koeman

Man of the Match:
Cody Gakpo (Netherlands)

Assistant referees:
Paulo Soares (Portugal)
Pedro Ribeiro (Portugal)
Fourth official:
Irfan Peljto (Bosnia and Herzegovina)
Reserve assistant referee:
Senad Ibrišimbegović (Bosnia and Herzegovina)
Video assistant referee:
Tiago Martins (Portugal)
Assistant video assistant referees:
Christian Dingert (Germany)
Marco Fritz (Germany)

=== Austria vs France ===
17 June 2024
21:00

| Austria | 0–1 | France |
|---|---|---|
| | Report | Wöber 38' (o.g.) |

Merkur Spiel-Arena, Düsseldorf
Attendance: 46,425
Referee: Jesús Gil Manzano (Spain)

| Austria | France |

| GK | 13 | Patrick Pentz |
| RB | 5 | Stefan Posch |
| CB | 4 | Kevin Danso | (yellow card) 90+3' |
| CB | 2 | Maximilian Wöber | (yellow card) 16' | (substituted off) 59' |
| LB | 16 | Phillipp Mwene | (yellow card) 34' | (substituted off) 88' |
| CM | 6 | Nicolas Seiwald |
| CM | 10 | Florian Grillitsch | | (substituted off) 60' |
| RW | 20 | Konrad Laimer | (yellow card) 84' | (substituted off) 90+1' |
| AM | 19 | Christoph Baumgartner | (yellow card) 79' |
| LW | 9 | Marcel Sabitzer (c) |
| CF | 11 | Michael Gregoritsch | | (substituted off) 59' |
Substitutions:
| DF | 3 | Gernot Trauner | | (substituted on) 59' |
| FW | 7 | Marko Arnautović | | (substituted on) 59' |
| DF | 23 | Patrick Wimmer | | (substituted on) 60' |
| MF | 8 | Alexander Prass | | (substituted on) 88' |
| MF | 18 | Romano Schmid | | (substituted on) 90+1' |
Manager:
(Germany) Ralf Rangnick

| GK | 16 | Mike Maignan |
| RB | 5 | Jules Koundé |
| CB | 4 | Dayot Upamecano |
| CB | 17 | William Saliba |
| LB | 22 | Théo Hernandez |
| CM | 13 | N'Golo Kanté |
| CM | 14 | Adrien Rabiot | | (substituted off) 71' |
| RW | 11 | Ousmane Dembélé | (yellow card) 56' | (substituted off) 71' |
| AM | 7 | Antoine Griezmann | | (substituted off) 90' |
| LW | 10 | Kylian Mbappé (c) | (yellow card) 90' | (substituted off) 90' |
| CF | 15 | Marcus Thuram |
Substitutions:
| FW | 12 | Randal Kolo Muani | | (substituted on) 71' |
| MF | 6 | Eduardo Camavinga | | (substituted on) 71' |
| MF | 19 | Youssouf Fofana | | (substituted on) 90' |
| FW | 9 | Olivier Giroud | | (substituted on) 90' |
Manager:
Didier Deschamps

Man of the Match:
N'Golo Kanté (France)

Assistant referees:
Diego Barbero Sevilla (Spain)
Ángel Nevado Rodríguez (Spain)
Fourth official:
Mykola Balakin (Ukraine)
Reserve assistant referee:
Oleksandr Berkut (Ukraine)
Video assistant referee:
Juan Martínez Munuera (Spain)
Assistant video assistant referees:
Alejandro Hernández Hernández (Spain)
Tiago Martins (Portugal)

=== Poland vs Austria ===
21 June 2024
18:00

| Poland | 1–3 | Austria |
|---|---|---|
| Piątek 30' | Report | Trauner 9'; Baumgartner 66'; Arnautović 78' (pen.) |

Olympiastadion, Berlin
Attendance: 69,455
Referee: Halil Umut Meler (Turkey)

| Poland | Austria |

| GK | 1 | Wojciech Szczęsny | (yellow card) 77' |
| CB | 5 | Jan Bednarek |
| CB | 3 | Paweł Dawidowicz |
| CB | 14 | Jakub Kiwior |
| RM | 19 | Przemysław Frankowski |
| CM | 6 | Jakub Piotrowski | | (substituted off) 46' |
| CM | 24 | Bartosz Slisz | (yellow card) 53' | (substituted off) 75' |
| LM | 21 | Nicola Zalewski |
| AM | 10 | Piotr Zieliński (c) | | (substituted off) 87' |
| CF | 16 | Adam Buksa | | (substituted off) 60' |
| CF | 23 | Krzysztof Piątek | | (substituted off) 60' |
Substitutions:
| MF | 8 | Jakub Moder | (yellow card) 62' | (substituted on) 46' |
| FW | 9 | Robert Lewandowski | (yellow card) 64' | (substituted on) 60' |
| FW | 7 | Karol Świderski | | (substituted on) 60' |
| MF | 11 | Kamil Grosicki | | (substituted on) 75' |
| MF | 26 | Kacper Urbański | | (substituted on) 87' |
Manager:
Michał Probierz

| GK | 13 | Patrick Pentz |
| RB | 5 | Stefan Posch |
| CB | 3 | Gernot Trauner | | (substituted off) 59' |
| CB | 15 | Philipp Lienhart |
| LB | 16 | Phillipp Mwene | | (substituted off) 63' |
| CM | 6 | Nicolas Seiwald |
| CM | 10 | Florian Grillitsch | | (substituted off) 46' |
| RW | 19 | Christoph Baumgartner | | (substituted off) 81' |
| AM | 20 | Konrad Laimer |
| LW | 9 | Marcel Sabitzer |
| CF | 7 | Marko Arnautović (c) | (yellow card) 70' | (substituted off) 81' |
Substitutions:
| FW | 23 | Patrick Wimmer | (yellow card) 56' | (substituted on) 46' |
| DF | 4 | Kevin Danso | | (substituted on) 59' |
| MF | 8 | Alexander Prass | | (substituted on) 63' |
| MF | 18 | Romano Schmid | | (substituted on) 81' |
| FW | 11 | Michael Gregoritsch | | (substituted on) 81' |
Manager:
(Germany) Ralf Rangnick

Man of the Match:
Christoph Baumgartner (Austria)

Assistant referees:
Mustafa Emre Eyisoy (Turkey)
Kerem Ersoy (Turkey)
Fourth official:
Rade Obrenović (Slovenia)
Reserve assistant referee:
Jure Praprotnik (Slovenia)
Video assistant referee:
Paolo Valeri (Italy)
Assistant video assistant referees:
Alper Ulusoy (Turkey)
Massimiliano Irrati (Italy)

=== Netherlands vs France ===
The two sides had previously met in the UEFA Euro 2008 group stage, won 4-1 by the Netherlands.

21 June 2024
21:00

| Netherlands | 0–0 | France |
|---|---|---|
| | Report |

Red Bull Arena, Leipzig
Attendance: 38,531
Referee: Anthony Taylor (England)

| Netherlands | France |

| GK | 1 | Bart Verbruggen |
| RB | 22 | Denzel Dumfries |
| CB | 6 | Stefan de Vrij |
| CB | 4 | Virgil van Dijk (c) |
| LB | 5 | Nathan Aké |
| CM | 7 | Xavi Simons | | (substituted off) 73' |
| CM | 14 | Tijjani Reijnders |
| CM | 24 | Jerdy Schouten | (yellow card) 31' | (substituted off) 73' |
| RF | 12 | Jeremie Frimpong | | (substituted off) 73' |
| CF | 10 | Memphis Depay | | (substituted off) 79' |
| LF | 11 | Cody Gakpo |
Substitutions:
| MF | 8 | Georginio Wijnaldum | | (substituted on) 73' |
| MF | 16 | Joey Veerman | | (substituted on) 73' |
| DF | 2 | Lutsharel Geertruida | | (substituted on) 73' |
| FW | 9 | Wout Weghorst | | (substituted on) 79' |
Manager:
Ronald Koeman

| GK | 16 | Mike Maignan |
| RB | 5 | Jules Koundé |
| CB | 4 | Dayot Upamecano |
| CB | 17 | William Saliba |
| LB | 22 | Théo Hernandez |
| CM | 8 | Aurélien Tchouaméni |
| CM | 13 | N'Golo Kanté |
| CM | 14 | Adrien Rabiot |
| RF | 11 | Ousmane Dembélé | (substituted off) 75' |
| CF | 15 | Marcus Thuram | (substituted off) 75' |
| LF | 7 | Antoine Griezmann (c) |
Substitutions:
| FW | 20 | Kingsley Coman | (substituted on) 75' |
| FW | 9 | Olivier Giroud | (substituted on) 75' |
Manager:
Didier Deschamps

Man of the Match:
N'Golo Kanté (France)

Assistant referees:
Gary Beswick (England)
Adam Nunn (England)
Fourth official:
Glenn Nyberg (Sweden)
Reserve assistant referee:
Mahbod Beigi (Sweden)
Video assistant referee:
Stuart Attwell (England)
Assistant video assistant referees:
Fedayi San (Switzerland)
Marco Fritz (Germany)

=== Netherlands vs Austria ===
25 June 2024
18:00

| Netherlands | 2–3 | Austria |
|---|---|---|
| Gakpo 47'; Depay 75' | Report | Malen 6' (o.g.); Schmid 59'; Sabitzer 80' |

Olympiastadion, Berlin
Attendance: 68,363
Referee: Ivan Kružliak (Slovakia)

| Netherlands | Austria |

| GK | 1 | Bart Verbruggen |
| RB | 2 | Lutsharel Geertruida |
| CB | 6 | Stefan de Vrij |
| CB | 4 | Virgil van Dijk (c) |
| LB | 5 | Nathan Aké | (substituted off) 65' |
| CM | 16 | Joey Veerman | (substituted off) 35' |
| CM | 14 | Tijjani Reijnders | (substituted off) 65' |
| CM | 24 | Jerdy Schouten |
| RF | 18 | Donyell Malen | (substituted off) 72' |
| CF | 10 | Memphis Depay |
| LF | 11 | Cody Gakpo |
Substitutions:
| MF | 7 | Xavi Simons | (substituted on) 35' |
| DF | 15 | Micky van de Ven | (substituted on) 65' |
| MF | 8 | Georginio Wijnaldum | (substituted on) 65' |
| FW | 9 | Wout Weghorst | (substituted on) 72' |
Manager:
Ronald Koeman

| GK | 13 | Patrick Pentz |
| RB | 5 | Stefan Posch | (yellow card) 32' |
| CB | 2 | Maximilian Wöber |
| CB | 15 | Philipp Lienhart | | (substituted off) 62' |
| LB | 8 | Alexander Prass |
| CM | 6 | Nicolas Seiwald |
| CM | 10 | Florian Grillitsch | | (substituted off) 62' |
| RW | 23 | Patrick Wimmer | (yellow card) 33' | (substituted off) 62' |
| AM | 9 | Marcel Sabitzer |
| LW | 18 | Romano Schmid | | (substituted off) 90+2' |
| CF | 7 | Marko Arnautović (c) | | (substituted off) 78' |
Substitutions:
| DF | 14 | Leopold Querfeld | (yellow card) 90+4' | (substituted on) 62' |
| MF | 19 | Christoph Baumgartner | | (substituted on) 62' |
| MF | 20 | Konrad Laimer | | (substituted on) 62' |
| FW | 11 | Michael Gregoritsch | | (substituted on) 78' |
| FW | 24 | Andreas Weimann | | (substituted on) 90+2' |
Manager:
(Germany) Ralf Rangnick

Man of the Match:
Marcel Sabitzer (Austria)

Assistant referees:
Branislav Hancko (Slovakia)
Jan Pozor (Slovakia)
Fourth official:
Irfan Peljto (Bosnia and Herzegovina)
Reserve assistant referee:
Senad Ibrišimbegović (Bosnia and Herzegovina)
Video assistant referee:
Marco Fritz (Germany)
Assistant video assistant referees:
Christian Dingert (Germany)
Nejc Kajtazovič (Slovenia)

=== France vs Poland ===
The two sides had previously met in the 2022 FIFA World Cup knockout stage, won 3-1 by France.

25 June 2024
18:00

| France | 1–1 | Poland |
|---|---|---|
| Mbappé 56' (pen.) | Report | Lewandowski 79' (pen.) |

Westfalenstadion, Dortmund
Attendance: 59,728
Referee: Marco Guida (Italy)

| France | Poland |

| GK | 16 | Mike Maignan |
| RB | 5 | Jules Koundé |
| CB | 4 | Dayot Upamecano |
| CB | 17 | William Saliba |
| LB | 22 | Théo Hernandez |
| DM | 8 | Aurélien Tchouaméni | | (substituted off) 81' |
| DM | 13 | N'Golo Kanté | | (substituted off) 61' |
| CM | 14 | Adrien Rabiot | (yellow card) 43' | (substituted off) 61' |
| RF | 11 | Ousmane Dembélé | | (substituted off) 86' |
| CF | 10 | Kylian Mbappé (c) |
| LF | 25 | Bradley Barcola | | (substituted off) 61' |
Substitutions:
| MF | 6 | Eduardo Camavinga | | (substituted on) 61' |
| FW | 9 | Olivier Giroud | | (substituted on) 61' |
| MF | 7 | Antoine Griezmann | | (substituted on) 61' |
| MF | 19 | Youssouf Fofana | | (substituted on) 81' |
| FW | 12 | Randal Kolo Muani | | (substituted on) 86' |
Manager:
Didier Deschamps

| GK | 12 | Łukasz Skorupski |
| CB | 5 | Jan Bednarek |
| CB | 3 | Paweł Dawidowicz | (yellow card) 89' |
| CB | 14 | Jakub Kiwior |
| RM | 19 | Przemysław Frankowski |
| CM | 8 | Jakub Moder |
| CM | 10 | Piotr Zieliński |
| LM | 21 | Nicola Zalewski | (yellow card) 24' | (substituted off) 68' |
| AM | 20 | Sebastian Szymański | | (substituted off) 68' |
| AM | 26 | Kacper Urbański |
| CF | 9 | Robert Lewandowski (c) |
Substitutions:
| MF | 25 | Michał Skóraś | | (substituted on) 68' |
| FW | 7 | Karol Świderski | (yellow card) 90+2' | (substituted on) 68' |
Manager:
| Michał Probierz | | | (yellow card) 53' |

Man of the Match:
Łukasz Skorupski (Poland)

Assistant referees:
Filippo Meli (Italy)
Giorgio Peretti (Italy)
Fourth official:
Rade Obrenović (Slovenia)
Reserve assistant referee:
Jure Praprotnik (Slovenia)
Video assistant referee:
Massimiliano Irrati (Italy)
Assistant video assistant referees:
Cătălin Popa (Romania)
Tiago Martins (Portugal)

== Discipline ==
Fair play points would have been used as a tiebreaker if the head-to-head and overall records of teams had been tied (and if a penalty shoot-out was not applicable as a tiebreaker). These were calculated based on yellow and red cards received by players and team officials in all group matches as follows:

- yellow card = 1 point
- red card as a result of two yellow cards = 3 points
- direct red card = 3 points
- yellow card followed by direct red card = 4 points

Only one of the above deductions was applied to a player or team official in a single match.

| Team | Match 1 | | | | Match 2 | | | | Match 3 | | | | Points |
| Team | Booked | (yellow card) (yellow-red card) | Sent off (straight red) | (yellow card) (red card) | Booked | (yellow card) (yellow-red card) | Sent off (straight red) | (yellow card) (red card) | Booked | (yellow card) (yellow-red card) | Sent off (straight red) | (yellow card) (red card) | Points |
|---|---|---|---|---|---|---|---|---|---|---|---|---|---|
| Netherlands | 1 | | | | 1 | | | | | | | | −2 |
| France | 2 | | | | | | | | 1 | | | | −3 |
| Poland | | | | | 4 | | | | 4 | | | | –8 |
| Austria | 5 | | | | 2 | | | | 3 | | | | −10 |

== See also ==
- Austria at the UEFA European Championship
- France at the UEFA European Championship
- Netherlands at the UEFA European Championship
- Poland at the UEFA European Championship
