= Romano Schmid =

Austrian footballer (born 2000)

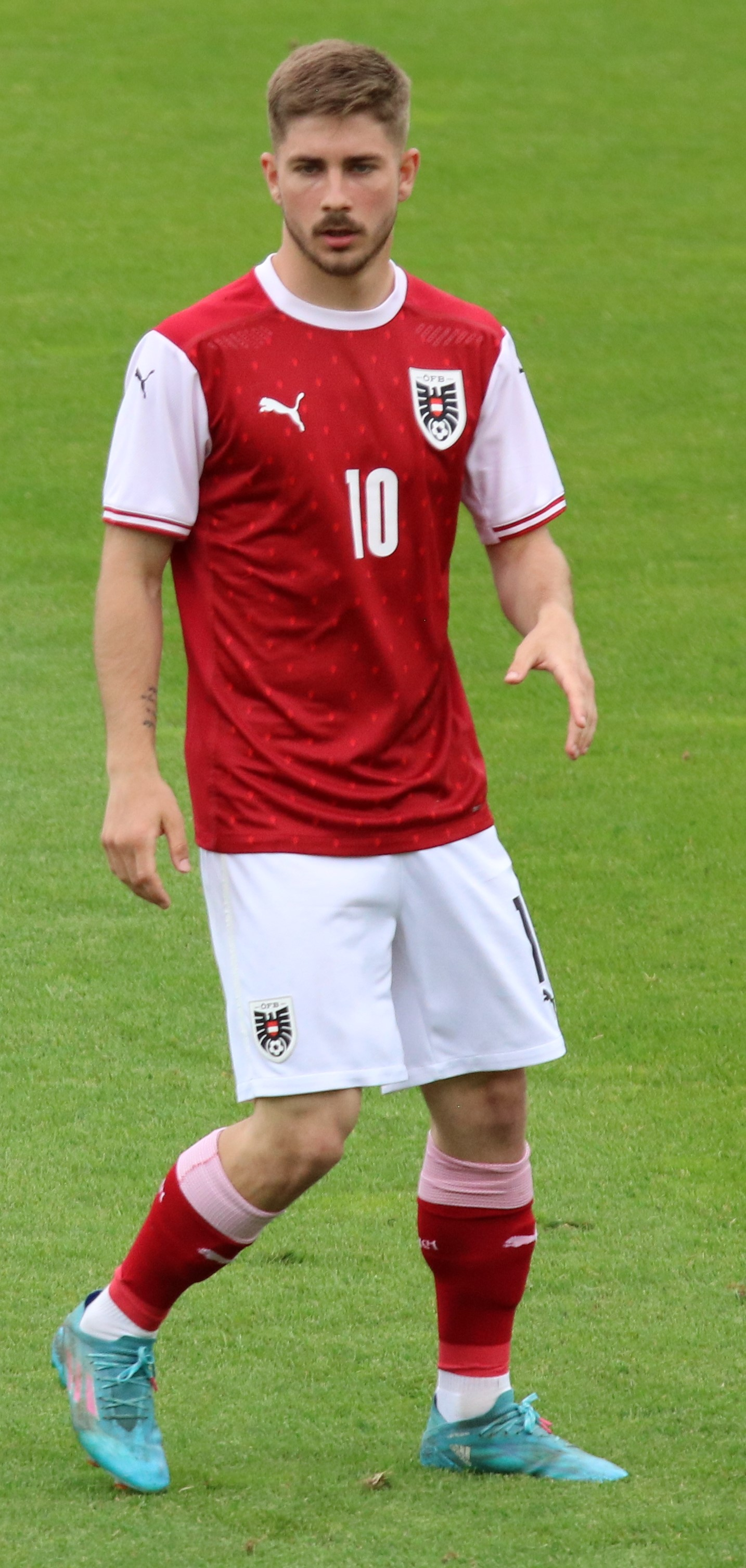
- Schmid with Austria in 2022

Personal information
- Full name: Romano Christian Schmid
- Date of birth: 27 January 2000 (age 26)
- Place of birth: Graz, Austria
- Height: 1.68 m (5 ft 6 in)
- Position: Attacking midfielder

Team information
- Current team: Frosinone
- Number: 10

Youth career
- –2005: Union SV Vasoldsberg
- 2005–2009: Sturm Graz

Senior career*
Years	Team	Apps	(Gls)
2017	Sturm Graz	3	(1)
2017–2019	Red Bull Salzburg	1	(0)
2017–2018	→ FC Liefering	30	(9)
2019–2026	Werder Bremen	181	(17)
2019–2020	→ Wolfsberger AC (loan)	37	(3)
2026–	Frosinone	8	(2)

International career^{‡}
2014–2015	Austria U15	6	(1)
2015	Austria U16	4	(1)
2016–2017	Austria U17	17	(8)
2017	Austria U18	1	(0)
2017–2019	Austria U19	11	(4)
2019–	Austria U21	5	(0)
2022–	Austria	43	(5)
- * Club domestic league appearances and goals as of 15:42, 26 October 2026 (UTC) ‡ National team caps and goals as of 23:05, 14 November 2026 (UTC)

Romano Christian Schmid (born 27 January 2000) is an Austrian professional footballer who plays as an attacking midfielder for Serie A club Frosinone and the Austria national team.

== Club career ==
In January 2019, Schmid joined Bundesliga side Werder Bremen. The same year on 5 February, he was sent on loan to Wolfsberger AC for the rest of the season. In April 2022, he agreed a contract extension with Werder Bremen.

On 12 August 2026, Schmid signed a four-year contract with Frosinone in Italy.

== International career ==
On 22 September 2022, Schmid debuted for the Austrian senior squad in a 2–0 loss against France at the 2022–23 UEFA Nations League.

On 7 June 2024, he was selected in the 26-man squad for the UEFA Euro 2024. On 25 June, he scored his first international goal in a 3–2 victory over the Netherlands during the final group stage match of the European competition, helping his country secure the top spot in their group.

On 18 May 2026, Schmid was selected in Ralf Rangnick’s 26-man squad for the 2026 FIFA World Cup, marking Austria’s first appearance in the tournament since 1998.

== Career statistics ==
=== Club ===
As of match played 25 October 2026

Appearances and goals by club, season and competition
Club	Season	League			Cup		Europe		Total		Ref.
Club	Season	Division	Apps	Goals	Apps	Goals	Apps	Goals	Apps	Goals	Ref.
Sturm Graz	2016–17	Austrian Bundesliga	1	0	0	0	–		1	0	
Sturm Graz	2017–18	Austrian Bundesliga	2	1	1	0	–		3	1	
Sturm Graz	Total		3	1	1	0	0	0	4	1	—
FC Liefering	2017–18	Austrian First League	24	8	0	0	–		24	8	
FC Liefering	2018–19	Austrian Second League	6	1	0	0	–		6	1	
FC Liefering	Total		30	9	0	0	0	0	30	9	—
Red Bull Salzburg	2017–18	Austrian Bundesliga	1	0	0	0	–		1	0	
Werder Bremen	2020–21	Bundesliga	22	0	3	0	—		25	0	
Werder Bremen	2021–22	2. Bundesliga	33	3	1	0	—		34	3	
Werder Bremen	2022–23	Bundesliga	27	1	2	1	—		29	2	
Werder Bremen	2023–24	Bundesliga	33	4	1	0	—		34	4	
Werder Bremen	2024–25	Bundesliga	32	5	3	0	—		35	5	
Werder Bremen	2025–26	Bundesliga	34	4	1	0	—		35	5	
Werder Bremen	Total		181	17	11	1	0	0	192	18	—
Wolfsberger AC (loan)	2018–19	Austrian Bundesliga	12	1	0	0	—		12	1	
Wolfsberger AC (loan)	2019–20	Austrian Bundesliga	25	2	2	1	6	0	33	3	
Wolfsberger AC (loan)	Total		37	3	2	1	6	0	45	4	—
Frosinone	2026–27	Serie A	8	2	1	0	—		9	2	
Career total			260	32	15	2	6	0	281	34	—

=== International ===
As of match played 14 November 2026

Appearances and goals by national team and year
National team	Year	Apps	Goals
Austria	2022	3	0
Austria	2023	4	0
Austria	2024	14	2
Austria	2025	10	1
Austria	2026	12	2
Total		43	5

Scores and results list Austria's goal tally first, score column indicates score after each Schmid goal.

List of international goals scored by Romano Schmid
No.	Date	Venue	Opponent	Score	Result	Competition
1	25 June 2024	Olympiastadion, Berlin, Germany	Netherlands	2–1	3–2	UEFA Euro 2024
2	17 November 2024	Ernst-Happel-Stadion, Vienna, Austria	Slovenia	1–0	1–1	2024–25 UEFA Nations League B
3	9 October 2025	Ernst-Happel-Stadion, Vienna, Austria	San Marino	1–0	10–0	2026 FIFA World Cup qualification
4	16 June 2026	Levi's Stadium, Santa Clara, United States	Jordan	1–0	3–1	2026 FIFA World Cup
5	24 September 2026	Raiffeisen Arena, Linz, Austria	Israel	1–0	3–1	2026–27 UEFA Nations League B
