= Slovenia at the UEFA European Championship =

International football delegation

The Slovenia national football team have appeared at the UEFA European Championship twice, in 2000 and 2024.

During the 2000 qualifiers, Slovenia finished second in their group, behind Norway but ahead of Greece, Latvia, Albania and Georgia. In the play-offs, they defeated Ukraine 3–2 on aggregate to qualify for their first major tournament. At the finals, held in Belgium and the Netherlands, Slovenia were drawn into Group C together with Spain, Yugoslavia and Norway. In their inaugural match, Slovenia were leading 3–0 against Yugoslavia, but the match ended in a 3–3 draw. In the second match, Slovenia narrowly lost to Spain. Their last game against Norway ended in a goalless draw, leaving Slovenia bottom of their group with two points. Zlatko Zahovič was one of the country's key players, scoring three of the team's four goals in the tournament.

Slovenia would not qualify for the tournament again for another 24 years, until finally doing so in 2024; during the qualifiers, they finished second in their group, behind Denmark but ahead of Finland, Kazakhstan, Northern Ireland and San Marino. At the final tournament, Slovenia advanced to the knockout stage after drawing all three matches in their group, before being eliminated in the last 16 on penalties by Portugal.

== Overall record ==
| UEFA European Championship record | | | | | | | | | Qualification record | | | | | | |
| Year | Round | Pld | W | D | L | GF | GA | Squad | Pos. | Pld | W | D | L | GF | GA |
|---|---|---|---|---|---|---|---|---|---|---|---|---|---|---|---|
| 1960 to 1992 | Part of Yugoslavia | | | | | | | | Part of Yugoslavia | | | | | | |
| (England) 1996 | Did not qualify | | | | | | | | 5th | 10 | 3 | 2 | 5 | 13 | 13 |
| (Belgium) (Netherlands) 2000 | Group stage | 3 | 0 | 2 | 1 | 4 | 5 | Squad | 2nd (PO) | 12 | 6 | 3 | 3 | 15 | 16 |
| (Portugal) 2004 | Did not qualify | | | | | | | | 2nd (PO) | 10 | 4 | 3 | 3 | 16 | 14 |
| (Austria) (Switzerland) 2008 | Did not qualify | | | | | | | | 6th | 12 | 3 | 2 | 7 | 9 | 16 |
| (Poland) (Ukraine) 2012 | Did not qualify | | | | | | | | 4th | 10 | 4 | 2 | 4 | 11 | 7 |
| (France) 2016 | Did not qualify | | | | | | | | 3rd (PO) | 12 | 5 | 2 | 5 | 19 | 14 |
| (Europe) 2020 | Did not qualify | | | | | | | | 4th | 10 | 4 | 2 | 4 | 16 | 11 |
| (Germany) 2024 | Round of 16 | 4 | 0 | 4 | 0 | 2 | 2 | Squad | 2nd | 10 | 7 | 1 | 2 | 20 | 9 |
| (England) (Republic of Ireland) (Scotland) (Wales) 2028 | To be determined | | | | | | | | To be determined | | | | | | |
| (Italy) (Turkey) 2032 | To be determined | | | | | | | | To be determined | | | | | | |
| Total | Round of 16 | 7 | 0 | 6 | 1 | 6 | 7 | — | 2/8 | 86 | 36 | 17 | 33 | 119 | 100 |

== Euro 2000 ==
=== Group stage ===
In their first major tournament match, Slovenia stunned FR Yugoslavia and took a 3–0 lead after one hour of play, with Zlatko Zahovič scoring twice and Miran Pavlin once. After Siniša Mihajlović's red card, it seemed that the team would win the first match, but then, despite being down to ten players, Yugoslavia made a comeback as they scored three goals in the span of six minutes. In the second game, Spain took the 1–0 lead quickly as Raúl scored in the fourth minute. Slovenia equalised after one hour of play as Zahovič scored his third goal of the tournament. Only one minute later, Spain took the lead again as Joseba Etxeberria scored the game-winning goal. Around 10,000 Slovenian fans gathered at the Amsterdam Arena, which was, at the time, the record for the number of Slovenian spectators at a football match outside Slovenia, until the record was broken 24 years later at Euro 2024. In the last round of the group stage, Slovenia played against Norway and still had a chance to advance to the quarter-finals. However, the match ended in a goalless draw and Slovenia won its second point of the tournament, but was still eliminated.

| Pos | Team | Pld | W | D | L | GF | GA | GD | Pts | Qualification |
|---|---|---|---|---|---|---|---|---|---|---|
| 1 | Spain | 3 | 2 | 0 | 1 | 6 | 5 | +1 | 6 | Advance to knockout stage |
| 2 | FR Yugoslavia | 3 | 1 | 1 | 1 | 7 | 7 | 0 | 4 (Note: Head-to-head result: Norway 0–1 FR Yugoslavia.) | Advance to knockout stage |
| 3 | Norway | 3 | 1 | 1 | 1 | 1 | 1 | 0 | 4 | |
| 4 | Slovenia | 3 | 0 | 2 | 1 | 4 | 5 | −1 | 2 | |

Source: UEFA
Rules for classification: Group stage tiebreakers
Notes:
13 June 2000
20:45

| FR Yugoslavia | 3–3 | Slovenia |
|---|---|---|
| Milošević 67', 73'; Drulović 70' | Report | Zahovič 23', 57'; Pavlin 52' |

Stade du Pays de Charleroi, Charleroi
Attendance: 18,500
Referee: Vítor Melo Pereira (Portugal)

18 June 2000
18:00

| Slovenia | 1–2 | Spain |
|---|---|---|
| Zahovič 59' | Report | Raúl 4'; Etxeberria 60' |

Amsterdam Arena, Amsterdam
Attendance: 51,300
Referee: Markus Merk (Germany)

21 June 2000
18:00

| Slovenia | 0–0 | Norway |
|---|---|---|
| | Report |

GelreDome, Arnhem
Attendance: 21,000
Referee: Graham Poll (England)

== Euro 2024 ==
=== Group stage ===
24 years after their first European Championship appearance, Slovenia qualified for Euro 2024 by finishing second in their qualifying group. Led by manager Matjaž Kek, who previously led the national team in its last major tournament appearance (2010 World Cup), Slovenia was drawn into a group with England, Denmark and Serbia. In the opening game against Denmark, Slovenia drew 1–1 after Erik Janža cancelled Christian Eriksen's first-half strike. In the second match, a repeat of the match from Euro 2000, Slovenia played Serbia and came close to its first-ever victory at the European Championship. Žan Karničnik opened the score after 69 minutes, but Luka Jović scored a 95th-minute equaliser as Serbia grabbed a last-gasp draw. The match at Allianz Arena was attended by a record 20,170 Slovenian fans, which is the largest number of Slovenian fans at any football match outside Slovenia. In the last match of the group stage, Slovenia and England contested a goalless draw. Despite finishing third in the group behind Denmark because of disciplinary points, Slovenia advanced to the knockout stages of a major tournament for the first time in history as one of the best third-place teams.

| Pos | Team | Pld | W | D | L | GF | GA | GD | Pts | Qualification |
|---|---|---|---|---|---|---|---|---|---|---|
| 1 | England | 3 | 1 | 2 | 0 | 2 | 1 | +1 | 5 | Advance to knockout stage |
| 2 | Denmark | 3 | 0 | 3 | 0 | 2 | 2 | 0 | 3 (Note: Tied on head-to-head result (Slovenia 1–1 Denmark), overall goal difference and overall goals scored. Disciplinary points: Denmark −6, Slovenia −7.) | Advance to knockout stage |
| 3 | Slovenia | 3 | 0 | 3 | 0 | 2 | 2 | 0 | 3 | Advance to knockout stage |
| 4 | Serbia | 3 | 0 | 2 | 1 | 1 | 2 | −1 | 2 | |

Source: UEFA
Notes:
16 June 2024
18:00

| Slovenia | 1–1 | Denmark |
|---|---|---|
| Janža 77' | Report | Eriksen 17' |

MHPArena, Stuttgart
Attendance: 54,000
Referee: Sandro Schärer (Switzerland)

20 June 2024
15:00

| Slovenia | 1–1 | Serbia |
|---|---|---|
| Karničnik 69' | Report | Jović 90+5' |

Allianz Arena, Munich
Attendance: 63,028
Referee: István Kovács (Romania)

25 June 2024
21:00

| England | 0–0 | Slovenia |
|---|---|---|
| | Report |

RheinEnergieStadion, Cologne
Attendance: 41,536
Referee: Clément Turpin (France)

=== Knockout stage ===
In the round of 16, Slovenia faced Portugal, the winner of Group F. The two sides previously met in a friendly match just three months before the European Championship, where Slovenia won 2–0. The match went to extra time after a goalless draw in the regular time. In the last seconds of the first-half in extra time, Slovenian captain Jan Oblak saved Cristiano Ronaldo's penalty kick and the match ended 0–0 after 120 minutes. However, in the penalty shoot-out, Portuguese goalkeeper Diogo Costa saved all three penalties as Portugal won 3–0 and advanced to the quarter-finals.

Round of 16

1 July 2024
21:00

| Portugal | 0–0 (a.e.t.) | Slovenia |
|---|---|---|
| | Report |
Penalties
| Ronaldo (penalty scored); Fernandes (penalty scored); B. Silva (penalty scored) | 3–0 | (penalty missed) Iličić; (penalty missed) Balkovec; (penalty missed) Verbič |

Waldstadion, Frankfurt
Attendance: 46,576
Referee: Daniele Orsato (Italy)

== Player records ==
=== Goalscorers ===
Four Slovenian players have scored at least one goal at the UEFA European Championship final tournament.

| Rank | Player | Goals | Years |
|---|---|---|---|
| 1 | Zlatko Zahovič | 3 | 2000 |
| 2 | Erik Janža | 1 | 2024 |
| 2 | Žan Karničnik | 1 | 2024 |
| 2 | Miran Pavlin | 1 | 2000 |

== See also ==
- Slovenia at the FIFA World Cup
