= UEFA Euro 2024 knockout stage =

Stage of the football championship competition

The knockout stage of UEFA Euro 2024 began on 29 June 2024 with the round of 16 and ended on 14 July 2024 with the final at Olympiastadion in Berlin, Germany.

All times listed are Central European Summer Time. (UTC+2)

== Format ==
In the knockout stage, if a match was level at the end of normal playing time, extra time was played (two periods of 15 minutes each). If still tied after extra time, the match was decided by a penalty shoot-out.

UEFA set out the following schedule for the round of 16:

- Match 1: Winner Group B vs 3rd Group A/D/E/F
- Match 2: Winner Group A vs Runner-up Group C
- Match 3: Winner Group F vs 3rd Group A/B/C
- Match 4: Runner-up Group D vs Runner-up Group E
- Match 5: Winner Group E vs 3rd Group A/B/C/D
- Match 6: Winner Group D vs Runner-up Group F
- Match 7: Winner Group C vs 3rd Group D/E/F
- Match 8: Runner-up Group A vs Runner-up Group B

As with every tournament since UEFA Euro 1984, there was no third place play-off.

=== Combinations of matches in the round of 16 ===
The specific match-ups involving the third-placed teams depended on which four third-placed teams from 15 possible combinations qualified for the round of 16:

Combination according to the four qualified teams

Third-placed teams qualify from groups						1B vs	1C vs	1E vs	1F vs
A	B	C	D			3A	3D	3B	3C
A	B	C		E		3A	3E	3B	3C
A	B	C			F	3A	3F	3B	3C
A	B		D	E		3D	3E	3A	3B
A	B		D		F	3D	3F	3A	3B
A	B			E	F	3E	3F	3B	3A
A		C	D	E		3E	3D	3C	3A
A		C	D		F	3F	3D	3C	3A
A		C		E	F	3E	3F	3C	3A
A			D	E	F	3E	3F	3D	3A
	B	C	D	E		3E	3D	3B	3C
	B	C	D		F	3F	3D	3C	3B
	B	C		E	F	3F	3E	3C	3B
	B		D	E	F	3F	3E	3D	3B
		C	D	E	F	3F	3E	3D	3C

== Qualified teams ==
The top two placed teams from each of the six groups, along with the four best-placed third teams, qualified for the knockout stage.

Group	Winners	Runners-up	Third-placed teams (Best four qualified)
A	Germany	Switzerland	—N/a
B	Spain	Italy	—N/a
C	England	Denmark	Slovenia
D	Austria	France	Netherlands
E	Romania	Belgium	Slovakia
F	Portugal	Turkey	Georgia

== Bracket ==
Round of 16
30 June – Cologne
Spain	4
Georgia	1
29 June – Dortmund
Germany	2
Denmark	0
1 July – Frankfurt
Portugal (p)	0 (3)
Slovenia	0 (0)
1 July – Düsseldorf
France	1
Belgium	0
2 July – Munich
Romania	0
Netherlands	3
2 July – Leipzig
Austria	1
Turkey	2
30 June – Gelsenkirchen
England (a.e.t.)	2
Slovakia	1
29 June – Berlin
Switzerland	2
Italy	0

Quarter-finals
5 July – Stuttgart
Spain (a.e.t.)	2
Germany	1
5 July – Hamburg
Portugal	0 (3)
France (p)	0 (5)
6 July – Berlin
Netherlands	2
Turkey	1
6 July – Düsseldorf
England (p)	1 (5)
Switzerland	1 (3)

Semi-finals
9 July – Munich
Spain	2
France	1
10 July – Dortmund
Netherlands	1
England	2

Final
14 July – Berlin
Spain	2
England	1

== Round of 16 ==
=== Switzerland vs Italy ===
29 June 2024
18:00

Switzerland	2–0	Italy
Freuler 37'; Vargas 46'	Report

Olympiastadion, Berlin
Attendance: 68,172
Referee: Szymon Marciniak (Poland)

Switzerland	Italy

GK	1	Yann Sommer
CB	22	Fabian Schär
CB	5	Manuel Akanji
CB	13	Ricardo Rodriguez
RM	20	Michel Aebischer	(substituted off) 90+2'
CM	8	Remo Freuler
CM	10	Granit Xhaka (c)
LM	26	Fabian Rieder	(substituted off) 71'
RF	17	Rubén Vargas	(substituted off) 71'
CF	7	Breel Embolo	(substituted off) 77'
LF	19	Dan Ndoye	(substituted off) 77'
Substitutions:
MF	14	Steven Zuber	(substituted on) 71'
DF	2	Leonidas Stergiou	(substituted on) 71'
MF	16	Vincent Sierro	(substituted on) 77'
FW	18	Kwadwo Duah	(substituted on) 77'
MF	11	Renato Steffen	(substituted on) 90+2'
Manager:
Murat Yakin

GK	1	Gianluigi Donnarumma (c)
RB	2	Giovanni Di Lorenzo
CB	17	Gianluca Mancini	(yellow card) 57'
CB	23	Alessandro Bastoni
LB	13	Matteo Darmian		(substituted off) 74'
CM	16	Bryan Cristante		(substituted off) 74'
CM	21	Nicolò Fagioli		(substituted off) 86'
CM	18	Nicolò Barella	(yellow card) 35'	(substituted off) 64'
RF	14	Federico Chiesa
CF	9	Gianluca Scamacca
LF	22	Stephan El Shaarawy	(yellow card) 45'	(substituted off) 46'
Substitutions:
FW	20	Mattia Zaccagni		(substituted on) 46'
FW	19	Mateo Retegui		(substituted on) 64'
DF	24	Andrea Cambiaso		(substituted on) 74'
MF	10	Lorenzo Pellegrini		(substituted on) 74'
MF	7	Davide Frattesi		(substituted on) 86'
Manager:
Luciano Spalletti

Man of the Match:
Rubén Vargas (Switzerland)

Assistant referees:
Tomasz Listkiewicz (Poland)
Adam Kupsik (Poland)
Fourth official:
Facundo Tello (Argentina)
Reserve assistant referee:
Gabriel Chade (Argentina)
Video assistant referee:
Tomasz Kwiatkowski (Poland)
Assistant video assistant referees:
Bartosz Frankowski (Poland)
Bastian Dankert (Germany)

=== Germany vs Denmark ===
This was a rematch of the UEFA Euro 1992 final, which Denmark won 2–0. Their most recent tournament meeting was in the UEFA Euro 2012 group stage, won 2-1 by Germany.

In the 35th minute, the match was suspended due to adverse weather conditions (thunderstorms and heavy rain) in the vicinity of the stadium. Play was suspended for about 25 minutes before resuming at 21:59.

29 June 2024
21:00

Germany	2–0	Denmark
Havertz 53' (pen.); Musiala 68'	Report

Westfalenstadion, Dortmund
Attendance: 61,612
Referee: Michael Oliver (England)

Germany	Denmark

GK	1	Manuel Neuer
RB	6	Joshua Kimmich
CB	2	Antonio Rüdiger
CB	15	Nico Schlotterbeck
LB	3	David Raum		(substituted off) 81'
CM	23	Robert Andrich		(substituted off) 64'
CM	8	Toni Kroos
RW	19	Leroy Sané		(substituted off) 88'
AM	21	İlkay Gündoğan (c)		(substituted off) 64'
LW	10	Jamal Musiala		(substituted off) 81'
CF	7	Kai Havertz
Substitutions:
MF	25	Emre Can		(substituted on) 64'
FW	9	Niclas Füllkrug		(substituted on) 64'
DF	20	Benjamin Henrichs		(substituted on) 81'
MF	17	Florian Wirtz		(substituted on) 81'
DF	16	Waldemar Anton		(substituted on) 88'
Manager:
Julian Nagelsmann			(yellow card) 59'

GK	1	Kasper Schmeichel (c)
CB	2	Joachim Andersen	(yellow card) 57'
CB	3	Jannik Vestergaard
CB	6	Andreas Christensen		(substituted off) 81'
RM	18	Alexander Bah		(substituted off) 81'
CM	8	Thomas Delaney		(substituted off) 69'
CM	23	Pierre-Emile Højbjerg
LM	5	Joakim Mæhle	(yellow card) 60'
AM	11	Andreas Skov Olsen		(substituted off) 69'
AM	10	Christian Eriksen
CF	9	Rasmus Højlund		(substituted off) 81'
Substitutions:
MF	15	Christian Nørgaard		(substituted on) 69'
FW	20	Yussuf Poulsen		(substituted on) 69'
FW	19	Jonas Wind		(substituted on) 81'
MF	26	Jacob Bruun Larsen		(substituted on) 81'
DF	17	Victor Kristiansen		(substituted on) 81'
Manager:
Kasper Hjulmand			(yellow card) 41'

Man of the Match:
Antonio Rüdiger (Germany)

Assistant referees:
Stuart Burt (England)
Dan Cook (England)
Fourth official:
Irfan Peljto (Bosnia and Herzegovina)
Reserve assistant referee:
Senad Ibrišimbegović (Bosnia and Herzegovina)
Video assistant referee:
Stuart Attwell (England)
Assistant video assistant referees:
David Coote (England)
Massimiliano Irrati (Italy)

=== England vs Slovakia ===
30 June 2024
18:00

England	2–1 (a.e.t.)	Slovakia
Bellingham 90+5'; Kane 91'	Report	Schranz 25'

Arena AufSchalke, Gelsenkirchen
Attendance: 47,244
Referee: Halil Umut Meler (Turkey)

England	Slovakia

GK	1	Jordan Pickford
RB	2	Kyle Walker
CB	5	John Stones
CB	6	Marc Guéhi	(yellow card) 3'
LB	12	Kieran Trippier		(substituted off) 66'
CM	26	Kobbie Mainoo	(yellow card) 7'	(substituted off) 84'
CM	4	Declan Rice
RW	7	Bukayo Saka
AM	10	Jude Bellingham	(yellow card) 17'	(substituted off) 106'
LW	11	Phil Foden		(substituted off) 90+4'
CF	9	Harry Kane (c)		(substituted off) 106'
Substitutions:
MF	24	Cole Palmer		(substituted on) 66'
FW	21	Eberechi Eze		(substituted on) 84'
FW	17	Ivan Toney		(substituted on) 90+4'
MF	16	Conor Gallagher		(substituted on) 106'
DF	14	Ezri Konsa		(substituted on) 106'
Manager:
Gareth Southgate

GK	1	Martin Dúbravka
RB	2	Peter Pekarík	(yellow card) 77'	(substituted off) 109'
CB	3	Denis Vavro	(yellow card) 108'
CB	14	Milan Škriniar (c)	(yellow card) 45+1'
LB	16	Dávid Hancko
CM	19	Juraj Kucka	(yellow card) 13'	(substituted off) 81'
CM	22	Stanislav Lobotka
CM	8	Ondrej Duda		(substituted off) 81'
RF	26	Ivan Schranz		(substituted off) 90+4'
CF	18	David Strelec		(substituted off) 61'
LF	17	Lukáš Haraslín		(substituted off) 61'
Substitutions:
MF	7	Tomáš Suslov	(yellow card) 120+2'	(substituted on) 61'
FW	9	Róbert Boženík		(substituted on) 61'
MF	11	László Bénes		(substituted on) 81'
MF	21	Matúš Bero		(substituted on) 81'
DF	6	Norbert Gyömbér	(yellow card) 114'	(substituted on) 90+4'
FW	10	Ľubomír Tupta		(substituted on) 109'
Manager:
(Italy) Francesco Calzona

Man of the Match:
Jude Bellingham (England)

Assistant referees:
Mustafa Emre Eyisoy (Turkey)
Kerem Ersoy (Turkey)
Fourth official:
Rade Obrenović (Slovenia)
Reserve assistant referee:
Jure Praprotnik (Slovenia)
Video assistant referee:
Marco Fritz (Germany)
Assistant video assistant referees:
Christian Dingert (Germany)
Tomasz Kwiatkowski (Poland)

=== Spain vs Georgia ===
30 June 2024
21:00

Spain	4–1	Georgia
Rodri 39'; Fabián 51'; Williams 75'; Olmo 83'	Report	Le Normand 18' (o.g.)

RheinEnergieStadion, Cologne
Attendance: 42,233
Referee: François Letexier (France)

Spain	Georgia

GK	23	Unai Simón
RB	2	Dani Carvajal		(substituted off) 81'
CB	3	Robin Le Normand
CB	14	Aymeric Laporte
LB	24	Marc Cucurella		(substituted off) 66'
CM	20	Pedri		(substituted off) 52'
CM	16	Rodri
CM	8	Fabián Ruiz		(substituted off) 81'
RF	19	Lamine Yamal
CF	7	Álvaro Morata (c)	(yellow card) 44'	(substituted off) 66'
LF	17	Nico Williams
Substitutions:
FW	10	Dani Olmo		(substituted on) 52'
DF	12	Álex Grimaldo		(substituted on) 66'
FW	21	Mikel Oyarzabal		(substituted on) 66'
FW	22	Jesús Navas		(substituted on) 81'
MF	6	Mikel Merino		(substituted on) 81'
Manager:
Luis de la Fuente

GK	25	Giorgi Mamardashvili
CB	15	Giorgi Gvelesiani		(substituted off) 78'
CB	4	Guram Kashia (c)
CB	3	Lasha Dvali
RWB	2	Otar Kakabadze
LWB	14	Luka Lochoshvili		(substituted off) 63'
CM	10	Giorgi Chakvetadze		(substituted off) 63'
CM	17	Otar Kiteishvili		(substituted off) 41'
CM	6	Giorgi Kochorashvili
CF	22	Georges Mikautadze		(substituted off) 78'
CF	7	Khvicha Kvaratskhelia
Substitutions:
MF	18	Sandro Altunashvili		(substituted on) 41'
MF	21	Giorgi Tsitaishvili		(substituted on) 63'
MF	9	Zuriko Davitashvili	(yellow card) 71'	(substituted on) 63'
FW	8	Budu Zivzivadze		(substituted on) 78'
MF	16	Nika Kvekveskiri		(substituted on) 78'
Manager:
(France) Willy Sagnol

Man of the Match:
Rodri (Spain)

Assistant referees:
Cyril Mugnier (France)
Mehdi Rahmouni (France)
Fourth official:
Serdar Gözübüyük (Netherlands)
Reserve assistant referee:
Johan Balder (Netherlands)
Video assistant referee:
Jérôme Brisard (France)
Assistant video assistant referees:
Willy Delajod (France)
Paolo Valeri (Italy)

=== France vs Belgium ===
The two sides had previously met in the 2020-2021 UEFA Nations League semi-finals, where France won 3-2. Their most recent tournament meeting was in the 2018 FIFA World Cup semi-finals, won 1-0 by France.

1 July 2024
18:00

France	1–0	Belgium
Vertonghen 85' (o.g.)	Report

Merkur Spiel-Arena, Düsseldorf
Attendance: 46,810
Referee: Glenn Nyberg (Sweden)

France	Belgium

GK	16	Mike Maignan
RB	5	Jules Koundé
CB	4	Dayot Upamecano
CB	17	William Saliba
LB	22	Théo Hernandez
CM	13	N'Golo Kanté
CM	8	Aurélien Tchouaméni	(yellow card) 14'
CM	14	Adrien Rabiot	(yellow card) 24'
AM	7	Antoine Griezmann	(yellow card) 23'
CF	15	Marcus Thuram		(substituted off) 62'
CF	10	Kylian Mbappé (c)
Substitutions:
FW	12	Randal Kolo Muani		(substituted on) 62'
Manager:
Didier Deschamps

GK	1	Koen Casteels
RB	21	Timothy Castagne		(substituted off) 88'
CB	4	Wout Faes
CB	5	Jan Vertonghen	(yellow card) 76'
LB	3	Arthur Theate
CM	7	Kevin De Bruyne (c)
CM	24	Amadou Onana
CM	11	Yannick Carrasco		(substituted off) 88'
RF	20	Loïs Openda		(substituted off) 63'
CF	10	Romelu Lukaku
LF	22	Jérémy Doku
Substitutions:
MF	18	Orel Mangala	(yellow card) 90+3'	(substituted on) 63'
FW	14	Dodi Lukebakio		(substituted on) 88'
FW	17	Charles De Ketelaere		(substituted on) 88'
Manager:
(Italy) Domenico Tedesco			(yellow card) 76'

Man of the Match:
Jules Koundé (France)

Assistant referees:
Mahbod Beigi (Sweden)
Andreas Söderkvist (Sweden)
Fourth official:
Donatas Rumšas (Lithuania)
Reserve assistant referee:
Aleksandr Radiuš (Lithuania)
Video assistant referee:
Pol van Boekel (Netherlands)
Assistant video assistant referees:
Bartosz Frankowski (Poland)
Rob Dieperink (Netherlands)

=== Portugal vs Slovenia ===
1 July 2024
21:00

Portugal	0–0 (a.e.t.)	Slovenia
	Report
Penalties
Ronaldo (penalty scored); Fernandes (penalty scored); B. Silva (penalty scored)	3–0	(penalty missed) Iličić; (penalty missed) Balkovec; (penalty missed) Verbič

Waldstadion, Frankfurt
Attendance: 46,576
Referee: Daniele Orsato (Italy)

Portugal	Slovenia

GK	22	Diogo Costa
RB	20	João Cancelo	(yellow card) 107'	(substituted off) 117'
CB	4	Rúben Dias
CB	3	Pepe		(substituted off) 117'
LB	19	Nuno Mendes
CM	8	Bruno Fernandes
CM	6	João Palhinha
CM	23	Vitinha		(substituted off) 65'
RF	10	Bernardo Silva
CF	7	Cristiano Ronaldo (c)
LF	17	Rafael Leão		(substituted off) 76'
Substitutions:
FW	21	Diogo Jota		(substituted on) 65'
FW	26	Francisco Conceição		(substituted on) 76'
DF	2	Nélson Semedo		(substituted on) 117'
MF	18	Rúben Neves		(substituted on) 117'
Manager:
(Spain) Roberto Martínez			(yellow card) 111'

GK	1	Jan Oblak (c)
RB	2	Žan Karničnik	(yellow card) 37'
CB	21	Vanja Drkušić	(yellow card) 32'
CB	6	Jaka Bijol	(yellow card) 106'
LB	3	Jure Balkovec	(yellow card) 107'
RM	20	Petar Stojanović		(substituted off) 87'
CM	22	Adam Gnezda Čerin
CM	10	Timi Max Elšnik		(substituted off) 106'
LM	17	Jan Mlakar		(substituted off) 74'
CF	9	Andraž Šporar		(substituted off) 74'
CF	11	Benjamin Šeško
Substitutions:
MF	5	Jon Gorenc Stanković		(substituted on) 74'
FW	19	Žan Celar	(yellow card) 101'	(substituted on) 74'
MF	7	Benjamin Verbič		(substituted on) 87'
FW	26	Josip Iličić		(substituted on) 106'
Manager:
Matjaž Kek			(red card) 105+1'

Man of the Match:
Diogo Costa (Portugal)

Assistant referees:
Ciro Carbone (Italy)
Alessandro Giallatini (Italy)
Fourth official:
Espen Eskås (Norway)
Reserve assistant referee:
Jan Erik Engan (Norway)
Video assistant referee:
Massimiliano Irrati (Italy)
Assistant video assistant referees:
Paolo Valeri (Italy)
Marco Fritz (Germany)

=== Romania vs Netherlands ===
The two sides had previously met in the UEFA Euro 2008 group stage, won 2-0 by the Netherlands.

2 July 2024
18:00

Romania	0–3	Netherlands
	Report	Gakpo 20'; Malen 83', 90+3'

Allianz Arena, Munich
Attendance: 65,012
Referee: Felix Zwayer (Germany)

Romania	Netherlands

GK	1	Florin Niță
RB	2	Andrei Rațiu
CB	3	Radu Drăgușin
CB	15	Andrei Burcă
LB	22	Vasile Mogoș		(substituted off) 38'
DM	6	Marius Marin	(yellow card) 67'	(substituted off) 72'
CM	21	Nicolae Stanciu (c)	(yellow card) 81'	(substituted off) 88'
CM	18	Răzvan Marin
RW	20	Dennis Man
LW	10	Ianis Hagi		(substituted off) 72'
CF	19	Denis Drăguș		(substituted off) 72'
Substitutions:
DF	24	Bogdan Racovițan		(substituted on) 38'
FW	13	Valentin Mihăilă		(substituted on) 72'
FW	7	Denis Alibec		(substituted on) 72'
MF	8	Alexandru Cicâldău		(substituted on) 72'
MF	14	Darius Olaru		(substituted on) 88'
Manager:
Edward Iordănescu

GK	1	Bart Verbruggen
RB	22	Denzel Dumfries	(yellow card) 78'
CB	6	Stefan de Vrij
CB	4	Virgil van Dijk (c)
LB	5	Nathan Aké		(substituted off) 69'
CM	24	Jerdy Schouten		(substituted off) 69'
CM	7	Xavi Simons
CM	14	Tijjani Reijnders
RF	25	Steven Bergwijn		(substituted off) 46'
CF	10	Memphis Depay		(substituted off) 90+2'
LF	11	Cody Gakpo		(substituted off) 84'
Substitutions:
FW	18	Donyell Malen	(yellow card) 90+4'	(substituted on) 46'
MF	16	Joey Veerman		(substituted on) 69'
DF	15	Micky van de Ven		(substituted on) 69'
FW	9	Wout Weghorst		(substituted on) 84'
DF	17	Daley Blind		(substituted on) 90+2'
Manager:
Ronald Koeman

Man of the Match:
Cody Gakpo (Netherlands)

Assistant referees:
Stefan Lupp (Germany)
Marco Achmüller (Germany)
Fourth official:
Daniel Siebert (Germany)
Reserve assistant referee:
Jan Seidel (Germany)
Video assistant referee:
Bastian Dankert (Germany)
Assistant video assistant referees:
Christian Dingert (Germany)
Jérôme Brisard (France)

=== Austria vs Turkey ===
2 July 2024
21:00

Austria	1–2	Turkey
Gregoritsch 66'	Report	Demiral 1', 59'

Red Bull Arena, Leipzig
Attendance: 38,305
Referee: Artur Soares Dias (Portugal)

Austria	Turkey

GK	13	Patrick Pentz
RB	5	Stefan Posch
CB	4	Kevin Danso
CB	15	Philipp Lienhart	(yellow card) 52'	(substituted off) 64'
LB	16	Phillipp Mwene		(substituted off) 46'
CM	6	Nicolas Seiwald
CM	9	Marcel Sabitzer
RW	20	Konrad Laimer		(substituted off) 64'
AM	19	Christoph Baumgartner
LW	18	Romano Schmid	(yellow card) 38'	(substituted off) 46'
CF	7	Marko Arnautović (c)
Substitutions:
MF	8	Alexander Prass		(substituted on) 46'
FW	11	Michael Gregoritsch		(substituted on) 46'
DF	2	Maximilian Wöber		(substituted on) 64'
MF	10	Florian Grillitsch		(substituted on) 64'
Manager:
(Germany) Ralf Rangnick

GK	1	Mert Günok
RB	18	Mert Müldür
CB	14	Abdülkerim Bardakcı
CB	3	Merih Demiral
LB	20	Ferdi Kadıoğlu
CM	16	İsmail Yüksek	(yellow card) 42'	(substituted off) 58'
CM	22	Kaan Ayhan (c)
RW	21	Barış Alper Yılmaz
AM	6	Orkun Kökçü	(yellow card) 11'	(substituted off) 83'
LW	19	Kenan Yıldız		(substituted off) 78'
CF	8	Arda Güler		(substituted off) 78'
Substitutions:
MF	15	Salih Özcan		(substituted on) 58'
MF	5	Okay Yokuşlu		(substituted on) 78'
FW	7	Kerem Aktürkoğlu		(substituted on) 78'
FW	17	İrfan Kahveci		(substituted on) 83'
Manager:
(Italy) Vincenzo Montella

Man of the Match:
Merih Demiral (Turkey)

Assistant referees:
Paulo Soares (Portugal)
Pedro Ribeiro (Portugal)
Fourth official:
Mykola Balakin (Ukraine)
Reserve assistant referee:
Oleksandr Berkut (Ukraine)
Video assistant referee:
Tiago Martins (Portugal)
Assistant video assistant referees:
Juan Martínez Munuera (Spain)
Massimiliano Irrati (Italy)

== Quarter-finals ==
=== Spain vs Germany ===
The sides most notably met in the UEFA Euro 2008 final, which Spain won 1–0. Their most recent tournament meeting was in the 2022 FIFA World Cup group stage, which ended in a 1–1 draw.

This was German midfielder Toni Kroos' last professional football match, as he had announced that he would retire after the Euros.

5 July 2024
18:00

Spain	2–1 (a.e.t.)	Germany
Olmo 51'; Merino 119'	Report	Wirtz 89'

MHPArena, Stuttgart
Attendance: 54,000
Referee: Anthony Taylor (England)

Spain	Germany

GK	23	Unai Simón	(yellow card) 82'
RB	2	Dani Carvajal	(yellow card) 100' (yellow-red card) 120+6'
CB	3	Robin Le Normand	(yellow card) 29'	(substituted off) 46'
CB	14	Aymeric Laporte
LB	24	Marc Cucurella
CM	16	Rodri	(yellow card) 110'
CM	8	Fabián Ruiz	(yellow card) 120'	(substituted off) 102'
RW	19	Lamine Yamal		(substituted off) 63'
AM	20	Pedri		(substituted off) 8'
LW	17	Nico Williams		(substituted off) 80'
CF	7	Álvaro Morata (c)		(substituted off) 80'
Substitutions:
FW	10	Dani Olmo		(substituted on) 8'
DF	4	Nacho		(substituted on) 46'
FW	11	Ferran Torres	(yellow card) 74'	(substituted on) 63'
MF	6	Mikel Merino		(substituted on) 80'
FW	21	Mikel Oyarzabal		(substituted on) 80'
FW	9	Joselu		(substituted on) 102'
Manager:
Luis de la Fuente

GK	1	Manuel Neuer
RB	6	Joshua Kimmich
CB	2	Antonio Rüdiger	(yellow card) 13'
CB	4	Jonathan Tah		(substituted off) 80'
LB	3	David Raum	(yellow card) 28'	(substituted off) 57'
CM	25	Emre Can		(substituted off) 46'
CM	8	Toni Kroos	(yellow card) 67'
RW	10	Jamal Musiala
AM	21	İlkay Gündoğan (c)		(substituted off) 57'
LW	19	Leroy Sané		(substituted off) 46'
CF	7	Kai Havertz		(substituted off) 91'
Substitutions:
MF	23	Robert Andrich	(yellow card) 56'	(substituted on) 46'
MF	17	Florian Wirtz	(yellow card) 94'	(substituted on) 46'
DF	18	Maximilian Mittelstädt	(yellow card) 73'	(substituted on) 57'
FW	9	Niclas Füllkrug		(substituted on) 57'
FW	13	Thomas Müller		(substituted on) 80'
DF	16	Waldemar Anton		(substituted on) 91'
Other disciplinary actions:
MF	15	Nico Schlotterbeck	(yellow card) 89'
FW	26	Deniz Undav	(yellow card) 113'
Manager:
Julian Nagelsmann

Man of the Match:
Dani Olmo (Spain)

Assistant referees:
Gary Beswick (England)
Adam Nunn (England)
Fourth official:
Ivan Kružliak (Slovakia)
Reserve assistant referee:
Jan Pozor (Slovakia)
Video assistant referee:
Stuart Attwell (England)
Assistant video assistant referees:
Bartosz Frankowski (Poland)
Massimiliano Irrati (Italy)

=== Portugal vs France ===
The sides previously met in the UEFA Euro 2020 group stage, where the match ended a 2–2 draw. Their most notable meeting was in the UEFA Euro 2016 final, where Portugal won 1–0 after extra time.

This was Portuguese defender Pepe's last professional football match.

5 July 2024
21:00

Portugal	0–0 (a.e.t.)	France
	Report
Penalties
Ronaldo (penalty scored); B. Silva (penalty scored); Félix (penalty missed); Mendes (penalty scored)	3–5	(penalty scored) Dembélé; (penalty scored) Fofana; (penalty scored) Koundé; (penalty scored) Barcola; (penalty scored) Hernandez

Volksparkstadion, Hamburg
Attendance: 47,789
Referee: Michael Oliver (England)

Portugal	France

GK	22	Diogo Costa
RB	20	João Cancelo		(substituted off) 74'
CB	3	Pepe
CB	4	Rúben Dias
LB	19	Nuno Mendes
CM	23	Vitinha		(substituted off) 119'
CM	6	João Palhinha	(yellow card) 79'	(substituted off) 90+2'
CM	8	Bruno Fernandes		(substituted off) 74'
RF	10	Bernardo Silva
CF	7	Cristiano Ronaldo (c)
LF	17	Rafael Leão		(substituted off) 106'
Substitutions:
DF	2	Nélson Semedo		(substituted on) 74'
FW	26	Francisco Conceição		(substituted on) 74'
MF	18	Rúben Neves		(substituted on) 90+2'
FW	11	João Félix		(substituted on) 106'
MF	16	Matheus Nunes		(substituted on) 119'
Manager:
(Spain) Roberto Martínez

GK	16	Mike Maignan
RB	5	Jules Koundé
CB	4	Dayot Upamecano
CB	17	William Saliba	(yellow card) 84'
LB	22	Théo Hernandez
CM	13	N'Golo Kanté
CM	8	Aurélien Tchouaméni
CM	6	Eduardo Camavinga		(substituted off) 91'
AM	7	Antoine Griezmann		(substituted off) 67'
CF	12	Randal Kolo Muani		(substituted off) 86'
CF	10	Kylian Mbappé (c)		(substituted off) 106'
Substitutions:
FW	11	Ousmane Dembélé		(substituted on) 67'
FW	15	Marcus Thuram		(substituted on) 86'
MF	19	Youssouf Fofana		(substituted on) 91'
FW	25	Bradley Barcola		(substituted on) 106'
Manager:
Didier Deschamps

Man of the Match:
Ousmane Dembélé (France)

Assistant referees:
Stuart Burt (England)
Dan Cook (England)
Fourth official:
Szymon Marciniak (Poland)
Reserve assistant referee:
Tomasz Listkiewicz (Poland)
Video assistant referee:
Pol van Boekel (Netherlands)
Assistant video assistant referees:
David Coote (England)
Tomasz Kwiatkowski (Poland)

=== England vs Switzerland ===
6 July 2024
18:00

England	1–1 (a.e.t.)	Switzerland
Saka 80'	Report	Embolo 75'
Penalties
Palmer (penalty scored); Bellingham (penalty scored); Saka (penalty scored); Toney (penalty scored); Alexander-Arnold (penalty scored)	5–3	(penalty missed) Akanji; (penalty scored) Schär; (penalty scored) Shaqiri; (penalty scored) Amdouni

Merkur Spiel-Arena, Düsseldorf
Attendance: 46,907
Referee: Daniele Orsato (Italy)

England	Switzerland

GK	1	Jordan Pickford
CB	2	Kyle Walker
CB	5	John Stones
CB	14	Ezri Konsa		(substituted off) 78'
RWB	12	Kieran Trippier		(substituted off) 78'
LWB	7	Bukayo Saka
CM	26	Kobbie Mainoo		(substituted off) 78'
CM	4	Declan Rice
AM	10	Jude Bellingham
AM	11	Phil Foden		(substituted off) 115'
CF	9	Harry Kane (c)	(yellow card) 67'	(substituted off) 109'
Substitutions:
DF	3	Luke Shaw		(substituted on) 78'
MF	24	Cole Palmer		(substituted on) 78'
FW	21	Eberechi Eze		(substituted on) 78'
FW	17	Ivan Toney		(substituted on) 109'
DF	8	Trent Alexander-Arnold		(substituted on) 115'
Manager:
Gareth Southgate

GK	1	Yann Sommer
CB	22	Fabian Schär	(yellow card) 32'
CB	5	Manuel Akanji
CB	13	Ricardo Rodriguez
RM	26	Fabian Rieder		(substituted off) 63'
CM	8	Remo Freuler		(substituted off) 118'
CM	10	Granit Xhaka (c)
LM	20	Michel Aebischer		(substituted off) 118'
RF	19	Dan Ndoye		(substituted off) 98'
CF	7	Breel Embolo		(substituted off) 109'
LF	17	Rubén Vargas		(substituted off) 63'
Substitutions:
DF	3	Silvan Widmer	(yellow card) 85'	(substituted on) 63'
MF	14	Steven Zuber		(substituted on) 63'
MF	6	Denis Zakaria		(substituted on) 98'
MF	23	Xherdan Shaqiri		(substituted on) 109'
MF	16	Vincent Sierro		(substituted on) 118'
FW	25	Zeki Amdouni		(substituted on) 118'
Manager:
Murat Yakin

Man of the Match:
Bukayo Saka (England)

Assistant referees:
Ciro Carbone (Italy)
Alessandro Giallatini (Italy)
Fourth official:
Daniel Siebert (Germany)
Reserve assistant referee:
Rafael Foltyn (Germany)
Video assistant referee:
Massimiliano Irrati (Italy)
Assistant video assistant referees:
Paolo Valeri (Italy)
Bastian Dankert (Germany)

=== Netherlands vs Turkey ===
6 July 2024
21:00

Netherlands	2–1	Turkey
De Vrij 70'; Müldür 76' (o.g.)	Report	Akaydin 35'

Olympiastadion, Berlin
Attendance: 70,091
Referee: Clément Turpin (France)

Netherlands	Turkey

GK	1	Bart Verbruggen
RB	22	Denzel Dumfries
CB	6	Stefan de Vrij
CB	4	Virgil van Dijk (c)	(yellow card) 64'
LB	5	Nathan Aké	(yellow card) 54'	(substituted off) 73'
CM	24	Jerdy Schouten
CM	7	Xavi Simons	(yellow card) 30'	(substituted off) 87'
CM	14	Tijjani Reijnders		(substituted off) 73'
RF	25	Steven Bergwijn		(substituted off) 46'
CF	10	Memphis Depay		(substituted off) 87'
LF	11	Cody Gakpo
Substitutions:
FW	9	Wout Weghorst	(yellow card) 90+6'	(substituted on) 46'
MF	16	Joey Veerman		(substituted on) 73'
DF	15	Micky van de Ven		(substituted on) 73'
DF	12	Jeremie Frimpong		(substituted on) 87'
FW	21	Joshua Zirkzee		(substituted on) 87'
Manager:
Ronald Koeman

GK	1	Mert Günok
CB	22	Kaan Ayhan		(substituted off) 89'
CB	4	Samet Akaydin		(substituted off) 82'
CB	14	Abdülkerim Bardakcı
RWB	18	Mert Müldür		(substituted off) 82'
LWB	20	Ferdi Kadıoğlu
RM	21	Barış Alper Yılmaz
CM	15	Salih Özcan		(substituted off) 77'
CM	10	Hakan Çalhanoğlu (c)
LM	19	Kenan Yıldız		(substituted off) 77'
CF	8	Arda Güler
Substitutions:
MF	5	Okay Yokuşlu		(substituted on) 77'
FW	7	Kerem Aktürkoğlu		(substituted on) 77'
DF	2	Zeki Çelik		(substituted on) 82'
FW	9	Cenk Tosun	(yellow card) 90+3'	(substituted on) 82'
FW	24	Semih Kılıçsoy		(substituted on) 89'
Other disciplinary actions:
FW	26	Bertuğ Yıldırım	(red card) 90+6'
Manager:
(Italy) Vincenzo Montella			(yellow card) 90+5'

Man of the Match:
Stefan de Vrij (Netherlands)

Assistant referees:
Nicolas Danos (France)
Benjamin Pagès (France)
Fourth official:
Felix Zwayer (Germany)
Reserve assistant referee:
Marco Achmüller (Germany)
Video assistant referee:
Jérôme Brisard (France)
Assistant video assistant referees:
Willy Delajod (France)
Marco Fritz (Germany)

== Semi-finals ==
=== Spain vs France ===
The sides previously met in the UEFA Euro 1984 final, where hosts France prevailed 2–0, the most recent team to win the Euros on home soil. They also played each other in the 2021 UEFA Nations League final, which France won 2–1.

Spain's Lamine Yamal, aged 16, became the youngest player to score in the UEFA European Championship final tournament. Yamal broke the record set by Johan Vonlanthen, then aged 18, in 2004.

9 July 2024
21:00

Spain	2–1	France
Yamal 21'; Olmo 25'	Report	Kolo Muani 9'

Allianz Arena, Munich
Attendance: 62,042
Referee: Slavko Vinčić (Slovenia)

Spain	France

GK	23	Unai Simón
RB	22	Jesús Navas	(yellow card) 14'	(substituted off) 58'
CB	4	Nacho
CB	14	Aymeric Laporte
LB	24	Marc Cucurella
CM	16	Rodri
CM	8	Fabián Ruiz
RW	19	Lamine Yamal	(yellow card) 90+1'	(substituted off) 90+4'
AM	10	Dani Olmo		(substituted off) 76'
LW	17	Nico Williams		(substituted off) 90+3'
CF	7	Álvaro Morata (c)		(substituted off) 76'
Substitutions:
DF	5	Daniel Vivian		(substituted on) 58'
FW	21	Mikel Oyarzabal		(substituted on) 76'
MF	6	Mikel Merino		(substituted on) 76'
MF	18	Martín Zubimendi		(substituted on) 90+3'
FW	11	Ferran Torres		(substituted on) 90+4'
Manager:
Luis de la Fuente

GK	16	Mike Maignan
RB	5	Jules Koundé
CB	4	Dayot Upamecano
CB	17	William Saliba
LB	22	Théo Hernandez
CM	13	N'Golo Kanté		(substituted off) 62'
CM	8	Aurélien Tchouaméni	(yellow card) 60'
CM	14	Adrien Rabiot		(substituted off) 62'
RF	11	Ousmane Dembélé		(substituted off) 79'
CF	12	Randal Kolo Muani		(substituted off) 62'
LF	10	Kylian Mbappé (c)
Substitutions:
MF	6	Eduardo Camavinga	(yellow card) 89'	(substituted on) 62'
MF	7	Antoine Griezmann		(substituted on) 62'
FW	25	Bradley Barcola		(substituted on) 62'
FW	9	Olivier Giroud		(substituted on) 79'
Manager:
Didier Deschamps

Man of the Match:
Lamine Yamal (Spain)

Assistant referees:
Tomaž Klančnik (Slovenia)
Andraž Kovačič (Slovenia)
Fourth official:
Ivan Kružliak (Slovakia)
Reserve assistant referee:
Branislav Hancko (Slovakia)
Video assistant referee:
Nejc Kajtazovič (Slovenia)
Assistant video assistant referees:
Paolo Valeri (Italy)
Massimiliano Irrati (Italy)

=== Netherlands vs England ===
This was the first meeting between the sides in a World Cup or European Championship since 1996, which England won 4–1.

10 July 2024
21:00

Netherlands	1–2	England
Simons 7'	Report	Kane 18' (pen.); Watkins 90'

Westfalenstadion, Dortmund
Attendance: 60,926
Referee: Felix Zwayer (Germany)

Netherlands	England

GK	1	Bart Verbruggen
RB	22	Denzel Dumfries	(yellow card) 17'	(substituted off) 90+3'
CB	6	Stefan de Vrij
CB	4	Virgil van Dijk (c)	(yellow card) 87'
LB	5	Nathan Aké
CM	24	Jerdy Schouten
CM	7	Xavi Simons	(yellow card) 90+1'	(substituted off) 90+3'
CM	14	Tijjani Reijnders
RF	18	Donyell Malen		(substituted off) 46'
CF	10	Memphis Depay		(substituted off) 35'
LF	11	Cody Gakpo
Substitutions:
MF	16	Joey Veerman		(substituted on) 35'
FW	9	Wout Weghorst		(substituted on) 46'
FW	19	Brian Brobbey		(substituted on) 90+3'
FW	21	Joshua Zirkzee		(substituted on) 90+3'
Manager:
Ronald Koeman

GK	1	Jordan Pickford
CB	2	Kyle Walker
CB	5	John Stones
CB	6	Marc Guéhi
RM	7	Bukayo Saka	(yellow card) 86'	(substituted off) 90+3'
CM	26	Kobbie Mainoo		(substituted off) 90+3'
CM	4	Declan Rice
LM	12	Kieran Trippier	(yellow card) 90+4'	(substituted off) 46'
AM	11	Phil Foden		(substituted off) 81'
AM	10	Jude Bellingham	(yellow card) 72'
CF	9	Harry Kane (c)		(substituted off) 81'
Substitutions:
DF	3	Luke Shaw		(substituted on) 46'
MF	24	Cole Palmer		(substituted on) 81'
FW	19	Ollie Watkins		(substituted on) 81'
DF	14	Ezri Konsa		(substituted on) 90+3'
MF	16	Conor Gallagher		(substituted on) 90+3'
Manager:
Gareth Southgate

Man of the Match:
Ollie Watkins (England)

Assistant referees:
Stefan Lupp (Germany)
Marco Achmüller (Germany)
Fourth official:
Daniel Siebert (Germany)
Reserve assistant referee:
Rafael Foltyn (Germany)
Video assistant referee:
Bastian Dankert (Germany)
Assistant video assistant referees:
Christian Dingert (Germany)
Marco Fritz (Germany)

== Final ==
14 July 2024
21:00

Spain	2–1	England
Williams 47'; Oyarzabal 86'	Report	Palmer 73'

Olympiastadion, Berlin
Attendance: 65,600
Referee: François Letexier (France)

Spain	England

GK	23	Unai Simón
RB	2	Dani Carvajal
CB	3	Robin Le Normand		(substituted off) 83'
CB	14	Aymeric Laporte
LB	24	Marc Cucurella
CM	16	Rodri		(substituted off) 46'
CM	8	Fabián Ruiz
RW	19	Lamine Yamal		(substituted off) 89'
AM	10	Dani Olmo	(yellow card) 31'
LW	17	Nico Williams
CF	7	Álvaro Morata (C)		(substituted off) 68'
Substitutions:
MF	18	Martín Zubimendi		(substituted on) 46'
FW	21	Mikel Oyarzabal		(substituted on) 68'
DF	4	Nacho		(substituted on) 83'
MF	6	Mikel Merino		(substituted on) 89'
Manager:
Luis de la Fuente

GK	1	Jordan Pickford
CB	2	Kyle Walker
CB	5	John Stones	(yellow card) 53'
CB	6	Marc Guéhi
RM	7	Bukayo Saka
CM	26	Kobbie Mainoo		(substituted off) 70'
CM	4	Declan Rice
LM	3	Luke Shaw
AM	11	Phil Foden		(substituted off) 89'
AM	10	Jude Bellingham
CF	9	Harry Kane (C)	(yellow card) 25'	(substituted off) 61'
Substitutions:
FW	19	Ollie Watkins	(yellow card) 90+1'	(substituted on) 61'
MF	24	Cole Palmer		(substituted on) 70'
FW	17	Ivan Toney		(substituted on) 89'
Manager:
Gareth Southgate

Man of the Match:
Nico Williams (Spain)

Assistant referees:
Cyril Mugnier (France)
Mehdi Rahmouni (France)
Fourth official:
Szymon Marciniak (Poland)
Reserve assistant referee:
Tomasz Listkiewicz (Poland)
Video assistant referee:
Jérôme Brisard (France)
Assistant video assistant referees:
Willy Delajod (France)
Massimiliano Irrati (Italy)
