= Slovenia at the FIFA World Cup =

International football delegation

The Slovenia national football team have appeared at the FIFA World Cup twice, in 2002 and 2010, being eliminated in the group stage on both occasions. They achieved their first and so far only victory at the World Cup in 2010, when they beat Algeria 1–0 with a goal by Robert Koren.

== Overall record ==
From 1930 to 1990, Slovenia did not compete at the World Cup as the country was part of Yugoslavia. Since their independence in 1991, Slovenia have qualified for two World Cups and was eliminated in the group stage on both occasions.

FIFA World Cup record									Qualification record						
Year	Round	Pld	W	D	L	GF	GA	Squad	Pos.	Pld	W	D	L	GF	GA
1930 to 1990	Part of Yugoslavia								Part of Yugoslavia						
(United States) 1994	Did not enter								Did not enter						
(France) 1998	Did not qualify								5th	8	0	1	7	5	20
(South Korea) (Japan) 2002	Group stage	3	0	0	3	2	7	Squad	2nd (PO)	12	6	6	0	20	11
(Germany) 2006	Did not qualify								4th	10	3	3	4	10	13
(South Africa) 2010	Group stage	3	1	1	1	3	3	Squad	2nd (PO)	12	7	2	3	20	6
(Brazil) 2014	Did not qualify								3rd	10	5	0	5	14	11
(Russia) 2018	Did not qualify								4th	10	4	3	3	12	7
(Qatar) 2022	Did not qualify								4th	10	4	2	4	13	12
(Canada) (Mexico) (United States) 2026	Did not qualify								3rd	6	0	4	2	3	8
(Morocco) (Portugal) (Spain) 2030	To be determined								To be determined						
(Saudi Arabia) 2034	To be determined								To be determined						
Total	Group stage	6	1	1	4	5	10	—	2/8	78	29	21	28	97	88

== 2002 FIFA World Cup ==
Slovenia qualified for their first World Cup in 2002 under the management of Srečko Katanec. They suffered a 3–1 defeat to Spain in their opening game. Katanec's decision to substitute midfielder Zlatko Zahovič led to an argument that ended with Zahovič being expelled from the team and sent home, and Katanec announced his intention to resign as manager after the tournament. Slovenia lost their second game 1–0 to South Africa, leaving them unable to qualify from the group. The side's final game ended in a 3–1 defeat to Paraguay.

=== Group B ===
Pos	Team	Pld	W	D	L	GF	GA	GD	Pts	Qualification
1	Spain	3	3	0	0	9	4	+5	9	Advance to knockout stage
2	Paraguay	3	1	1	1	6	6	0	4	Advance to knockout stage
3	South Africa	3	1	1	1	5	5	0	4	
4	Slovenia	3	0	0	3	2	7	−5	0	

Source: FIFA
Rules for classification: Tie-breaking criteria
2 June 2002
20:30

Spain	3–1	Slovenia
Raúl 44'; Valerón 74'; Hierro 87' (pen.)	Report	Cimirotič 82'

Gwangju World Cup Stadium, Gwangju
Attendance: 28,598
Referee: Mohammed Guezzaz (Morocco)

8 June 2002
15:30

South Africa	1–0	Slovenia
Nomvethe 4'	Report

Daegu World Cup Stadium, Daegu
Attendance: 47,226
Referee: Ángel Sánchez (Argentina)

12 June 2002
20:30

Slovenia	1–3	Paraguay
Ačimovič 45+1'	Report	Cuevas 65', 84'; Campos 73'

Jeju World Cup Stadium, Seogwipo
Attendance: 30,176
Referee: Felipe Ramos Rizo (Mexico)

== 2010 FIFA World Cup ==
Slovenia were the smallest country in terms of population to qualify for the 2010 World Cup. Under the management of Matjaž Kek, the team qualified for the tournament by winning the two-legged play-off against Russia, despite losing the first leg. Slovenia beat Algeria 1–0 in their opening game, securing their first ever World Cup victory, and drew 2–2 with the United States. This meant that the side only needed a draw in their final group game against England to reach the knockout stage. However, a 1–0 loss to England and a United States victory over Algeria saw Slovenia finish third in the group and fail to advance.

=== Group C ===
Pos	Team	Pld	W	D	L	GF	GA	GD	Pts	Qualification
1	United States	3	1	2	0	4	3	+1	5	Advance to knockout stage
2	England	3	1	2	0	2	1	+1	5	Advance to knockout stage
3	Slovenia	3	1	1	1	3	3	0	4	
4	Algeria	3	0	1	2	0	2	−2	1	

Source: FIFA
Rules for classification: Tie-breaking criteria
13 June 2010
13:30

Algeria	0–1	Slovenia
	Report	Koren 78'

Peter Mokaba Stadium, Polokwane
Attendance: 30,325
Referee: Carlos Batres (Guatemala)

18 June 2010
16:00

Slovenia	2–2	United States
Birsa 12'; Ljubijankić 41'	Report	Donovan 47'; Bradley 81'

Ellis Park Stadium, Johannesburg
Attendance: 45,573
Referee: Koman Coulibaly (Mali)

23 June 2010
16:00

Slovenia	0–1	England
	Report	Defoe 22'

Nelson Mandela Bay Stadium, Port Elizabeth
Attendance: 36,893
Referee: Wolfgang Stark (Germany)

== Player records ==
=== Most appearances ===
Slovenia's 2010 squad did not feature a single player from the 2002 tournament, so no player had the chance to play more than three World Cup matches for Slovenia.

Rank	Player	Matches	World Cups
1	Milenko Ačimovič	3	2002
1	Aleš Čeh	3	2002
1	Sebastjan Cimirotič	3	2002
1	Amir Karić	3	2002
1	Željko Milinovič	3	2002
1	Džoni Novak	3	2002
1	Milan Osterc	3	2002
1	Miran Pavlin	3	2002
1	Mladen Rudonja	3	2002
1	Valter Birsa	3	2010
1	Mišo Brečko	3	2010
1	Boštjan Cesar	3	2010
1	Zlatko Dedić	3	2010
1	Samir Handanović	3	2010
1	Bojan Jokić	3	2010
1	Andraž Kirm	3	2010
1	Robert Koren	3	2010
1	Zlatan Ljubijankić	3	2010
1	Milivoje Novaković	3	2010
1	Aleksandar Radosavljević	3	2010
1	Marko Šuler	3	2010

=== Goalscorers ===
Five Slovenian players each scored one goal at the FIFA World Cup.

Rank	Player	Goals	World Cups
1	Milenko Ačimovič	1	2002
1	Sebastjan Cimirotič	1	2002
1	Valter Birsa	1	2010
1	Robert Koren	1	2010
1	Zlatan Ljubijankić	1	2010

== See also ==
- Slovenia at the UEFA European Championship
