= UEFA Euro 2024 Group C =

Football tournament group stage

Group C of UEFA Euro 2024 took place from 16 to 25 June 2024. The group contained Slovenia, Denmark, Serbia and England. Slovenia's qualification to the knockout stage was the first time they had done so in a major tournament since becoming an independent country.

== Teams ==
Draw position	Team	Pot	Method of qualification	Date of qualification	Finals appearance	Last appearance	Previous best performance	Qualifying Rankings November 2023 (Note: The European Qualifiers overall rankings from November 2023 were used for seeding for the final draw.)	FIFA Rankings April 2024
C1	Slovenia	3	Group H runner-up	20 November 2023	2nd	2000	Group stage (2000)	15	57
C2	Denmark	2	Group H winner	17 November 2023	10th	2020	Winners (1992)	9	21
C3	Serbia (Note: From 1960 to 1984, Serbia competed as Yugoslavia, and in 2000 as FR Yugoslavia.)	4	Group G runner-up	19 November 2023	6th	2000	Runners-up (1960, 1968)	19	33
C4	England	1	Group C winner	17 October 2023	11th	2020	Runners-up (2020)	5	4

== Standings ==
Pos	Team	Pld	W	D	L	GF	GA	GD	Pts	Qualification
1	England	3	1	2	0	2	1	+1	5	Advance to knockout stage
2	Denmark	3	0	3	0	2	2	0	3 (Note: Tied on head-to-head result (Slovenia 1–1 Denmark), overall goal difference and overall goals scored. Disciplinary points: Denmark −6, Slovenia −7.)	Advance to knockout stage
3	Slovenia	3	0	3	0	2	2	0	3	Advance to knockout stage
4	Serbia	3	0	2	1	1	2	−1	2	

Source: UEFA
Rules for classification: Group stage tiebreakers
Notes:

In the round of 16,

- The winner of Group C, England, advanced to play the third-placed team of Group E, Slovakia.
- The runner-up of Group C, Denmark, advanced to play the winner of Group A, Germany.
- The third-placed team of Group C, Slovenia, advanced to play the winner of Group F, Portugal.

== Matches ==
=== Slovenia vs Denmark ===
16 June 2024
18:00

Slovenia	1–1	Denmark
Janža 77'	Report	Eriksen 17'

MHPArena, Stuttgart
Attendance: 54,000
Referee: Sandro Schärer (Switzerland)

Slovenia	Denmark

GK	1	Jan Oblak (c)
RB	2	Žan Karničnik
CB	21	Vanja Drkušić
CB	6	Jaka Bijol
LB	13	Erik Janža
RM	20	Petar Stojanović	(yellow card) 53'	(substituted off) 67'
CM	22	Adam Gnezda Čerin
CM	10	Timi Max Elšnik		(substituted off) 75'
LM	17	Jan Mlakar		(substituted off) 75'
CF	9	Andraž Šporar		(substituted off) 90+5'
CF	11	Benjamin Šeško		(substituted off) 90+5'
Substitutions:
MF	7	Benjamin Verbič		(substituted on) 67'
FW	19	Žan Celar	(yellow card) 84'	(substituted on) 75'
MF	5	Jon Gorenc Stanković		(substituted on) 75'
DF	23	David Brekalo		(substituted on) 90+5'
MF	14	Jasmin Kurtić		(substituted on) 90+5'
Other disciplinary actions:
TS	—	Milivoje Novaković	(yellow card) 70'
Manager:
Matjaž Kek

GK	1	Kasper Schmeichel (c)
CB	6	Andreas Christensen
CB	2	Joachim Andersen
CB	3	Jannik Vestergaard
RM	18	Alexander Bah
CM	21	Morten Hjulmand	(yellow card) 49'	(substituted off) 89'
CM	23	Pierre-Emile Højbjerg		(substituted off) 83'
LM	17	Victor Kristiansen		(substituted off) 78'
AM	10	Christian Eriksen
CF	19	Jonas Wind		(substituted off) 83'
CF	9	Rasmus Højlund		(substituted off) 83'
Substitutions:
DF	5	Joakim Mæhle		(substituted on) 78'
FW	20	Yussuf Poulsen		(substituted on) 83'
FW	12	Kasper Dolberg		(substituted on) 83'
MF	15	Christian Nørgaard		(substituted on) 83'
MF	8	Thomas Delaney		(substituted on) 89'
Manager:
Kasper Hjulmand

Man of the Match:
Christian Eriksen (Denmark)

Assistant referees:
Stéphane de Almeida (Switzerland)
Bekim Zogaj (Switzerland)
Fourth official:
Donatas Rumšas (Lithuania)
Reserve assistant referee:
Aleksandr Radiuš (Lithuania)
Video assistant referee:
Fedayi San (Switzerland)
Assistant video assistant referees:
Bartosz Frankowski (Poland)
Tomasz Kwiatkowski (Poland)

=== Serbia vs England ===
16 June 2024
21:00

Serbia	0–1	England
	Report	Bellingham 13'

Arena AufSchalke, Gelsenkirchen
Attendance: 48,953
Referee: Daniele Orsato (Italy)

Serbia	England

GK	1	Predrag Rajković
CB	13	Miloš Veljković
CB	4	Nikola Milenković
CB	2	Strahinja Pavlović
DM	6	Nemanja Gudelj	(yellow card) 39'	(substituted off) 46'
CM	20	Sergej Milinković-Savić
CM	22	Saša Lukić		(substituted off) 61'
RW	14	Andrija Živković		(substituted off) 74'
LW	11	Filip Kostić		(substituted off) 43'
SS	7	Dušan Vlahović
CF	9	Aleksandar Mitrović (c)		(substituted off) 61'
Substitutions:
DF	25	Filip Mladenović		(substituted on) 43'
MF	17	Ivan Ilić		(substituted on) 46'
MF	10	Dušan Tadić	(yellow card) 75'	(substituted on) 61'
FW	8	Luka Jović		(substituted on) 61'
MF	26	Veljko Birmančević		(substituted on) 74'
Manager:
Dragan Stojković			(yellow card) 83'

GK	1	Jordan Pickford
RB	2	Kyle Walker
CB	5	John Stones
CB	6	Marc Guéhi
LB	12	Kieran Trippier
CM	8	Trent Alexander-Arnold	(substituted off) 69'
CM	4	Declan Rice
RW	7	Bukayo Saka	(substituted off) 76'
AM	10	Jude Bellingham	(substituted off) 86'
LW	11	Phil Foden
CF	9	Harry Kane (c)
Substitutions:
MF	16	Conor Gallagher	(substituted on) 69'
FW	20	Jarrod Bowen	(substituted on) 76'
MF	26	Kobbie Mainoo	(substituted on) 86'
Manager:
Gareth Southgate

Man of the Match:
Jude Bellingham (England)

Assistant referees:
Ciro Carbone (Italy)
Alessandro Giallatini (Italy)
Fourth official:
Ivan Kružliak (Slovakia)
Reserve assistant referee:
Branislav Hancko (Slovakia)
Video assistant referee:
Massimiliano Irrati (Italy)
Assistant video assistant referees:
Paolo Valeri (Italy)
Cătălin Popa (Romania)

=== Slovenia vs Serbia ===
20 June 2024
15:00

Slovenia	1–1	Serbia
Karničnik 69'	Report	Jović 90+5'

Allianz Arena, Munich
Attendance: 63,028
Referee: István Kovács (Romania)

Slovenia	Serbia

GK	1	Jan Oblak (c)
RB	2	Žan Karničnik
CB	21	Vanja Drkušić
CB	6	Jaka Bijol
LB	13	Erik Janža	(yellow card) 87'
RM	20	Petar Stojanović		(substituted off) 76'
CM	22	Adam Gnezda Čerin
CM	10	Timi Max Elšnik		(substituted off) 90+1'
LM	17	Jan Mlakar		(substituted off) 64'
CF	9	Andraž Šporar
CF	11	Benjamin Šeško		(substituted off) 76'
Substitutions:
MF	5	Jon Gorenc Stanković		(substituted on) 64'
MF	7	Benjamin Verbič		(substituted on) 76'
FW	18	Žan Vipotnik	(yellow card) 90+4'	(substituted on) 76'
DF	23	David Brekalo		(substituted on) 90+1'
Manager:
Matjaž Kek

GK	1	Predrag Rajković
CB	13	Miloš Veljković
CB	4	Nikola Milenković
CB	2	Strahinja Pavlović
CM	17	Ivan Ilić
CM	22	Saša Lukić	(yellow card) 54'	(substituted off) 64'
RM	14	Andrija Živković		(substituted off) 82'
AM	10	Dušan Tadić (c)		(substituted off) 82'
LM	25	Filip Mladenović	(yellow card) 25'	(substituted off) 46'
CF	7	Dušan Vlahović		(substituted off) 64'
CF	9	Aleksandar Mitrović
Substitutions:
MF	21	Mijat Gaćinović	(yellow card) 90+3'	(substituted on) 46'
MF	20	Sergej Milinković-Savić		(substituted on) 64'
FW	8	Luka Jović	(yellow card) 90+2'	(substituted on) 64'
MF	26	Veljko Birmančević		(substituted on) 82'
MF	19	Lazar Samardžić		(substituted on) 82'
Manager:
Dragan Stojković

Man of the Match:
Žan Karničnik (Slovenia)

Assistant referees:
Vasile Marinescu (Romania)
Mihai Ovidiu Artene (Romania)
Fourth official:
Espen Eskås (Norway)
Reserve assistant referee:
Jan Erik Engan (Norway)
Video assistant referee:
Pol van Boekel (Netherlands)
Assistant video assistant referees:
Rob Dieperink (Netherlands)
Marco Fritz (Germany)

=== Denmark vs England ===
20 June 2024
18:00

Denmark	1–1	England
Hjulmand 34'	Report	Kane 18'

Waldstadion, Frankfurt
Attendance: 46,177
Referee: Artur Soares Dias (Portugal)

Denmark	England

GK	1	Kasper Schmeichel (c)
CB	2	Joachim Andersen
CB	6	Andreas Christensen
CB	3	Jannik Vestergaard	(yellow card) 27'
RM	5	Joakim Mæhle	(yellow card) 73'
CM	21	Morten Hjulmand		(substituted off) 82'
CM	23	Pierre-Emile Højbjerg
LM	17	Victor Kristiansen		(substituted off) 57'
AM	10	Christian Eriksen		(substituted off) 82'
CF	9	Rasmus Højlund		(substituted off) 67'
CF	19	Jonas Wind		(substituted off) 57'
Substitutions:
MF	14	Mikkel Damsgaard		(substituted on) 57'
DF	18	Alexander Bah		(substituted on) 57'
FW	20	Yussuf Poulsen		(substituted on) 67'
MF	15	Christian Nørgaard	(yellow card) 87'	(substituted on) 82'
FW	11	Andreas Skov Olsen		(substituted on) 82'
Manager:
Kasper Hjulmand

GK	1	Jordan Pickford
RB	2	Kyle Walker
CB	5	John Stones
CB	6	Marc Guéhi
LB	12	Kieran Trippier
CM	8	Trent Alexander-Arnold		(substituted off) 54'
CM	4	Declan Rice
RW	7	Bukayo Saka		(substituted off) 70'
AM	10	Jude Bellingham
LW	11	Phil Foden		(substituted off) 69'
CF	9	Harry Kane (c)		(substituted off) 69'
Substitutions:
MF	16	Conor Gallagher	(yellow card) 61'	(substituted on) 54'
FW	20	Jarrod Bowen		(substituted on) 69'
FW	19	Ollie Watkins		(substituted on) 69'
FW	21	Eberechi Eze		(substituted on) 70'
Manager:
Gareth Southgate

Man of the Match:
Pierre-Emile Højbjerg (Denmark)

Assistant referees:
Paulo Soares (Portugal)
Pedro Ribeiro (Portugal)
Fourth official:
Mykola Balakin (Ukraine)
Reserve assistant referee:
Oleksandr Berkut (Ukraine)
Video assistant referee:
Tiago Martins (Portugal)
Assistant video assistant referees:
Alejandro Hernández Hernández (Spain)
Juan Martínez Munuera (Spain)

=== England vs Slovenia ===
25 June 2024
21:00

England	0–0	Slovenia
	Report

RheinEnergieStadion, Cologne
Attendance: 41,536
Referee: Clément Turpin (France)

England	Slovenia

GK	1	Jordan Pickford
RB	2	Kyle Walker
CB	5	John Stones
CB	6	Marc Guéhi	(yellow card) 68'
LB	12	Kieran Trippier	(yellow card) 17'	(substituted off) 84'
CM	16	Conor Gallagher		(substituted off) 46'
CM	4	Declan Rice
RW	7	Bukayo Saka		(substituted off) 71'
AM	10	Jude Bellingham
LW	11	Phil Foden	(yellow card) 77'	(substituted off) 89'
CF	9	Harry Kane (c)
Substitutions:
MF	26	Kobbie Mainoo		(substituted on) 46'
MF	24	Cole Palmer		(substituted on) 71'
DF	8	Trent Alexander-Arnold		(substituted on) 84'
FW	18	Anthony Gordon		(substituted on) 89'
Manager:
Gareth Southgate

GK	1	Jan Oblak (c)
RB	2	Žan Karničnik
CB	21	Vanja Drkušić
CB	6	Jaka Bijol	(yellow card) 72'
LB	13	Erik Janža	(yellow card) 22'	(substituted off) 90+1'
CM	22	Adam Gnezda Čerin
CM	10	Timi Max Elšnik
RM	20	Petar Stojanović
LM	17	Jan Mlakar		(substituted off) 86'
CF	9	Andraž Šporar		(substituted off) 86'
CF	11	Benjamin Šeško		(substituted off) 75'
Substitutions:
FW	26	Josip Iličić		(substituted on) 75'
MF	5	Jon Gorenc Stanković		(substituted on) 86'
FW	19	Žan Celar		(substituted on) 86'
DF	3	Jure Balkovec		(substituted on) 90+1'
Manager:
Matjaž Kek

Man of the Match:
Adam Gnezda Čerin (Slovenia)

Assistant referees:
Nicolas Danos (France)
Benjamin Pagès (France)
Fourth official:
Halil Umut Meler (Turkey)
Reserve assistant referee:
Mustafa Emre Eyisoy (Turkey)
Video assistant referee:
Jérôme Brisard (France)
Assistant video assistant referees:
Willy Delajod (France)
Rob Dieperink (Netherlands)

=== Denmark vs Serbia ===
25 June 2024
21:00

Denmark	0–0	Serbia
	Report

Allianz Arena, Munich
Attendance: 64,288
Referee: François Letexier (France)

Denmark	Serbia

GK	1	Kasper Schmeichel (c)
CB	2	Joachim Andersen
CB	6	Andreas Christensen
CB	3	Jannik Vestergaard
RM	18	Alexander Bah		(substituted off) 77'
CM	21	Morten Hjulmand	(yellow card) 30'	(substituted off) 77'
CM	23	Pierre-Emile Højbjerg
LM	5	Joakim Mæhle
AM	10	Christian Eriksen		(substituted off) 88'
CF	9	Rasmus Højlund		(substituted off) 59'
CF	19	Jonas Wind	(yellow card) 27'	(substituted off) 46'
Substitutions:
FW	11	Andreas Skov Olsen		(substituted on) 46'
FW	12	Kasper Dolberg		(substituted on) 59'
MF	8	Thomas Delaney		(substituted on) 77'
DF	17	Victor Kristiansen		(substituted on) 77'
FW	20	Yussuf Poulsen		(substituted on) 88'
Manager:
Kasper Hjulmand

GK	1	Predrag Rajković
CB	13	Miloš Veljković
CB	4	Nikola Milenković	(yellow card) 4'
CB	2	Strahinja Pavlović
RM	16	Srđan Mijailović		(substituted off) 73'
CM	17	Ivan Ilić		(substituted off) 67'
CM	6	Nemanja Gudelj		(substituted off) 46'
LM	14	Andrija Živković
AM	19	Lazar Samardžić		(substituted off) 46'
AM	22	Saša Lukić		(substituted off) 87'
CF	9	Aleksandar Mitrović (c)	(yellow card) 83'
Substitutions:
MF	10	Dušan Tadić		(substituted on) 46'
FW	8	Luka Jović		(substituted on) 46'
FW	7	Dušan Vlahović		(substituted on) 67'
DF	25	Filip Mladenović		(substituted on) 73'
MF	20	Sergej Milinković-Savić		(substituted on) 87'
Manager:
Dragan Stojković

Man of the Match:
Christian Eriksen (Denmark)

Assistant referees:
Cyril Mugnier (France)
Mehdi Rahmouni (France)
Fourth official:
Donatas Rumšas (Lithuania)
Reserve assistant referee:
Aleksandr Radiuš (Lithuania)
Video assistant referee:
Bastian Dankert (Germany)
Assistant video assistant referees:
Fedayi San (Switzerland)
Pol van Boekel (Netherlands)

== Discipline ==
Fair play points were used as a tiebreaker between Denmark and Slovenia, as they were tied on their head-to-head and overall results and a penalty shoot-out was not applicable as a tiebreaker. These were calculated based on yellow and red cards received by players and team officials in all group matches as follows:

- yellow card = 1 point
- red card as a result of two yellow cards = 3 points
- direct red card = 3 points
- yellow card followed by direct red card = 4 points

Only one of the above deductions was applied to a player or team official in a single match.

Team	Match 1				Match 2				Match 3				Points
Team	Booked	(yellow card) (yellow-red card)	Sent off (straight red)	(yellow card) (red card)	Booked	(yellow card) (yellow-red card)	Sent off (straight red)	(yellow card) (red card)	Booked	(yellow card) (yellow-red card)	Sent off (straight red)	(yellow card) (red card)	Points
England					1				3				–4
Denmark	1				3				2				–6
Slovenia	3 (Note: Count includes a card from a technical staff member of the team.)				2				2				–7
Serbia	3				4				2				–9

== See also ==
- Denmark at the UEFA European Championship
- England at the UEFA European Championship
- Serbia at the UEFA European Championship
- Slovenia at the UEFA European Championship
