= Kyle Walker =

English footballer (born 1990)

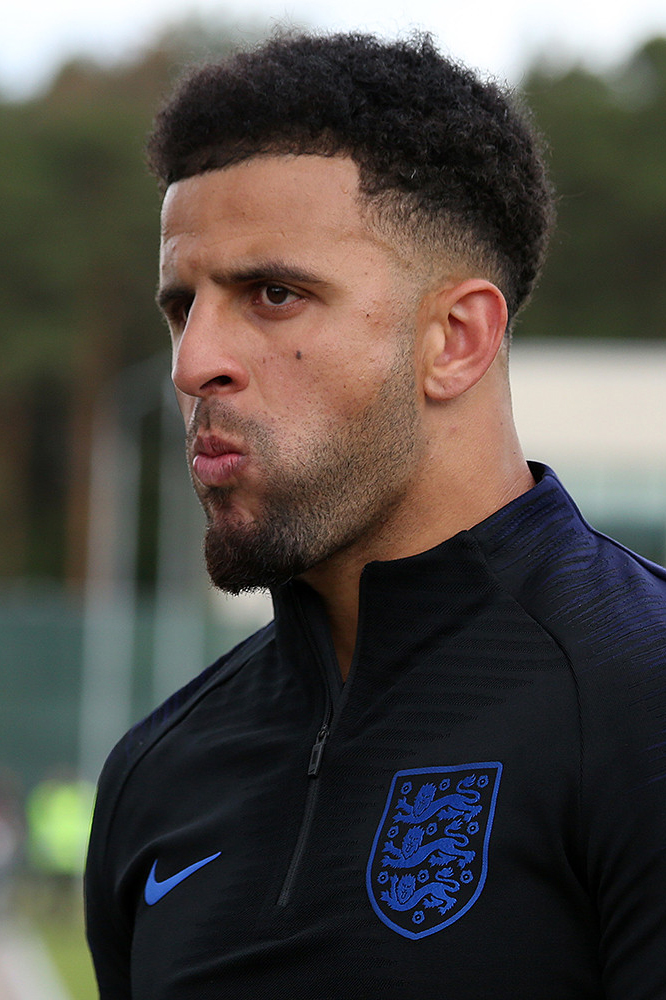
- Walker with England in 2018

Personal information
- Full name: Kyle Andrew Walker
- Date of birth: 28 May 1990 (age 36)
- Place of birth: Sheffield, South Yorkshire, England
- Height: 6 ft 0 in (1.83 m)
- Positions: Right-back; centre-back

Team information
- Current team: Burnley
- Number: 2

Youth career
- 1997–2008: Sheffield United

Senior career*
Years	Team	Apps	(Gls)
2008–2009	Sheffield United	2	(0)
2008	→ Northampton Town (loan)	9	(0)
2009–2017	Tottenham Hotspur	183	(4)
2009–2010	→ Sheffield United (loan)	26	(0)
2010–2011	→ Queens Park Rangers (loan)	20	(0)
2011	→ Aston Villa (loan)	15	(1)
2017–2025	Manchester City	212	(3)
2025	→ AC Milan (loan)	11	(0)
2025–	Burnley	49	(0)

International career
2009	England U19	7	(0)
2010–2011	England U21	7	(0)
2011–2025	England	96	(1)
Medal record
Men's football
Representing England
UEFA European Championship
Runner-up	2020 Europe	Team
Runner-up	2024 Germany	Team
UEFA Nations League
Third place	2019 Portugal	Team
- * Club domestic league appearances and goals as of 09:31, 8 November 2026 (UTC)

Kyle Andrew Walker (born 28 May 1990) is an English professional footballer who plays as a right-back or centre-back for EFL Championship club Burnley. He is widely regarded to be amongst the best full-backs of his generation, and has been described by his former Manchester City manager Pep Guardiola as one of the greatest full-backs in the history of the sport.

Walker started his career at his boyhood club Sheffield United at the age of seven. He made his first-team debut aged 18 after a loan spell at Northampton Town. He impressed whilst playing for United and played in the 2009 Championship play-off final. His performances earned him a move to Premier League club Tottenham Hotspur, before being immediately loaned back to Sheffield United. After further loan spells at Queens Park Rangers and Aston Villa, Walker cemented his place in Tottenham's first team. He was part of the Tottenham team coached by Mauricio Pochettino that finished runner-ups in the 2016–17 Premier League and 2014–15 League Cup.

Walker joined Manchester City in 2017 for a fee of £45 million. Throughout his City career, he was coached by Pep Guardiola. With City, he won six Premier League titles, four EFL Cups, two FA Cups, and a UEFA Champions League in 2023 as part of a continental treble. He has been named in the PFA Team of the Year four times, in the 2011–12, 2016–17, 2017–18, and 2023–24 seasons. He spent the latter half of the 2024–25 season on loan at AC Milan, before moving to Burnley in July 2025 on a permanent deal.

Walker played for England at under-19 and under-21 levels before making his senior debut for the England national team in September 2011. He has represented his country at three UEFA European Championships, in 2016, 2020, and 2024, and at two FIFA World Cups, in 2018 and 2022. He retired from international play in March 2026, racking up a total of 96 international caps for England.

== Early life ==
Kyle Andrew Walker was born on 28 May 1990 in Sheffield, South Yorkshire, and is of Jamaican descent on his father's side. He grew up in the Sharrow area of the city, and attended Porter Croft Infant & Junior School, followed by High Storrs School until 2006.

== Club career ==
=== Sheffield United ===
Walker joined boyhood club Sheffield United at the age of seven after being recommended by coach Paul Archer at Football Unites, Racism Divides. Walker progressed through the ranks to become a regular fixture in the reserve team by 2008. In November 2008, he was allowed to join League One club Northampton Town on a one-month loan to gain first-team experience, making his debut on 15 November in a defeat to Oldham Athletic. His one-month loan was later extended into January 2009, before he returned to United, having played nine matches for Northampton.

Soon after returning to Sheffield United, Walker made his first-team debut for the club on 13 January 2009, starting in a third round FA Cup tie against Leyton Orient. With United losing a number of players to injury in the closing weeks of the season, Walker was included in the starting line-up for the last two matches of the season, making his full league debut for the club on 25 April 2009 against Swansea City. After two performances he retained his place as Sheffield United entered the Championship play-offs, starting both matches against Preston North End and the final against Burnley at the end of May 2009. By playing in the final, Walker became the youngest Sheffield United player ever to play at Wembley Stadium.

=== Tottenham Hotspur ===
==== 2009–2011: Transfer and loans ====
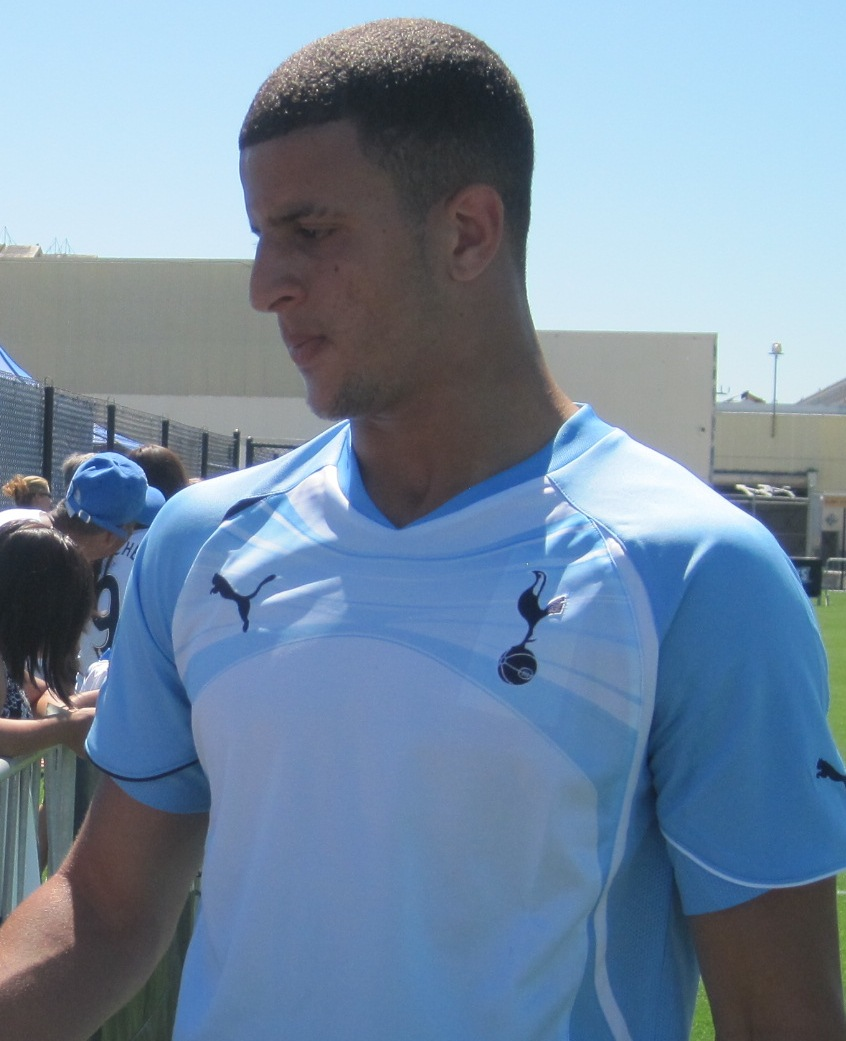
Walker with Tottenham Hotspur in 2010

On 22 July 2009, Walker signed for Premier League club Tottenham Hotspur, along with Sheffield United teammate Kyle Naughton, for a combined fee of £9 million. Walker was loaned back to United for the duration of the 2009–10 season as part of the deal. While at Sheffield United, he was virtually ever-present at right-back for the first half of the season, but was recalled by Tottenham on 1 February 2010, just before the close of the January 2010 transfer window, after Alan Hutton was loaned out to Sunderland. Walker made his debut for Tottenham on 27 March, in a 2–0 victory over Portsmouth and went on to make one more league appearance that season.

At the start of the following season, Walker went out on loan once more signing an initial one-month deal with Queens Park Rangers due to injuries at the club in the right-back position. In mid-October, his loan at QPR was extended until 3 January 2011.

After leaving QPR, Walker joined Premier League club Aston Villa on loan until the end of the 2010–11 season. He scored on his debut only nine minutes into the match against former club Sheffield United in the third round of the FA Cup in January 2011. At the start of February, Walker scored his first Premier League goal and first senior league goal, a 30-yard shot into the bottom left corner of the goal against Fulham. He returned to Tottenham at the end of the 2010–11 season after scoring two goals in 18 appearances for Villa.

==== 2011–2017: Rise to prominence ====
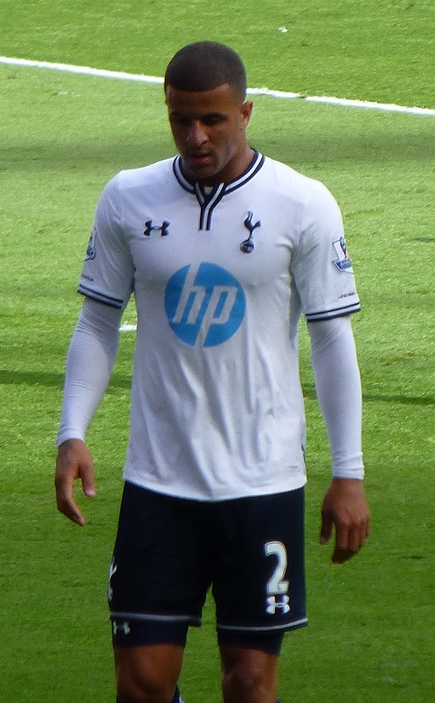
Walker playing for Tottenham Hotspur in 2013

On leaving Villa Park, Walker suggested that he would be happy to return to the club the next season, for his first-team opportunities at Tottenham were limited. However, Tottenham manager Harry Redknapp had already stated that he did not wish to sell Walker. Walker subsequently agreed to a contract extension at Tottenham until 2016. Walker was chosen in the starting eleven for Tottenham's opening match of the 2011–12 season, away to Manchester United on 22 August 2011. On 2 October, he scored the winning goal in the North London derby against Arsenal from 25-yards out. Tottenham won the match 2–1.

On 22 April 2012, Walker was named as the PFA Young Player of the Year, beating the likes of Sergio Agüero, Danny Welbeck, Daniel Sturridge, Alex Oxlade-Chamberlain and teammate Gareth Bale to the award, as well as being named in the PFA Team of the Year. On 3 May 2012, Walker was awarded with a new five-year contract, that ran until 2017.

Walker was ever-present in the first half of the 2012–13 season in the Premier League, with the exception of a 3–0 away victory over Fulham, in which he was an unused substitute. This included playing 90 minutes in the 3–2 win over Manchester United, which was Tottenham's first victory at Old Trafford in 23 years.

On 28 October 2013, Walker signed a new contract with Tottenham, keeping him at the club until June 2019. Walker was part of the Tottenham team that lost 2–0 to Chelsea on 1 March at Wembley Stadium in the 2015 League Cup final. On 20 April 2017, Walker was named at right-back in the PFA Team of the Year for the second time.

=== Manchester City ===
==== 2017–2020: First major silverware ====
On 14 July 2017, Walker signed a five-year contract with Tottenham's Premier League rivals Manchester City, in a transfer reported to be worth an initial £45 million fee, rising to £50 million with add-ons, making it one of the most expensive football transfers. He made his debut on 12 August against Brighton & Hove Albion, with several media outlets labelled him as the best player in the match. However, during Walker's home debut against Everton, he was sent off for two bookable offences. On 25 February, Walker started in the 2018 EFL Cup final against Arsenal, and played the whole 90 minutes, with Manchester City winning 3–0 to obtain their first piece of silverware of the 2017–18 season, and their first trophy overall under Pep Guardiola. Walker also received his first trophy with Manchester City and his first trophy as a Premier League player.

Walker started in the 2019 FA Cup final against Watford on 18 May as City won the first domestic treble in English men's football. Walker signed a new contract with City in June 2019. On 6 November, in a UEFA Champions League away match against Atalanta, Walker volunteered to go in goal for the last 10 minutes after substitute goalkeeper Claudio Bravo was sent off; he did not concede and saved a free-kick as the match ended 1–1.

==== 2020–2022: Consecutive Premier League titles ====
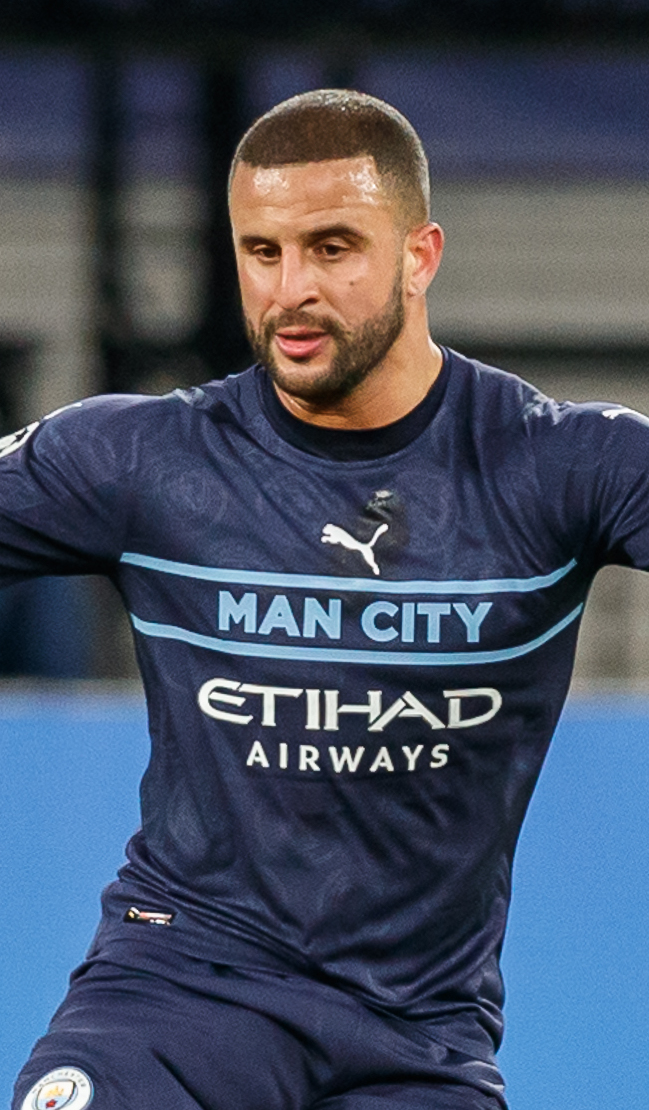
Walker playing for Manchester City in 2021

On 31 October 2020, Walker scored a long-range goal against Sheffield United to mark his 100th league appearance for City. Walker did not celebrate, explaining later that he did not do so as he is a "Sheffield United fan". On 10 February 2021, Walker scored a goal against Swansea City in the fifth round of the 2020–21 FA Cup. City were later knocked out by Chelsea in the semi-finals on 17 April. On 11 May, Walker won the 2020–21 Premier League as contenders Manchester United lost to Leicester City. On 29 May, Walker was in the starting lineup for the 2021 Champions League final, which City lost 1–0 to Chelsea.

On 19 October 2021, Walker scored his first Champions League goal in a 5–1 away win over Club Brugge. City won the 2021–22 Premier League on 22 May 2022 as teammate İlkay Gündoğan scored two goals in a 3–2 home victory against Aston Villa to overturn a two-goal deficit.

==== 2022–2023: Further success and continental treble ====
Walker suffered a groin injury in October which rendered him unable to play for six Premier League games. On 8 January 2023, he assisted Phil Foden for City's second goal in a 4–0 victory against Chelsea in the third round of the 2022–23 FA Cup. In April 2023, Pep Guardiola shifted the tactics of City in the middle of the 2022–23 season, resulting in a decrease of starts and game time for Walker. Questioned on this in a press conference, Guardiola stated that Walker did not in his opinion have "every one of the characteristics" required for a new role in a 3–2–4–1 formation, but also mentioned that he had not "lost faith" in him. During the 2022–23 Champions League season, Walker displayed incredible performances over two legs against Real Madrid in the semi-finals, being praised by analysts especially for nullifying the threat of Vinícius Júnior. The embrace the two players shared enthusiastically after the first leg was cited as an example of good sportsmanship.

On 20 May 2023, Walker won the 2022–23 Premier League after Arsenal lost 1–0 in a defeat to Nottingham Forest. On 3 June, Walker won the FA Cup, beating Manchester United in the final, in which he started and played for 95 minutes. On 7 June, Walker stated that City's treble bid was being driven by the desire to match United's treble in the 1998–99 season, claiming also that the City and Liverpool teams of the present era should be considered as two of the best teams in Premier League history. On 10 June, Walker was benched in the Champions League final against Inter Milan. It was speculated by critics and fans that this omission was because of "a disturbance in his back", a problem which was revealed to the media by Guardiola. However, Guardiola later stated that it was because he needed "another type of player" for his game plan, despite the decision being "really tough". Walker came on as an 82nd-minute substitute in the final, a match which ended in a 1–0 victory, completing City's continental treble. He was selected in the 2022–23 UEFA Champions League team of the tournament. Following the 2022–23 season, Walker was identified as a potential target for Bayern Munich by manager Thomas Tuchel.

==== 2023–2025: Captaincy and departure ====
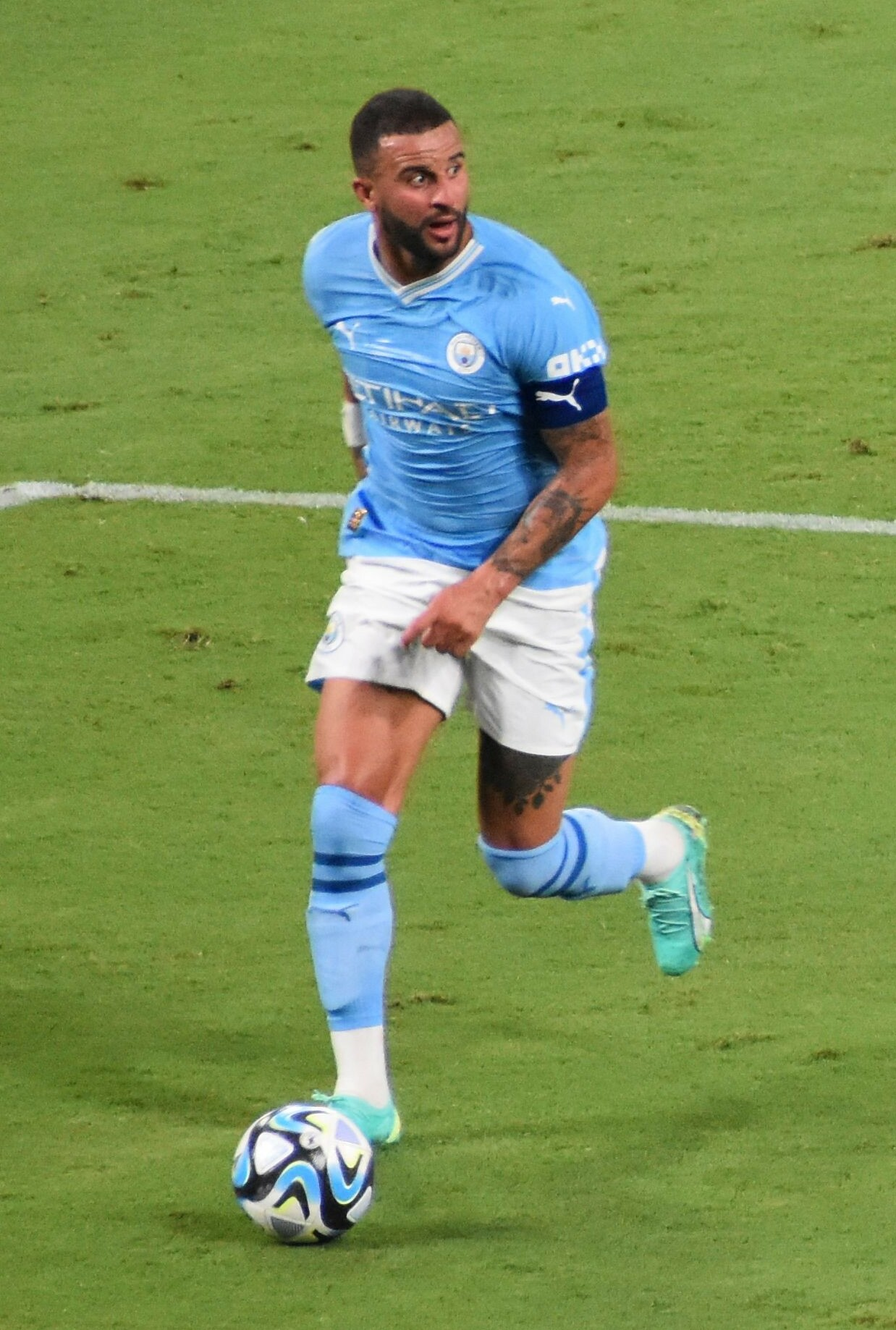
Walker on the ball for Manchester City in 2023

It was initially assumed that Walker had become vice-captain following the departure of captain İlkay Gündoğan to Barcelona, having previously held the role of third captain. It was presumed that the new captain was to be Kevin De Bruyne. On 6 August, with De Bruyne benched, Walker captained the team in the 2023 FA Community Shield, which they lost on penalties to Arsenal. With De Bruyne having been injured on 11 August, Walker captained his club in the 2023 UEFA Super Cup on 16 August, and scored the winning penalty as City beat Sevilla 5–4 on penalties after a 1–1 draw. Walker later stated that he had been reluctant to take the final penalty, proclaiming that if anyone had played with him, they would know that he "[didn't] like taking penalties". On 3 September, Walker stated that he had been close to joining German club Bayern Munich in the summer. On 14 September, Walker signed a two-year contract extension, keeping him at the club until June 2026. Following the return of De Bruyne from injury, it was confirmed that Walker would remain captain permanently. De Bruyne stated: "I'm number two, [Walker] is number one". He captained his side in the 2024 FA Cup final 1–2 defeat to Manchester United on 25 May 2024.

During the latter half of the 2024–25 season, Guardiola revealed that Walker had asked to leave the club with only six months left on his contract.

==== Loan to AC Milan ====
On 24 January 2025, Walker joined Serie A club AC Milan on loan until the end of the 2024–25 season, with an option for a permanent transfer. On 2 February, he made his Milan debut in the Derby della Madonnina against Inter Milan, which ended in a 1–1 draw.

=== Burnley ===
On 5 July 2025, Walker joined newly-promoted Premier League side Burnley on a two-year deal in a move reported to be worth up to £5 million fee if bonuses are achieved. On 16 August, he made his competitive debut in a 3–0 loss to former club Tottenham Hotspur at Tottenham Hotspur Stadium.

== International career ==
=== Youth career ===
Walker made his debut for the England national under-19 team on 10 February 2009, coming on as a 78th-minute substitute in a 3–0 home loss to Spain in a friendly. His first start came on 25 March in another friendly, in which England drew 0–0 at home to the Czech Republic. Walker was part of the England squad at the 2009 UEFA European Under-19 Championship, and played in every match as England went on to lose 2–0 to Ukraine in the final. This was the last of his seven appearances for the under-19s.

Walker's debut for the England national under-21 team came on 3 March 2010 when starting a 2–1 home defeat to Greece in a 2011 UEFA European Under-21 Championship qualification group match. At the end of the 2010–11 season, he was named in the England squad for the 2011 UEFA European Under-21 Championship in Denmark. Walker played in England's three matches at the tournament, and despite them being eliminated in the group stage he was named in the Team of the Tournament. He finished his under-21 career with seven appearances.

=== Senior ===
==== 2011–2020 ====
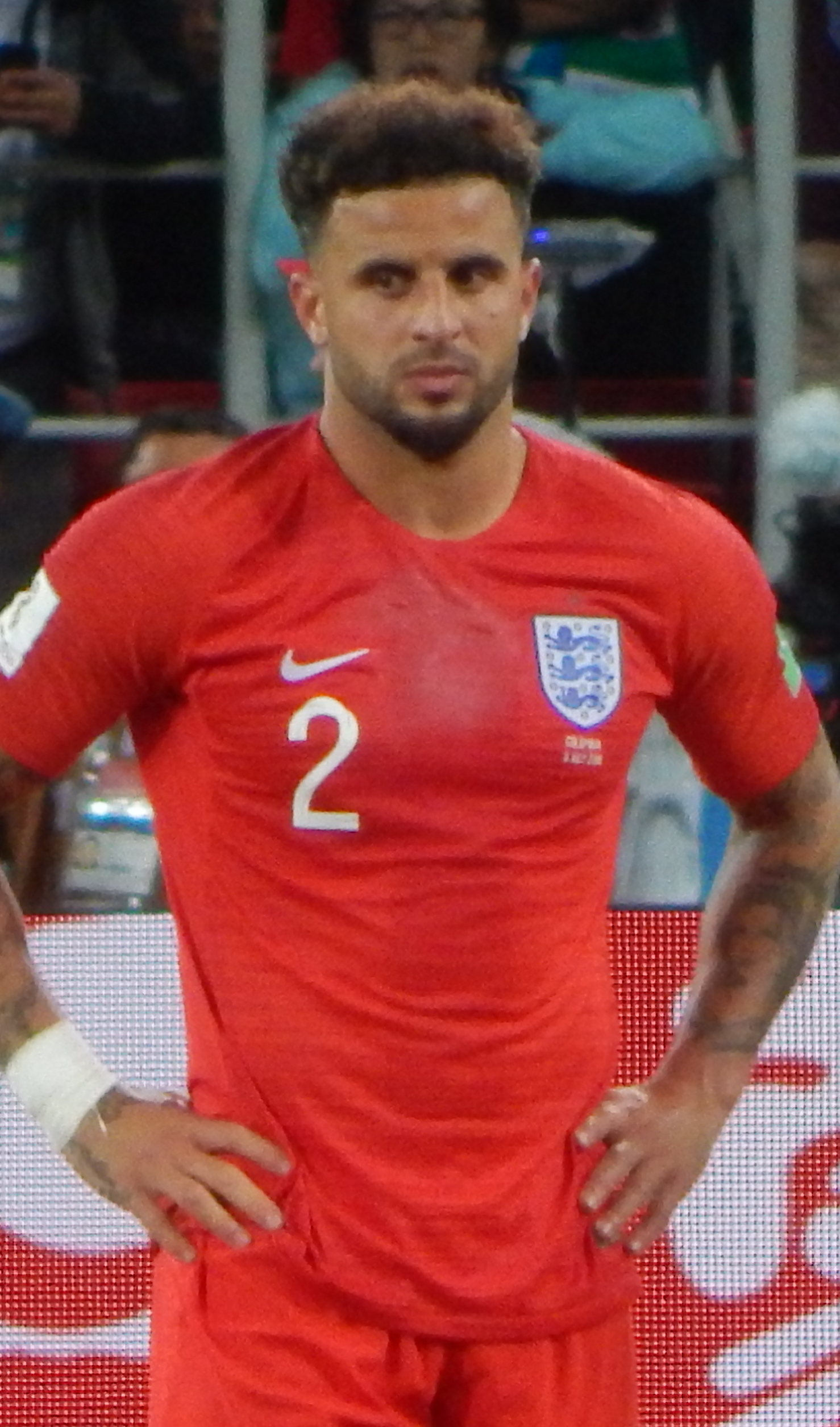
Walker with England at the 2018 FIFA World Cup

Following his first run of regular Premier League starts, Walker was called up to the senior national team in February and March 2011. However, he did not feature in any of the matches played, and pulled out of the squad in March due to an injury. He went on to make his debut in a 1–0 win over Spain, coming on for Scott Parker as a substitute in the 85th minute. He made his first start on 15 November, in a 1–0 win against Sweden, after which he was the man-of-the-match. He missed UEFA Euro 2012 because of a toe injury.

He was named in the England squad for the 2018 FIFA World Cup in Russia. Walker was deployed as a centre-back in a back three by England's manager Gareth Southgate as the team reached the semi-final for the first time since 1990.

In June 2019, Walker scored an own goal against the Netherlands as England went out in the semi-finals of the 2019 UEFA Nations League Finals. On 5 September 2020, he was sent off in a 1–0 away win over Iceland in the 2020–21 Nations League, becoming the first Englishman to get an international red card since Raheem Sterling in June 2014.

==== 2021–2026 ====
On 1 June 2021, Walker was named in the England squad for the rescheduled UEFA Euro 2020. His performances during the tournament earned him a place in the Team of the Tournament as England made it to their first final in a major tournament since 1966.

He was named in the England squad for the 2022 FIFA World Cup in Qatar. On the prospect of facing up against Kylian Mbappé in the quarter-finals, Walker stated that he would "not roll out a red carpet" for him. Despite England's 2–1 loss to France in the match, Walker was praised for winning his individual battle against Mbappé.

On 9 September 2023, Walker scored his first international goal during a 1–1 draw against Ukraine in a UEFA Euro 2024 qualifying match. On 20 November, in a 1–1 draw with North Macedonia, Walker captained England for the first time, becoming the 126th player to do so.

He was named in England's 26-man squad for UEFA Euro 2024 in Germany. On 14 June 2024, Walker was named as England's vice-captain at the tournament. He started at right-back in the team's opening match of the tournament, playing the full 90 minutes of the 1–0 win over Serbia in Gelsenkirchen. In the second Group C match against Denmark, he set up Harry Kane's opening goal in the 18th minute with a deflected cross from the right wing. In the round of 16 match against Slovakia, Walker's long throw-in was flicked on by Ivan Toney for Jude Bellingham's equalising goal in the 95th minute. He ended the match wearing the captain's armband after Kane was withdrawn at half-time of extra time.

On 10 March 2026, Walker announced his retirement from international football, with 96 caps in total.

== Style of play ==
Walker is well known for his speed and has been identified by players such as Neymar and former Chelsea winger Eden Hazard as one of the “toughest opponents they have ever faced”. Some consider him to be instrumental to Manchester City's modern success, being praised by both current and former teammates as one of the “best and most accomplished” full-backs in the world. He is considered a strong and physical defender who is comfortable in one-on-one situations and making tackles and interceptions.

In addition to his defensive qualities, Walker is also an attacking full-back who is capable of making overlapping runs and delivering crosses into the box. His prominent speed and stamina allows him to contribute in both attack and defence, and he is often seen covering large areas of the pitch in games.

== Media career ==
In May 2026, Walker joined The Sun as a columnist and pundit for its coverage of the 2026 FIFA World Cup.

== Personal life ==
Walker married childhood sweetheart Annie Kilner in 2022 at Mottram Hall, after a 12-year relationship. They lived with their four children in a £3.6 million home in Cheshire. They welcomed a fifth child in June 2026.

Walker also fathered two children with Lauryn Goodman. After the news of his affair with Goodman broke, Walker publicly apologised to Kilner, stating that he had made "idiot choices" and needed to "own up to my mistakes". Kilner filed for divorce on 16 October 2024.

In 2024 Walker was involved in a financial provision case brought by Goodman just two days after the birth of her second child. The judgement was made public after Judge Hess ruled that confidentiality would be inappropriate due to Goodman's active engagement with the media.

On 5 April 2020, Manchester City began a disciplinary procedure against Walker after it was reported that he had broken national lockdown rules and invited two prostitutes to his home amid the COVID-19 pandemic. On 7 May, it was again reported that he had broken lockdown rules by travelling to Sheffield to give a present to his sister and hugging her. He later admitted that he also visited his parents to pick up food. The club said they would not discipline him for this, citing the trips being for personal reasons. He later tweeted that he felt he and his family were being harassed and that the reports were affecting the mental health of his whole family.

In March 2023, it was reported that Walker exposed himself to a woman in a Manchester bar. It was later reported that Walker would not face criminal charges for his behaviour.

== Career statistics ==
=== Club ===
As of match played 7 November 2026

Appearances and goals by club, season and competition
Club	Season	League			National cup (Note: Includes FA Cup, Coppa Italia)		League cup (Note: Includes EFL Cup)		Europe		Other		Total	
Club	Season	Division	Apps	Goals	Apps	Goals	Apps	Goals	Apps	Goals	Apps	Goals	Apps	Goals
Sheffield United	2008–09	Championship	2	0	2	0	0	0	—		3 (Note: Appearances in Championship play-offs)	0	7	0
Northampton Town (loan)	2008–09	League One	9	0	—		—		—		—		9	0
Tottenham Hotspur	2009–10	Premier League	2	0	—		—		—		—		2	0
Tottenham Hotspur	2010–11	Premier League	1	0	—		—		0	0	—		1	0
Tottenham Hotspur	2011–12	Premier League	37	2	5	0	0	0	5 (Note: Appearances in UEFA Europa League)	0	—		47	2
Tottenham Hotspur	2012–13	Premier League	36	0	1	0	2	0	11	0	—		50	0
Tottenham Hotspur	2013–14	Premier League	26	1	1	0	3	0	4	0	—		34	1
Tottenham Hotspur	2014–15	Premier League	15	0	0	0	3	0	3	0	—		21	0
Tottenham Hotspur	2015–16	Premier League	33	1	2	0	0	0	0	0	—		35	1
Tottenham Hotspur	2016–17	Premier League	33	0	1	0	0	0	5 (Note: Three appearances in UEFA Champions League, two appearances in UEFA Europa League)	0	—		39	0
Tottenham Hotspur	Total		183	4	10	0	8	0	28	0	—		229	4
Sheffield United (loan)	2009–10	Championship	26	0	2	0	—		—		—		28	0
Queens Park Rangers (loan)	2010–11	Championship	20	0	—		—		—		—		20	0
Aston Villa (loan)	2010–11	Premier League	15	1	3	1	—		—		—		18	2
Manchester City	2017–18	Premier League	32	0	3	0	6	0	7 (Note: Appearances in UEFA Champions League)	0	—		48	0
Manchester City	2018–19	Premier League	33	1	5	0	3	1	10	0	1 (Note: Appearance in FA Community Shield)	0	52	2
Manchester City	2019–20	Premier League	29	1	2	0	4	0	6	0	1	0	42	1
Manchester City	2020–21	Premier League	24	1	3	1	4	0	11	0	—		42	2
Manchester City	2021–22	Premier League	20	0	3	0	1	0	7	1	0	0	31	1
Manchester City	2022–23	Premier League	27	0	5	0	1	0	5	0	1	0	39	0
Manchester City	2023–24	Premier League	32	0	5	0	0	0	6	0	4 (Note: One appearance in FA Community Shield, one appearance in UEFA Super Cup, two appearances in FIFA Club World Cup)	0	47	0
Manchester City	2024–25	Premier League	15	0	0	0	1	0	2	0	0	0	18	0
Manchester City	Total		212	3	26	1	20	1	54	1	7	0	319	6
AC Milan (loan)	2024–25	Serie A	11	0	3	0	—		2	0	—		16	0
Burnley	2025–26	Premier League	36	0	0	0	0	0	—		—		36	0
Burnley	2026–27	Championship	13	0	0	0	2	0	—		—		15	0
Burnley	Total		49	0	0	0	2	0	—		—		51	0
Career total			527	8	46	2	30	1	84	1	10	0	697	12

=== International ===
Appearances and goals by national team and year
National team	Year	Apps	Goals
England	2011	2	0
England	2012	2	0
England	2013	6	0
England	2014	0	0
England	2015	3	0
England	2016	10	0
England	2017	9	0
England	2018	12	0
England	2019	4	0
England	2020	5	0
England	2021	12	0
England	2022	8	0
England	2023	8	1
England	2024	12	0
England	2025	3	0
Total		96	1

England score listed first, score column indicates score after each Walker goal

List of international goals scored by Kyle Walker
No.	Date	Venue	Cap	Opponent	Score	Result	Competition	Ref.
1	9 September 2023	Wrocław Stadium, Wrocław, Poland	77	Ukraine	1–1	1–1	UEFA Euro 2024 qualifying	

== Honours ==
Queens Park Rangers

- Football League Championship: 2010–11

Tottenham Hotspur

- Football League Cup runner-up: 2014–15

Manchester City

- Premier League: 2017–18, 2018–19, 2020–21, 2021–22, 2022–23, 2023–24
- FA Cup: 2018–19, 2022–23; runner-up: 2023–24
- EFL Cup: 2017–18, 2018–19, 2019–20, 2020–21
- FA Community Shield: 2018, 2019
- UEFA Champions League: 2022–23; runner-up: 2020–21
- UEFA Super Cup: 2023
- FIFA Club World Cup: 2023

England U19

- UEFA European Under-19 Championship runner-up: 2009

England

- UEFA European Championship runner-up: 2020, 2024
- UEFA Nations League third place: 2018–19

Individual

- UEFA European Under-21 Championship Team of the Tournament: 2011
- PFA Young Player of the Year: 2011–12
- PFA Team of the Year: 2011–12 Premier League, 2016–17 Premier League, 2017–18 Premier League, 2023–24 Premier League
- Sports Illustrated Premier League Team of the Decade: 2010–2019
- UEFA European Championship Team of the Tournament: 2020, 2024
- UEFA Champions League Team of the Season: 2022–23
- FIFA Club World Cup Silver Ball: 2023
- FIFPRO World 11: 2023
