= Bukayo Saka =

English footballer (born 2001)

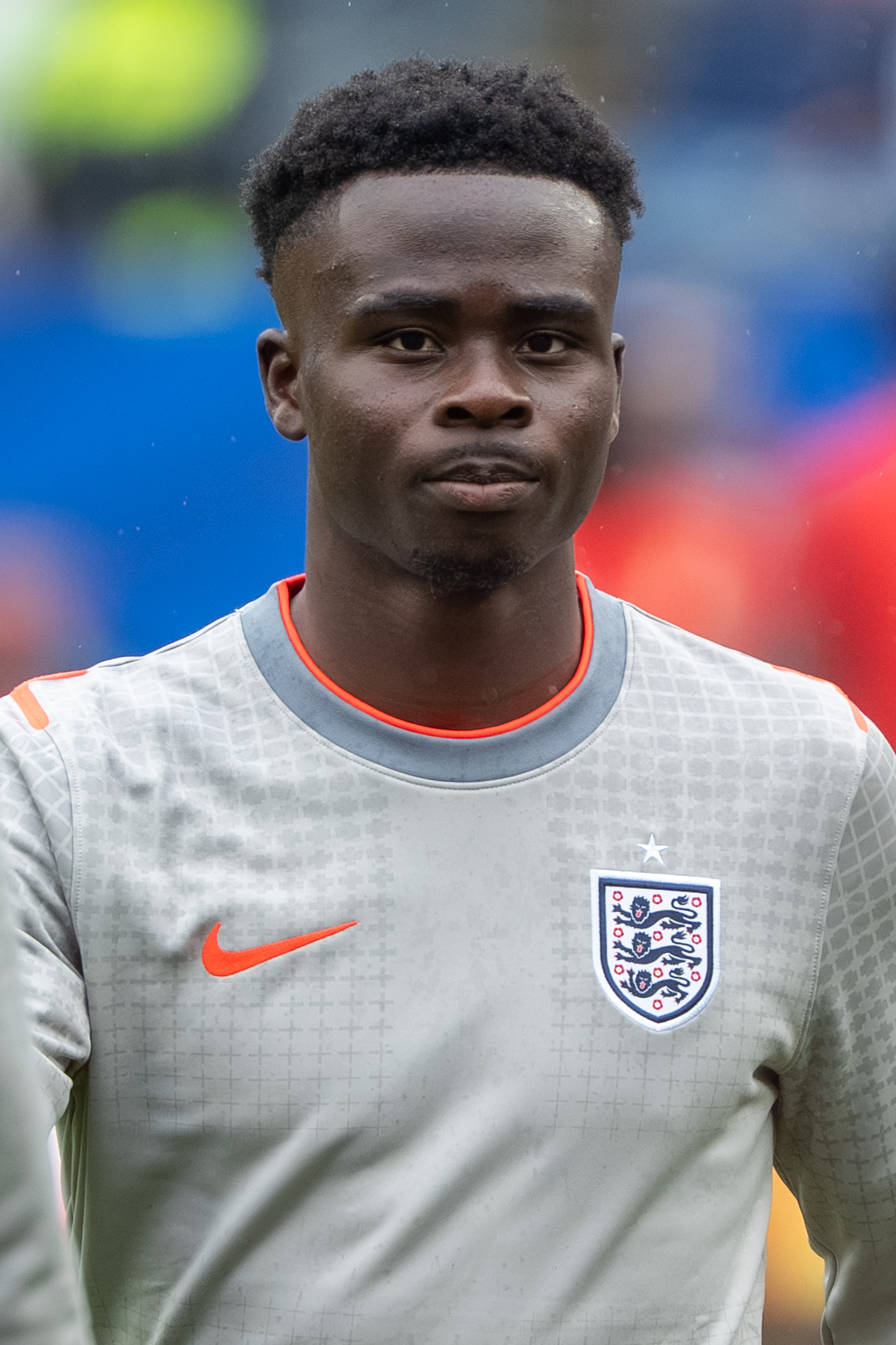
- Saka with England in 2026

Personal information
- Full name: Bukayo Ayoyinka Temidayo Moses Saka
- Date of birth: 5 September 2001 (age 25)
- Place of birth: Ealing, London, England
- Height: 5 ft 10 in (1.78 m)
- Position: Right winger

Team information
- Current team: Arsenal
- Number: 7

Youth career
- Greenford Celtic
- Watford
- 2008–2018: Arsenal

Senior career*
Years	Team	Apps	(Gls)
2018–	Arsenal	233	(63)

International career^{‡}
2016–2017	England U16	6	(1)
2017–2018	England U17	9	(1)
2018	England U18	5	(1)
2018–2019	England U19	10	(4)
2020	England U21	1	(0)
2020–	England	59	(19)
Medal record
Men's football
Representing England
FIFA World Cup
Third place	2026 Canada–Mexico–US
UEFA European Championship
Runner-up	2020 Europe
Runner-up	2024 Germany
- * Club domestic league appearances and goals as of 17:50, 18 October 2026 (UTC) ‡ National team caps and goals as of 18:00, 3 October 2026 (UTC)

Bukayo Ayoyinka Temidayo Moses Saka (born 5 September 2001) is an English professional footballer who plays as a right winger for Premier League club Arsenal and the England national team.

Saka has spent the entirety of his first-team club career with Arsenal, where he has won the Premier League, an FA Cup and three FA Community Shields, progressively becoming one of Arsenal's most influential players. Following both the 2020–21 and 2021–22 seasons, he was named as Arsenal's Player of the Season.

Saka represented England at various youth levels before making his debut for the senior team in October 2020. He was part of England's squads for UEFA Euro 2020 and UEFA Euro 2024, both in which England finished as runners-up, and the 2022 FIFA World Cup and the 2026 FIFA World Cup, the latter in which they finished third.

== Early life and education ==
Bukayo Ayoyinka Temidayo Moses Saka was born on 5 September 2001 in Ealing, London, to Yoruba Nigerian parents, Adenike and Yomi Saka, the younger of two children. His parents emigrated to London from Nigeria as economic migrants. He attended Edward Betham Church of England Primary School before Greenford High School, where he gained high grades in his GCSEs, achieving four A*s and three As. In an interview, Saka stated the importance of his father, Yomi, in his footballing career: "He's a massive inspiration for me. From when I was young, he always kept me grounded, kept me humble."

Prior to joining Arsenal's academy, Saka played youth football for local club Greenford Celtic where he played against Michael Olise's grassroots football team.

== Club career ==
=== Early career ===
Having previously played for youth teams of Watford, Saka joined Arsenal's Hale End academy at the age of seven.

In 2020, the Arsenal U16 coach Trevor Bumstead said: "Bukayo always stood out in the younger teams. He was a fantastic decisionmaker. He knew when to beat people and when to pass, as well as having brilliant physical attributes and really good character and personality." Once he turned 17 years old, Saka signed a professional contract with Arsenal and was promoted to the under-23 team.

On 29 November 2018, Saka made his first-team debut for Arsenal in their UEFA Europa League match against Vorskla Poltava, coming on as a 68th-minute substitute for Aaron Ramsey. On 13 December, Saka made his first full home debut for Arsenal in their Europa League match against Qarabağ. On 1 January 2019, Saka made his debut in the Premier League in a 4–1 win against Fulham after coming on for Alex Iwobi in the 83rd minute. He became the first player born in 2001 to play in a Premier League match. He was an unused substitute in the 2019 UEFA Europa League final 4–1 defeat against Chelsea on 29 May, receiving a runners-up medal.

=== 2019–2020: Breakthrough and FA Cup win ===
Saka scored his first goal on 19 September, curling a fine effort from long range into the corner away to German team Eintracht Frankfurt in the Europa League. He finished the match with two assists also to his name in a 3–0 win. Saka was rewarded for his efforts in Germany with his first Premier League start, in a 3–2 home win over Aston Villa. He then registered an assist for Pierre-Emerick Aubameyang, setting up Arsenal's equaliser in a 1–1 draw at Old Trafford against Manchester United.

Following injuries to Sead Kolašinac and Kieran Tierney, Saka began to establish himself as a regular in the Arsenal first team at left-back. On 27 January 2020, he scored the opening goal in Arsenal's 2–1 FA Cup fourth-round victory at AFC Bournemouth after finishing a 22-pass move. He also assisted the second goal, which was scored by Eddie Nketiah. The goal was later voted goal of the round by BBC Sport. After a two-week mid-season break, Saka marked his return to action at home to Newcastle United with an assist for Nicolas Pépé's goal. He then set up Alexandre Lacazette for his ninth assist of the season in a 1–0 win away to Olympiacos in the Europa League. He then hit double figures for assists that season after crossing in for Nketiah in a thrilling 3–2 home win against Everton.

On 1 July 2020, Saka signed a new long-term contract with Arsenal. Head coach Mikel Arteta praised Saka and said: "I think he represents every value that this football club stands for. He has come through the academy, and earned his respect with hard work and accountability and you can see the progression that he is having as a player but as well as a person." On 4 July 2020, he scored his first Premier League goal for the club against Wolverhampton Wanderers, with a half volley beating goalkeeper Rui Patrício, in a 2–0 win. He was an unused substitute as Arsenal beat Chelsea 2–1 to win their 14th FA Cup. He came third in the vote for the Arsenal Player of the Season award in the 2019–20 season.

=== 2020–2022: Back-to-back Arsenal Player of the Season ===
On 29 August 2020, Saka was in the starting line-up and registered an assist for Pierre-Emerick Aubameyang in the 2020 FA Community Shield, in which 2019–20 FA Cup winners Arsenal clinched a 5–4 penalty shoot-out victory over Premier League champions Liverpool, after the match finished 1–1 after 90 minutes. Saka opened his account for the 2020–21 season on 4 October, scoring in a 2–1 victory against Sheffield United at the Emirates Stadium. On 8 November, Saka turned in Matt Targett's cross and scored an own goal in a 3–0 home defeat against Aston Villa.

On 26 December 2020, Saka scored on his 40th Premier League appearance for Arsenal in a 3–1 home win over Chelsea. Due to his performances in December 2020, he later voted as the Arsenal Player of the Month. He was voted as the Player of the Month again in January 2021, having scored three goals and one assist. His goal against West Bromwich Albion was voted as the runner-up of Arsenal's Goal of the Month. Saka was named Player of the Month for the third time in February after contributing one goal and two assists.

On 6 March 2021, Saka made his 50th Premier League appearance for Arsenal in a 1–1 away draw at Burnley; he is the second youngest player in club history to reach that milestone. On 15 April, Saka scored a goal and helped Arsenal to a 4–0 victory over Slavia Prague in the quarter-final of the Europa League. After his fine performance, he was named as the Europa League Player of the Week. He finished the season with seven goals and seven assists in 46 appearances across all competitions, as he was voted Arsenal Player of the Season, having come in third the previous campaign. He was also named in the shortlist for the PFA Young Player of the Season, eventually won by Manchester City's Phil Foden.

Saka scored his first goal of the new campaign in a 6–0 EFL Cup second-round win away to West Bromwich Albion at The Hawthorns in late August. He scored his first Premier League goal of the season in September against Tottenham Hotspur at the Emirates Stadium, whilst also providing an assist for Emile Smith Rowe's goal in a 3–1 win. On 30 October, Saka made his 100th appearance for Arsenal, marking the occasion with an assist in a 2–0 away win at Leicester City. On 26 December, Saka scored his first brace as Arsenal beat Norwich City 5–0 at Carrow Road. In doing so, Saka became the second youngest player, after Nicolas Anelka, to score 10 Premier League goals for Arsenal.

On 19 March 2022, Saka scored Arsenal's 2000th Premier League goal in history, as the Gunners defeated Aston Villa 1–0 away at Villa Park. As a result of his performances during March 2022, which included two goals and an assist, Saka was nominated for the Premier League Player of the Month award. He scored his tenth Premier League goal of the season (for the first time in his career) on 20 April, in a 4–2 away victory against Chelsea.

Arsenal finished fifth in the Premier League, falling short of UEFA Champions League qualification for the following season. After finishing the season as the club's top scorer, he was nominated for the Premier League Player of the Season, Premier League Young Player of the Season and PFA Young Player of the Year. Saka was named Arsenal's Player of the Season for a second consecutive season, becoming the first person to retain the award since Thierry Henry won in 2003 and again in 2004.

=== 2022–2026: Title challengers and eventual champions ===
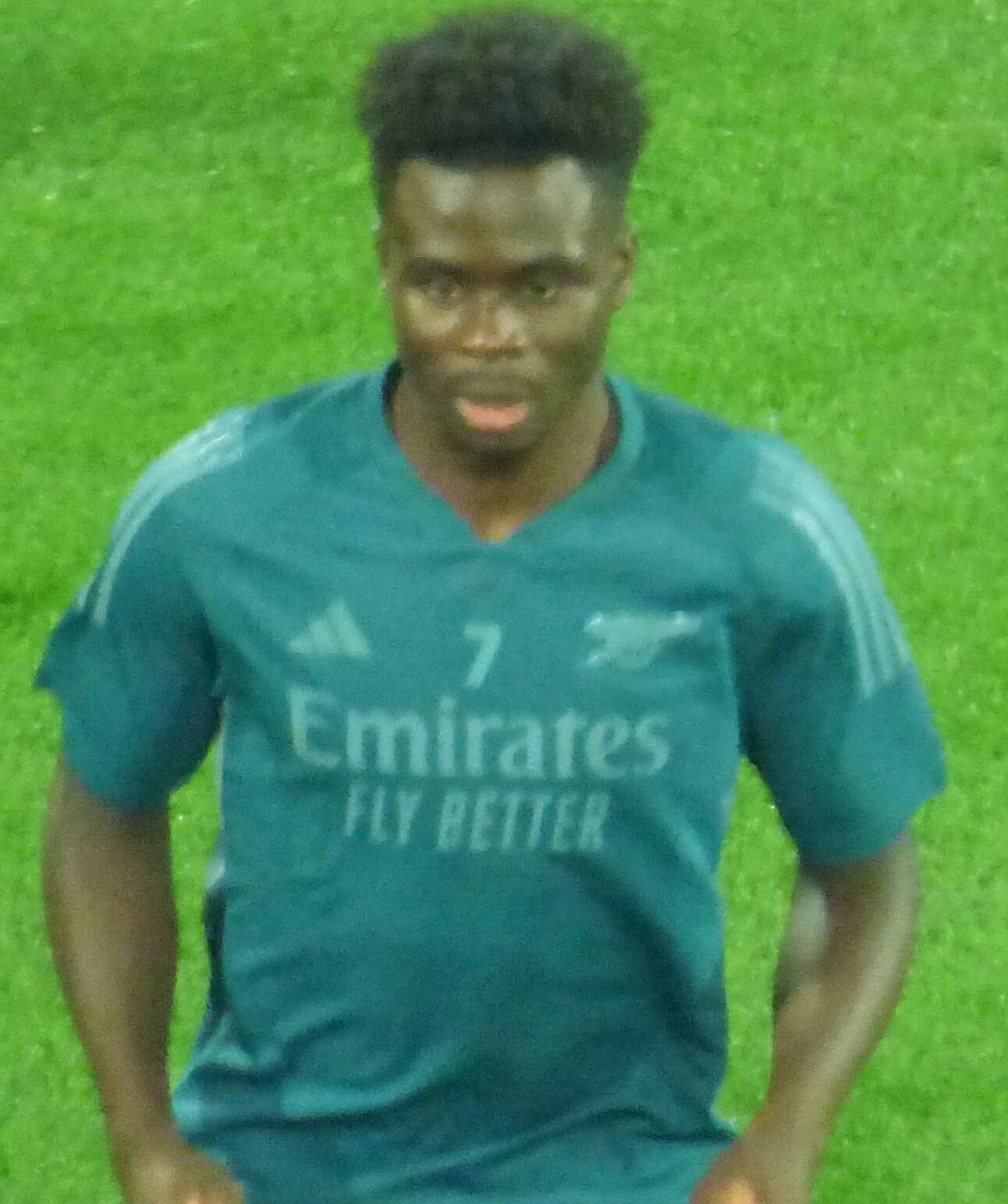
Saka with Arsenal in 2023

Saka played a pivotal role for Arsenal during the 2022–23 season, scoring crucial goals and providing assists as Arsenal aimed to win their first Premier League title since 2003–04. On 20 August 2022, he made his 100th Premier League appearance in a 3–0 win at Bournemouth, becoming the second youngest Arsenal player to reach that milestone. He scored first goal of the season in a 3–1 away defeat against Manchester United on 4 September. In their next Premier League match on 18 September, Saka would provide two assists for teammates William Saliba and Fábio Vieira in a 3–0 away victory at Brentford, a result that would sent Arsenal to the top of the table. In October, Saka would score in three consecutive matches for the first time in his career, with a brace against Liverpool on 9 October, and goals against Bodø/Glimt in the Europa League and Leeds United in the Premier League on 13 October and 16 October, respectively.

On 26 December 2022, Saka scored the equaliser in Arsenal's first match since the conclusion of the World Cup, a 3–1 win over West Ham United. He scored again in their next match against Brighton & Hove Albion, a 4–2 away victory. On 15 January 2023, Saka provided the assist for Martin Ødegaard's goal against Tottenham Hotspur as Arsenal sealed their first away league win against their rivals since 2014. A week later on 22 January, Saka scored from long-range in an eventual 3–2 home win over Manchester United. This goal was later voted as Arsenal's Goal of the Month for January 2023.

On 13 March 2023, Saka received the Men's Young Player of the Year award at the 2023 London Football Awards. He was then awarded the Premier League Player of the Month award for March 2023. On 23 May, Saka signed a long-term contract with Arsenal, committing him to the club until 2027. At the end of the season, he was nominated for the Premier League Player of the Season, Premier League Young Player of the Season, and FWA Footballer of the Year awards. Saka was named the PFA Young Player of the Year for the 2022–23 season.

On 12 August 2023, Saka's goal helped seal a 2–1 win over Nottingham Forest in Arsenal's first match of the 2023–24 season. On 26 August, Saka made his 83rd consecutive Premier League appearance for Arsenal against Fulham, which set a club record. On 20 September, he scored his first Champions League goal and provided an assist in a 4–0 win over PSV on his debut in the competition. On 28 October, Saka captained Arsenal for the first time in a 5–0 home win against Sheffield United. He made his 200th appearance for the club on 5 December 2023 in a 4–3 win over Luton Town at Kenilworth Road, becoming the fourth youngest Arsenal player to reach the milestone. On 11 February 2024, Saka surpassed 50 goals for Arsenal with a brace in a 6–0 away win over West Ham, becoming the youngest Arsenal player to do so in the Premier League.

On 4 October 2025, Saka made his 200th Premier League appearance for Arsenal in a 2–0 win over West Ham United, scoring a penalty — his 55th league goal and 100th goal involvement for the club in the competition. On 19 February 2026, he signed a new long-term contract with the club, reportedly until 2031. On 4 March 2026, he made his 300th appearance for Arsenal, scoring the winner in a 1–0 victory away to Brighton & Hove Albion. Later that year, on 5 May, he netted the goal in a 1–0 victory over Atlético Madrid in the Champions League semi-final second leg, securing his club's place in their first final for 20 years by winning 2–1 on aggregate. A few weeks later, on 18 May, he registered his 50th league assist from a corner in a 1–0 victory over Burnley, becoming the third player in the club's history to reach that milestone of goals and assists after Thierry Henry and Dennis Bergkamp. On the following day, Saka won his first Premier League title after Manchester City failed to beat Bournemouth, handing Arsenal their first Premier League title in 22 years.

== International career ==
=== Youth ===
Saka made his debut for the England national under-16 team on 24 August 2016 as a substitute in a 3–1 away win over Romania in a friendly. He made his first start two days later in a 2–1 defeat to the same opposition in another friendly, in which he scored. Saka was part of the squad for the 2017 UEFA Under-16 Development Tournament, making two appearances as England finished the tournament as runners-up. He finished his under-16 career with six appearances and one goal from 2016 to 2017.

His first involvement with the England under-17 team came in the 2017 FA International Tournament, making his debut on 18 August 2017 in their opening match, a 3–2 home win over Turkey, in which he scored. Saka made one more appearance at the tournament, which England finished as runners-up. He was part of the team for the 2018 Torneio Internacional do Algarve, making two appearances as England ranked in third place. Saka was named in the team for the 2018 UEFA European Under-17 Championship in England, and appeared in all five of the team's matches at the tournament. England were eliminated 6–5 on a penalty shoot-out by the Netherlands in the semi-final after a 0–0 extra-time draw, although Saka scored his penalty kick in the shoot-out. He made nine appearances for the under-17s, scoring once, from 2017 to 2018.

Saka was part of the England under-18 team for the 2018 Limoges Tournament in France, making his debut in England's opening match, a 3–0 win over the Netherlands on 5 September 2018. He scored the winning goal with a penalty in England's 2–1 win over France on 9 September, which saw England win the tournament. England won their three matches at the tournament, with Saka appearing in each match. He went on to finish his under-18 career with one goal from five appearances, all of which came in 2018.

On 14 November 2018, Saka scored on his debut for the England under-19 team in a 4–0 win over Moldova in a 2019 UEFA European Under-19 Championship first qualifying round match in Turkey, which he entered as an 82nd-minute substitute. He made his first start at this level on 20 March 2019, in a 4–1 home win over the Czech Republic in a 2019 European Under-19 Championship elite qualifying round match. Saka scored twice in the match, in the 11th and 56th minute. He made 10 appearances for the under-19s, scoring four goals, from 2018 to 2019.

=== Senior ===
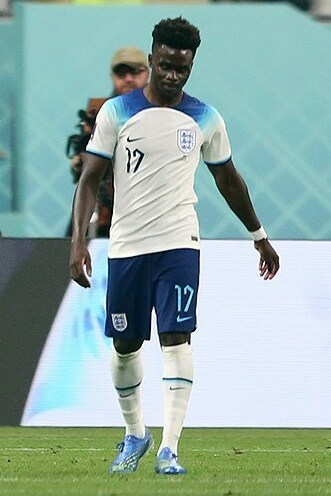
Saka playing for England at the 2022 FIFA World Cup

On 4 September 2020, Saka made his only appearance for the England under-21 team when starting a 6–0 victory away to Kosovo in 2021 UEFA European Under-21 Championship qualification. On 1 October, Saka was called up to the England senior squad for the first time, and made his international debut as one of the starters in a 3–0 victory over Wales. Having played four times for England, Saka is now tied to England internationally and can no longer represent Nigeria.

Saka was named in the 26-man squad for UEFA Euro 2020. On 2 June, in a friendly against Austria, Saka scored his first senior international goal, the only goal in a 1–0 win. He started in England's third Euro 2020 group stage match on 22 June against the Czech Republic, and was named the man of the match. On 11 July, in the tournament final against Italy, Saka was brought on as a substitute for Kieran Trippier. Following extra time, Saka was chosen to take the team's fifth penalty during the subsequent penalty shoot-out, which was his first penalty kick at senior level. Saka's effort was saved by goalkeeper Gianluigi Donnarumma and, as a result, Italy won the shoot-out and the tournament. Saka faced racist abuse online after missing the penalty. On 15 July, Saka said that he "knew instantly the kind of hate" he was going to receive after his penalty was saved, adding: "... and that is a sad reality that your powerful platforms are not doing enough to stop these messages".

On 23 September 2022, Saka was named England Men's Player of the Year for the 2021–22 season ahead of Declan Rice and Harry Kane, becoming the first Arsenal player to win the honour. Saka was named in England's 26-man squad for the 2022 FIFA World Cup in Qatar. He scored twice in a 6–2 victory over Iran in England's opening match at the tournament and once in England's 3–0 defeat of Senegal in the round of 16. On 10 December, Saka started in England's 2–1 quarter-final defeat to France, and was named the team's man of the match by BBC Sport and L'Équipe. On 19 June 2023, he scored his first career hat-trick in a 7–0 home win over North Macedonia in Euro 2024 qualifying.

On 5 September 2023, Saka was named England Men's Player of the Year for a second successive season having scored seven goals in ten internationals during the 2022–23 season. In June 2024, Saka was named in England's 26-man squad for UEFA Euro 2024. In the team's opening match against Serbia, he started on the right of the attack and provided the cross for Jude Bellingham goal to give England a 1–0 win that put them top of Group C. In the quarter-final match against Switzerland, he was awarded player of the match, scoring the equaliser in a 1–1 draw and also scoring in the subsequent penalty shootout victory.

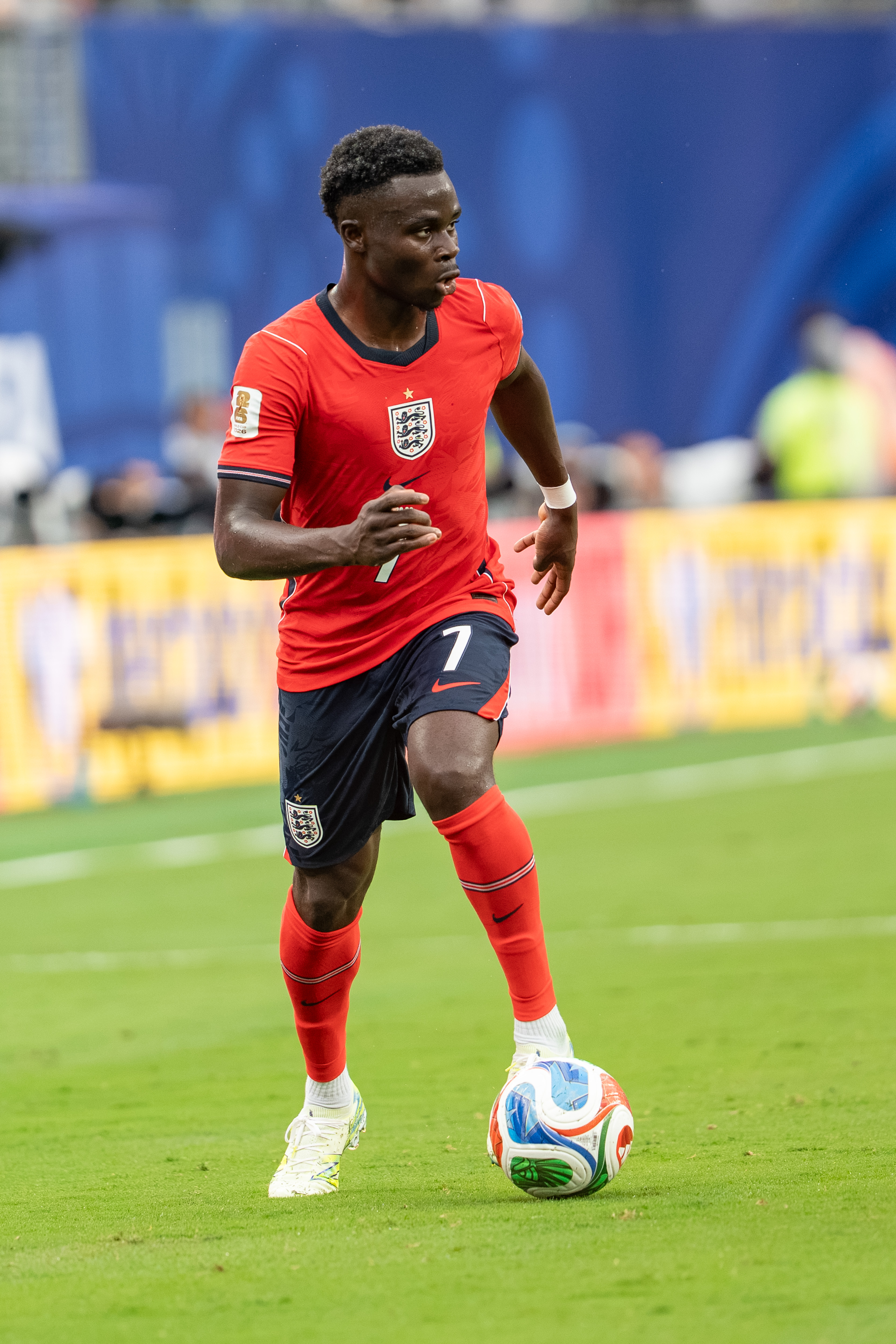
Saka playing for England at the 2026 FIFA World Cup

On 22 May 2026, Saka was selected in the 26-man squad for the 2026 FIFA World Cup. On 17 June, Saka made his first appearance off the bench in England's opening match against Croatia, assisting the fourth goal by Marcus Rashford in England's 4–2 victory. He made his first start of the tournament in England's final group stage game against Panama, where he assisted Jude Bellingham's opener in their 2–0 win. In England's Round of 16 game against Mexico, Saka once again assisted Jude Bellingham's opener in England's 3–2 win, becoming just the third player to provide three assists in a single World Cup for England, after David Beckham and Harry Kane. On 18 July, during the 3rd place play-off between against France, Saka scored a hat-trick to secure England's third place finish in a 6–4 win, becoming just the fourth player to do so for England at the World Cup, following Geoff Hurst, Gary Lineker, and Harry Kane.

== Player profile ==
=== Style of play ===
Saka is known for his dribbling, creativity and goalscoring ability. Predominantly a right winger, Saka can use his pace and strength to beat defenders. Naturally left-footed, he is known for cutting inside to score long-range, curled efforts, or delivering crosses. Despite primarily playing on the right, Saka has demonstrated versatility, featuring as a left winger, left wing-back, and even left-back throughout his Arsenal and England career.

He has drawn comparisons to Arjen Robben, with former Premier League defender Glen Johnson highlighting his pace, goal threat, and work rate. Saka's favourite footballer is Thierry Henry and he cites Alexis Sánchez as an influence, saying he even tried to copy Sánchez's boots when he was an academy player. Among past teammates, Saka said David Luiz helped him the most in his career, saying "he went out of his way" to help a lot of Arsenal youngsters "on and off the pitch".

=== Reception ===
Former Arsenal midfielder Paul Merson described Saka as a "big moment" player, stating that he consistently delivers in crucial matches. Saka is known by the nickname "Little Chilli", given to him by then-captain Pierre-Emerick Aubameyang, who described him as having "so much energy, so much power, and being quite small." He is also referred to as "Starboy".

== Other ventures ==
In March 2024, Saka launched his own range of peri-peri sauce named "PERi-PERi Saka" at the Nando's restaurant chain.

== Personal life ==
Saka is a practising Christian and has said that he reads the Bible every night.

Since 2020, Saka has been in a relationship with Tolami Benson; although the couple keep their relationship largely private, they publicly announced their engagement in November 2025.

== Career statistics ==
=== Club ===
As of match played 21 October 2026

Appearances and goals by club, season and competition
Club	Season	League			FA Cup		EFL Cup		Europe		Other		Total	
Club	Season	Division	Apps	Goals	Apps	Goals	Apps	Goals	Apps	Goals	Apps	Goals	Apps	Goals
Arsenal U21	2018–19	—			—		—		—		4 (Note: Appearances in EFL Trophy)	1	4	1
Arsenal	2018–19	Premier League	1	0	1	0	0	0	2 (Note: Appearances in UEFA Europa League)	0	—		4	0
Arsenal	2019–20	Premier League	26	1	4	1	2	0	6	2	—		38	4
Arsenal	2020–21	Premier League	32	5	2	0	2	0	9	2	1 (Note: Appearance in FA Community Shield)	0	46	7
Arsenal	2021–22	Premier League	38	11	1	0	4	1	—		—		43	12
Arsenal	2022–23	Premier League	38	14	2	0	0	0	8	1	—		48	15
Arsenal	2023–24	Premier League	35	16	1	0	1	0	9 (Note: Appearances in UEFA Champions League)	4	1	0	47	20
Arsenal	2024–25	Premier League	25	6	0	0	3	0	9	6	—		37	12
Arsenal	2025–26	Premier League	31	7	2	0	5	1	11	3	—		49	11
Arsenal	2026–27	Premier League	7	3	0	0	0	0	3	1	1	0	11	4
Arsenal	Total		233	63	13	1	17	2	57	19	3	0	323	85
Career total			233	63	13	1	17	2	57	19	7	1	327	86

=== International ===
As of match played 3 October 2026

Appearances and goals by national team and year
National team	Year	Apps	Goals
England	2020	4	0
England	2021	10	4
England	2022	10	3
England	2023	8	4
England	2024	11	1
England	2025	5	2
England	2026	11	5
Total		59	19

As of match played 3 October 2026
England score listed first, score column indicates score after each Saka goal

List of international goals scored by Bukayo Saka
No.	Date	Venue	Cap	Opponent	Score	Result	Competition	Ref.
1	2 June 2021	Riverside Stadium, Middlesbrough, England	5	Austria	1–0	1–0	Friendly	
2	5 September 2021	Wembley Stadium, London, England	11	Andorra	4–0	4–0	2022 FIFA World Cup qualification	
3	9 October 2021	Estadi Nacional, Andorra la Vella, Andorra	12	Andorra	2–0	5–0	2022 FIFA World Cup qualification	
4	15 November 2021	San Marino Stadium, Serravalle, San Marino	14	San Marino	10–0	10–0	2022 FIFA World Cup qualification	
5	21 November 2022	Khalifa International Stadium, Al Rayyan, Qatar	21	Iran	2–0	6–2	2022 FIFA World Cup	
6	21 November 2022	Khalifa International Stadium, Al Rayyan, Qatar	21	Iran	4–0	6–2	2022 FIFA World Cup	
7	4 December 2022	Al Bayt Stadium, Al Khor, Qatar	23	Senegal	3–0	3–0	2022 FIFA World Cup	
8	26 March 2023	Wembley Stadium, London, England	26	Ukraine	2–0	2–0	UEFA Euro 2024 qualifying	
9	19 June 2023	Old Trafford, Manchester, England	28	North Macedonia	2–0	7–0	UEFA Euro 2024 qualifying	
10	19 June 2023	Old Trafford, Manchester, England	28	North Macedonia	4–0	7–0	UEFA Euro 2024 qualifying	
11	19 June 2023	Old Trafford, Manchester, England	28	North Macedonia	5–0	7–0	UEFA Euro 2024 qualifying	
12	6 July 2024	Merkur Spiel-Arena, Düsseldorf, Germany	38	Switzerland	1–1	1–1 (a.e.t.) (5–3 p)	UEFA Euro 2024	
13	9 October 2025	Wembley Stadium, London, England	45	Wales	3–0	3–0	Friendly	
14	13 November 2025	Wembley Stadium, London, England	47	Serbia	1–0	2–0	2026 FIFA World Cup qualification	
15	18 July 2026	Hard Rock Stadium, Miami Gardens, United States	56	France	3–0	6–4	2026 FIFA World Cup	
16	18 July 2026	Hard Rock Stadium, Miami Gardens, United States	56	France	4–0	6–4	2026 FIFA World Cup	
17	18 July 2026	Hard Rock Stadium, Miami Gardens, United States	56	France	5–3	6–4	2026 FIFA World Cup	
18	3 October 2026	Stadion Rujevica, Rijeka, Croatia	59	Croatia	4–0	7–0	2026–27 UEFA Nations League A	
19	3 October 2026	Stadion Rujevica, Rijeka, Croatia	59	Croatia	6–0	7–0	2026–27 UEFA Nations League A	

== Honours ==
Arsenal

- Premier League: 2025–26
- FA Cup: 2019–20
- FA Community Shield: 2020, 2023, 2026
- EFL Cup runner-up: 2025–26
- UEFA Champions League runner-up: 2025–26
- UEFA Europa League runner-up: 2018–19

England

- UEFA European Championship runner-up: 2020, 2024
- FIFA World Cup third place: 2026

Individual

- England Men's Player of the Year: 2021–22, 2022–23
- Premier League Player of the Month: March 2023
- Premier League Creative Moment of the Month: May 2026
- PFA Team of the Year: 2022–23 Premier League
- PFA Young Player of the Year: 2022–23
- Arsenal Player of the Season: 2020–21, 2021–22
- IFFHS Men's Youth (U20) World Team: 2021
- Ballon d’Or nominee: 2023, 2024
- CIES Football Observatory Best U21 Player in Europe: 2021–22
- London Football Awards Men's Young Player of the Year: 2023
- WhoScored Top Rated Player in Europe (performance data by Opta): 2024
- Sócrates Award: 2026
