= Wilhelm Meinberg =

Nazi Party politician SS-Gruppenführer

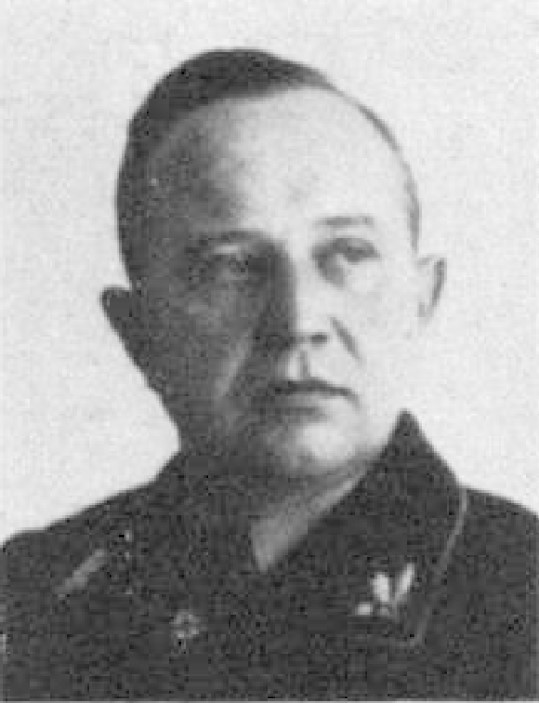
- Meinberg, c. 1938

Reich Chairman Reichsnährstand
- In office June 1933 – April 1937
- Preceded by: Position created

Board of Directors Reichswerke Hermann Göring
- In office 1937 – 8 May 1945
- Preceded by: Position created
- Succeeded by: Position abolished

Chairman Deutsche Reichspartei
- In office 25 September 1955 – July 1960
- Succeeded by: Heinrich Kunstmann

Personal details
- Born: 1 March 1898 Wasserkurl, Province of Westphalia, Kingdom of Prussia, German Empire
- Died: 8 February 1973 (aged 74) Kamen, North Rhine-Westphalia, West Germany
- Party: Nazi Party
- Other political affiliations: German National People's Party; Deutsche Reichspartei; National Democratic Party of Germany
- Occupation: Farmer

Military service
- Allegiance: German Empire
- Branch/service: Imperial German Army
- Years of service: 1916–1919
- Unit: Pioneer Battalion 15
- Battles/wars: World War I
- Awards: Iron Cross, 2nd class

Wilhelm Meinberg (1 March 1898 – 8 February 1973) was a German Nazi Party politician and agricultural expert who served as the head of the Reichsnährstand and on the board of directors of the industrial conglomerate Reichswerke Hermann Göring during the Second World War. He was also an SS-Gruppenführer. After the war, he headed a neo-Nazi Party in West Germany.

== Early life ==
Meinberg was born in Wasserkurl (today, part of Methler). He attended the Realgymnasium in Unna, obtained his Abitur and completed an agricultural apprenticeship in Brandenburg and Mecklenburg before enlisting in the Imperial German Army in 1916 and serving with Pioneer Battalion 15 in the First World War. He was awarded the Iron Cross 2nd class and was taken prisoner by the British near the war's end. Released from captivity in October 1919, in November he became a member of the Deutschvölkischer Schutz- und Trutzbund, the largest and most active antisemitic organization in the Weimar Republic. He also joined the conservative German National People's Party and, in 1923, became a farmer in Wasserkurl and founded a Stahlhelm group of war veterans, which took part in the fighting during the occupation of the Ruhr in the same year.

== Nazi Party career ==
Meinberg joined the SA in 1929 and on 1 April 1930 he joined the Nazi Party (membership number 218,582), into which he brought his Stahlhelm group. As a relatively early member of the Party, he would later be awarded the Golden Party Badge. He became the agricultural policy expert for the Gaue of North and South Westphalia, as a representative of the Party's Office for Agricultural Policy, headquartered in Munich and headed by Walther Darré. Meinberg became a board member of the Westphalia Chamber of Agriculture in 1931 and was elected as a member of the Prussian Landtag in April 1932.

Following the Nazi seizure of power, Meinberg was appointed President of the Agricultural League (Reichs-Landbund) in March 1933. On 6 May 1933, Ferdinand von Lüninck, the Westphalian Oberpräsident, appointed him State Commissioner for the Chamber of Agriculture. Meinberg became a co-founder and, from June 1933 to April 1937, Reichsobmann (Reich Chairman) and Leiter der Reichsverwaltungshauptabteilung (Head of the Reich Administration Main Department) of the Reichsnährstand (Reich Food Estate), working directly under Darré in his capacity as the Reichsbauernführer (Reich Peasant Leader). The Reichsnährstand absorbed all other farmers' organizations, including the Agricultural League, and became the sole regulator of German agriculture, controlling supply and setting prices. On 20 July 1933, Meinberg became leader of the Westphalia Farmers' Federation and on 20 February 1934, a member of the Reich Farmers' Council. On 11 July 1933, Prussian Minister President Hermann Göring appointed him to the recently reconstituted Prussian State Council, where he served until the fall of the Nazi regime.

Meinberg joined the SS (SS member number 99,436) on 7 October 1933 as an SS-Sturmbannführer and eventually attained the rank of SS-Gruppenführer on 30 January 1942. In addition, Meinberg was elected as a deputy to the Reichstag at the November 1933 German federal election from electoral constituency 18 (Westphalia South). He was reelected in 1936 and 1938, and served until he resigned his mandate in 1943.

In 1936, Darré, in his capacity as Reich Food and Agriculture Minister, appointed Meinberg his personal Special Representative for questions of food policy and market organization in the ministry. However, Meinberg intrigued to replace Darré as Reich Peasant Leader while he was on a leave of absence, and a court of honor proceeding was instituted against him. Due to the intervention of Göring, this action was suspended for a year and then dismissed, as Meinberg had left Darré's ministry when Göring appointed him to the board of directors of Reichswerke Hermann Göring.

Meinberg now changed his focus from agriculture to industry and the war economy, remaining on the industrial conglomerate's board from 1937 to 1945 and served as the deputy to Paul Pleiger, the managing director. He served on the boards of eight subsidiary and affiliated industries of the massive combine. Meinberg also was a member of the supervisory board at Dresdner Bank and the Allianz insurance company. He was appointed a Wehrwirtschaftsführer (Military Economics Leader) in June 1940. He also sat on the military economics council of the Reich Chamber of Commerce and the military economics committee of the Lower Saxony Chamber of Commerce in Hanover. In 1941, Göring, in his capacity as the Plenipotentiary for the Four-Year Plan, appointed Meinberg to be the Sonderbeauftragter (Special Representative) for coal transport.

== Post-war life ==
After the end of the Second World War, Meinberg was held in British and American captivity for 22 months. He then returned to work as a farmer. According to an investigation by the British secret service, in the post-war period he was a close collaborator of the former State Secretary in the Reich Ministry of Propaganda, Werner Naumann, who organized a group of former-Nazis known as the Naumann Circle, to infiltrate the Free Democratic Party of West Germany. In 1953 Meinberg became a member of the neo-Nazi Deutsche Reichspartei. He was elected chairman of its executive board on 29 November of that year, and was elected chairman of the party on 25 September 1955, an office which he retained until July 1960. Under his leadership, the party turned even further to the right, calling for West Germany's withdrawal from NATO and the Common Market, and advocating the creation of an authoritarian, one-party state similar to the Third Reich. Meinberg ran unsuccessfully for a seat in the Bundestag in the 1953, 1957 and 1961 federal elections. After the National Democratic Party of Germany was founded in November 1964, he became a board member and editor of the party newspaper Deutsche Nachrichten. Meinberg died in February 1973.

== SS ranks ==
SS ranks
Date	Rank
7 October 1933	SS-Sturmbannführer
9 November 1933	SS-Obersturmbannführer
20 April 1934	SS-Standartenführer
9 November 1934	SS-Oberführer
1 January 1935	SS-Brigadeführer
30 January 1942	SS-Gruppenführer

== Sources ==
- Klee, Ernst (2007). Das Personenlexikon zum Dritten Reich. Wer war was vor und nach 1945. Frankfurt-am-Main: Fischer-Taschenbuch-Verlag. ISBN 978-3-596-16048-8.
- Lilla, Joachim (2005). Der Preußische Staatsrat 1921–1933: Ein biographisches Handbuch. Düsseldorf: Droste Verlag. ISBN 978-3-770-05271-4.
- Münkel, Daniela (1996). Nationalsozialistische Agrarpolitik und Bauernalltag. Campus Forschung. ISBN 978-3-593-35602-0.
- "Ex-Nazi Heads Reich Party". The New York Times. 26 September 1955. p. 9.
- Schiffer Publishing Ltd., ed. (2000). SS Officers List: SS-Standartenführer to SS-Oberstgruppenführer (As of 30 January 1942). Schiffer Military History Publishing. ISBN 0-7643-1061-5.
- Wysocki, Gerd (1992). Arbeit Für Den Krieg: Herrschaftsmechanismen In Der Rüstungsindustrie Des Dritten Reiches: Arbeitseinsatz, Sozialpolitik Und Staatspolizeiliche, 1937-38 bis 1945. Steinweg-Verlag. ISBN 978-3-925-15151-4.
- Zentner, Christian; Bedürftig, Friedemann, eds. (1997) [1991]. The Encyclopedia of the Third Reich. New York: Da Capo Press. ISBN 978-0-306-80793-0.
