= Georgia at the UEFA European Championship =

International football delegation

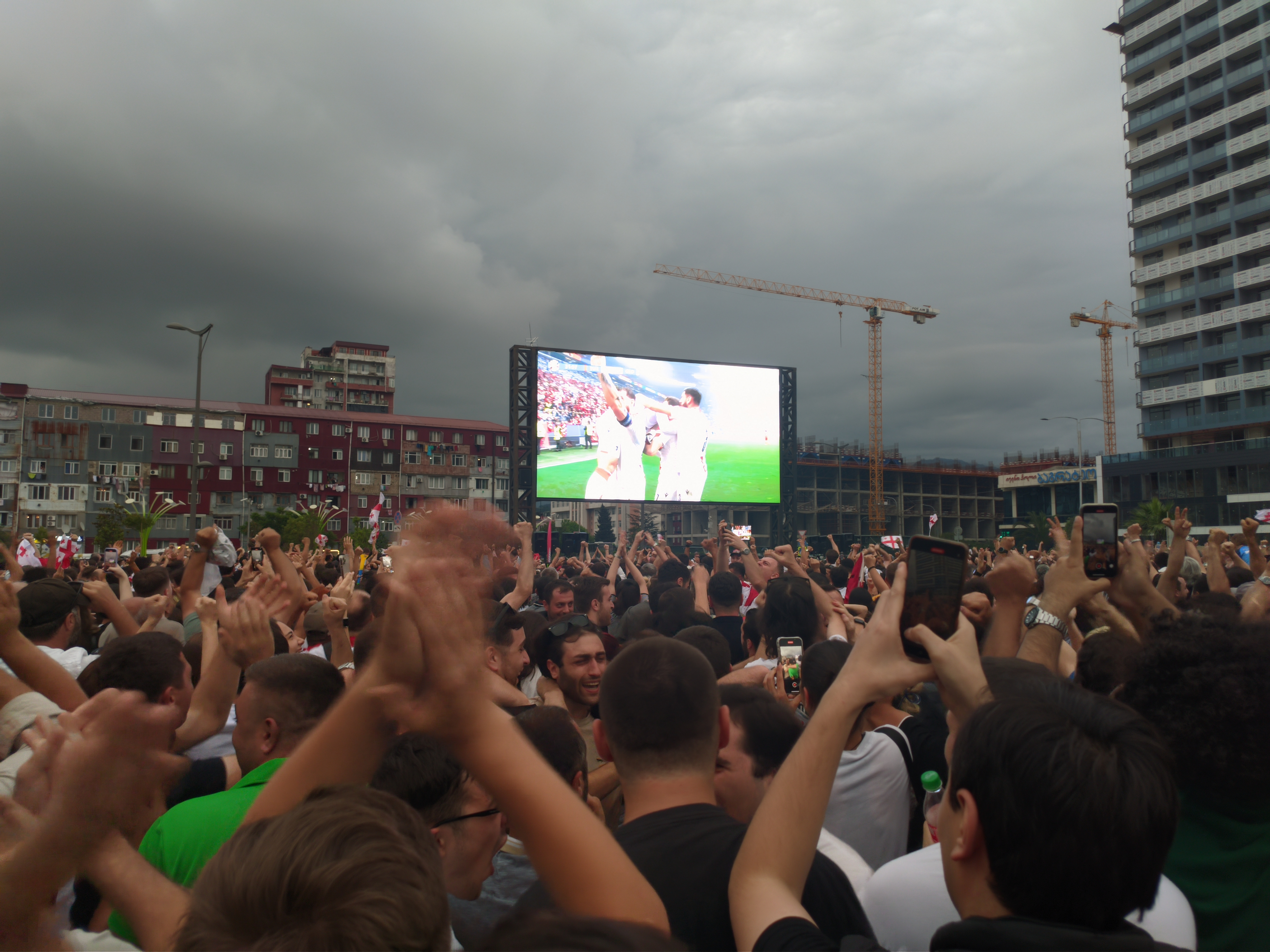
Georgian fans in the Batumi fan zone celebrating their first goal vs Turkey in Euro 2024, their first goal in the history of the tournament

Georgia have qualified once for a UEFA European Championship, the 2024 edition. At the 2024 tournament, they reached the knockout stage, before being eliminated in the last 16 by Spain.

== Euro 2024 ==
=== Group stage ===
| Pos | Team | Pld | W | D | L | GF | GA | GD | Pts | Qualification |
|---|---|---|---|---|---|---|---|---|---|---|
| 1 | Portugal | 3 | 2 | 0 | 1 | 5 | 3 | +2 | 6 (Note: Head-to-head result: Turkey 0–3 Portugal.) | Advance to knockout stage |
| 2 | Turkey | 3 | 2 | 0 | 1 | 5 | 5 | 0 | 6 | Advance to knockout stage |
| 3 | Georgia | 3 | 1 | 1 | 1 | 4 | 4 | 0 | 4 | Advance to knockout stage |
| 4 | Czech Republic | 3 | 0 | 1 | 2 | 3 | 5 | −2 | 1 | |

Source: UEFA
Notes:
18 June 2024
18:00

| Turkey | 3–1 | Georgia |
|---|---|---|
| Müldür 25'; Güler 65'; Aktürkoğlu 90+7' | Report | Mikautadze 32' |

Westfalenstadion, Dortmund
Attendance: 59,127
Referee: Facundo Tello (Argentina)

22 June 2024
15:00

| Georgia | 1–1 | Czech Republic |
|---|---|---|
| Mikautadze 45+4' (pen.) | Report | Schick 59' |

Volksparkstadion, Hamburg
Attendance: 46,524
Referee: Daniel Siebert (Germany)

26 June 2024
21:00

| Georgia | 2–0 | Portugal |
|---|---|---|
| Kvaratskhelia 2'; Mikautadze 57' (pen.) | Report |

Arena AufSchalke, Gelsenkirchen
Attendance: 49,616
Referee: Sandro Schärer (Switzerland)

Ranking of third-placed teams

| Pos | Grp | Team | Pld | W | D | L | GF | GA | GD | Pts | Qualification |
|---|---|---|---|---|---|---|---|---|---|---|---|
| 1 | D | Netherlands | 3 | 1 | 1 | 1 | 4 | 4 | 0 | 4 (Note: Disciplinary points: Netherlands −2, Georgia −6.) | Advance to knockout stage |
| 2 | F | Georgia | 3 | 1 | 1 | 1 | 4 | 4 | 0 | 4 | Advance to knockout stage |
| 3 | E | Slovakia | 3 | 1 | 1 | 1 | 3 | 3 | 0 | 4 | Advance to knockout stage |
| 4 | C | Slovenia | 3 | 0 | 3 | 0 | 2 | 2 | 0 | 3 | Advance to knockout stage |
| 5 | A | Hungary | 3 | 1 | 0 | 2 | 2 | 5 | −3 | 3 | |
| 6 | B | Croatia | 3 | 0 | 2 | 1 | 3 | 6 | −3 | 2 | |

Source: UEFA
Rules for classification: 1) Points; 2) Goal difference; 3) Goals scored; 4) Wins; 5) Lower disciplinary points total; 6) European Qualifiers overall ranking (or drawing of lots, if hosts Germany had been involved in the tiebreaker).

=== Knockout stage ===
Round of 16

30 June 2024
21:00

| Spain | 4–1 | Georgia |
|---|---|---|
| Rodri 39'; Fabián 51'; Williams 75'; Olmo 83' | Report | Le Normand 18' (o.g.) |

RheinEnergieStadion, Cologne
Attendance: 42,233
Referee: François Letexier (France)

== Overall record ==
| UEFA European Championship record | | | | | | | | | Qualification record | | | | | | |
| Year | Round | Position | Pld | W | D | L | GF | GA | Pld | W | D | L | GF | GA | Position |
|---|---|---|---|---|---|---|---|---|---|---|---|---|---|---|---|
| (France) 1960 to (Sweden) 1992 | Part of the Soviet Union | | | | | | | | Part of the Soviet Union | | | | | | |
| (England) 1996 | Did not qualify | | | | | | | | 10 | 5 | 0 | 5 | 14 | 13 | 3/6 |
| (Belgium) (Netherlands) 2000 | Did not qualify | | | | | | | | 10 | 1 | 2 | 7 | 8 | 18 | 6/6 |
| (Portugal) 2004 | Did not qualify | | | | | | | | 8 | 2 | 1 | 5 | 8 | 14 | 5/5 |
| (Austria) (Switzerland) 2008 | Did not qualify | | | | | | | | 12 | 3 | 1 | 8 | 16 | 19 | 6/7 |
| (Poland) (Ukraine) 2012 | Did not qualify | | | | | | | | 10 | 2 | 4 | 4 | 7 | 9 | 5/6 |
| (France) 2016 | Did not qualify | | | | | | | | 10 | 3 | 0 | 7 | 10 | 16 | 5/6 |
| (Europe) 2020 | Did not qualify | | | | | | | | 10 | 3 | 2 | 5 | 8 | 12 | 4/5 (PO runners-up) |
| (Germany) 2024 | Round of 16 | 15th | 4 | 1 | 1 | 2 | 5 | 8 | 10 | 3 | 3 | 4 | 14 | 18 | 4/5 (PO winners) |
| (United Kingdom) (Republic of Ireland) 2028 | To be determined | | | | | | | | To be determined | | | | | | |
| (Italy) (Turkey) 2032 | To be determined | | | | | | | | To be determined | | | | | | |
| Total | Round of 16 | 1/8 | 4 | 1 | 1 | 2 | 5 | 8 | 80 | 22 | 13 | 45 | 85 | 119 | — |

== Head-to-head record ==
| Opponent | Pld | W | D | L | GF | GA | GD | Win % |
|---|---|---|---|---|---|---|---|---|
| Czech Republic | 1 | 0 | 1 | 0 | 1 | 1 | +0 | 0.00 |
| Portugal | 1 | 1 | 0 | 0 | 2 | 0 | +2 | 100.00 |
| Spain | 1 | 0 | 0 | 1 | 1 | 4 | −3 | 0.00 |
| Turkey | 1 | 0 | 0 | 1 | 1 | 3 | −2 | 0.00 |
| Total | 4 | 1 | 1 | 2 | 5 | 8 | −3 | 25.00 |
