= Crossed hands =

Hand sign denoting Albania

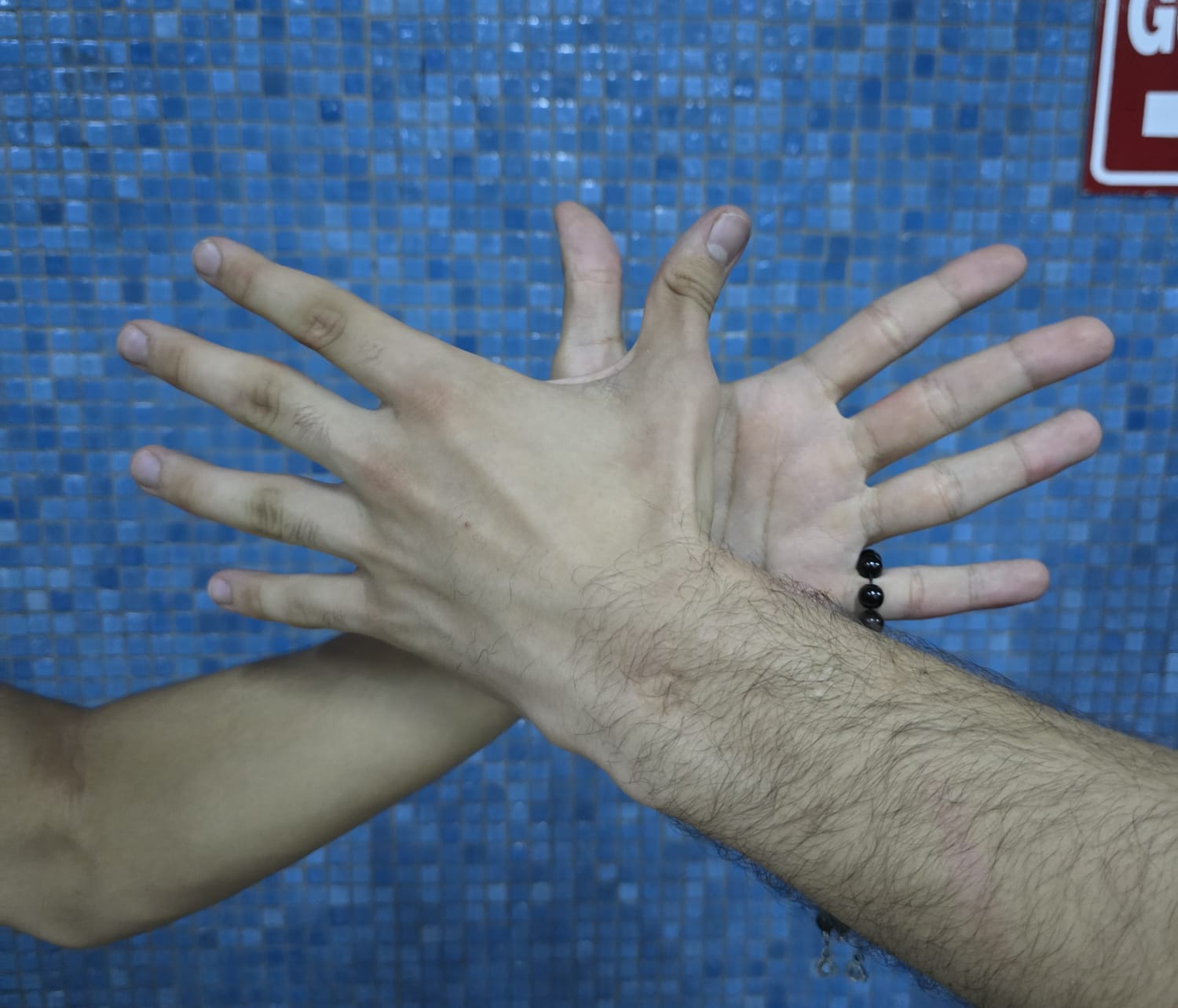
Two men with crossed hands

The crossed hands gesture is a hand signal that denotes Albania in International Sign. Known as shenja e flamurit (flag sign) in Albanian, it is sometimes referred to as the "eagle gesture" and is a symbol used by ethnic Albanians in Albania, Kosovo, and other regions of the world where Albanians live. It is meant to visually demonstrate the double-headed eagle, the main image on the Albanian flag. The nationalist symbolism of the double-headed eagle among Albanians encapsulates their ethnicity and flag, viewing it as a symbol that represents ethnic-Albanian people across the globe. Albanians call themselves as "Shqiptar" (son of eagle) and their country "Shqipëri" (land of eagles). It is also sometimes viewed as alluding to the Greater Albania irredentist concept.

This gesture is often performed by players of the Albania national football team to celebrate a goal or at the end of a victorious game. It has also been used by some ethnic Albanians playing for other teams.

In the 2018 FIFA World Cup, Swiss players of Kosovan descent Xherdan Shaqiri and Granit Xhaka and Swiss player Stephan Lichtsteiner, performed the gesture in a match against Serbia and were subsequently fined by FIFA "for unsporting behaviour contrary to the principles of fair-play". In a similar incident during the UEFA Euro 2024 Championship's Serbia–England match, Kosovar journalist Arlind Sadiku directed the gesture at Serbian fans while on a live broadcast; UEFA revoked Sadiku's Euro 2024 media accreditation pass several days later.

During a traditional annual Montenegrin high-diving competition held in July 2025 at the iconic "Vezirov most" bridge in Podgorica, diver Shkëlzen Goqi was disqualified for making the Albanian double-headed eagle gesture before his dive. Popular Montenegrin media, such as Pobjeda, described the symbol as connected to the notion of a "Greater Albania" and labeled Goqi's act as a "provocation."

During the Eurovision Song Contest 2018, Greek singer of Albanian descent Eleni Foureira made the Albanian patriotic eagle gesture in a photo with Albanian singer Eugent Bushpepa. The image went viral in Albania and Greece, being well received in the former but causing controversy in the latter.
