= SportCentrum Kaiserau =

Sports venue in Kamen, Germany

Coordinates: 51°34′23″N 7°36′48″E

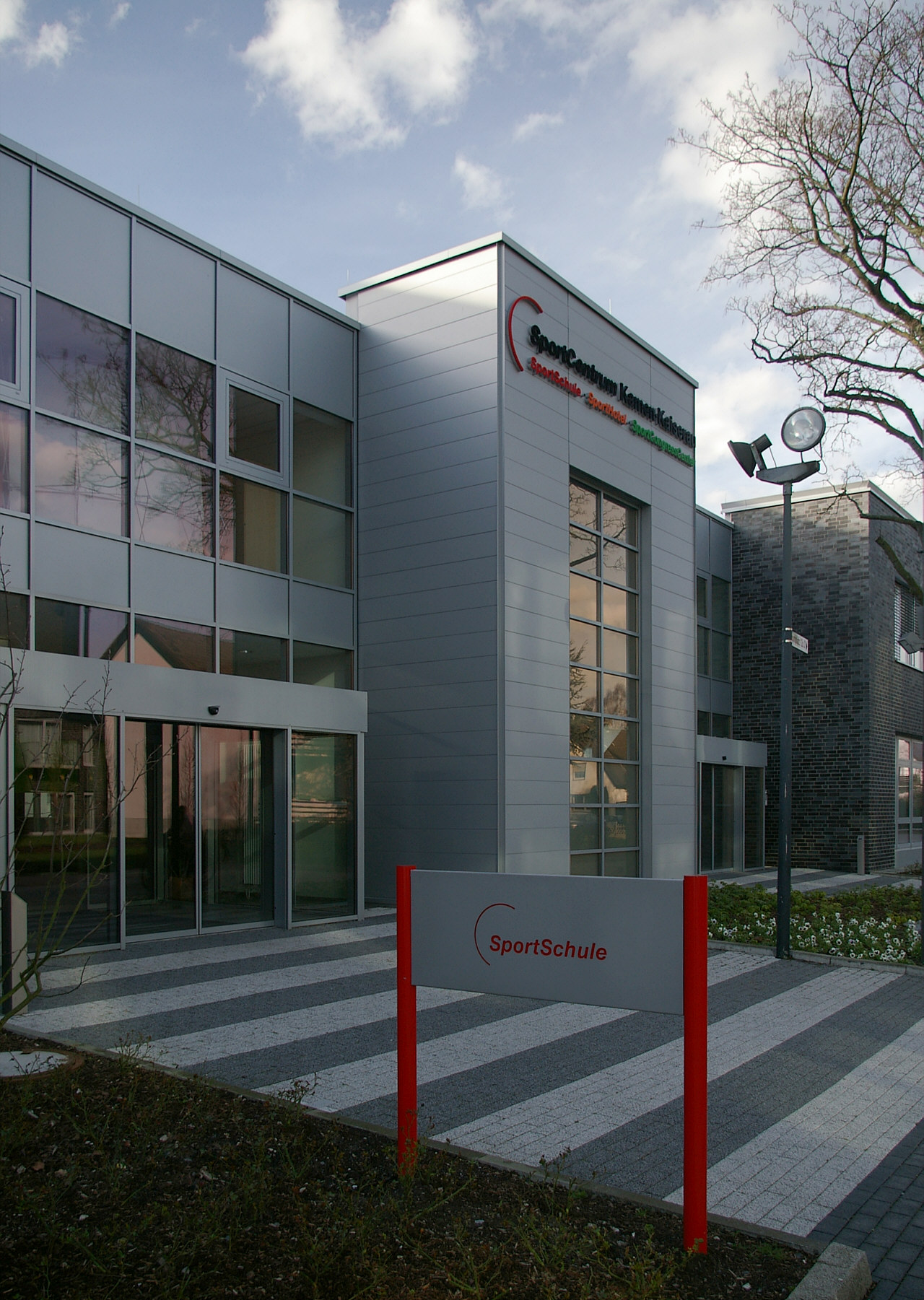
SportCentrum Kaiserau

SportCentrum Kaiserau is a sports facility located in Kamen, North Rhine-Westphalia, Germany. The centre is the home of the Westphalian Football and Athletics Association.

The centre was used as the team base camp by the Albania national football team during the UEFA Euro 2024 tournament.
