= UEFA Euro 2024 Group F =

Football tournament group stage

Group F of UEFA Euro 2024 took place from 18 to 26 June 2024. The group contained Turkey, Georgia, Portugal and the Czech Republic. Turkey, Portugal, and the Czech Republic were drawn into the Group A of the UEFA Euro 2008.

== Teams ==
Draw position	Team	Pot	Method of qualification	Date of qualification	Finals appearance	Last appearance	Previous best performance	Qualifying Rankings November 2023 (Note: The European Qualifiers overall rankings from November 2023 were used for seeding for the final draw.)	FIFA Rankings April 2024
F1	Turkey	2	Group D winner	15 October 2023	6th	2020	Semi-finals (2008)	7	40
F2	Georgia	4	Play-off winner C	26 March 2024	1st	—	Debut	34	75
F3	Portugal	1	Group J winner	13 October 2023	9th	2020	Winners (2016)	1	6
F4	Czech Republic (Note: From 1960 to 1980, the Czech Republic competed as Czechoslovakia.)	3	Group E runner-up	16 November 2023	11th	2020	Winners (1976)	17	36

== Standings ==
Pos	Team	Pld	W	D	L	GF	GA	GD	Pts	Qualification
1	Portugal	3	2	0	1	5	3	+2	6 (Note: Head-to-head result: Turkey 0–3 Portugal.)	Advance to knockout stage
2	Turkey	3	2	0	1	5	5	0	6	Advance to knockout stage
3	Georgia	3	1	1	1	4	4	0	4	Advance to knockout stage
4	Czech Republic	3	0	1	2	3	5	−2	1	

Source: UEFA
Rules for classification: Group stage tiebreakers
Notes:

In the round of 16,

- The winner of Group F, Portugal, advanced to play the third-placed team of Group C, Slovenia.
- The runner-up of Group F, Turkey, advanced to play the winner of Group D, Austria.
- The third-placed team of Group F, Georgia, advanced to play the winner of Group B, Spain.

== Matches ==
=== Turkey vs Georgia ===
With his goal, Turkey's Arda Güler became the youngest debutant to score a goal in the UEFA European Championship final tournament.

18 June 2024
18:00

Turkey	3–1	Georgia
Müldür 25'; Güler 65'; Aktürkoğlu 90+7'	Report	Mikautadze 32'

Westfalenstadion, Dortmund
Attendance: 59,127
Referee: Facundo Tello (Argentina)

Turkey	Georgia

GK	1	Mert Günok
RB	18	Mert Müldür		(substituted off) 85'
CB	4	Samet Akaydin
CB	14	Abdülkerim Bardakcı	(yellow card) 35'
LB	20	Ferdi Kadıoğlu
CM	22	Kaan Ayhan		(substituted off) 79'
CM	10	Hakan Çalhanoğlu (c)	(yellow card) 89'	(substituted off) 90+2'
RW	8	Arda Güler		(substituted off) 79'
AM	6	Orkun Kökçü
LW	19	Kenan Yıldız		(substituted off) 85'
CF	21	Barış Alper Yılmaz
Substitutions:
MF	11	Yusuf Yazıcı		(substituted on) 79'
DF	3	Merih Demiral		(substituted on) 79'
FW	7	Kerem Aktürkoğlu		(substituted on) 85'
DF	2	Zeki Çelik		(substituted on) 85'
MF	15	Salih Özcan		(substituted on) 90+2'
Manager:
(Italy) Vincenzo Montella

GK	25	Giorgi Mamardashvili
CB	5	Solomon Kvirkvelia	(yellow card) 55'	(substituted off) 85'
CB	4	Guram Kashia (c)
CB	3	Lasha Dvali
RWB	2	Otar Kakabadze
LWB	21	Giorgi Tsitaishvili		(substituted off) 74'
CM	6	Giorgi Kochorashvili
CM	20	Anzor Mekvabishvili		(substituted off) 89'
CM	10	Giorgi Chakvetadze		(substituted off) 74'
CF	22	Georges Mikautadze
CF	7	Khvicha Kvaratskhelia
Substitutions:
MF	9	Zuriko Davitashvili		(substituted on) 74'
DF	14	Luka Lochoshvili		(substituted on) 74'
FW	8	Budu Zivzivadze		(substituted on) 85'
MF	18	Sandro Altunashvili		(substituted on) 89'
Manager:
(France) Willy Sagnol

Man of the Match:
Arda Güler (Turkey)

Assistant referees:
Gabriel Chade (Argentina)
Ezequiel Brailovsky (Argentina)
Fourth official:
Donatas Rumšas (Lithuania)
Reserve assistant referee:
Aleksandr Radiuš (Lithuania)
Video assistant referee:
Alejandro Hernández Hernández (Spain)
Assistant video assistant referees:
Juan Martínez Munuera (Spain)
David Coote (England)

=== Portugal vs Czech Republic ===
With his start, Portugal's Pepe became the oldest player to make an appearance in the final tournament of the UEFA European Championship. With his appearance, Cristiano Ronaldo became the first player to take part in six UEFA European Championships and the oldest captain to appear at a Euro finals.

18 June 2024
21:00

Portugal	2–1	Czech Republic
Hranáč 69' (o.g.); Conceição 90+2'	Report	Provod 62'

Red Bull Arena, Leipzig
Attendance: 38,421
Referee: Marco Guida (Italy)

Portugal	Czech Republic

GK	22	Diogo Costa
CB	5	Diogo Dalot		(substituted off) 63'
CB	3	Pepe
CB	4	Rúben Dias
CM	10	Bernardo Silva
CM	8	Bruno Fernandes
CM	23	Vitinha		(substituted off) 90'
RW	20	João Cancelo		(substituted off) 90'
LW	19	Nuno Mendes		(substituted off) 90'
CF	7	Cristiano Ronaldo (c)
CF	17	Rafael Leão	(yellow card) 39'	(substituted off) 63'
Substitutions:
FW	21	Diogo Jota		(substituted on) 63'
DF	14	Gonçalo Inácio		(substituted on) 63'
FW	26	Francisco Conceição	(yellow card) 90+3'	(substituted on) 90'
DF	2	Nélson Semedo		(substituted on) 90'
MF	25	Pedro Neto		(substituted on) 90'
Manager:
(Spain) Roberto Martínez

GK	1	Jindřich Staněk
CB	3	Tomáš Holeš		(substituted off) 90+3'
CB	4	Robin Hranáč
CB	18	Ladislav Krejčí
DM	22	Tomáš Souček (c)
RM	5	Vladimír Coufal
LM	12	David Douděra
AM	25	Pavel Šulc		(substituted off) 79'
AM	14	Lukáš Provod		(substituted off) 79'
CF	11	Jan Kuchta		(substituted off) 60'
CF	10	Patrik Schick	(yellow card) 57'	(substituted off) 60'
Substitutions:
MF	20	Ondřej Lingr		(substituted on) 60'
FW	13	Mojmír Chytil		(substituted on) 60'
MF	7	Antonín Barák		(substituted on) 79'
MF	8	Petr Ševčík		(substituted on) 79'
FW	19	Tomáš Chorý		(substituted on) 90+3'
Manager:
Ivan Hašek

Man of the Match:
Vitinha (Portugal)

Assistant referees:
Filippo Meli (Italy)
Giorgio Peretti (Italy)
Fourth official:
Rade Obrenović (Slovenia)
Reserve assistant referee:
Jure Praprotnik (Slovenia)
Video assistant referee:
Massimiliano Irrati (Italy)
Assistant video assistant referees:
Paolo Valeri (Italy)
Fedayi San (Switzerland)

=== Georgia vs Czech Republic ===
22 June 2024
15:00

Georgia	1–1	Czech Republic
Mikautadze 45+4' (pen.)	Report	Schick 59'

Volksparkstadion, Hamburg
Attendance: 46,524
Referee: Daniel Siebert (Germany)

Georgia	Czech Republic

GK	25	Giorgi Mamardashvili
CB	5	Solomon Kvirkvelia		(substituted off) 82'
CB	4	Guram Kashia (c)	(yellow card) 36'
CB	3	Lasha Dvali
DM	20	Anzor Mekvabishvili	(yellow card) 83'
CM	9	Zuriko Davitashvili		(substituted off) 62'
CM	6	Giorgi Kochorashvili	(yellow card) 90+5'
RW	21	Giorgi Tsitaishvili		(substituted off) 62'
LW	2	Otar Kakabadze
CF	22	Georges Mikautadze		(substituted off) 88'
CF	7	Khvicha Kvaratskhelia		(substituted off) 82'
Substitutions:
DF	14	Luka Lochoshvili		(substituted on) 62'
MF	10	Giorgi Chakvetadze		(substituted on) 62'
DF	15	Giorgi Gvelesiani	(yellow card) 82'	(substituted on) 82'
MF	23	Saba Lobzhanidze		(substituted on) 82'
FW	11	Giorgi Kvilitaia		(substituted on) 88'
Manager:
(France) Willy Sagnol

GK	1	Jindřich Staněk
CB	3	Tomáš Holeš	(yellow card) 53'
CB	4	Robin Hranáč
CB	18	Ladislav Krejčí
CM	14	Lukáš Provod	(yellow card) 40'	(substituted off) 81'
CM	22	Tomáš Souček (c)	(yellow card) 81'
RW	5	Vladimír Coufal	(yellow card) 18'
LW	15	David Jurásek	(yellow card) 47'	(substituted off) 81'
RF	17	Václav Černý		(substituted off) 55'
CF	10	Patrik Schick		(substituted off) 68'
LF	9	Adam Hložek		(substituted off) 55'
Substitutions:
MF	26	Matěj Jurásek		(substituted on) 55'
MF	20	Ondřej Lingr		(substituted on) 55'
FW	13	Mojmír Chytil		(substituted on) 68'
MF	7	Antonín Barák		(substituted on) 81'
MF	8	Petr Ševčík		(substituted on) 81'
Manager:
Ivan Hašek

Man of the Match:
Giorgi Mamardashvili (Georgia)

Assistant referees:
Jan Seidel (Germany)
Rafael Foltyn (Germany)
Fourth official:
Irfan Peljto (Bosnia and Herzegovina)
Reserve assistant referee:
Senad Ibrišimbegović (Bosnia and Herzegovina)
Video assistant referee:
Marco Fritz (Germany)
Assistant video assistant referees:
David Coote (England)
Pol van Boekel (Netherlands)

=== Turkey vs Portugal ===
22 June 2024
18:00

Turkey	0–3	Portugal
	Report	B. Silva 21'; Akaydin 28' (o.g.); Fernandes 56'

Westfalenstadion, Dortmund
Attendance: 61,047
Referee: Felix Zwayer (Germany)

Turkey	Portugal

GK	12	Altay Bayındır
RB	2	Zeki Çelik	(yellow card) 42'
CB	4	Samet Akaydin	(yellow card) 42'	(substituted off) 75'
CB	14	Abdülkerim Bardakcı	(yellow card) 25'
LB	20	Ferdi Kadıoğlu
CM	10	Hakan Çalhanoğlu (c)
CM	22	Kaan Ayhan		(substituted off) 58'
RW	25	Yunus Akgün		(substituted off) 70'
AM	6	Orkun Kökçü		(substituted off) 46'
LW	7	Kerem Aktürkoğlu		(substituted off) 58'
CF	21	Barış Alper Yılmaz
Substitutions:
MF	11	Yusuf Yazıcı		(substituted on) 46'
FW	19	Kenan Yıldız		(substituted on) 58'
MF	16	İsmail Yüksek		(substituted on) 58'
FW	8	Arda Güler		(substituted on) 70'
DF	3	Merih Demiral		(substituted on) 75'
Manager:
(Italy) Vincenzo Montella

GK	22	Diogo Costa
RB	20	João Cancelo		(substituted off) 68'
CB	3	Pepe		(substituted off) 83'
CB	4	Rúben Dias
LB	19	Nuno Mendes
CM	6	João Palhinha	(yellow card) 45'	(substituted off) 46'
CM	23	Vitinha		(substituted off) 88'
CM	8	Bruno Fernandes
RF	10	Bernardo Silva
CF	17	Rafael Leão	(yellow card) 39'	(substituted off) 46'
LF	7	Cristiano Ronaldo (c)
Substitutions:
MF	18	Rúben Neves		(substituted on) 46'
MF	25	Pedro Neto		(substituted on) 46'
DF	2	Nélson Semedo		(substituted on) 68'
DF	24	António Silva		(substituted on) 83'
MF	15	João Neves		(substituted on) 88'
Manager:
(Spain) Roberto Martínez

Man of the Match:
Bernardo Silva (Portugal)

Assistant referees:
Stefan Lupp (Germany)
Marco Achmüller (Germany)
Fourth official:
Jesús Gil Manzano (Spain)
Reserve assistant referee:
Diego Barbero Sevilla (Spain)
Video assistant referee:
Bastian Dankert (Germany)
Assistant video assistant referees:
Christian Dingert (England)
Rob Dieperink (Netherlands)

=== Georgia vs Portugal ===
Based on the FIFA Men's World Ranking, Georgia's win was the biggest upset in UEFA European Championship history, with 68 places separating Portugal (6th) and Georgia (74th), breaking the record set by Slovakia's win over Belgium in Group E on 17 June.

26 June 2024
21:00

Georgia	2–0	Portugal
Kvaratskhelia 2'; Mikautadze 57' (pen.)	Report

Arena AufSchalke, Gelsenkirchen
Attendance: 49,616
Referee: Sandro Schärer (Switzerland)

Georgia	Portugal

GK	25	Giorgi Mamardashvili
CB	15	Giorgi Gvelesiani		(substituted off) 76'
CB	4	Guram Kashia (c)
CB	14	Luka Lochoshvili		(substituted off) 63'
RWB	2	Otar Kakabadze
LWB	3	Lasha Dvali
CM	10	Giorgi Chakvetadze		(substituted off) 81'
CM	6	Giorgi Kochorashvili
CM	17	Otar Kiteishvili
CF	22	Georges Mikautadze
CF	7	Khvicha Kvaratskhelia		(substituted off) 81'
Substitutions:
MF	21	Giorgi Tsitaishvili		(substituted on) 63'
DF	5	Solomon Kvirkvelia		(substituted on) 76'
MF	20	Anzor Mekvabishvili	(yellow card) 85'	(substituted on) 81'
MF	9	Zuriko Davitashvili		(substituted on) 81'
Manager:
(France) Willy Sagnol

GK	22	Diogo Costa
CB	24	António Silva		(substituted off) 66'
CB	13	Danilo Pereira
CB	14	Gonçalo Inácio
CM	15	João Neves		(substituted off) 75'
CM	6	João Palhinha		(substituted off) 46'
RW	5	Diogo Dalot
AM	26	Francisco Conceição
LW	25	Pedro Neto	(yellow card) 44'	(substituted off) 75'
CF	7	Cristiano Ronaldo (c)	(yellow card) 28'	(substituted off) 66'
CF	11	João Félix
Substitutions:
MF	18	Rúben Neves	(yellow card) 53'	(substituted on) 46'
FW	9	Gonçalo Ramos		(substituted on) 66'
DF	2	Nélson Semedo		(substituted on) 66'
FW	21	Diogo Jota		(substituted on) 75'
MF	16	Matheus Nunes		(substituted on) 75'
Manager:
(Spain) Roberto Martínez

Man of the Match:
Khvicha Kvaratskhelia (Georgia)

Assistant referees:
Stefan Lupp (Germany)
Bekim Zogaj (Switzerland)
Fourth official:
Mykola Balakin (Ukraine)
Reserve assistant referee:
Oleksandr Berkut (Ukraine)
Video assistant referee:
Fedayi San (Switzerland)
Assistant video assistant referees:
Willy Delajod (France)
Jérôme Brisard (France)

=== Czech Republic vs Turkey ===
With 19 yellow cards shown, this match broke the European Championship record for the most cautions among both teams in a single match. Antonín Barák was sent off after 20 minutes, also a tournament record.

26 June 2024
21:00

Czech Republic	1–2	Turkey
Souček 66'	Report	Çalhanoğlu 51'; Tosun 90+4'

Volksparkstadion, Hamburg
Attendance: 47,683
Referee: István Kovács (Romania)

Czech Republic	Turkey

GK	1	Jindřich Staněk		(substituted off) 55'
CB	3	Tomáš Holeš
CB	4	Robin Hranáč
CB	18	Ladislav Krejčí	(yellow card) 90+1'
RM	5	Vladimír Coufal
CM	22	Tomáš Souček (c)	(yellow card) 90+8'
CM	14	Lukáš Provod		(substituted off) 75'
LM	15	David Jurásek		(substituted off) 81'
AM	7	Antonín Barák	(yellow card) 11' (yellow-red card) 20'
CF	13	Mojmír Chytil		(substituted off) 55'
CF	9	Adam Hložek		(substituted off) 55'
Substitutions:
GK	16	Matěj Kovář		(substituted on) 55'
FW	19	Tomáš Chorý	(red card) 90+8'	(substituted on) 55'
FW	11	Jan Kuchta		(substituted on) 55'
MF	20	Ondřej Lingr		(substituted on) 75'
MF	26	Matěj Jurásek		(substituted on) 81'
Other disciplinary actions:
FW	10	Patrik Schick	(yellow card) 34'
GK	23	Vítězslav Jaroš	(yellow card) 84'
MF	21	Lukáš Červ	(yellow card) 85'
Manager:
Ivan Hašek

GK	1	Mert Günok	(yellow card) 64'
RB	18	Mert Müldür	(yellow card) 80'
CB	4	Samet Akaydin	(yellow card) 85'
CB	3	Merih Demiral
LB	20	Ferdi Kadıoğlu
CM	16	İsmail Yüksek	(yellow card) 49'	(substituted off) 63'
CM	15	Salih Özcan	(yellow card) 31'	(substituted off) 46'
RW	8	Arda Güler	(yellow card) 90+8'	(substituted off) 75'
AM	10	Hakan Çalhanoğlu (c)	(yellow card) 66'	(substituted off) 87'
LW	19	Kenan Yıldız	(yellow card) 37'	(substituted off) 75'
CF	21	Barış Alper Yılmaz
Substitutions:
MF	22	Kaan Ayhan	(yellow card) 90+5'	(substituted on) 46'
MF	5	Okay Yokuşlu		(substituted on) 63'
FW	9	Cenk Tosun		(substituted on) 75'
FW	7	Kerem Aktürkoğlu		(substituted on) 75'
MF	6	Orkun Kökçü	(yellow card) 90+5'	(substituted on) 87'
Other disciplinary actions:
GK	23	Uğurcan Çakır	(yellow card) 68'
TS	—	(Italy) Gaetano Salierno	(yellow card) 68'
Manager:
(Italy) Vincenzo Montella

Man of the Match:
Barış Alper Yılmaz (Turkey)

Assistant referees:
Vasile Marinescu (Romania)
Mihai Ovidiu Artene (Romania)
Fourth official:
Espen Eskås (Norway)
Reserve assistant referee:
Jan Erik Engan (Norway)
Video assistant referee:
Tomasz Kwiatkowski (Poland)
Assistant video assistant referees:
Bartosz Frankowski (Poland)
Pol van Boekel (Netherlands)

== Discipline ==
Fair play points would have been used as a tiebreaker if the head-to-head and overall records of teams had been tied (and if a penalty shoot-out was not applicable as a tiebreaker). These were calculated based on yellow and red cards received by players and team officials in all group matches as follows:

- yellow card = 1 point
- red card as a result of two yellow cards = 3 points
- direct red card = 3 points
- yellow card followed by direct red card = 4 points

Only one of the above deductions was applied to a player or team official in a single match.

Team	Match 1				Match 2				Match 3				Points
Team	Booked	(yellow card) (yellow-red card)	Sent off (straight red)	(yellow card) (red card)	Booked	(yellow card) (yellow-red card)	Sent off (straight red)	(yellow card) (red card)	Booked	(yellow card) (yellow-red card)	Sent off (straight red)	(yellow card) (red card)	Points
Georgia	1				4				1				−6
Portugal	2				2				3				−7
Czech Republic	1				5				5	1	1		−17
Turkey	2				3				12 (Note: Count includes a card for a technical staff member of the team)				−17

== See also ==
- Czech Republic at the UEFA European Championship
- Georgia at the UEFA European Championship
- Portugal at the UEFA European Championship
- Turkey at the UEFA European Championship
