= Arlind Sadiku =

Albanian journalist

- Born: 12 October 1989 (age 36); Pristina, SFR Yugoslavia
- Occupation: Football commentator
- Years active: 2010–present
- Known for: Expert in statistical analysis for local football

Arlind Sadiku (born 12 October 1989) is a Kosovar journalist and sports commentator. Currently he works in ArtMotion. He is expert in statistical analysis for local football.

During UEFA Euro 2024 he got his media credentials revoked after he made the crossed hands gesture towards Serbia fans on a live broadcast at their game against England in group stage.

== Career ==
Sadiku entered the profession of journalism when he was 18. The first steps began in Klan Kosova where he worked for about a year and a half. Since 2010 he has been part of the DigitAlb/SuperSport team. In December 2013, the Association of Professional Journalists of Kosovo, Sports, awarded the prize "Ali Shala" for journalists with the best sports coverage of 2013. In May 2015 he was elected General Secretary of Sports Journalists Associacion of Kosovo. Nine months later, of February 2016, in AIPS 79th Congress in Doha, Qatar, SJAK became full member of AIPS (International Sports Press Association). In next four years he represented Kosovo in the three other AIPS Congresses which was held in Seoul, Brussels and Lausanne. Every year from 2016, he is in voting panel for The Guardian choosing top 100 footballers of the year.

== Football commentary career ==
Besides commenting on the matches from the Football Superleague of Kosovo, Sadiku has also commented on matches from the Premier League, Champions League, Europa League, Serie A, etc. Until now Sadiku has commented more than 2,103 football games, particularly in the Premier League.

== Other work ==
He has cooperated with Football Federation of Kosovo, from 2015 to 2018 where he worked as a statistician. But left the job after Agim Ademi became the head of the federation of kosovo and began a feud against him.

== Family and personal life ==
Arlind Sadiku is married to Edita Ademi and they have three children, Meris, Siar and Siera
