= Kamen =

- Town
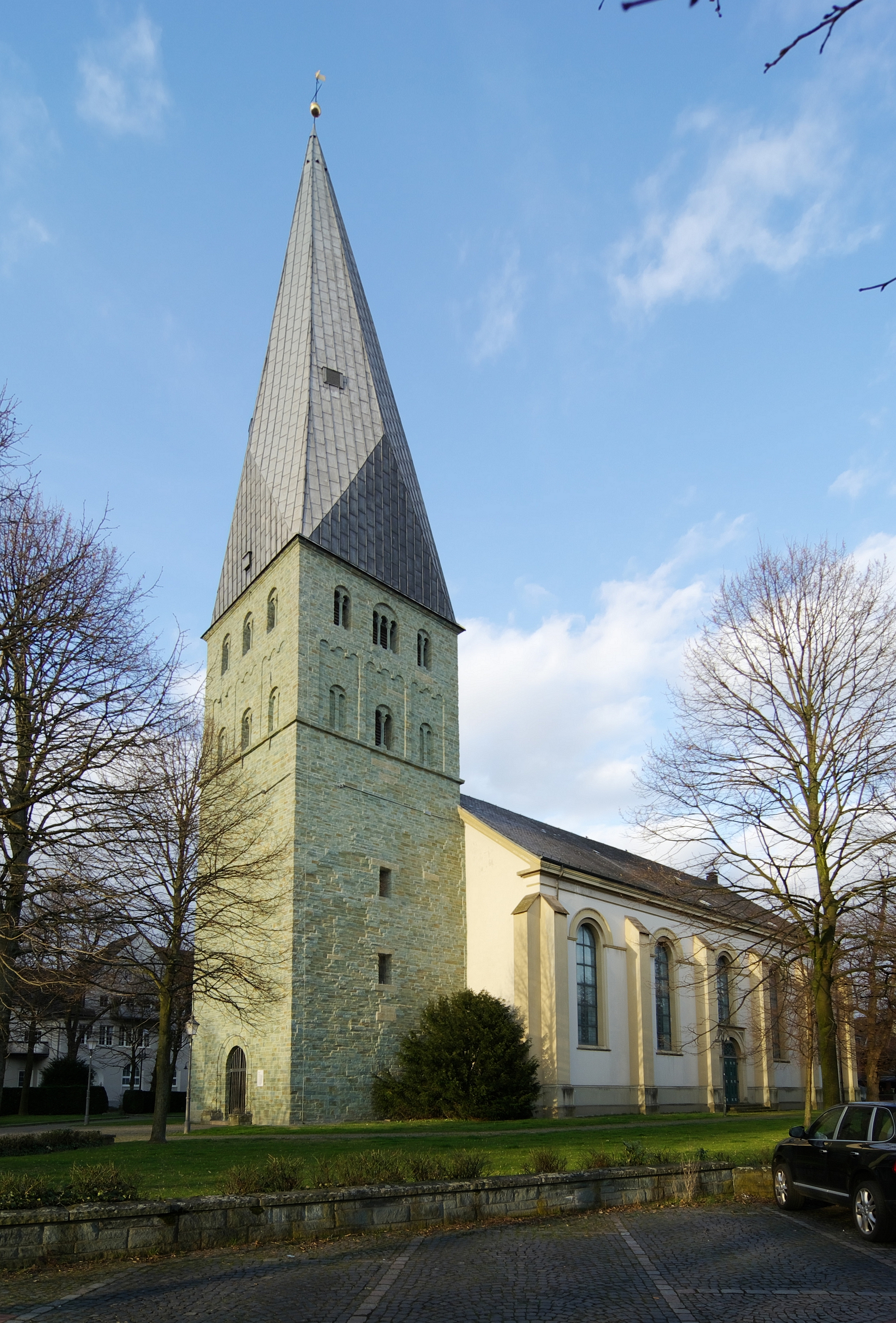
- Pauluskirche in Kamen

- Flag Coat of arms

- Location of Kamen within Unna district
- Interactive map of Kamen
- Location within Germany Location within North Rhine-Westphalia
- Coordinates: 51°35′30″N 7°39′55″E
- Country: Germany
- State: North Rhine-Westphalia
- Admin. region: Arnsberg
- District: Unna
- Subdivisions: 6

Government
  - Mayor (2018–30): Elke Kappen (SPD)

Area
  - Total: 40.95 km^{2} (15.81 sq mi)
- Elevation: 67 m (220 ft)

Population (2025-12-31)
  - Total: 42,139
  - Density: 1,029/km^{2} (2,665/sq mi)
- Time zone: UTC+01:00 (CET)
  - Summer (DST): UTC+02:00 (CEST)
- Postal codes: 59154–59174
- Dialling codes: 02307
- Vehicle registration: UN
- Website: www.stadt-kamen.de

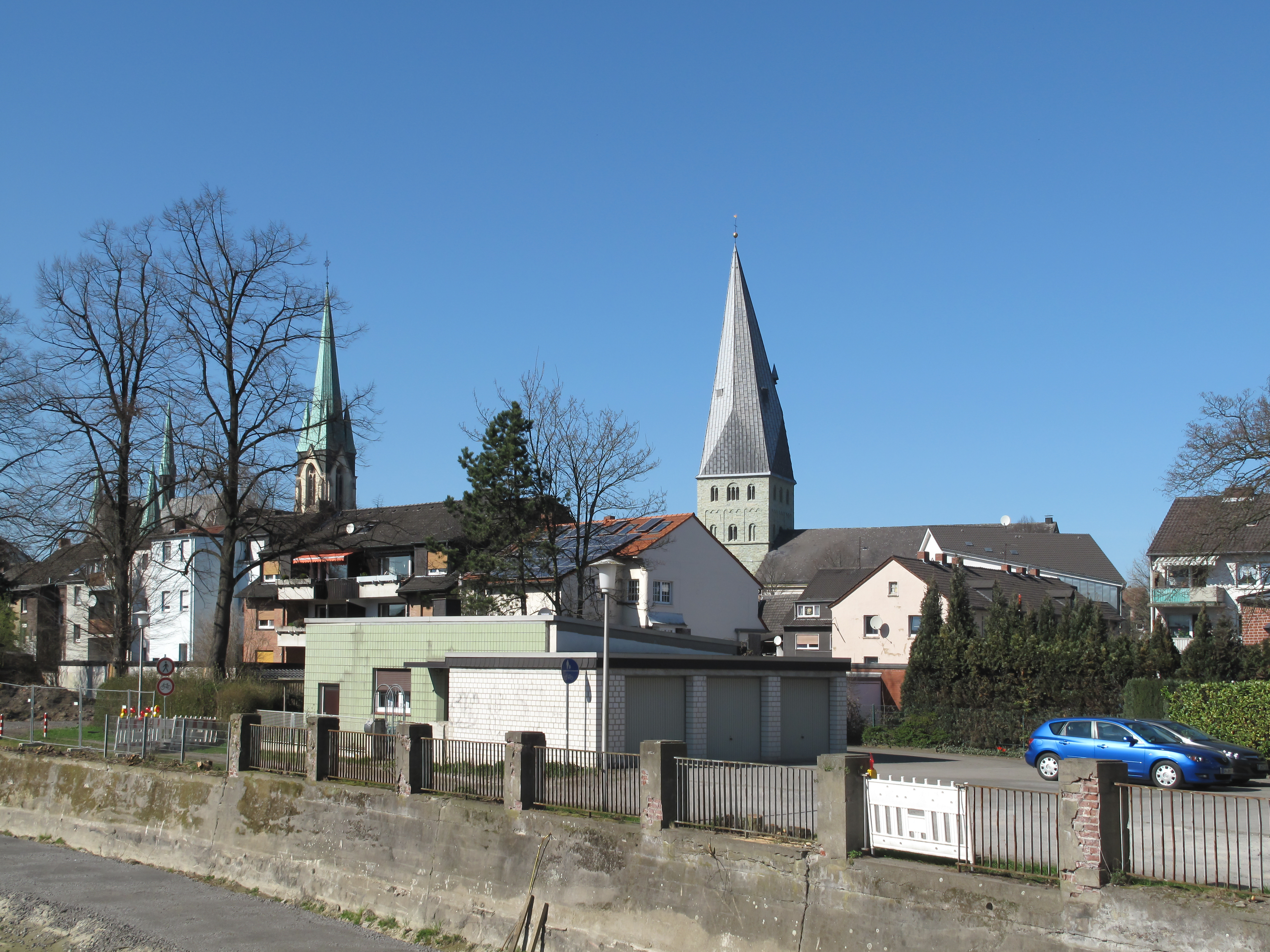
Kamen, view to the town

Kamen (German pronunciation: [ˈkaːmən]) is a town in North Rhine-Westphalia, Germany, in the district Unna.

== Geography ==
Kamen is situated at the east end of the Ruhr area, approximately 10 km south-west of Hamm and 25 km north-east of Dortmund.

=== Neighbouring cities, towns, and municipalities ===
- Bergkamen
- Hamm
- Bönen
- Unna
- Dortmund
- Lünen

=== Division of the town ===
The town of Kamen consists of the following 6 districts:

- Heeren-Werve
- Methler
- Kamen (city centre)
- Rottum
- Derne
- Südkamen

=== Council of the town ===
Elections held in May 2014.

- SPD: 22
- CDU: 10
- Alliance 90/The Greens: 4
- The Left: 2
- FDP: 1
- FW: 1

== Population ==
Historical population

Year	Pop.	±% p.a.
1965	39,196	—
1970	42,058	+1.42%
1975	43,054	+0.47%
1980	44,012	+0.44%
1985	44,392	+0.17%
1990	46,160	+0.78%
1995	46,977	+0.35%

Year	Pop.	±% p.a.
2000	46,565	−0.18%
2005	45,767	−0.35%
2010	44,398	−0.61%
2015	43,868	−0.24%
2020	42,875	−0.46%
2025	42,139	−0.35%

Source: Landesdatabank Nordrhein-Westfalen

== Mayor ==
Hermann Hupe (born 1950) (teacher), was elected mayor in 2003 with 55,1 % of the votes, he was reelected in 2009 and 2014. In 2018, Elke Kappen was elected with 54,3% of the votes in a runoff election, she was reelected in 2025 with 50,2% of the votes.

== Twin towns – sister cities ==
Kamen is twinned with:

- Ängelholm, Sweden
- Bandırma, Turkey
- Beeskow, Germany
- Eilat, Israel
- Montreuil-Juigné, France
- Sulęcin, Poland
- Unkel, Germany

== Transport ==
Kamen is maybe most known because of the nearby highway crossing, the Kamener Kreuz. The north-south directed A1 meets the east-west directed A2; due to the importance of both highways the crossing is prone for traffic jams.

== Sports ==
The village Kamen-Methler is well known for its football training camps. The German football team prepared themselves for the 1990 World Cup win in Kamen-Methler. During the soccer world championship 2006 in Germany the Spanish football team lived there. The SportCentrum Kaiserau was notably used as the team base camp by the Albania national football team during the UEFA Euro 2024 tournament.

== Notable people ==
- Ernst Marcus (1856–1928), judge and philosopher
- Erich Weber (1860–1933), general
- Wilhelm Middelschulte (1863–1943), organist, composer and teacher
- Elmar Altvater (1938–2018), political scientist
- Hartmut Weber (born 1960), athlete
- Bastian Seidel (born 1975), Australian physician and politician
- Frank Fahrenhorst (born 1977), football player and coach
