= UEFA Euro 2024 =

17th edition of the UEFA European Football Championship

Fußball-Europameisterschaft 2024 (in German)
- United by Football. Vereint im Herzen Europas. (United in the heart of Europe.)

Tournament details
- Host country: Germany
- Dates: 14 June – 14 July
- Teams: 24
- Venues: 10 (in 10 host cities)

Final positions
- Champions: Spain (4th title)
- Runners-up: England
- Third place: France; Netherlands

Tournament statistics
- Matches played: 51
- Goals scored: 117 (2.29 per match)
- Attendance: 2,681,288 (52,574 per match)
- Top scorers: (England) Harry Kane; (Georgia (country)) Georges Mikautadze; (Germany) Jamal Musiala; (Netherlands) Cody Gakpo; (Slovakia) Ivan Schranz; (Spain) Dani Olmo; (3 goals each)
- Best player: (Spain) Rodri
- Best young player: (Spain) Lamine Yamal

The 2024 UEFA European Football Championship, commonly referred to as UEFA Euro 2024 or simply Euro 2024, was the 17th UEFA European Championship, the quadrennial international football championship organised by UEFA for the European men's national teams of their member associations. Germany hosted the tournament, which took place from 14 June to 14 July 2024. The tournament involved 24 teams.

It was the third time that European Championship matches were played on German territory and the second time in reunified Germany, as West Germany hosted the 1988 tournament, and four matches of the multi-national Euro 2020 were played in Munich. It was the first time the competition was held in what was formerly East Germany, with Leipzig as a host city, as well as the first major tournament since the 2006 FIFA World Cup that Germany served as a solo host nation. The tournament returned to its usual four-year cycle after the 2020 edition was postponed to 2021 due to the COVID-19 pandemic.

Georgia made their tournament debut. Italy were the defending champions, having won the 2020 final against England on penalties, but failed to defend the title after being eliminated by Switzerland in the round of 16. Host nation Germany were eliminated by Spain in the quarter-finals; Spain went on to win the tournament for a record fourth time after defeating England 2–1 in the final.

== Host selection ==
On 8 March 2017, UEFA announced that two countries, Germany and Turkey, had announced their intentions to host the tournament before the deadline of 3 March 2017.

The host was chosen by the UEFA Executive Committee in a confidential ballot, needing only a simple majority of votes to win. If the votes were equal, the final decision rested with UEFA president Aleksander Čeferin. Out of the 20 members of the UEFA Executive Committee, Reinhard Grindel (Germany) and Servet Yardımcı (Turkey) could not vote because they were ineligible. Lars-Christer Olsson (Sweden) was also absent due to illness. In total, 17 members were able to vote.

The host was selected on 27 September 2018 in Nyon, Switzerland. Germany initially planned to fully host Euro 2020, although it had not announced any firm interest by May 2012.

Voting results
Country	Votes
Germany	12
Turkey	4
Abstention	1
Total	17

== Venues ==
Location of the host cities of the UEFA Euro 2024.

Germany had a wide selection of stadiums that met UEFA's minimum capacity requirement of 30,000 seats for European Championship matches. The Olympiastadion in Berlin was the largest stadium at UEFA Euro 2024. It hosted the final of the tournament, along with three group-stage matches, a round of 16 match, and a quarterfinal.

Of the ten venues selected for Euro 2024, nine were used for the 2006 FIFA World Cup: Berlin, Dortmund, Munich, Cologne, Stuttgart, Hamburg, Leipzig, Frankfurt, and Gelsenkirchen. Düsseldorf, which was not used in 2006 but had previously been used for the 1974 FIFA World Cup and UEFA Euro 1988, served as the tenth venue; conversely, Hanover, Nuremberg and Kaiserslautern, host cities in 2006 (in addition to 1974 and 1988 in Hanover's case), were not used for this championship. Munich, the site of the first game of UEFA Euro 2024, was also a host city at the multi-national UEFA Euro 2020 tournament, hosting four matches (three involving Germany) in front of a greatly reduced number of spectators due to COVID-19 restrictions. During the tournament, all but Arena AufSchalke were known by different names, mainly due to the stadia sponsorship prohibition.

Various other stadiums, such as those in Bremen and Mönchengladbach, were not selected. The area with the highest number of venues at UEFA Euro 2024 was the Rhine-Ruhr metropolitan region in the state of North Rhine-Westphalia, with four of the ten host cities (Dortmund, Düsseldorf, Gelsenkirchen, and Cologne).

Berlin	Munich	Dortmund	Stuttgart	Gelsenkirchen
Olympiastadion (Olympiastadion Berlin)	Allianz Arena (Munich Football Arena)	Westfalenstadion (BVB Stadion Dortmund)	MHPArena (Stuttgart Arena)	Arena AufSchalke
Capacity: 71,000	Capacity: 66,000	Capacity: 62,000	Capacity: 51,000	Capacity: 50,000
Hamburg	Düsseldorf	Frankfurt	Cologne	Leipzig
Volksparkstadion (Volksparkstadion Hamburg)	Merkur Spiel-Arena (Düsseldorf Arena)	Waldstadion (Frankfurt Arena)	RheinEnergieStadion (Cologne Stadium)	Red Bull Arena (Leipzig Stadium)
Capacity: 49,000	Capacity: 47,000	Capacity: 47,000	Capacity: 43,000	Capacity: 40,000

=== Team base camps ===
Each team chose a "team base camp" for its stay between the matches. The teams trained and resided in these locations throughout the tournament, travelling to games staged away from their bases. The "team base camp" needed to be in Germany.

Base camp and training ground by team—sortable
Team	Base camp	Training ground
Albania	Kamen	SportCentrum Kaiserau
Austria	Berlin	Mommsenstadion
Belgium	Ludwigsburg	Wasenstadion, SGV Freiberg am Neckar
Croatia	Neuruppin	Volksparkstadion, MSV Neuruppin
Czech Republic	Hamburg	Edmund-Plambeck-Stadion, FC Eintracht Norderstedt 03
Denmark	Freudenstadt	Hermann-Saam-Stadion
England	Blankenhain	Golfresort Weimarer Land
France	Bad Lippspringe	Home Deluxe Arena, SC Paderborn 07
Georgia	Velbert	Stadion Velbert, SSVg Velbert
Germany	Herzogenaurach	Adidas Campus/HomeGround
Hungary	Weiler-Simmerberg	Tannenhof Resort, Sport & Spa
Italy	Iserlohn	Hemberg-Stadion
Netherlands	Wolfsburg	AOK Stadion, VfL Wolfsburg (women)
Poland	Hanover	Eilenriedestadion
Portugal	Harsewinkel	Hotel-Residence Klosterpforte Marienfeld / Sports grounds
Romania	Würzburg	Akon Arena, FC Würzburger Kickers
Scotland	Garmisch-Partenkirchen	Stadion am Gröben
Serbia	Augsburg	Rosenaustadion, FC Augsburg (Women)
Slovakia	Mainz	Bruchwegstadion, 1. FSV Mainz 05 (Women)
Slovenia	Wuppertal	Stadion am Zoo, Wuppertaler SV
Spain	Donaueschingen	Der Öschberghof
Switzerland	Stuttgart	Gazi-Stadion auf der Waldau, Stuttgarter Kickers
Turkey	Barsinghausen	Sporthotel Fuchsbachtal
Ukraine	Wiesbaden	Stadion am Halberg

=== Ticketing ===
Tickets for the venues were sold directly by UEFA via its website, or distributed by the football associations of the 24 finalists. Ticket sales started on 3 October 2023. More than 80% of the 2.7 million tickets for the 51 tournament matches were available for the fans of the participating teams and the general public. Fans of each participating team allocated 10,000 tickets for group stage matches, 6,000 tickets for the round of 16 and quarter-finals, 7,000 for the semi-finals, and 10,000 for the final match. Over 50 million applications from 206 countries were received. Besides fans of Germany, most tickets were requested by fans supporting Turkey, Hungary, England, Albania and Croatia. Prices ranged from €30 (for a seat behind the goal at a group match) to €2000 (for a Prime Seat in the main stand at the final).

== Qualification ==
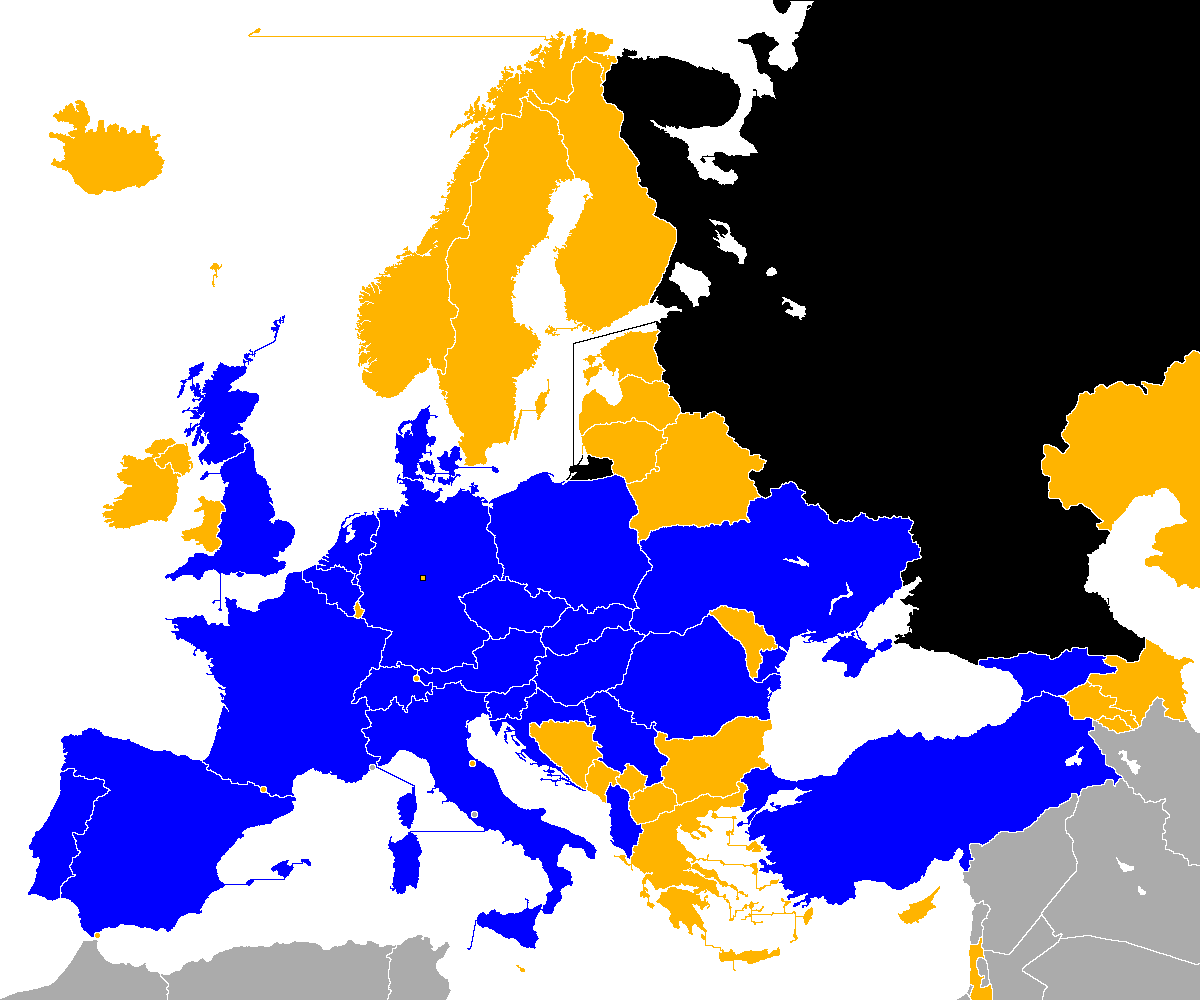
Team qualified for UEFA Euro 2024 Team failed to qualify Team suspended from entering the competition Country not a member of UEFA

As the hosts, Germany qualified for the tournament automatically. The 23 remaining spots were determined by a qualifying tournament; 20 spots were decided by the direct qualification of the winners and runners-up of the 10 qualifying groups, with the remaining three spots decided by play-offs. Places in the play-offs were given to the teams that performed the best in the 2022–23 UEFA Nations League who did not already qualify via the main qualifying tournament. The draw for the UEFA Euro 2024 qualifying group stage was held on 9 October 2022 at the Festhalle in Frankfurt. The qualifying group stage took place from March to November 2023, while the three play-offs were held in March 2024.

=== Qualified teams ===
Of the 24 teams that qualified for the tournament, 19 had participated in the previous edition. These included the defending champions Italy and runners-up England, as well as 2022 World Cup runners-up France and bronze medalist Croatia. Portugal was the only team to qualify with a flawless record, whilst France, England, Belgium, Hungary, and Romania also qualified without a loss.

Albania and Romania returned after missing out on Euro 2020, the former qualifying for only their second major tournament. Serbia and Slovenia both returned for the first time since Euro 2000, with Serbia qualifying for the first time since Serbia and Montenegro became separate nations, and Slovenia qualifying for their fourth major tournament as an independent nation. Georgia beat Greece on penalties in the play-offs to qualify for their first-ever tournament since gaining independence from the Soviet Union in 1991, also becoming the only debutants for this edition and ensuring every final tournament since the inaugural Euro 1960 saw at least one new team make their debut.

Notable absentees included Sweden, Russia, and Wales. Sweden failed to reach the finals for the first time since Euro 1996 and also failed to qualify for their second major tournament in a row, having missed out on the 2022 World Cup. Russia, who were regulars at finals since Euro 2004, were barred from the qualifiers altogether in the aftermath of the country's invasion of Ukraine. Wales, who reached the knockout stages at the previous two editions, including the semi-finals at Euro 2016, lost to Poland on penalties in the play-offs. Having made their debut at the previous edition, both North Macedonia and Finland failed to qualify for this edition.

Team	Qualified as	Qualified on	Previous appearances in tournament (Note: Bold indicates champion for that year. Italic indicates host for that year.)
Germany (Note: From 1972 to 1988, Germany competed as West Germany.)	Host	27 September 2018	13 (**1972**, 1976, **1980**, 1984, 1988, 1992, **1996**, 2000, 2004, 2008, 2012, 2016, 2020)
Belgium	Group F winner	13 October 2023	6 (1972, 1980, 1984, 2000, 2016, 2020)
France	Group B winner	13 October 2023	10 (1960, **1984**, 1992, 1996, **2000**, 2004, 2008, 2012, 2016, 2020)
Portugal	Group J winner	13 October 2023	8 (1984, 1996, 2000, 2004, 2008, 2012, **2016**, 2020)
Scotland	Group A runner-up	15 October 2023	3 (1992, 1996, 2020)
Spain	Group A winner	15 October 2023	11 (**1964**, 1980, 1984, 1988, 1996, 2000, 2004, **2008**, **2012**, 2016, 2020)
Turkey	Group D winner	15 October 2023	5 (1996, 2000, 2008, 2016, 2020)
Austria	Group F runner-up	16 October 2023	3 (2008, 2016, 2020)
England	Group C winner	17 October 2023	10 (1968, 1980, 1988, 1992, 1996, 2000, 2004, 2012, 2016, 2020)
Hungary	Group G winner	16 November 2023	4 (1964, 1972, 2016, 2020)
Slovakia (Note: From 1960 to 1980, both Slovakia and the Czech Republic competed as Czechoslovakia.)	Group J runner-up	16 November 2023	5 (1960, **1976**, 1980, 2016, 2020)
Albania	Group E winner	17 November 2023	1 (2016)
Denmark	Group H winner	17 November 2023	9 (1964, 1984, 1988, **1992**, 1996, 2000, 2004, 2012, 2020)
Netherlands	Group B runner-up	18 November 2023	10 (1976, 1980, **1988**, 1992, 1996, 2000, 2004, 2008, 2012, 2020)
Romania	Group I winner	18 November 2023	5 (1984, 1996, 2000, 2008, 2016)
Switzerland	Group I runner-up	18 November 2023	5 (1996, 2004, 2008, 2016, 2020)
Serbia (Note: From 1960 to 1984, Serbia competed as Yugoslavia, and in 2000 as FR Yugoslavia.)	Group G runner-up	19 November 2023	5 (1960, 1968, 1976, 1984, 2000) (Note: FR Yugoslavia were initially to appear in 1992 (after qualifying as Yugoslavia), but were replaced after being banned by the United Nations from all international sport.)
Czech Republic	Group E runner-up	20 November 2023	10 (1960, **1976**, 1980, 1996, 2000, 2004, 2008, 2012, 2016, 2020)
Italy	Group C runner-up	20 November 2023	10 (**1968**, 1980, 1988, 1996, 2000, 2004, 2008, 2012, 2016, **2020**)
Slovenia	Group H runner-up	20 November 2023	1 (2000)
Croatia	Group D runner-up	21 November 2023	6 (1996, 2004, 2008, 2012, 2016, 2020)
Georgia	Play-off Path C winner	26 March 2024	0 (debut)
Ukraine	Play-off Path B winner	26 March 2024	3 (2012, 2016, 2020)
Poland	Play-off Path A winner	26 March 2024	4 (2008, 2012, 2016, 2020)

==== Disqualification of Russia ====
At a meeting of the UEFA Executive Committee in Hvar, Croatia, on 20 September 2022, it was confirmed that Russia would be excluded from qualifying for Euro 2024, reaffirming the suspension of all Russian teams following the country's invasion of Ukraine in February 2022 and making this the first European Championship finals Russia would miss since 2000.

== Final draw ==
The final tournament draw took place on 2 December 2023, 18:00 CET, at the Elbphilharmonie in Hamburg. The teams were seeded in accordance with the overall European Qualifiers rankings. Hosts Germany were automatically seeded into pot 1, and they were placed in position A1. The three play-off winners were not known at the time of the draw, and the teams participating in those play-offs, scheduled to be held in March 2024, were placed into pot 4 for the draw. The draw was disrupted by various sexual noises whilst it was taking place, as the result of a prankster.

- Pot 1: Germany (Host), group winners ranked 1–5
- Pot 2: Group winners ranked 6–10, group runner-up ranked 1 (6–11 overall)
- Pot 3: Group runners-up ranked 2–7 (12–17 overall)
- Pot 4: Group runners-up ranked 8–10 (18–20 overall), play-off winners A–C (identity unknown at the time of the draw)

=== Seeding ===
Seeding Pot 1
Team	Rank
Germany (hosts)	—N/a
Portugal	1
France	2
Spain	3
Belgium	4
England	5

Seeding Pot 2
Team	Rank
Hungary	6
Turkey	7
Romania	8
Denmark	9
Albania	10
Austria	11

Seeding Pot 3
Team	Rank
Netherlands	12
Scotland	13
Croatia	14
Slovenia	15
Slovakia	16
Czech Republic	17

Seeding Pot 4 (Note: Identity of the three play-off winners was unknown at the time of the draw.)
Team	Rank
Italy	18
Serbia	19
Switzerland	20
Play-off winners A	—N/a
Play-off winners B	—N/a
Play-off winners C	—N/a

=== Draw ===
Group A
Pos	Team
A1	Germany
A2	Scotland
A3	Hungary
A4	Switzerland

Group B
Pos	Team
B1	Spain
B2	Croatia
B3	Italy
B4	Albania

Group C
Pos	Team
C1	Slovenia
C2	Denmark
C3	Serbia
C4	England

Group D
Pos	Team
D1	Poland (Note: Identity of the three play-off winners was unknown at the time of the draw.)
D2	Netherlands
D3	Austria
D4	France

Group E
Pos	Team
E1	Belgium
E2	Slovakia
E3	Romania
E4	Ukraine

Group F
Pos	Team
F1	Turkey
F2	Georgia
F3	Portugal
F4	Czech Republic

== Squads ==
The maximum squad size of the teams was increased from the original quota of 23 to 26 players. Teams had to provide the list containing a minimum of 23 players and a maximum of 26 by the deadline of 7 June.

== Match officials ==
In April 2024, 19 refereeing teams were selected to take charge of the 51 matches at the tournament, including an Argentine team selected as part of a co-operation agreement between the UEFA and CONMEBOL confederations.

Refereeing teams
Country	Referee	Assistant referees	Matches assigned
Argentina	Facundo Tello	Gabriel Chade; Ezequiel Brailovsky	Turkey–Georgia (Group F); Scotland–Hungary (Group A)
England	Michael Oliver	Stuart Burt; Dan Cook	Spain–Croatia (Group B); Slovakia–Ukraine (Group E); Germany–Denmark (Round of 16); Portugal–France (Quarter-finals)
England	Anthony Taylor	Gary Beswick; Adam Nunn	Netherlands–France (Group D); Ukraine–Belgium (Group E); Spain–Germany (Quarter-finals)
France	François Letexier	Cyril Mugnier; Mehdi Rahmouni	Croatia–Albania (Group B); Denmark–Serbia (Group C); Spain–Georgia (Round of 16); Spain–England (Final)
France	Clément Turpin	Nicolas Danos; Benjamin Pagès	Germany–Scotland (Group A); England–Slovenia (Group C); Netherlands–Turkey (Quarter-finals)
Germany	Daniel Siebert	Jan Seidel; Rafael Foltyn	Georgia–Czech Republic (Group F); Slovakia–Romania (Group E)
Germany	Felix Zwayer	Stefan Lupp; Marco Achmüller	Italy–Albania (Group B); Turkey–Portugal (Group F); Romania–Netherlands (Round of 16); Netherlands–England (Semi-finals)
Italy	Marco Guida	Filippo Meli; Giorgio Peretti	Portugal–Czech Republic (Group F); France–Poland (Group D)
Italy	Daniele Orsato	Ciro Carbone; Alessandro Giallatini	Serbia–England (Group C); Switzerland–Germany (Group A); Portugal–Slovenia (Round of 16); England–Switzerland (Quarter-finals)
Netherlands	Danny Makkelie	Hessel Steegstra; Jan de Vries	Germany–Hungary (Group A); Croatia–Italy (Group B)
Poland	Szymon Marciniak	Tomasz Listkiewicz; Adam Kupsik	Belgium–Romania (Group E); Switzerland–Italy (Round of 16)
Portugal	Artur Soares Dias	Paulo Soares; Pedro Ribeiro	Poland–Netherlands (Group D); Denmark–England (Group C); Austria–Turkey (Round of 16)
Romania	István Kovács	Vasile Marinescu; Mihai Ovidiu Artene	Slovenia–Serbia (Group C); Czech Republic–Turkey (Group F)
Slovakia	Ivan Kružliak	Branislav Hancko; Jan Pozor	Scotland–Switzerland (Group A); Netherlands–Austria (Group D)
Slovenia	Slavko Vinčić	Tomaž Klančnik; Andraž Kovačič	Hungary–Switzerland (Group A); Spain–Italy (Group B); Spain–France (Semi-finals)
Spain	Jesús Gil Manzano	Diego Barbero Sevilla; Ángel Nevado Rodríguez	Austria–France (Group D)
Sweden	Glenn Nyberg	Mahbod Beigi; Andreas Söderkvist	Romania–Ukraine (Group E); Albania–Spain (Group B); France–Belgium (Round of 16)
Switzerland	Sandro Schärer	Stéphane de Almeida; Bekim Zogaj	Slovenia–Denmark (Group C); Georgia–Portugal (Group F)
Turkey	Halil Umut Meler	Mustafa Emre Eyisoy; Kerem Ersoy	Belgium–Slovakia (Group E); Poland–Austria (Group D); England–Slovakia (Round of 16)

In addition, UEFA announced twenty video match officials and twelve support match officials (who would act as fourth official or reserve assistant referee).

Video match officials
Country	Referee(s)
England	Stuart Attwell; David Coote
France	Jérôme Brisard; Willy Delajod
Germany	Bastian Dankert; Christian Dingert; Marco Fritz
Italy	Massimiliano Irrati; Paolo Valeri
Netherlands	Rob Dieperink; Pol van Boekel
Poland	Bartosz Frankowski; Tomasz Kwiatkowski
Portugal	Tiago Martins
Romania	Cătălin Popa
Slovenia	Nejc Kajtazovič
Spain	Alejandro Hernández Hernández; Juan Martínez Munuera
Switzerland	Fedayi San
Turkey	Alper Ulusoy

Support match officials
Country	Fourth official	Reserve assistant referee
Bosnia and Herzegovina	Irfan Peljto	Senad Ibrišimbegović
Lithuania	Donatas Rumšas	Aleksandr Radiuš
Netherlands	Serdar Gözübüyük	Johan Balder
Norway	Espen Eskås	Jan Erik Engan
Slovenia	Rade Obrenović	Jure Praprotnik
Ukraine	Mykola Balakin	Oleksandr Berkut

== Group stage ==
Performance of teams participating in UEFA Euro 2024: Winners Runners-up / Semi-finalists Quarter-finalists / Round of 16 Group stage

UEFA announced the tournament schedule on 10 May 2022, which included kick-off times only for the opening match, semi-finals, and final. The kick-off times for all other matches were announced on 2 December 2023 following the draw.

Group winners, runners-up and the best four third-placed teams advanced to the round of 16.

All times are local, CEST (UTC+2).

=== Tiebreakers ===
If two or more teams were equal on points on completion of the group matches, the following tie-breaking criteria were applied:

1. Higher number of points obtained in the matches played between the teams in question;
2. Superior goal difference resulting from the matches played between the teams in question;
3. Higher number of goals scored in the matches played between the teams in question;
4. If, after having applied criteria 1 to 3, teams still have an equal ranking, criteria 1 to 3 are reapplied exclusively to the matches between the teams who are still level to determine their final rankings. (Note: If there is a three-way tie on points, the application of the first three criteria may only break the tie for one of the teams, leaving the other two teams still tied. In this case, the tiebreaking procedure is resumed, from the beginning, for the two teams that are still tied.) If this procedure does not lead to a decision, criteria 5 to 9 will apply;
5. Superior goal difference in all group matches;
6. Higher number of goals scored in all group matches;
7. Lower disciplinary points total in all group matches (1 point for a single yellow card, 3 points for a red card regardless whether it was a direct red card or two yellow cards, 4 points for a yellow card followed by a direct red card);
8. Higher position in the European Qualifiers overall ranking, or drawing of lots if hosts Germany had been involved in the tiebreaker.

However, the normal criteria did not apply if on the last round of the group stage, two teams who were facing each other were tied in points, goal difference and goals scored ended their match in a draw, and no other teams were tied; in that case, their ranking would be determined by a penalty shoot-out.

=== Group A ===
Pos	Team	Pld	W	D	L	GF	GA	GD	Pts	Qualification
1	Germany (H)	3	2	1	0	8	2	+6	7	Advance to knockout stage
2	Switzerland	3	1	2	0	5	3	+2	5	Advance to knockout stage
3	Hungary	3	1	0	2	2	5	−3	3	
4	Scotland	3	0	1	2	2	7	−5	1	

Source: UEFA
(H) Hosts
14 June 2024
21:00

Germany	5–1	Scotland
Wirtz 10'; Musiala 19'; Havertz 45+1' (pen.); Füllkrug 68'; Can 90+3'	Report	Rüdiger 87' (o.g.)

Allianz Arena, Munich
Attendance: 65,052
Referee: Clément Turpin (France)
15 June 2024
15:00

Hungary	1–3	Switzerland
Varga 66'	Report	Duah 12'; Aebischer 45'; Embolo 90+3'

RheinEnergieStadion, Cologne
Attendance: 41,676
Referee: Slavko Vinčić (Slovenia)

19 June 2024
18:00

Germany	2–0	Hungary
Musiala 22'; Gündoğan 67'	Report

MHPArena, Stuttgart
Attendance: 54,000
Referee: Danny Makkelie (Netherlands)
19 June 2024
21:00

Scotland	1–1	Switzerland
McTominay 13'	Report	Shaqiri 26'

RheinEnergieStadion, Cologne
Attendance: 42,711
Referee: Ivan Kružliak (Slovakia)

23 June 2024
21:00

Switzerland	1–1	Germany
Ndoye 28'	Report	Füllkrug 90+2'

Waldstadion, Frankfurt
Attendance: 46,685
Referee: Daniele Orsato (Italy)
23 June 2024
21:00

Scotland	0–1	Hungary
	Report	Csoboth 90+10'

MHPArena, Stuttgart
Attendance: 54,000
Referee: Facundo Tello (Argentina)

=== Group B ===
Pos	Team	Pld	W	D	L	GF	GA	GD	Pts	Qualification
1	Spain	3	3	0	0	5	0	+5	9	Advance to knockout stage
2	Italy	3	1	1	1	3	3	0	4	Advance to knockout stage
3	Croatia	3	0	2	1	3	6	−3	2	
4	Albania	3	0	1	2	3	5	−2	1	

Source: UEFA
15 June 2024
18:00

Spain	3–0	Croatia
Morata 29'; Fabián 32'; Carvajal 45+2'	Report

Olympiastadion, Berlin
Attendance: 68,844
Referee: Michael Oliver (England)
15 June 2024
21:00

Italy	2–1	Albania
Bastoni 11'; Barella 16'	Report	Bajrami 1'

Westfalenstadion, Dortmund
Attendance: 60,512
Referee: Felix Zwayer (Germany)

19 June 2024
15:00

Croatia	2–2	Albania
Kramarić 74'; Gjasula 76' (o.g.)	Report	Laçi 11'; Gjasula 90+5'

Volksparkstadion, Hamburg
Attendance: 46,784
Referee: François Letexier (France)
20 June 2024
21:00

Spain	1–0	Italy
Calafiori 55' (o.g.)	Report

Arena AufSchalke, Gelsenkirchen
Attendance: 49,528
Referee: Slavko Vinčić (Slovenia)

24 June 2024
21:00

Albania	0–1	Spain
	Report	Torres 13'

Merkur Spiel-Arena, Düsseldorf
Attendance: 46,586
Referee: Glenn Nyberg (Sweden)
24 June 2024
21:00

Croatia	1–1	Italy
Modrić 55'	Report	Zaccagni 90+8'

Red Bull Arena, Leipzig
Attendance: 38,322
Referee: Danny Makkelie (Netherlands)

=== Group C ===
Pos	Team	Pld	W	D	L	GF	GA	GD	Pts	Qualification
1	England	3	1	2	0	2	1	+1	5	Advance to knockout stage
2	Denmark	3	0	3	0	2	2	0	3 (Note: Tied on head-to-head result (Slovenia 1–1 Denmark), overall goal difference and overall goals scored. Disciplinary points: Denmark −6, Slovenia −7.)	Advance to knockout stage
3	Slovenia	3	0	3	0	2	2	0	3	Advance to knockout stage
4	Serbia	3	0	2	1	1	2	−1	2	

Source: UEFA
Notes:
16 June 2024
18:00

Slovenia	1–1	Denmark
Janža 77'	Report	Eriksen 17'

MHPArena, Stuttgart
Attendance: 54,000
Referee: Sandro Schärer (Switzerland)
16 June 2024
21:00

Serbia	0–1	England
	Report	Bellingham 13'

Arena AufSchalke, Gelsenkirchen
Attendance: 48,953
Referee: Daniele Orsato (Italy)

20 June 2024
15:00

Slovenia	1–1	Serbia
Karničnik 69'	Report	Jović 90+5'

Allianz Arena, Munich
Attendance: 63,028
Referee: István Kovács (Romania)
20 June 2024
18:00

Denmark	1–1	England
Hjulmand 34'	Report	Kane 18'

Waldstadion, Frankfurt
Attendance: 46,177
Referee: Artur Soares Dias (Portugal)

25 June 2024
21:00

England	0–0	Slovenia
	Report

RheinEnergieStadion, Cologne
Attendance: 41,536
Referee: Clément Turpin (France)
25 June 2024
21:00

Denmark	0–0	Serbia
	Report

Allianz Arena, Munich
Attendance: 64,288
Referee: François Letexier (France)

=== Group D ===
Pos	Team	Pld	W	D	L	GF	GA	GD	Pts	Qualification
1	Austria	3	2	0	1	6	4	+2	6	Advance to knockout stage
2	France	3	1	2	0	2	1	+1	5	Advance to knockout stage
3	Netherlands	3	1	1	1	4	4	0	4	Advance to knockout stage
4	Poland	3	0	1	2	3	6	−3	1	

Source: UEFA
16 June 2024
15:00

Poland	1–2	Netherlands
Buksa 16'	Report	Gakpo 29'; Weghorst 83'

Volksparkstadion, Hamburg
Attendance: 48,117
Referee: Artur Soares Dias (Portugal)
17 June 2024
21:00

Austria	0–1	France
	Report	Wöber 38' (o.g.)

Merkur Spiel-Arena, Düsseldorf
Attendance: 46,425
Referee: Jesús Gil Manzano (Spain)

21 June 2024
18:00

Poland	1–3	Austria
Piątek 30'	Report	Trauner 9'; Baumgartner 66'; Arnautović 78' (pen.)

Olympiastadion, Berlin
Attendance: 69,455
Referee: Halil Umut Meler (Turkey)
21 June 2024
21:00

Netherlands	0–0	France
	Report

Red Bull Arena, Leipzig
Attendance: 38,531
Referee: Anthony Taylor (England)

25 June 2024
18:00

Netherlands	2–3	Austria
Gakpo 47'; Depay 75'	Report	Malen 6' (o.g.); Schmid 59'; Sabitzer 80'

Olympiastadion, Berlin
Attendance: 68,363
Referee: Ivan Kružliak (Slovakia)
25 June 2024
18:00

France	1–1	Poland
Mbappé 56' (pen.)	Report	Lewandowski 79' (pen.)

Westfalenstadion, Dortmund
Attendance: 59,728
Referee: Marco Guida (Italy)

=== Group E ===
Pos	Team	Pld	W	D	L	GF	GA	GD	Pts	Qualification
1	Romania	3	1	1	1	4	3	+1	4	Advance to knockout stage
2	Belgium	3	1	1	1	2	1	+1	4	Advance to knockout stage
3	Slovakia	3	1	1	1	3	3	0	4	Advance to knockout stage
4	Ukraine	3	1	1	1	2	4	−2	4	

Source: UEFA
17 June 2024
15:00

Romania	3–0	Ukraine
Stanciu 29'; R. Marin 53'; Drăguș 57'	Report

Allianz Arena, Munich
Attendance: 61,591
Referee: Glenn Nyberg (Sweden)
17 June 2024
18:00

Belgium	0–1	Slovakia
	Report	Schranz 7'

Waldstadion, Frankfurt
Attendance: 45,181
Referee: Halil Umut Meler (Turkey)

21 June 2024
15:00

Slovakia	1–2	Ukraine
Schranz 17'	Report	Shaparenko 54'; Yaremchuk 80'

Merkur Spiel-Arena, Düsseldorf
Attendance: 43,910
Referee: Michael Oliver (England)
22 June 2024
21:00

Belgium	2–0	Romania
Tielemans 2'; De Bruyne 80'	Report

RheinEnergieStadion, Cologne
Attendance: 42,535
Referee: Szymon Marciniak (Poland)

26 June 2024
18:00

Slovakia	1–1	Romania
Duda 24'	Report	R. Marin 37' (pen.)

Waldstadion, Frankfurt
Attendance: 45,033
Referee: Daniel Siebert (Germany)
26 June 2024
18:00

Ukraine	0–0	Belgium
	Report

MHPArena, Stuttgart
Attendance: 54,000
Referee: Anthony Taylor (England)

=== Group F ===
Pos	Team	Pld	W	D	L	GF	GA	GD	Pts	Qualification
1	Portugal	3	2	0	1	5	3	+2	6 (Note: Head-to-head result: Turkey 0–3 Portugal.)	Advance to knockout stage
2	Turkey	3	2	0	1	5	5	0	6	Advance to knockout stage
3	Georgia	3	1	1	1	4	4	0	4	Advance to knockout stage
4	Czech Republic	3	0	1	2	3	5	−2	1	

Source: UEFA
Notes:
18 June 2024
18:00

Turkey	3–1	Georgia
Müldür 25'; Güler 65'; Aktürkoğlu 90+7'	Report	Mikautadze 32'

Westfalenstadion, Dortmund
Attendance: 59,127
Referee: Facundo Tello (Argentina)
18 June 2024
21:00

Portugal	2–1	Czech Republic
Hranáč 69' (o.g.); Conceição 90+2'	Report	Provod 62'

Red Bull Arena, Leipzig
Attendance: 38,421
Referee: Marco Guida (Italy)

22 June 2024
15:00

Georgia	1–1	Czech Republic
Mikautadze 45+4' (pen.)	Report	Schick 59'

Volksparkstadion, Hamburg
Attendance: 46,524
Referee: Daniel Siebert (Germany)
22 June 2024
18:00

Turkey	0–3	Portugal
	Report	B. Silva 21'; Akaydin 28' (o.g.); Fernandes 56'

Westfalenstadion, Dortmund
Attendance: 61,047
Referee: Felix Zwayer (Germany)

26 June 2024
21:00

Georgia	2–0	Portugal
Kvaratskhelia 2'; Mikautadze 57' (pen.)	Report

Arena AufSchalke, Gelsenkirchen
Attendance: 49,616
Referee: Sandro Schärer (Switzerland)
26 June 2024
21:00

Czech Republic	1–2	Turkey
Souček 66'	Report	Çalhanoğlu 51'; Tosun 90+4'

Volksparkstadion, Hamburg
Attendance: 47,683
Referee: István Kovács (Romania)

=== Ranking of third-placed teams ===
Pos	Grp	Team	Pld	W	D	L	GF	GA	GD	Pts	Qualification
1	D	Netherlands	3	1	1	1	4	4	0	4 (Note: Disciplinary points: Netherlands −2, Georgia −6.)	Advance to knockout stage
2	F	Georgia	3	1	1	1	4	4	0	4	Advance to knockout stage
3	E	Slovakia	3	1	1	1	3	3	0	4	Advance to knockout stage
4	C	Slovenia	3	0	3	0	2	2	0	3	Advance to knockout stage
5	A	Hungary	3	1	0	2	2	5	−3	3	
6	B	Croatia	3	0	2	1	3	6	−3	2	

Source: UEFA
Rules for classification: 1) Points; 2) Goal difference; 3) Goals scored; 4) Wins; 5) Lower disciplinary points total; 6) European Qualifiers overall ranking (or drawing of lots, if hosts Germany had been involved in the tiebreaker).

== Knockout stage ==
In the knockout stage, if a match was level at the end of normal playing time, extra time was played (two periods of 15 minutes each). If still tied after extra time, the match was decided by a penalty shoot-out.

As with every tournament since UEFA Euro 1984, there was no third place play-off.

All times listed are Central European Summer Time (UTC+2)

=== Bracket ===
Round of 16
30 June – Cologne
Spain	4
Georgia	1
29 June – Dortmund
Germany	2
Denmark	0
1 July – Frankfurt
Portugal (p)	0 (3)
Slovenia	0 (0)
1 July – Düsseldorf
France	1
Belgium	0
2 July – Munich
Romania	0
Netherlands	3
2 July – Leipzig
Austria	1
Turkey	2
30 June – Gelsenkirchen
England (a.e.t.)	2
Slovakia	1
29 June – Berlin
Switzerland	2
Italy	0

Quarter-finals
5 July – Stuttgart
Spain (a.e.t.)	2
Germany	1
5 July – Hamburg
Portugal	0 (3)
France (p)	0 (5)
6 July – Berlin
Netherlands	2
Turkey	1
6 July – Düsseldorf
England (p)	1 (5)
Switzerland	1 (3)

Semi-finals
9 July – Munich
Spain	2
France	1
10 July – Dortmund
Netherlands	1
England	2

Final
14 July – Berlin
Spain	2
England	1

=== Round of 16 ===
29 June 2024
18:00

Switzerland	2–0	Italy
Freuler 37'; Vargas 46'	Report

Olympiastadion, Berlin
Attendance: 68,172
Referee: Szymon Marciniak (Poland)

29 June 2024
21:00

Germany	2–0	Denmark
Havertz 53' (pen.); Musiala 68'	Report

Westfalenstadion, Dortmund
Attendance: 61,612
Referee: Michael Oliver (England)

30 June 2024
18:00

England	2–1 (a.e.t.)	Slovakia
Bellingham 90+5'; Kane 91'	Report	Schranz 25'

Arena AufSchalke, Gelsenkirchen
Attendance: 47,244
Referee: Halil Umut Meler (Turkey)

30 June 2024
21:00

Spain	4–1	Georgia
Rodri 39'; Fabián 51'; Williams 75'; Olmo 83'	Report	Le Normand 18' (o.g.)

RheinEnergieStadion, Cologne
Attendance: 42,233
Referee: François Letexier (France)

1 July 2024
18:00

France	1–0	Belgium
Vertonghen 85' (o.g.)	Report

Merkur Spiel-Arena, Düsseldorf
Attendance: 46,810
Referee: Glenn Nyberg (Sweden)

1 July 2024
21:00

Portugal	0–0 (a.e.t.)	Slovenia
	Report
Penalties
Ronaldo (penalty scored); Fernandes (penalty scored); B. Silva (penalty scored)	3–0	(penalty missed) Iličić; (penalty missed) Balkovec; (penalty missed) Verbič

Waldstadion, Frankfurt
Attendance: 46,576
Referee: Daniele Orsato (Italy)

2 July 2024
18:00

Romania	0–3	Netherlands
	Report	Gakpo 20'; Malen 83', 90+3'

Allianz Arena, Munich
Attendance: 65,012
Referee: Felix Zwayer (Germany)

2 July 2024
21:00

Austria	1–2	Turkey
Gregoritsch 66'	Report	Demiral 1', 59'

Red Bull Arena, Leipzig
Attendance: 38,305
Referee: Artur Soares Dias (Portugal)

=== Quarter-finals ===
5 July 2024
18:00

Spain	2–1 (a.e.t.)	Germany
Olmo 51'; Merino 119'	Report	Wirtz 89'

MHPArena, Stuttgart
Attendance: 54,000
Referee: Anthony Taylor (England)

5 July 2024
21:00

Portugal	0–0 (a.e.t.)	France
	Report
Penalties
Ronaldo (penalty scored); B. Silva (penalty scored); Félix (penalty missed); Mendes (penalty scored)	3–5	(penalty scored) Dembélé; (penalty scored) Fofana; (penalty scored) Koundé; (penalty scored) Barcola; (penalty scored) Hernandez

Volksparkstadion, Hamburg
Attendance: 47,789
Referee: Michael Oliver (England)

6 July 2024
18:00

England	1–1 (a.e.t.)	Switzerland
Saka 80'	Report	Embolo 75'
Penalties
Palmer (penalty scored); Bellingham (penalty scored); Saka (penalty scored); Toney (penalty scored); Alexander-Arnold (penalty scored)	5–3	(penalty missed) Akanji; (penalty scored) Schär; (penalty scored) Shaqiri; (penalty scored) Amdouni

Merkur Spiel-Arena, Düsseldorf
Attendance: 46,907
Referee: Daniele Orsato (Italy)

6 July 2024
21:00

Netherlands	2–1	Turkey
De Vrij 70'; Müldür 76' (o.g.)	Report	Akaydin 35'

Olympiastadion, Berlin
Attendance: 70,091
Referee: Clément Turpin (France)

=== Semi-finals ===
9 July 2024
21:00

Spain	2–1	France
Yamal 21'; Olmo 25'	Report	Kolo Muani 9'

Allianz Arena, Munich
Attendance: 62,042
Referee: Slavko Vinčić (Slovenia)

10 July 2024
21:00

Netherlands	1–2	England
Simons 7'	Report	Kane 18' (pen.); Watkins 90'

Westfalenstadion, Dortmund
Attendance: 60,926
Referee: Felix Zwayer (Germany)

=== Final ===
14 July 2024
21:00

Spain	2–1	England
Williams 47'; Oyarzabal 86'	Report	Palmer 73'

Olympiastadion, Berlin
Attendance: 65,600
Referee: François Letexier (France)

== Statistics ==
=== Goalscorers ===
There were 117 goals scored in 51 matches, for an average of 2.29 goals per match.

3 goals

- (England) Harry Kane
- (Georgia (country)) Georges Mikautadze
- (Germany) Jamal Musiala
- (Netherlands) Cody Gakpo
- (Slovakia) Ivan Schranz
- (Spain) Dani Olmo

2 goals

- (England) Jude Bellingham
- (Germany) Niclas Füllkrug
- (Germany) Kai Havertz
- (Germany) Florian Wirtz
- (Netherlands) Donyell Malen
- (Romania) Răzvan Marin
- (Spain) Fabián Ruiz
- (Spain) Nico Williams
- (Switzerland) Breel Embolo
- (Turkey) Merih Demiral

1 goal

- (Albania) Nedim Bajrami
- (Albania) Klaus Gjasula
- (Albania) Qazim Laçi
- (Austria) Marko Arnautović
- (Austria) Christoph Baumgartner
- (Austria) Michael Gregoritsch
- (Austria) Marcel Sabitzer
- (Austria) Romano Schmid
- (Austria) Gernot Trauner
- (Belgium) Kevin De Bruyne
- (Belgium) Youri Tielemans
- (Croatia) Andrej Kramarić
- (Croatia) Luka Modrić
- (Czech Republic) Lukáš Provod
- (Czech Republic) Patrik Schick
- (Czech Republic) Tomáš Souček
- (Denmark) Christian Eriksen
- (Denmark) Morten Hjulmand
- (England) Cole Palmer
- (England) Bukayo Saka
- (England) Ollie Watkins
- (France) Randal Kolo Muani
- (France) Kylian Mbappé
- (Georgia (country)) Khvicha Kvaratskhelia
- (Germany) Emre Can
- (Germany) İlkay Gündoğan
- (Hungary) Kevin Csoboth
- (Hungary) Barnabás Varga
- (Italy) Nicolò Barella
- (Italy) Alessandro Bastoni
- (Italy) Mattia Zaccagni
- (Netherlands) Memphis Depay
- (Netherlands) Xavi Simons
- (Netherlands) Stefan de Vrij
- (Netherlands) Wout Weghorst
- (Poland) Adam Buksa
- (Poland) Robert Lewandowski
- (Poland) Krzysztof Piątek
- (Portugal) Francisco Conceição
- (Portugal) Bruno Fernandes
- (Portugal) Bernardo Silva
- (Romania) Denis Drăguș
- (Romania) Nicolae Stanciu
- (Scotland) Scott McTominay
- (Serbia) Luka Jović
- (Slovakia) Ondrej Duda
- (Slovenia) Erik Janža
- (Slovenia) Žan Karničnik
- (Spain) Dani Carvajal
- (Spain) Mikel Merino
- (Spain) Álvaro Morata
- (Spain) Mikel Oyarzabal
- (Spain) Rodri
- (Spain) Ferran Torres
- (Spain) Lamine Yamal
- (Switzerland) Michel Aebischer
- (Switzerland) Kwadwo Duah
- (Switzerland) Remo Freuler
- (Switzerland) Dan Ndoye
- (Switzerland) Xherdan Shaqiri
- (Switzerland) Rubén Vargas
- (Turkey) Samet Akaydin
- (Turkey) Kerem Aktürkoğlu
- (Turkey) Hakan Çalhanoğlu
- (Turkey) Arda Güler
- (Turkey) Mert Müldür
- (Turkey) Cenk Tosun
- (Ukraine) Mykola Shaparenko
- (Ukraine) Roman Yaremchuk

1 own goal

- (Albania) Klaus Gjasula (against Croatia)
- (Austria) Maximilian Wöber (against France)
- (Belgium) Jan Vertonghen (against France)
- (Czech Republic) Robin Hranáč (against Portugal)
- (Germany) Antonio Rüdiger (against Scotland)
- (Italy) Riccardo Calafiori (against Spain)
- (Netherlands) Donyell Malen (against Austria)
- (Spain) Robin Le Normand (against Georgia)
- (Turkey) Samet Akaydin (against Portugal)
- (Turkey) Mert Müldür (against Netherlands)

Source: UEFA

=== Awards ===

The Team of the Tournament, chosen by UEFA

UEFA Team of the Tournament

UEFA's technical observer team was given the objective of naming a team of the best eleven players from the tournament. Six players from the winning Spanish squad were named in the team.

UEFA Team of the Tournament
Goalkeeper	Defenders	Midfielders	Forwards
(France) Mike Maignan	(England) Kyle Walker (Switzerland) Manuel Akanji (France) William Saliba (Spain) Marc Cucurella	(Spain) Dani Olmo (Spain) Rodri (Spain) Fabián Ruiz	(Spain) Lamine Yamal (Germany) Jamal Musiala (Spain) Nico Williams

Player of the Tournament

The Player of the Tournament award was given to Rodri, who was chosen by UEFA's technical observers.

- (Spain) Rodri

Young Player of the Tournament

The Young Player of the Tournament award, open to players born on or after 1 January 2002, was given to Lamine Yamal, as chosen by UEFA's technical observers.

- (Spain) Lamine Yamal – 13 July 2007 (aged 17)

Top Scorer

Unlike in previous editions, the "Alipay Top Scorer" award, given to the top scorer of the tournament, was allowed to be shared among multiple players, whereas previous installments used assists and minutes played as tiebreakers. The award was thus given to each of the six players who scored three goals in the tournament: Cody Gakpo, Harry Kane, Georges Mikautadze, Jamal Musiala, Dani Olmo, and Ivan Schranz.

- (Netherlands) Cody Gakpo
- (England) Harry Kane
- (Georgia (country)) Georges Mikautadze
- (Germany) Jamal Musiala
- (Spain) Dani Olmo
- (Slovakia) Ivan Schranz

(3 goals each)

Goal of the Tournament

The Goal of the Tournament was decided by a panel of UEFA technical observers. On 16 July 2024, UEFA announced that Spanish winger Lamine Yamal's semi-final goal against France had been chosen as the best goal of the tournament.

- (Spain) Lamine Yamal (goal vs France)

Prior announcing Yamal's goal as the Goal of the Tournament, UEFA published an extensive list of goals nominated for the award.

The following three goals, according to UEFA's ranking, were:

- (England) Jude Bellingham (goal vs Slovakia during the round of 16)
- (Switzerland) Xherdan Shaqiri (goal vs Scotland during the group stage)
- (Romania) Nicolae Stanciu (goal vs Ukraine during the group stage)

Fans' Goal of the Tournament

The Fans' Goal of the Tournament was decided by online voting. A total 10 goals were in the shortlist, chosen by UEFA technical observers. On 20 July 2024, after an open vote on the official Euro 2024 website, UEFA announced that Turkish defender Mert Müldür's group stage goal against Georgia had been chosen as the fans' goal of the tournament.

- (Turkey) Mert Müldür (goal vs (Georgia (country)) Georgia)

=== Discipline ===
A player or team official was automatically suspended for the next match for the following offences:

- Receiving a red card (red card suspensions could be extended for serious offences)
- Receiving two yellow cards in two different matches; (Note: As yellow cards are not carried forward to penalty shoot-outs, players may be shown two yellow cards in the same fixture without being sent off. However, this would result in a suspension for accumulating two yellow cards during the tournament.) yellow cards expired after the completion of the quarter-finals (yellow card suspensions were not carried forward to any other future international matches)

Players suspended during the tournament—sortable
Player	Offence(s)	Suspension(s)
(Georgia (country)) Giorgi Loria	(red card) in qualifying vs Greece (26 March 2024)	Group F vs Turkey (matchday 1; 18 June 2024)
(Scotland) Ryan Porteous	(red card) in Group A vs Germany (matchday 1; 14 June 2024)	Group A vs Switzerland (matchday 2; 19 June 2024); Group A vs Hungary (matchday 3; 23 June 2024)
(Albania) Mirlind Daku (Note: Daku was handed a two-match ban, with the second match of the suspension served outside the tournament.)	Nationalist chants following Group B vs Croatia (matchday 2; 19 June 2024)	Group B vs Spain (matchday 3; 24 June 2024)
(Spain) Rodri	(yellow card) in Group B vs Croatia (matchday 1; 15 June 2024); (yellow card) in Group B vs Italy (matchday 2; 20 June 2024)	Group B vs Albania (matchday 3; 24 June 2024)
(Belgium) Dodi Lukebakio	(yellow card) in Group E vs Slovakia (matchday 1; 17 June 2024); (yellow card) in Group E vs Romania (matchday 2; 22 June 2024)	Group E vs Ukraine (matchday 3; 26 June 2024)
(Portugal) Rafael Leão	(yellow card) in Group F vs Czech Republic (matchday 1; 18 June 2024); (yellow card) in Group F vs Turkey (matchday 2; 22 June 2024)	Group F vs Georgia (matchday 3; 26 June 2024)
(Turkey) Abdülkerim Bardakcı	(yellow card) in Group F vs Georgia (matchday 1; 18 June 2024); (yellow card) in Group F vs Portugal (matchday 2; 22 June 2024)	Group F vs Czech Republic (matchday 3; 26 June 2024)
(Germany) Jonathan Tah	(yellow card) in Group A vs Scotland (matchday 1; 14 June 2024); (yellow card) in Group A vs Switzerland (matchday 3; 23 June 2024)	Round of 16 vs Denmark (29 June 2024)
(Switzerland) Silvan Widmer	(yellow card) in Group A vs Hungary (matchday 1; 15 June 2024); (yellow card) in Group A vs Germany (matchday 3; 23 June 2024)	Round of 16 vs Italy (29 June 2024)
(Italy) Riccardo Calafiori	(yellow card) in Group B vs Albania (matchday 1; 15 June 2024); (yellow card) in Group B vs Croatia (matchday 3; 24 June 2024)	Round of 16 vs Switzerland (29 June 2024)
(Austria) Patrick Wimmer	(yellow card) in Group D vs Poland (matchday 2; 21 June 2024); (yellow card) in Group D vs Netherlands (matchday 3; 25 June 2024)	Round of 16 vs Turkey (2 July 2024)
(Denmark) Morten Hjulmand	(yellow card) in Group C vs Slovenia (matchday 1; 16 June 2024); (yellow card) in Group C vs Serbia (matchday 3; 25 June 2024)	Round of 16 vs Germany (29 June 2024)
(Slovenia) Erik Janža	(yellow card) in Group C vs Serbia (matchday 2; 20 June 2024); (yellow card) in Group C vs England (matchday 3; 25 June 2024)	Round of 16 vs Portugal (1 July 2024)
(Romania) Nicușor Bancu	(yellow card) in Group E vs Belgium (matchday 2; 22 June 2024); (yellow card) in Group E vs Slovakia (matchday 3; 26 June 2024)	Round of 16 vs Netherlands (2 July 2024)
(Czech Republic) Antonín Barák	(yellow card) (yellow-red card) in Group F vs Turkey (matchday 3; 26 June 2024)	Suspension served outside the tournament
(Czech Republic) Tomáš Chorý	(red card) in Group F vs Turkey (matchday 3; 26 June 2024)	Suspension served outside the tournament
(Georgia (country)) Anzor Mekvabishvili	(yellow card) in Group F vs Czech Republic (matchday 2; 22 June 2024); (yellow card) in Group F vs Portugal (matchday 3; 26 June 2024)	Round of 16 vs Spain (30 June 2024)
(Turkey) Samet Akaydin	(yellow card) in Group F vs Portugal (matchday 2; 22 June 2024); (yellow card) in Group F vs Czech Republic (matchday 3; 26 June 2024)	Round of 16 vs Austria (2 July 2024)
(Turkey) Hakan Çalhanoğlu	(yellow card) in Group F vs Georgia (matchday 1; 18 June 2024); (yellow card) in Group F vs Czech Republic (matchday 3; 26 June 2024)	Round of 16 vs Austria (2 July 2024)
(England) Marc Guéhi	(yellow card) in Group C vs Slovenia (matchday 3; 25 June 2024); (yellow card) in Round of 16 vs Slovakia (30 June 2024)	Quarter-finals vs Switzerland (6 July 2024)
(France) Adrien Rabiot	(yellow card) in Group D vs Poland (matchday 3; 25 June 2024); (yellow card) in Round of 16 vs Belgium (1 July 2024)	Quarter-finals vs Portugal (5 July 2024)
(Slovenia) Matjaž Kek (manager)	(red card) in Round of 16 vs Portugal (1 July 2024)	Suspension served outside the tournament
(Turkey) Orkun Kökçü	(yellow card) in Group F vs Czech Republic (matchday 3; 26 June 2024); (yellow card) in Round of 16 vs Austria (2 July 2024)	Quarter-finals vs Netherlands (6 July 2024)
(Turkey) İsmail Yüksek	(yellow card) in Group F vs Czech Republic (matchday 3; 26 June 2024); (yellow card) in Round of 16 vs Austria (2 July 2024)	Quarter-finals vs Netherlands (6 July 2024)
(Turkey) Merih Demiral (Note: Demiral was handed a two-match ban, with the second match of the suspension served outside the tournament.)	Nationalist hand symbol in Round of 16 vs Austria (2 July 2024)	Quarter-finals vs Netherlands (6 July 2024)
(Spain) Dani Carvajal	(yellow card) (yellow-red card) in Quarter-finals vs Germany (5 July 2024)	Semi-finals vs France (9 July 2024)
(Spain) Robin Le Normand	(yellow card) in Group B vs Italy (matchday 2; 20 June 2024); (yellow card) in Quarter-finals vs Germany (5 July 2024)	Semi-finals vs France (9 July 2024)
(Turkey) Bertuğ Yıldırım	(red card) in Quarter-finals vs Netherlands (6 July 2024)	Suspension served outside the tournament

=== Prize money ===
The prize money was finalised on 2 December 2023. Each team received a participation fee of €9.25 million, with the winner able to earn a maximum of €28.25 million.

Prize money
Rank (unoff.)	Team	€ million
1	Spain	28.25
2	England	24.25
3	France	19.25
4	Netherlands	18.75
5	Germany	15.75
6	Portugal; Turkey; Switzerland	15.25
9	Austria	12.75
10	Romania; Belgium; Georgia; Italy; Slovakia; Denmark; Slovenia	12.25
17	Ukraine	10.75
18	Hungary; Serbia; Croatia	10.25
21	Albania; Czech Republic; Poland; Scotland	9.75

Prize money by round achieved
Round achieved	Amount	Number of teams
Final tournament	€9.25m	24
Group stage	€1m for a win €500,000 for a draw	24
Round of 16	€1.5m	16
Quarter-finals	€2.5m	8
Semi-finals	€4m	4
Runner-up	€5m	1
Winner	€8m	1

=== Records ===
- After securing a record fourth title, Spain became the first European Championship winners to win all their group matches twice (having done so previously in 2008), with France (1984) and Italy (2021) the only other teams to have achieved this once. This statistic refers to the European Championship since 1980, with the inclusion of the group stage.
- Spain also became the first European team to win all seven matches at European championship without needing a penalty shoot-out. France also won every match without needing a penalty shoot-out in 1984, albeit while playing only five matches.
- Spain's 15 goals broke the record for most goals scored by a team at a single European Championship. The record was previously held by France, scoring 14 goals in 1984. Ten different players scored for Spain, another record.
- England became the first team to lose back to back European Championship finals, while Gareth Southgate became the first manager to lose back to back finals in either the World Cup or European Championships.
- By taking charge of Germany's tournament opener against Scotland, Julian Nagelsmann became the youngest head coach to manage a match at the European Championship at the age of 36 years and 327 days, surpassing the previous record set in 2000 by Slovenia coach Srečko Katanec by six days.
- Lamine Yamal became the youngest player to play at a UEFA European Championship aged 16 years and 338 days old, after featuring for Spain in their opening match against Croatia. The previous youngest player was Poland's Kacper Kozłowski, aged 17 years and 246 days in 2021.
- With his goal in Spain's semi-final against France, Yamal then became the youngest goalscorer in the history of the European Championship, aged 16 years and 362 days. The previous youngest was Switzerland's Johan Vonlanthen, aged 18 years and 141 days in 2004, also against France.
- Yamal's appearance in the final, one day after his 17th birthday, also made him the youngest player to both appear in and also win a UEFA European Championship final. Previously, the youngest player to both appear in and also win a UEFA European Championship final was Portugal's Renato Sanches, in 2016, aged 18 years and 328 days.
- Nedim Bajrami set the record for fastest goal scored in European Championship history, scoring in Albania's opener against Italy after just 23 seconds. This shattered the previous record of 67 seconds, set by Russia's Dmitri Kirichenko in 2004. Kirichenko's goal was then pushed into third place following Merih Demiral's goal for Turkey against Austria in the round of 16, coming after only 58 seconds. The fourth-fastest goal was also recorded, when Youri Tielemans scored for Belgium against Romania after only 74 seconds.
- Portugal's Pepe became the oldest player to make an appearance at the European Championship, aged 41 years and 130 days in his side's quarter-final match against France. Hungary goalkeeper Gabor Király, the previous record holder, was aged 40 years and 86 days when he faced Belgium in the round of 16 in 2016. Before Pepe, the oldest outfield player was Lothar Matthäus, who won his 150th and final cap for Germany aged 39 years and 91 days in 2000.
- Cristiano Ronaldo extended his own record for the most tournaments featured in, appearing in his sixth European Championship.
- Luka Modrić became the oldest player to score a goal at the European Championship, aged 38 years and 289 days in Croatia's group stage match against Italy. The previous record was held by Austria's Ivica Vastić, who was 38 years and 257 days old when he scored against Poland in 2008.
- Kevin Csoboth set the record for the latest regulation time goal in tournament history, scoring for Hungary against Scotland in the 10th minute after the 90-minute mark.
- The final Group F game between Czech Republic and Turkey broke the record for the most number of cards shown in total in a single match. 19 cards (17 yellow and 2 red) were shown (Czech Republic receiving 7 of them and Turkey 12), surpassing the previous record of 10 shown in the Euro 2016 final between Portugal and France.
- Portuguese goalkeeper Diogo Costa made three saves in the round of 16 penalty shoot-out against Slovenia, breaking the European Championship record for most saves in one penalty shoot-out, while Slovenia became the first team in European Championship history to miss all of their penalties.

== Marketing ==
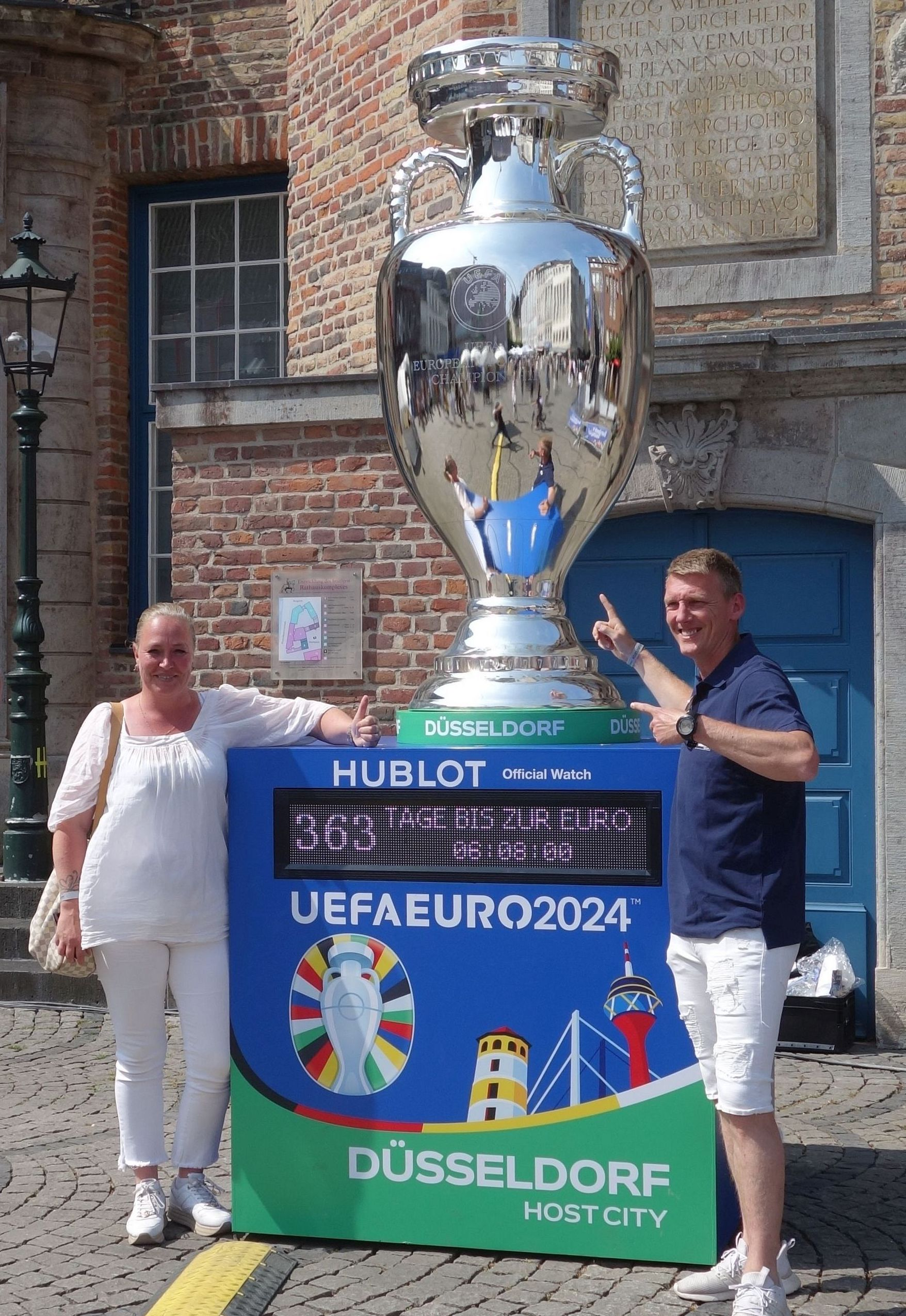
Countdown clock for UEFA Euro 2024 in front of Düsseldorf City Hall

=== Branding ===
The official logo was unveiled on 5 October 2021, during a ceremony at the Olympiastadion in Berlin. The logo depicted the Henri Delaunay Trophy with 24 coloured slices around the trophy representing the 24 participating nations, and the ellipse reflected the shape of the Olympiastadion. The coloured slices also represent the flags of all 55 UEFA member nations. In addition, each of the ten host cities had their own unique logo, featuring the following local sights:

- Berlin: Brandenburg Gate
- Cologne: Cologne Cathedral
- Dortmund: Dortmund U-Tower
- Düsseldorf: Schlossturm, Rheinturm and Rheinkniebrücke
- Frankfurt: Römer
- Gelsenkirchen: Musiktheater im Revier
- Hamburg: Elbphilharmonie
- Leipzig: Monument to the Battle of the Nations
- Munich: Frauenkirche
- Stuttgart: Fernsehturm Stuttgart

The official slogan of the tournament was "United by Football. [German:] Vereint im Herzen Europas " (English: United in the heart of Europe). The slogan was chosen to promote diversity and inclusion.

=== Merchandise ===
In November 2023, it was announced that EA Sports had picked up the rights for the UEFA Euro 2024 video game, and that the Euro 2024 downloadable update would be coming to EA Sports FC 24, EA Sports FC Mobile, and EA Sports FC Online in the summer of 2024. Released on 11 June, the update featured a full tournament mode, local and online friendlies, and a Euro-themed single player career mode, called "Lead Your Nation", each including all of the teams, players, and tournament venues.

From Euro 2024, Fanatics would be controlling the e-commerce, event retail and licensing of UEFA National Team competitions until Euro 2028.

Topps, also owned by Fanatics, was the official sticker and trading card partner of the tournament, marking the end of Panini's association with UEFA which began in 1976. Stickers were produced for all the Euro 2024 teams, including the teams that did not qualify for the qualifying play-offs. These stickers could be sold, collected or traded.

=== Official song ===
In December 2023, Italian DJ group Meduza, American pop rock band OneRepublic and German singer Kim Petras were all announced as the official music artists of the tournament. However, in March 2024, it was announced that Petras had withdrawn from production due to scheduling issues, and was replaced by German singer Leony. The official song, "Fire", was released on 10 May 2024. It was performed live by the three music artists at the tournament's closing ceremony before the final on 14 July 2024.

=== Broadcasting rights ===
The International Broadcast Centre (IBC) was located at the halls of the Leipzig Trade Fair in Leipzig, Germany.

Unlike the previous two tournaments, UEFA discontinued 4K ultra-high-definition broadcasts due to technical constraints, and amid lukewarm interest in the format among European broadcasters in comparison to high-dynamic-range (HDR) colour.

=== Sponsorship ===
UEFA, in collaboration with AIM Sport, used virtual advertising for the first time in the history of Euros, having three different types of sponsorship besides the Global sponsors, one pack for Germany, one for the United States and another for the Chinese market.

Official global sponsors

- Adidas
- Alibaba Group (Alipay, AliExpress, Antom and WorldFirst brands)
- Atos
- Betano
- Booking.com
- BYD Auto
- Coca-Cola
- Engelbert Strauss
- Hisense
- Lidl
- Qatar Airways
- Unilever
- Visit Qatar
- Vivo Mobile

Official Germany national sponsors

- Bitburger Brewery
- Deutsche Bahn
- Deutsche Telekom
- Ergo Group
- Wiesenhof

== Symbols ==
=== Mascot ===
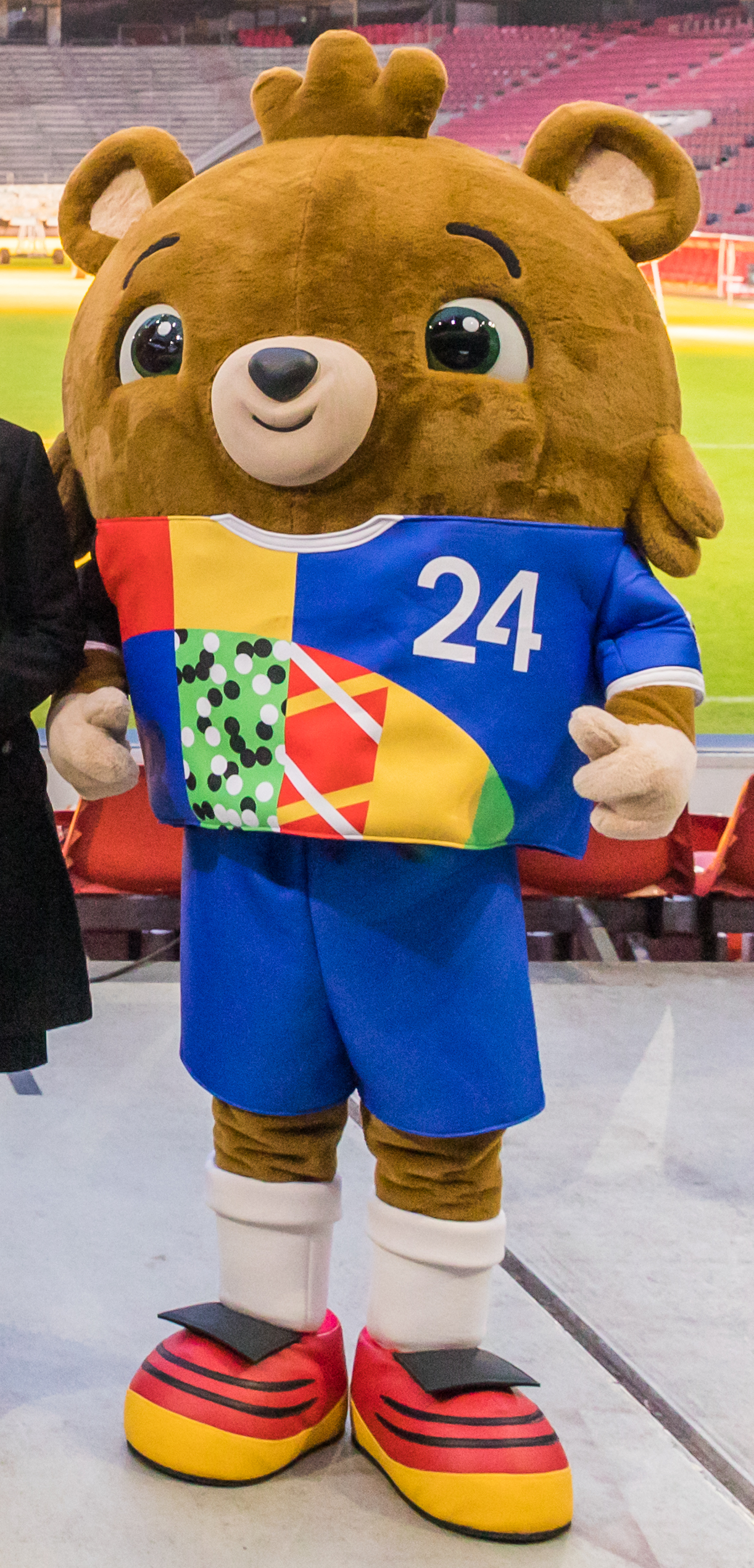
The official mascot "Albärt".

The official UEFA Euro 2024 mascot was unveiled on 20 June 2023 at the Germany vs Colombia international friendly in Gelsenkirchen. The mascot was a teddy bear with shorts on. A public vote was used to select the name of the mascot, with options being "Albärt", "Bärnardo", "Bärnheart" and "Herzi von Bär", all referencing the German word for bear (Bär). Results were made public on 5 July, with the mascot's name announced to be "Albärt", getting 32% of the votes.

Unofficially the event even has an animal oracle following in the footsteps of Paul the Octopus: Bubi the Elephant, who "predicted" Germany's opening round against Scotland with her initial kick through a makeshift goal.

=== Match ball ===
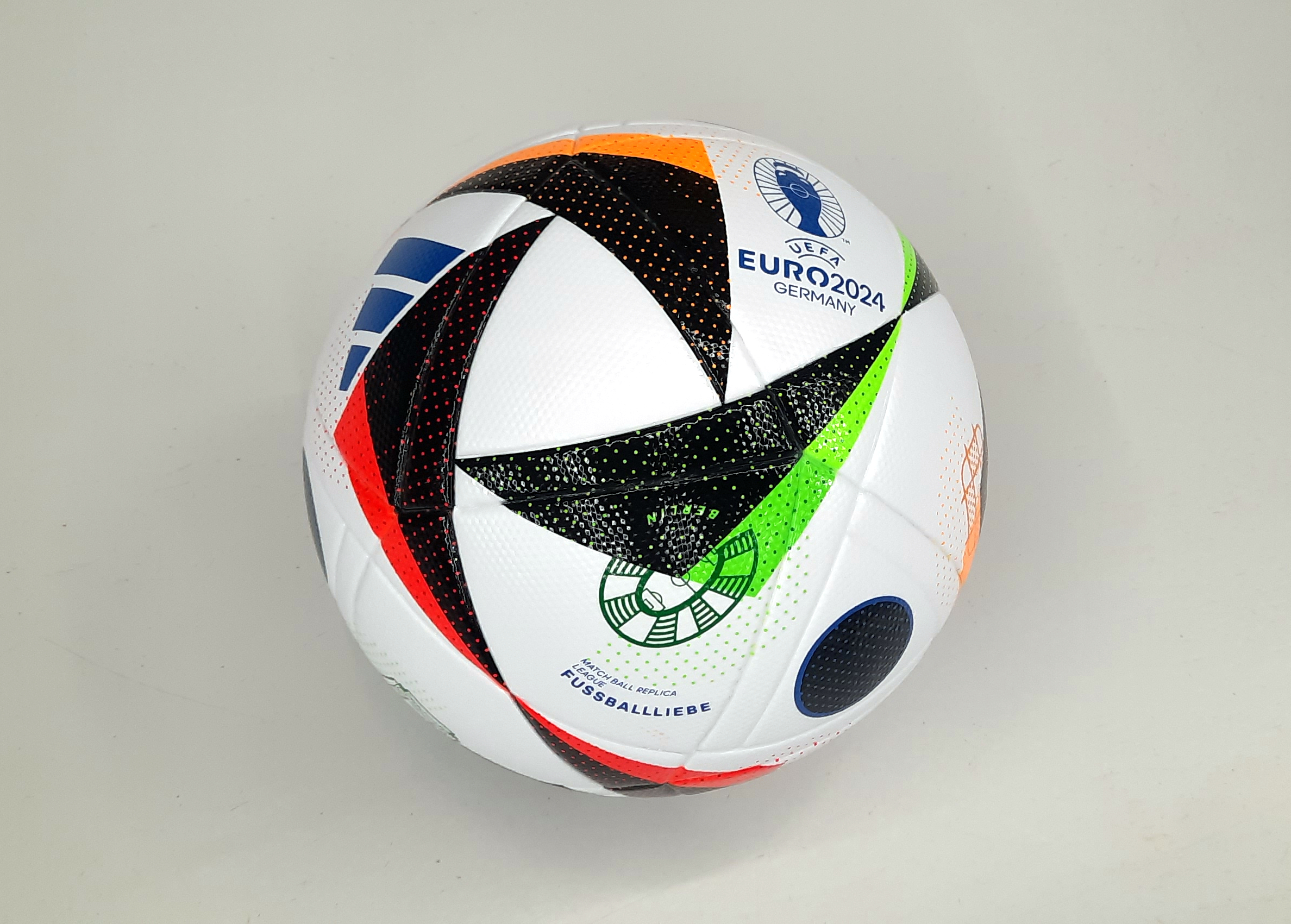
Official replica-version of the match ball "Fussballliebe".

The official match ball of the tournament, "Fussballliebe", was unveiled by UEFA and Adidas on 15 November 2023. Translated from the German as "football love", it featured black wing shapes with red, blue, orange and green edges and curves to showcase the qualified nations' vibrancy to the tournament, and the love that fans around the world give to football. Created with sustainable organic materials, this was the first ball for a UEFA Euro to feature "Connected Ball Technology", where it contained internal electronic sensors, allowing detection of its movement for UEFA match officials to use to assist in decision-making.

== Controversies and incidents ==
=== Pitch invasions, thrown projectiles, and other interference ===
The Group F match between Turkey and Portugal was interrupted four times by pitch invaders trying to take a selfie with Cristiano Ronaldo. Two others invaded the pitch right after the final whistle. Additional pitch invasions happened during the game between Albania and Italy, one during the game between Romania and Ukraine, and one during the round of 16 game between Romania and the Netherlands. During another pitch invasion after the semi-final between Spain and France, a security guard chasing the invader accidentally slid into Spanish striker Álvaro Morata, who suffered an injury as a consequence.

Several players and managers complained about fans throwing reusable plastic cups on the pitch, on occasion hitting players, particularly when taking a corner kick. Other objects were thrown as well, and Kevin De Bruyne had a laser pointer shone in his eye in one match.

=== Barnabás Varga injury ===
During the second half of the Group A fixture between Scotland and Hungary, Hungarian striker Barnabás Varga was left unconscious after a collision with Scottish goalkeeper Angus Gunn, landing in a fencing response. It was later revealed that Varga had suffered from a concussion and sustained multiple fractured cheekbones. Rapidly following the incident, medics made their way toward the scene and protective sheets were held around Varga. However, the stretcher bearers were seen walking toward the player, rather than running, prompting dismay from players, fans, and staff alike. Hungary captain Dominik Szoboszlai and fellow player Endre Botka proceeded to run with the stretcher in an attempt to speed up the process. Following the injury, the captain expressed his frustration, stating that the medical staff did not react quick enough, with hopes that "everyone can save a few seconds and save a life." This was rebutted by UEFA, who claimed that the coordination between the on-site medical staff was "professional", with "no delay in the treatment of and assistance to the player."

The match was resumed after 10 minutes, as Hungary went on to win by a score of 0–1 following a stoppage time goal from Kevin Csoboth, with Varga making a full recovery after undergoing surgery.

=== Balkan incidents ===
During the group stage, several controversies came up due to the behaviour of various Balkan fans and players. Albania and Serbia were both fined €10,000 after their fans displayed irredentist symbols; Serbian fans displayed maps of Kosovo as being a part of Serbia while Albanian fans displayed maps of Greater Albania. Serbia threatened to quit the tournament if UEFA did not take action against Croatia and Albania after some of their fans chanted anti-Serbian slogans during the match, such as Ubij ubij ubij Srbina ("Kill kill kill the Serb"); an investigation was later launched into Croatia. After the group stage game between Albania and Croatia, Mirlind Daku led the Albanian supporters in chanting anti-Macedonian and anti-Serbian slogans, and Albania was fined €47,250 and Daku was banned for two games. Kosovar journalist Arlind Sadiku was banned after making the crossed hands gesture towards Serbian fans during the Serbia and England game.

=== Merih Demiral celebration ===
In the Austria vs Turkey match on 2 July 2024, Turkish player Merih Demiral celebrated his second goal of the match with a wolf salute. The gesture is seen as ultra-nationalist due to its connection with far-right extremist group Grey Wolves and is banned in Austria, as well as France. The celebration was criticised by German interior minister Nancy Faeser, while Nationalist Movement Party president Devlet Bahçeli shared his support for the celebration. Demiral also posted a photo on his Twitter account of him performing the celebration along with the caption of: "How happy is the one who says I am a Turk!". UEFA opened an investigation on Demiral the following day before later handing him a two-match ban, meaning he would miss Turkey's quarter-final match against the Netherlands, as well as their first 2024–25 UEFA Nations League match as they were eliminated in the quarter-finals. Ahead of Turkey's following match against the Netherlands, Turkish supporters were seen making the controversial hand gesture en masse while on their way to the stadium as well as inside the stadium. UEFA's ban on Demiral was criticised by some Turkish media outlets as hypocritical and of double standard by drawing comparisons with the lighter penalty received by Jude Bellingham for offensive gesture made at the same tournament and with political gestures made by footballers of other nations which had gone unpunished in previous editions of the tournament.

=== Top Coffee bombing ===
On 14 July 2024, Al-Shabaab bombed Top Coffee in Mogadishu, Somalia, where spectators were watching the Euro 2024 final between England and Spain. The attack killed more than ten people and injured 20 others.

=== Spanish celebrations ===
Following Spain's victory in the final, videos showed some Spanish players (notably Álvaro Morata and Rodri) celebrating with offensive chants towards Gibraltar, a British Overseas Territory. The Gibraltar FA stated they would file a complaint with UEFA. UEFA eventually suspended both Morata and Rodri for Spain's upcoming match in the 2024–25 UEFA Nations League against Serbia.

=== Referee performance in the quarter-final Germany – Spain ===
The decisions of referee Anthony Taylor in the quarter-final between Germany and Spain were controversial. On the one hand, Toni Kroos could have received two yellow cards in the first minutes of the game, and on the other hand, a penalty for Germany could have been awarded in extra time after a handball by Spaniard Marc Cucurella in his own penalty area. In its internal review of the tournament, the UEFA Referees Committee came to the conclusion that a penalty should have been awarded.

== See also ==
- 2024 Copa América – 48th edition of the Copa América
- 2024 OFC Men's Nations Cup
- CONMEBOL–UEFA Cup of Champions – International football match
- UEFA Women's Euro 2025 – European football tournament
