= Methler =

- Stadtteil of Kamen
- Interactive map of Methler
- Location within Germany Location within North Rhine-Westphalia
- Coordinates: 51°34′N 7°36′E
- Country: Germany
- State: North Rhine-Westphalia
- Admin. region: Arnsberg
- District: Unna
- Town: Kamen
- Elevation: 55–71 m (180–233 ft)

Population (2013-12-31)
  - Total: 11,494
- Time zone: UTC+01:00 (CET)
  - Summer (DST): UTC+02:00 (CEST)
- Postal codes: 59174
- Dialling codes: 02307
- Vehicle registration: UN

Methler is a quarter of the city Kamen in the district Unna in North Rhine-Westphalia in Germany.

== Historic development ==
Methler is a part of Kamen since January 1, 1968. It was an independent commune until the first level of the communal rearrangement in 1967. After that, it was merged along with the communes Westick and Wasserkurl to the commune Methler.

Several archaeological finds in Westick indicate that there was Roman colonisation long before the name "Methler" was first established in 898 AD.

== Contemporary situation ==
Methler has about 12000 inhabitants, which makes it the largest quarter of Kamen (except from inner Kamen, which has about 22000 inhabitants). There is a small railway station with connections to the Ruhr Area (especially Dortmund) and the city of Hamm. Train stops to Dortmund are 2 times an hour. Methler has borders with Dortmund, Lünen and Unna, which makes it a well placed small town at the edge of the Ruhr Area.
