= Goal celebration =

Practice of celebrating the scoring of a goal

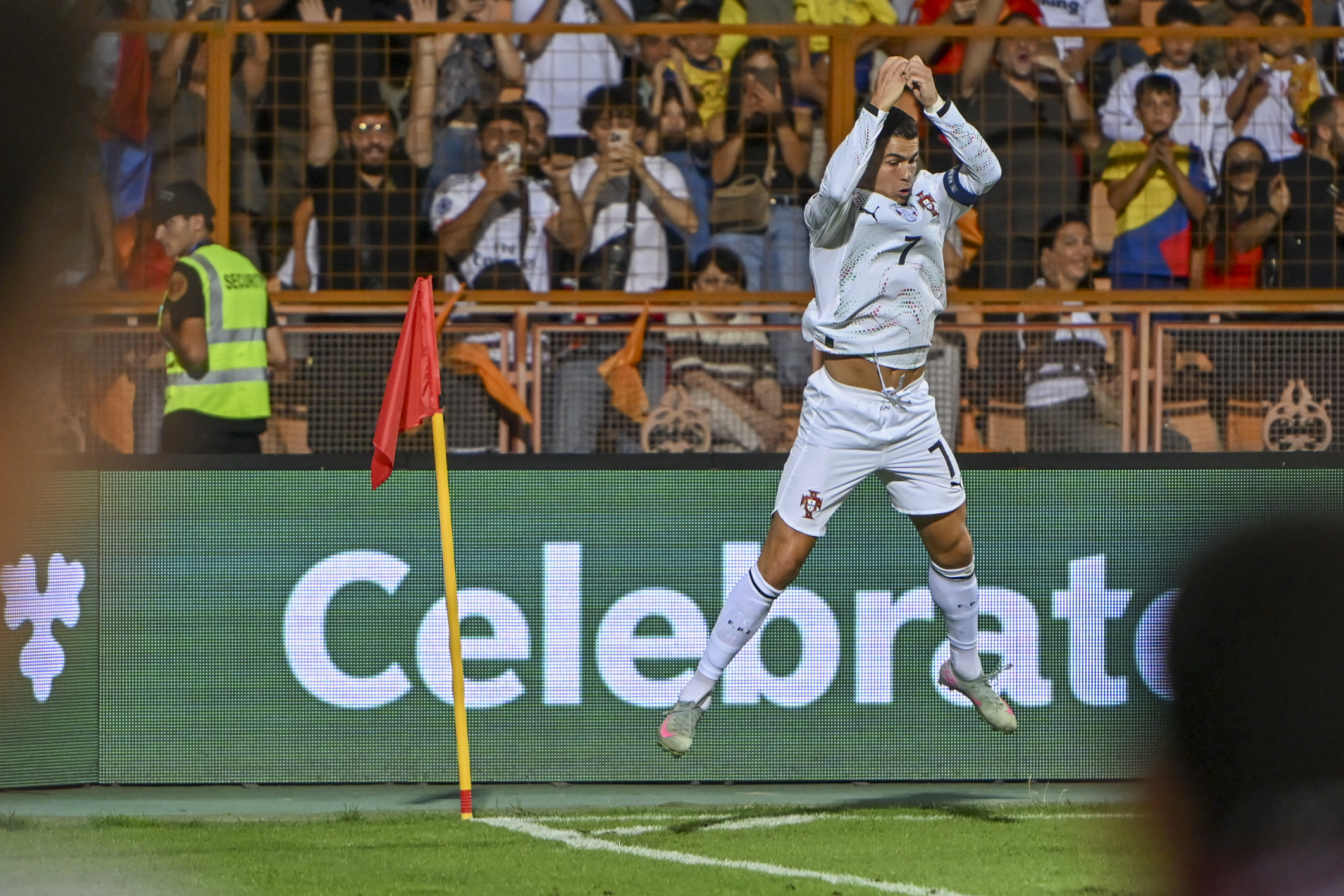
Cristiano Ronaldo performing his famous Siuuu celebration, often regarded as one of the most iconic and recognizable goal celebrations in sports.

In sports, a goal celebration is the practice of celebrating the scoring of a goal. The celebration is normally performed by the goalscorer, and may involve their teammates, the manager or coaching staff or the supporters of the team. Whilst referring to the celebration of a goal in general, the term can also be applied to specific actions, such as a player removing their shirt or performing a somersault. Celebrations are generally more substantial in lower-scoring sports, such as association football and ice hockey, where a score has greater significance.

Many goal celebrations have been immortalized, such as in a statue (Thierry Henry and Bobby Orr), advertisements (Ronaldo), postage stamps (Pelé), magazine covers, or in video games: Cristiano Ronaldo, Gareth Bale, and Lionel Messi among many others are featured in the FIFA and EA Sports FC series.

== Celebrations ==
=== Goal song ===
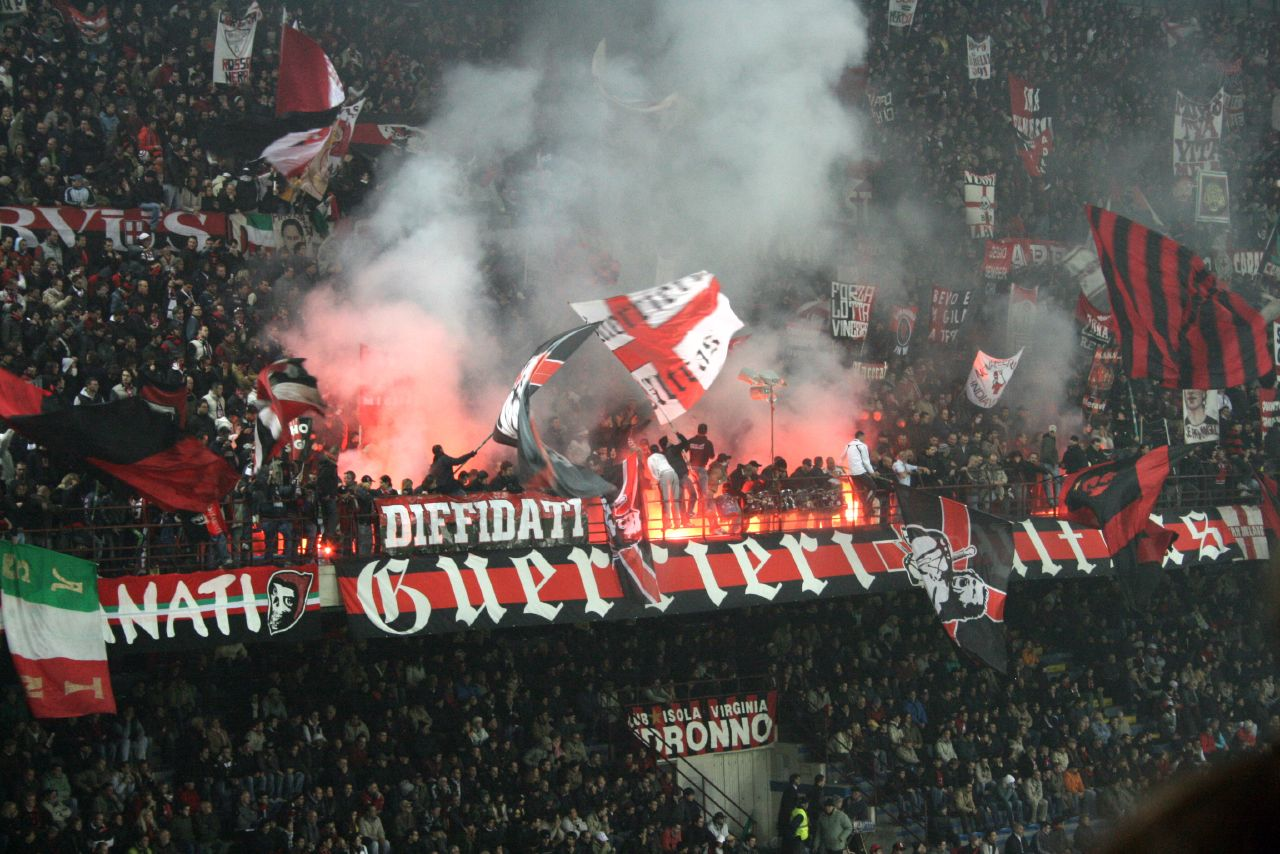
In addition to "Jump" being played, flares sometimes go off at A.C. Milan's San Siro when a goal is scored.

A goal song or goal celebration music is a short piece of music that is played in sports like football or ice hockey after a goal is scored. A goal horn sometimes sounds before the song is played, especially in the National Hockey League (NHL).

For example, Bellini's "Samba de Janeiro" was used as the goal song in UEFA Euro 2008. Van Halen's "Jump" is played every time A.C. Milan scores a goal at the San Siro. "Song 2" by Blur is played at some German and Austrian clubs. In North America, "Rock and Roll (Part Two)" by the Glitter Band is commonly played. Donbas Arena, the home ground of Ukrainian football club Shakhtar Donetsk, has a tradition of playing music each time home players score goals, with a track corresponding to the nationality of a scorer. For example, "Sabre Dance" by the Armenian Aram Khachaturian was played whenever his compatriot Henrikh Mkhitaryan scored. When FC Bayern Munich score a goal in the Allianz Arena, the Can-can plays.

In ice hockey, the use of goal songs is very common. Prior to 2012, a goal by the NHL's Montreal Canadiens, on home ice, was followed by U2's "Vertigo". The New York Rangers play the song "Slapshot", which was written by Ray Castoldi, the music director at Madison Square Garden. The Chicago Blackhawks and Nottingham Panthers play "Chelsea Dagger" by The Fratellis after every home goal.

=== Common celebrations ===
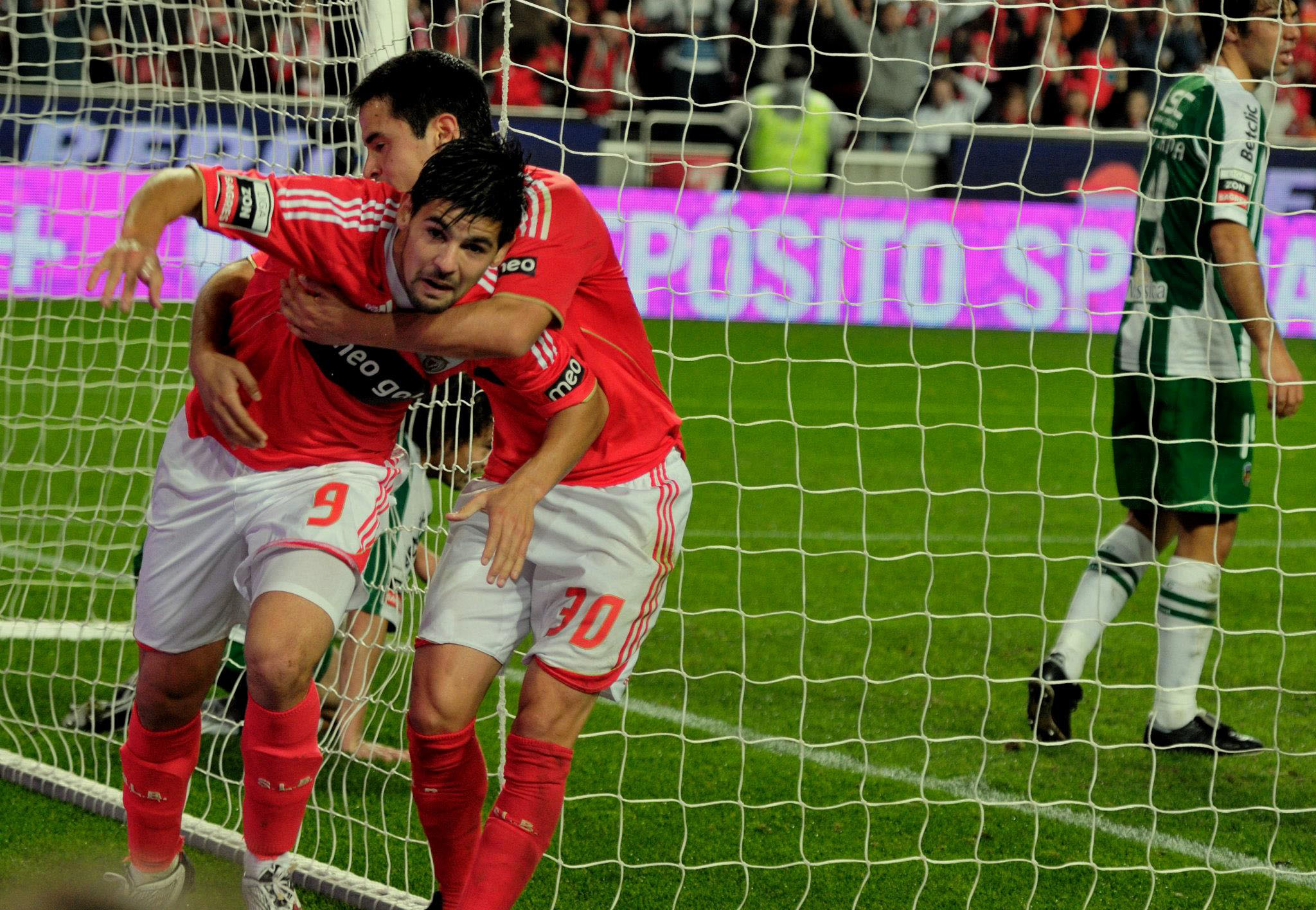
Nolito celebrates scoring a goal by running from teammates.

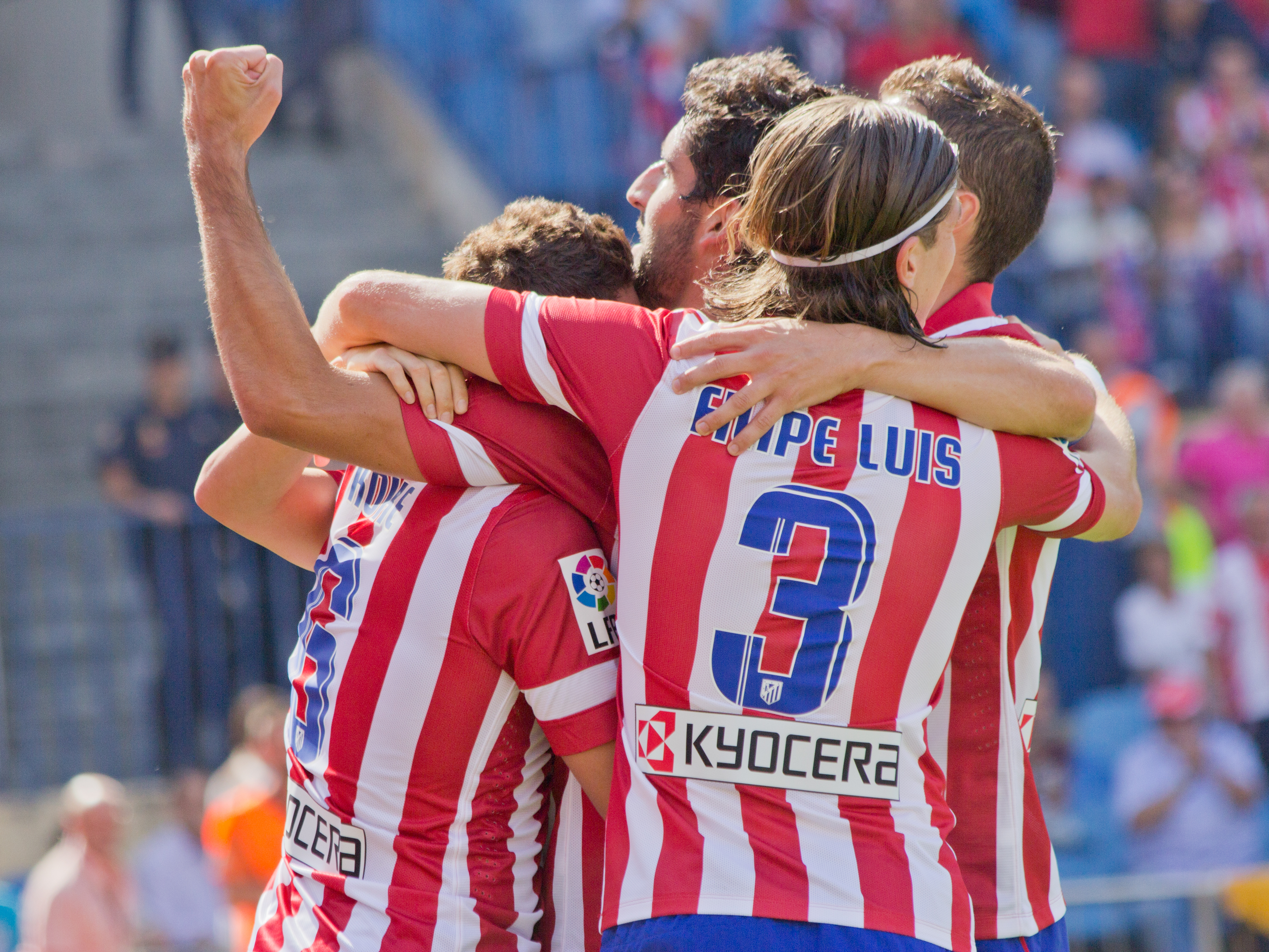
Atlético Madrid players celebrate a goal with a group hug.

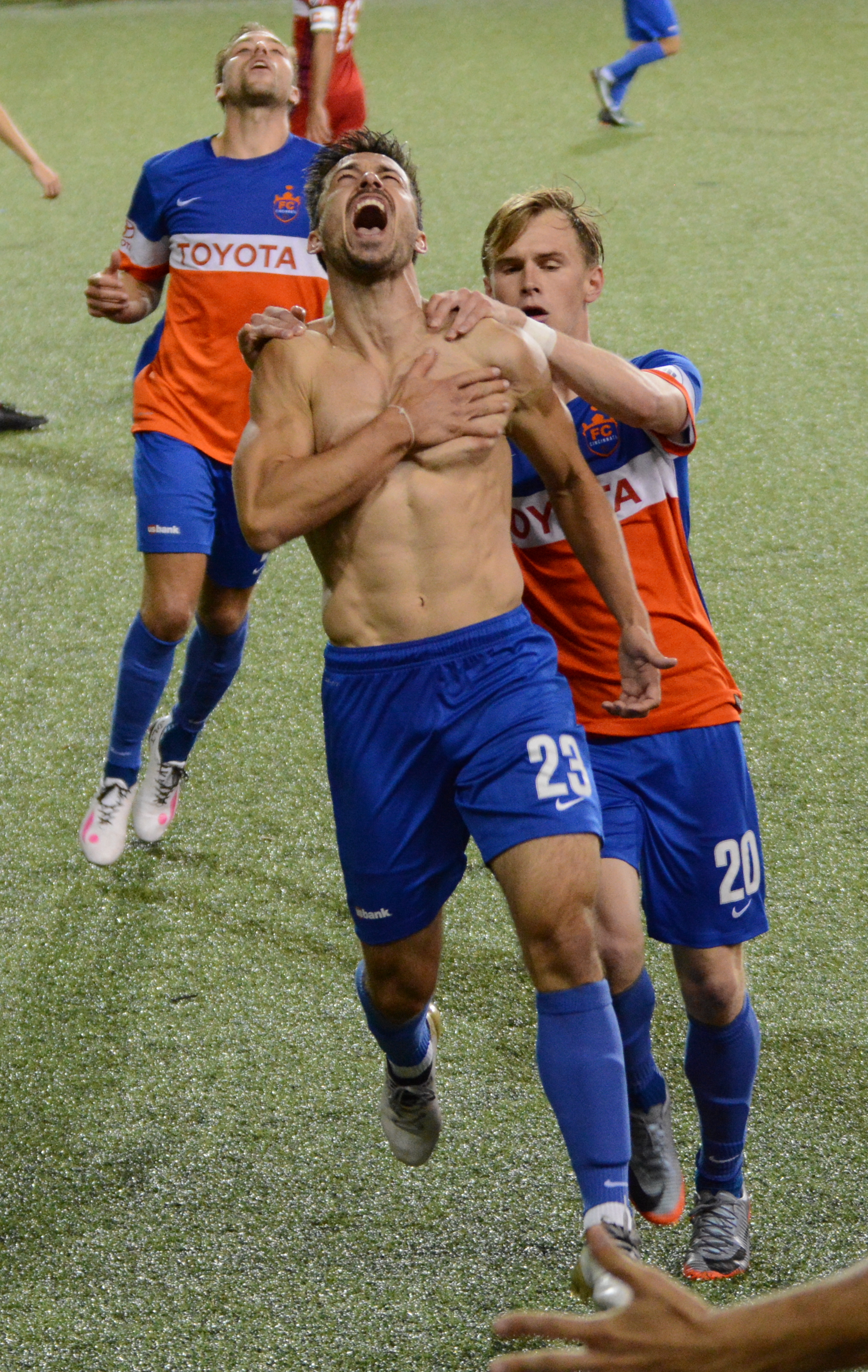
Andrew Wiedeman after ripping off his jersey

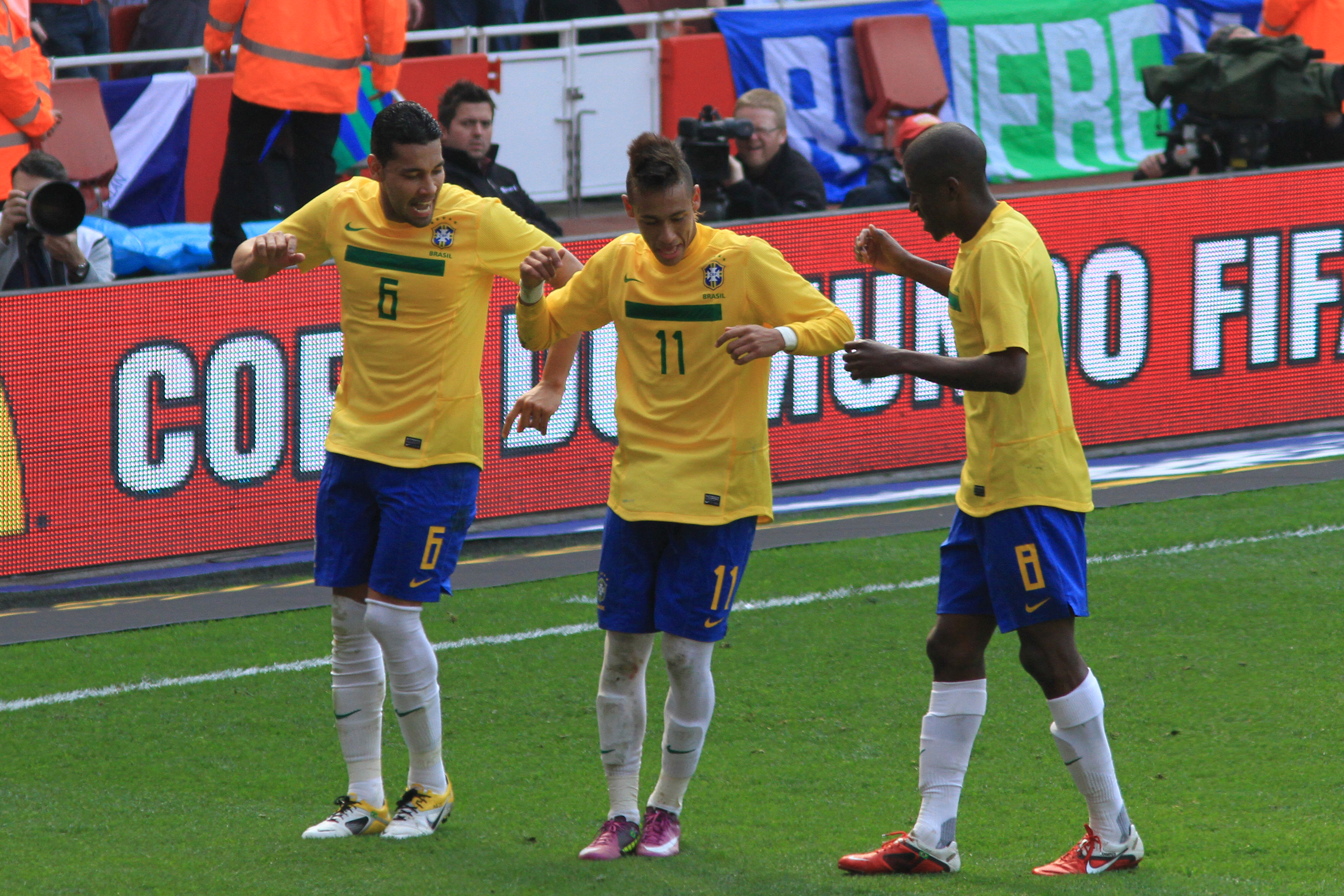
Neymar, Ramires and André Santos celebrating a goal with a dance

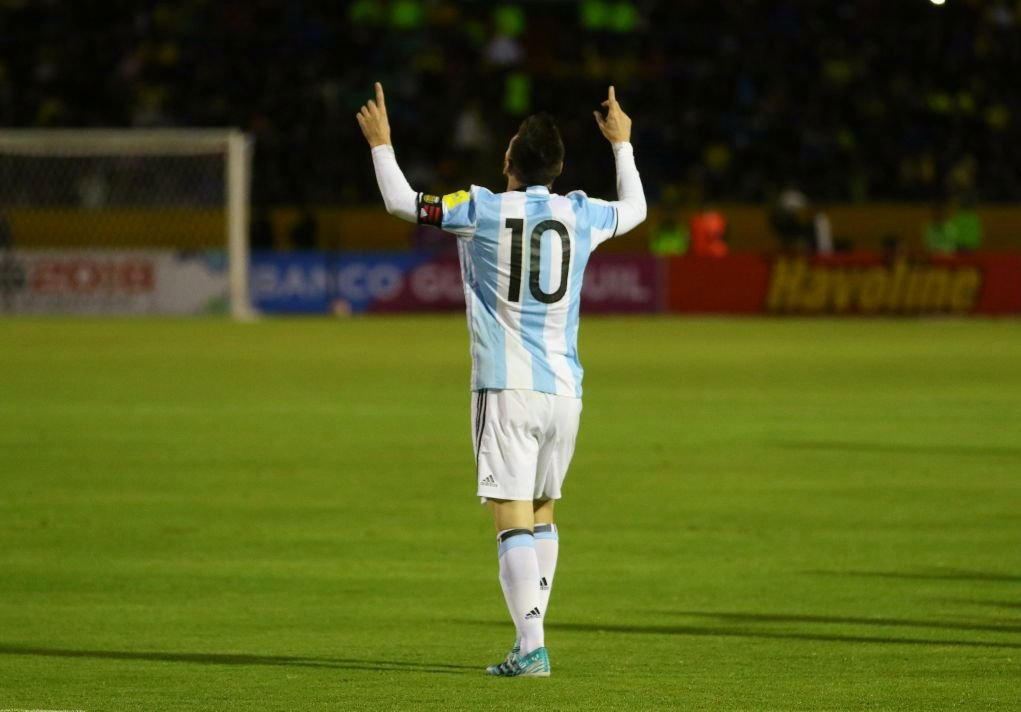
After blessing himself, Lionel Messi often celebrates a goal by pointing a finger on each hand towards the sky in dedication to his late grandmother. Players often point towards the skies to thank God, or recognise someone who has died.

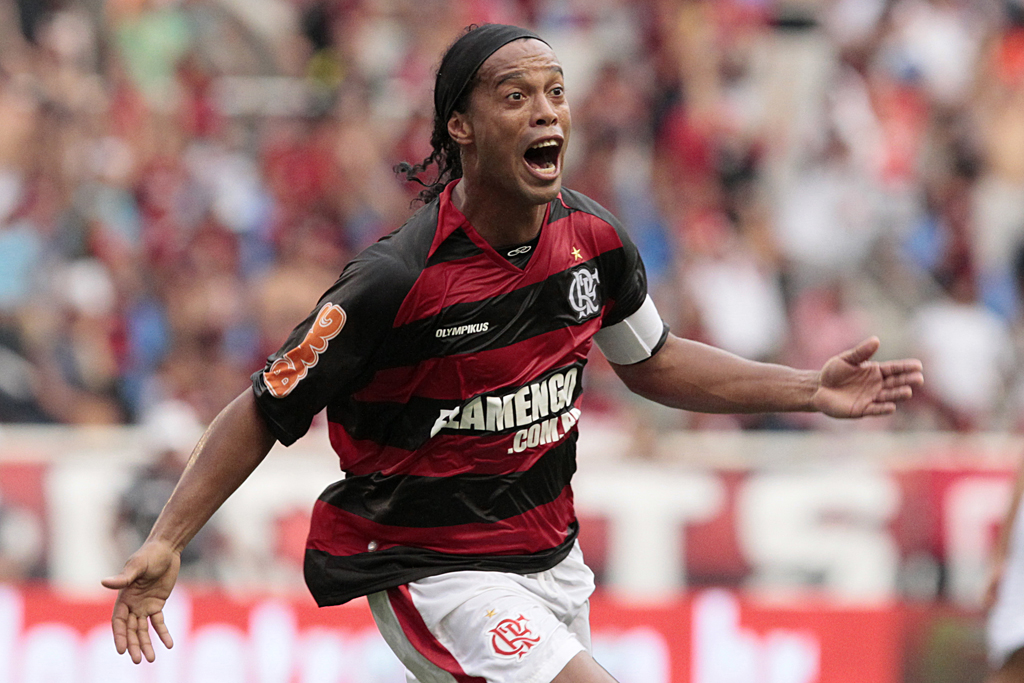
Ronaldinho celebrating scoring a goal with both arms waving

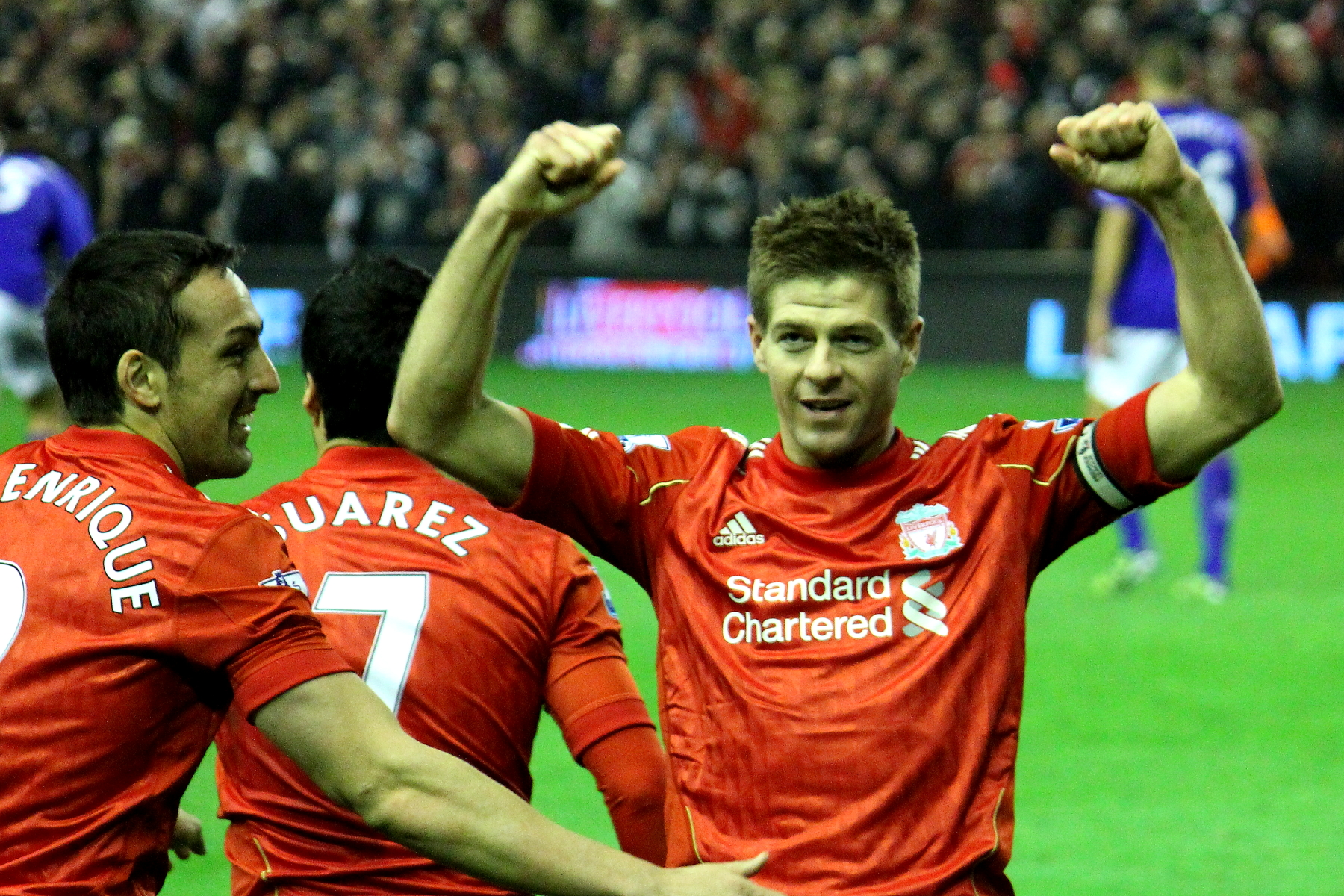
Steven Gerrard celebrating by connecting with fans. Players often point, salute or wave to their own fans, while some provoke opposition fans.

- A group hug of the players on the pitch, or the players jumping on each other's shoulders.
- The scorer running to corner fla standing with one of his hands holding the flagpole while screaming – Gabriel Batistuta's similar celebration when he played for Fiorentina inspired the design of his life-size bronze statue.
- The scorer putting an index finger to his lips, as if telling the opposition crowd and/or critics to be quiet – Real Madrid forward Raúl memorably celebrated in this manner when scoring against fierce rivals Barcelona at the Nou Camp in 1999. Starting with the 2002 FIFA World Cup, Ronaldo began celebrating goals by wagging his index finger at the crowd, as if telling his critics off.
- The scorer pretending to fire a machine gun, as done by Gabriel Batistuta and Edinson Cavani.
- The scorer turning his wrist near his ear, this is usually done while running. It was used many times, if not all, by Luca Toni.
- The scorer diving onto the grass with arms and legs outstretched. This was supposedly first done by Jürgen Klinsmann, shortly after he joined Tottenham Hotspur. Klinsmann was actually performing this goal celebration to satirise his own (in his belief unjustified) reputation for diving to win free-kicks and penalties. It became known as "a Klinsmann".
- The scorer walking or running away in a nonchalant style with a "cocky" smirk as if to say, "I'm the best, that was easy, etc."
- Ibrahimović making a heart sign with his hands for his goal celebrations. This has since been used by Gareth Bale, Ángel Di María & Lorenzo Insigne.
- The scorer kissing the ring finger. Married players are saluting to their spouses with this celebration. Rivaldo famously performed this celebration in the quarter-final match against Denmark in the 1998 FIFA World Cup. Luis Suárez has popularised a similar celebration, kissing his wrist and fingers as a tribute to his wife and kids.
- The scorer sliding on his knees – often done by Didier Drogba and Eden Hazard.
- The scorer stretching out both arms and running around changing the angle of arms mimicking an aeroplane. This was made famous by Brazilian striker Careca and later earned Italian forward Vincenzo Montella his nickname of "little aeroplane" (l'aeroplanino in Italian).
- The scorer outstretching both arms and running straight. Brazilian striker Ronaldo often celebrated in this manner in his early career – his goal celebration was the basis for Pirelli's 1998 commercial where he replaced the figure of Christ from the Christ the Redeemer statue while in an Inter Milan strip. Zlatan Ibrahimović, whose idol was Ronaldo, often celebrates with both arms outstretched.
- The scorer rocking his arms from side to side, as though rocking a baby. This usually signifies that the scorer's family recently welcomed a child. It was brought to the world's attention by Brazilian striker Bebeto (joined by teammates Romário and Mazinho) at the 1994 FIFA World Cup after his quarter-final goal against the Netherlands, celebrating his son Mattheus, born two days before.
- The scorer putting the ball underneath their shirt to indicate the pregnancy of a loved one.
- The scorer sucking his thumb as a tribute to his child(ren) or to signify that scoring a goal is like child's play. This became a trademark celebration of Roma legend Francesco Totti, giving him the nickname er Pupone (Roman dialect for "the big baby"). Bruno Fernandes often places his hands over his ears after sucking his thumb.
- The scorer pointing towards the skies, either to express gratitude to God or to reference a person who is deceased – Kaká invariably gave thanks. Lionel Messi also celebrates goals in a similar manner, dedicating them to his late grandmother.
- The scorer taking a camera. Son Heung-min often does camera celebrations after scoring.
- The scorer putting his hands behind his ears as if to listen to the reaction of the crowd more. This is usually done when a player is getting booed during the game and then scores, or if a player returns to score against his former club. Manchester United striker Romelu Lukaku did this after scoring away against Everton, whose supporters had booed him throughout the match. Rarely, this celebration is aimed at club staff, players or officials for various internal reasons.
- The scorer doing a dance, often joined by teammates. Roger Milla's corner flag dances at the 1990 FIFA World Cup made the Cameroonian famous. Peter Crouch garnered attention for his robot dances after scoring goals for England. Five South Africa players performed a memorable Macarena-style dance after scoring the opening goal at the 2010 World Cup. Antoine Griezmann's 'Hotline Bling' goal celebration dance features in a 2016 Puma commercial.
- The scorer performing some kind of acrobatic routine after the goal. Mexico striker Hugo Sánchez was the first notable exponent of the backflip. In the women's game, Sam Kerr of the Australian Women's National Team is also known for celebrating a goal with a backflip. Nigerian footballers are also well known for performing backflips after they score a goal, this notably includes Obafemi Martins and a very famous one performed by Julius Aghahowa at the 2002 FIFA World Cup after he scored a goal against Sweden. Lomana LuaLua was banned from performing backflips by his then-club Portsmouth after injuring one of his feet during a celebration. Miroslav Klose and Pierre-Emerick Aubameyang are also noted for celebrating in this manner, albeit with front flips.
- The scorer removing his shirt. Rivaldo would most often do this in Brazil matches, holding his shirt in his right hand and spinning it over his head. Since 2004, this is considered Excessive Celebration per FIFA's Laws of the Game, and results in a yellow card. During the 2022 World Cup, Cameroon's Vincent Aboubakar took off his shirt to celebrate a winning goal against Brazil, but received a second yellow card and was sent off. Sometimes, players wear an undershirt with a message on it, and take off their shirt to reveal the message. After scoring in the 2010 World Cup Final, Spanish midfielder Andrés Iniesta took off his shirt, revealing a message paying tribute to Dani Jarque, who had died just under a year earlier.
- The scorer lifting up his shirt to reveal a message written on an undershirt. Romário was a frequent adopter of this kind of celebration, showing up with a different message every match. Roma striker Francesco Totti often celebrated goals against Lazio in the Rome derby in this way, once memorably revealing a t-shirt which sported the Italian equivalent of the phrase "I have done you again!". Italian striker Mario Balotelli famously lifted his shirt to reveal the words "Why Always Me?".
- The scorer imitating to shoot with some kind of weapon, either aiming towards the sky or to some other virtual target. Republic of Ireland striker Robbie Keane once performed a forward roll and finished by mimicking an archer against Saudi Arabia. Egyptian/ Liverpool forward Mohammed Salah, often celebrates by imitating the draw of a bow, before releasing, as well as former PSG striker Edinson Cavani.
- Teammates congratulating the scorer by kneeling down and pretending to shine his shoe – Ronaldo's Inter Milan teammates often congratulated him in this manner.
- Lying in the prostrate position to thank God in sujud, mostly done by Muslim players – Egyptian forward Mohamed Salah performs this after a goal same as Santiago Gimenez.
- The scorer saluting the crowd – alternatively the scorer mocking the crowd, as Cristiano Ronaldo did twice after scoring against Barcelona at the Nou Camp, in 2012 and 2016, when he gestured to the crowd to "calm down" after he scored.
- The scorer jumping and punching the air – this celebration features in Pelé's 1969 Brazilian postage stamp that commemorates his 1,000th career goal. Swedish forward Tomas Brolin often celebrated with a jump-pirouette.
- The scorer pulling his shirt over his face – often done by Fabrizio Ravanelli.
- The scorer jumping into the crowd. This is commonly done whenever a very significant goal, such as an injury-time winner, is scored, an example being Troy Deeney's last-minute goal for Watford against Leicester City in 2013, sending Watford to a Wembley Play-Off Final.
- The scorer running the length of the field. Infamously done by then-Manchester City striker Emmanuel Adebayor against his former club Arsenal in 2009.
- Some players who have tattoos on their wrists or forearms will often kiss them to show respect to whoever or whatever the tattoo symbolises. Spanish striker Álvaro Negredo is an example, as is the Uruguayan Luis Suárez.
- "The Thierry Henry" or "Henrying" was made famous by striker Thierry Henry, who would celebrate by simply propping himself up against the goal post while another hand was on the hip, hinting that he's tired and/or tired of scoring goals, and has a "been there, done that"-type of reaction. This went viral in social networks, using the pose to photoshop Henry into appropriate settings, from propping up the Leaning Tower of Pisa, to helping Muhammad Ali with his punching bag.
- The scorer hitting or kicking the corner flag. Dutch striker Klaas-Jan Huntelaar kicked the corner flag after scoring the winning penalty against Mexico in the round of 16 at the 2014 FIFA World Cup. Australian midfielder Tim Cahill was famous for his regular celebration of shadow boxing around the corner flag. West Ham United forward Paolo Di Canio once snapped a corner flag in half after kicking it in celebration of a goal against Leicester City, which was thought at the time to have been the Italian's final goal for the club before a strongly-rumoured transfer to Manchester United; the move never materialised.
- The scorer reacting with their mouth as wide open as possible – the magnitude of Zinedine Zidane's left foot volleyed winner in the 2002 UEFA Champions League Final saw him produce one of his most emotional goal celebrations as he ran towards the touchline with mouth wide open, screaming in delight. Liberian star George Weah had a similar open mouthed expression having run almost the entire length of the field and scored for Milan in 1996.
- The scorer blowing a kiss to the crowd (this can be done in a mocking gesture); alternatively, the scorer provoking the crowd by kissing his team badge, or in the case of Barcelona captain Carles Puyol in 2009, kissing his Catalan armband in front of Real Madrid fans.
- The scorer pointing/waving to their own fans – alternatively, wave in a provocative manner to opposition fans; after scoring against Manchester United at Old Trafford in 2009 Liverpool striker Fernando Torres held his hand in the air to fans of arch rivals United, with his 'five times' gesture (spread out five fingers) signifying Liverpool's five Champions League titles (to United's three).
- The scorer swinging an arm – Mick Channon celebrated with his trademark windmill (swinging one arm round and round); South Korea's Park Ji-sung performed a two armed windmill after scoring against Greece at the 2010 World Cup. The two-armed windmill was also a trademark celebration for Marcelinho Carioca.
- The scorer kissing the club/national badge on their shirt, to show their love and loyalty for the club/country; some players have even revelled in kissing the badge of their new team when scoring against their former club, a notable example being Wayne Rooney kissing the Manchester United badge when scoring against his boyhood team Everton.
- The scorer jumping and spinning simultaneously with both arms pointing upwards and landing with a firm stance with both arms pointing down. Commonly known as the "Siuuu", this gesture was first done by Real Madrid forward Cristiano Ronaldo and means "yes" in Spanish.
- The scorer puts on a mask after scoring. Many different masks were used in the past, some of the most notable ones are Quincy Promes, who wore a red mask, Pierre-Emerick Aubameyang who used a Black Panther mask and Dominic Solanke who used Obito's mask.

== Punishment ==
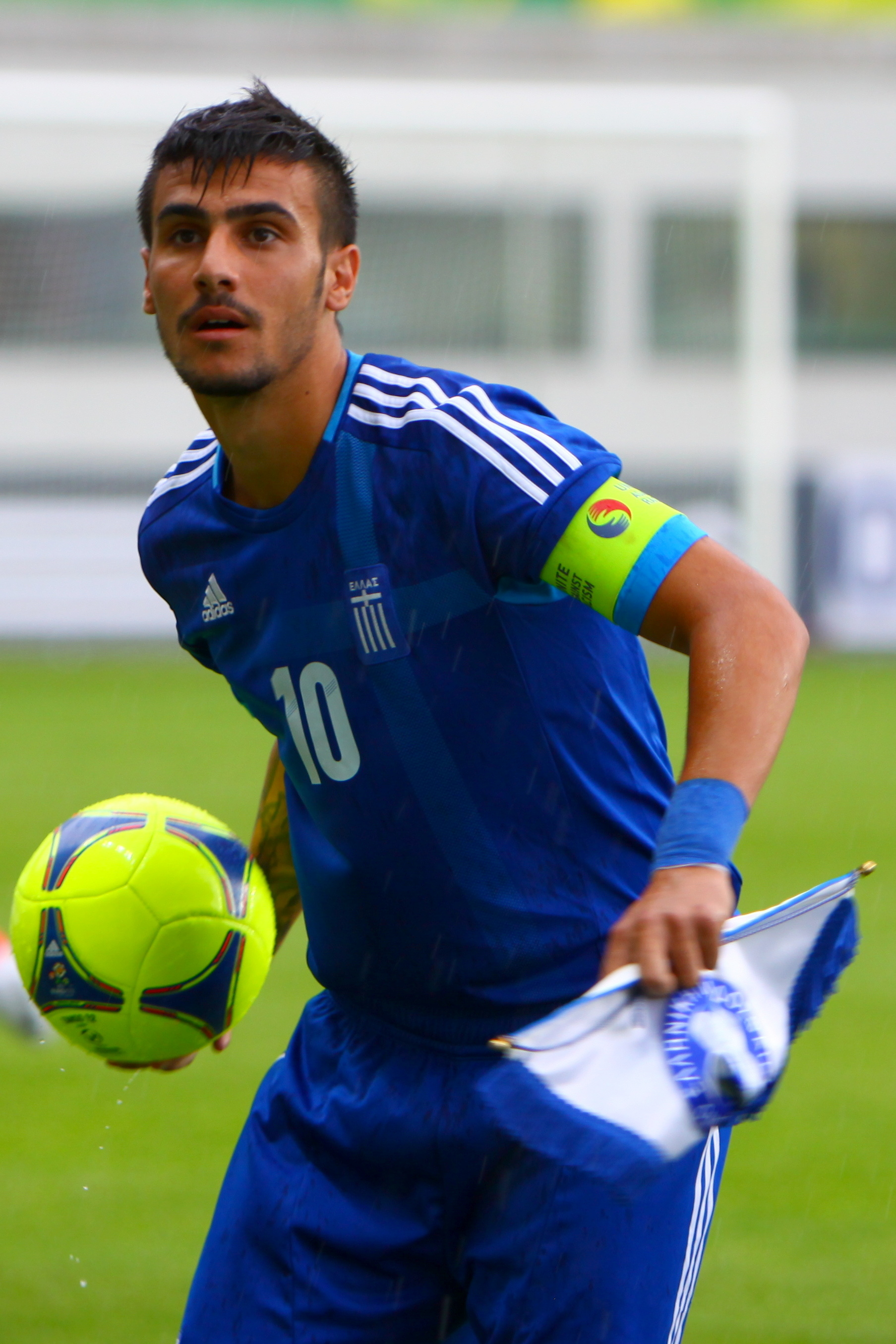
Georgios Katidis was fined €50,000 and banned for life from representing Greece after he celebrated scoring a goal with a Nazi salute.

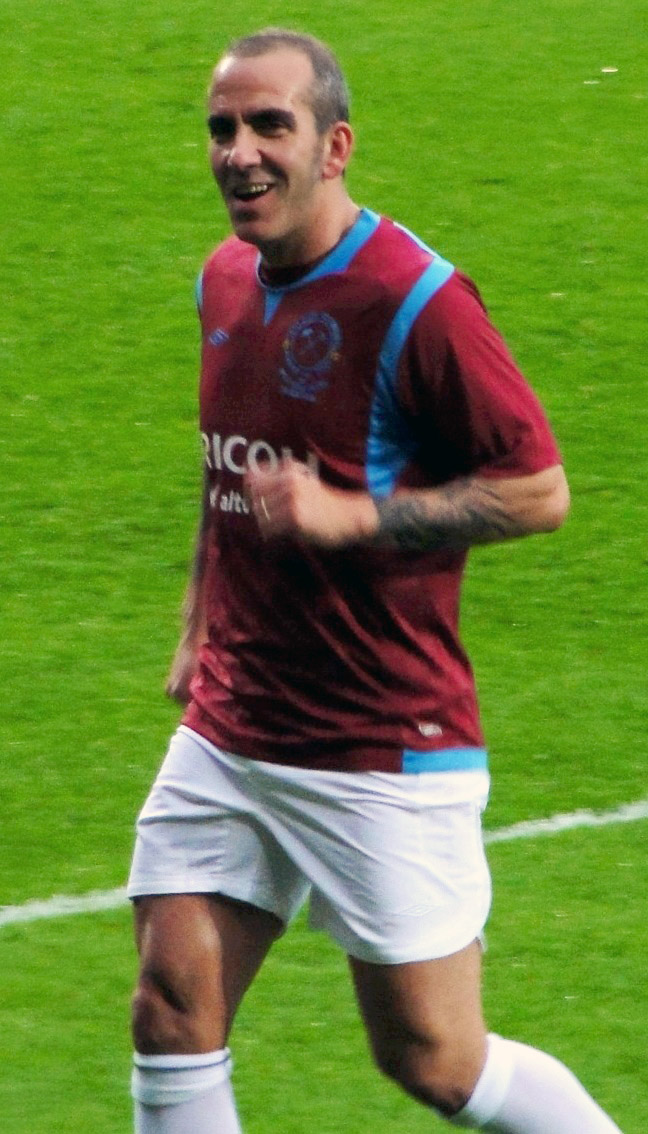
Paolo Di Canio was suspended and fined after celebrating a goal with a fascist salute while playing for S.S. Lazio.

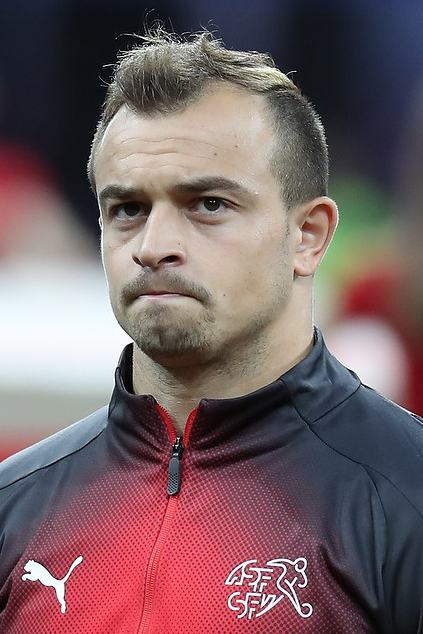
Xherdan Shaqiri celebrated his goal at the 2018 World Cup by making an eagle gesture, a symbol of ethnic Albanians, towards Serbian fans.

According to the rules of the games (Law 12):

While it is permissible for a player to demonstrate his joy when a goal has been scored, the celebration must not be excessive.

In recent seasons, FIFA have attempted to crack down on some of the more enthusiastic celebrations. If a player incites the crowd, jumping into the stands, and/or takes their shirt off or puts the ball under their shirt to indicate a pregnancy after scoring a goal, they are likely to get booked by the referee. This can cause huge controversy if the player has already been booked, since they would then be sent off. However, some players get around this rule by pulling the hem of their shirts over the head, without taking the shirt off entirely, but this is not always overturned by the referees. Some players have received fines for dropping their shorts after scoring.

Jumping into the crowd is also a bookable offence on the category of ("Deliberately leaving the field of play without the referee's permission", as identified in Law 12).

Players might be also fined for revealing T-shirts which contain some kind of message directed to the spectators. Notable examples include Robbie Fowler being fined for showing a T-shirt that was designed to show support for the Liverpool dockers' strike, incorporating the Calvin Klein "CK" into the word doCKer; and Thierry Henry, who was fined by UEFA after he removed his Arsenal shirt to reveal a T-shirt reading "For the new-born Kyd", which was directed to his friend, Texas lead singer Sharleen Spiteri, who had just given birth. In 1999, Robbie Fowler was also fined £60,000 by his club and the Premier League for having celebrated his penalty goal against Everton by getting down on all fours and miming the snorting of cocaine off of the white touchline. Although it was seen as Fowler's response to being accused of drug abuse in the tabloid press, then-manager Gérard Houllier famously claimed that he was merely imitating "a cow eating grass".

In January 1998, Rangers midfielder Paul Gascoigne courted serious controversy during a goal celebration where he mimed playing a flute (symbolic of the flute-playing of Loyalist Orange Order marchers) during a game against Celtic at Celtic Park. The gesture infuriated Celtic fans who had been taunting him and Gascoigne was fined £20,000 by Rangers after the incident. He also received a death threat from an Irish Republican Army (IRA) member following the incident.

Boca Juniors striker Carlos Tevez was sent off for imitating a chicken when celebrating a goal against arch-rivals River Plate during the 2004 Copa Libertadores, clearly mocking the opposition crowd, with River called 'Gallinas' ('chickens') by other fans for choking late on.

Paolo Di Canio made his mark in 2005, when during his period at Lazio, he made a fascist salute to the right-wing fans. He was fined and suspended as a result.

Ipswich Town player David Norris received a fine after using a handcuff gesture to celebrate scoring against Blackpool in November 2008, dedicating the goal to ex-teammate Luke McCormick, who was jailed for death by dangerous driving. Everton midfielder Tim Cahill received a similar fine for a similar gesture in a match on 2 March 2008. A similar incident took place in Chelsea against Middlesbrough, when Chelsea's Salomon Kalou scored a brace and thereafter crossed hands with Ivorian teammate Didier Drogba. It was later revealed, however, that he claimed to have wanted to try out a new celebration and was not supporting an Ivorian convictionist.

In a 2009 Premier League match between Manchester City and Arsenal, Manchester City striker Emmanuel Adebayor received a yellow card for running the length of the pitch to celebrate his goal in front of the Arsenal fans. This was seen as controversial because Adebayor signed for Manchester City that summer from Arsenal.

In March 2013, AEK Athens midfielder Giorgos Katidis made a Nazi salute towards the crowd after scoring the winning goal against Veria. Though he later said he did not realise the meaning of the gesture, Katidis was fined €50,000, banned from playing for AEK for the remainder of the season, and given a lifetime ban from representing Greece at the international level.

West Bromwich Albion striker Nicolas Anelka was banned for five games and fined for celebrating a goal scored in December 2013 with a quenelle. While there was controversy with the gesture being linked to anti-Semitism, Anelka was cleared of being anti-Semitic or endorsing anti-Semitism.

At the 2018 World Cup in Russia, Xherdan Shaqiri and fellow Swiss goalscorer Granit Xhaka, who is also of Kosovar descent, celebrated their goals by making an eagle gesture, a symbol of ethnic Albanians, towards Serbian fans. FIFA fined Xhaka and Shaqiri 10,000 Swiss francs "for unsporting behaviour contrary to the principles of fair-play".

At the 2023 AFC Asian Cup in Qatar, in the round of 16 match, Iraq national team player Aymen Hussein was sent off with a second yellow card in the 77th minute after celebrating the second goal against the Jordan national team, where he celebrated as if he was eating from a plate (referring to Mansaf, the most famous dish in Jordan) in front of the Jordan national team fans. In a later statement, the Asian Football Confederation confirmed that the referee's decision was correct and considered the celebration excessive.

== Not celebrating a goal ==
Refusing to celebrate a goal or undertaking muted goal celebrations is not unknown and not uncommon in football. In the case of the former, it is often seen when a player scores against a former club, especially one where the player began his career and/or had his greatest period of success, or where he first made his name. Non-celebration against former clubs does seem to be a fairly recent trend, however. There are several recorded examples of players celebrating against their old club prior to the 2000s, when this practice started to become regarded as disrespectful. A famous early example was Denis Law's sincere dismay at scoring the goal in 1974 that of the possibility that it may have caused the relegation of his previous club, Manchester United.

Muted celebration usually occurs when scoring a consolation goal in a match that is otherwise already lost; celebration may be omitted entirely if there is not enough time left on the clock and the losing team wants the match to continue as soon as possible. It also occurs when a large number of goals have been scored by one team in a match, and the result has been put beyond doubt; for later goals, celebrations might be reduced or non-existent.

=== Michael Olise ===
Michael Olise is known for his muted or non-celebration of goals with one of the first examples being is his late equalizing goal against Manchester United as a Crystal Palace player in 2023. It attracted fan and media attention in the Premier League at the time. His subdued celebrations trace back to his boyhood where, after a goal, "he would put his finger to his mouth and run back to his position, looking at the ground". Since becoming professional, his most used goal celebration involves "plugging an ear with one hand and making a 'shhh' gesture with the other." Rather than being a stunt or an expression of arrogance, Olise's former teammates and coaches explained that this merely comes from Olise not wanting to draw attention to himself; he simply sees scoring goals as part of his job. Olise himself explained: "I am not a super emotional person. I don’t react the same way everyone else reacts." His trademark goal celebration has been recreated by tennis player Ben Shelton, American football players Jaxon Smith-Njigba and Christian Gonzalez, and basketball player Karl-Anthony Towns, among others.

== Injuries ==
While unusual, a number of football players have injured themselves during celebration: examples include Paulo Diogo (who severed a finger after it got caught in a fence), Thierry Henry, Zlatan Ibrahimović, Fabián Espíndola, (who celebrated a goal that was later disallowed due to offside) and Michy Batshuayi. An Indian footballer, Peter Biaksangzuala, died from a spine injury in 2014 following a failed somersault celebration.

Nicolai Muller once injured himself while celebrating scoring a goal against FC Augsburg when he spun around repeatedly in a "helicopter" style which had until that point been his trademark celebration. Medical examination confirmed that the striker had ruptured the ACL in his right knee. He was out of action for 10 months, and after his team was relegated, he left the club.

== Managers and coaches celebrations ==
Managers (and coaching staff) have been known for their exuberant goal celebrations. Some notable celebrations include:

- On 10 April 1993, Alex Ferguson's Manchester United were losing to Sheffield Wednesday in the Premier League with four minutes of the 90 to go before Steve Bruce equalised. After 7 minutes of injury time – dubbed 'Fergie Time', alluding to extra minutes allegedly being granted to Ferguson's teams to get a goal – Bruce scored the 97th-minute winner, with Ferguson running from his dugout on to the touch line, while assistant Brian Kidd ran and leapt on to the field.
- In the 2004 Champions League last 16 game between Manchester United and Porto, José Mourinho's Porto were on the verge of a defeat when Costinha scored a goal with 30 seconds left of the official 90 minutes to win the tie. Mourinho jumped up from his dugout, fists punching the air as he sprinted down the sideline near to his celebrating players – this dramatic celebration is regarded as the moment when Mourinho announced himself to the game.
- In the 2009 Champions League semi-final, Pep Guardiola's Barcelona were losing to Chelsea with minutes remaining before Andrés Iniesta fired in from 20 yards to win the tie on away goals. An ecstatic Guardiola uncharacteristically sprinted down the touch line near to where his players were celebrating.
- At the closing stages of a 2018 Premier League game between Chelsea and Manchester United, United and former Chelsea manager José Mourinho was involved in a tunnel incident. With Chelsea's Ross Barkley scoring a 96th-minute equaliser, Chelsea's coach, Marco Ianni, celebrated by running in front of the Manchester United bench and clenching his fists close to Mourinho's face. An incensed Mourinho leapt up and attempted to chase Ianni down the tunnel, with security intervening. As he sat back down Chelsea fans repeatedly (and loudly) chanted "fuck off Mourinho". At full-time, Mourinho walked over to United fans and applauded, and on his way back to the tunnel he held up three fingers towards Chelsea fans, reminding them he won three Premier League titles with the club.
- During a Merseyside derby in the 2018–19 Premier League, Liverpool manager Jürgen Klopp caused controversy for his celebrations near the end of the match. As Divock Origi scored a 96-minute winner against Everton, Klopp ran onto the pitch to hug goalkeeper Alisson. Klopp later apologized for his actions, but was nonetheless fined £8,000 by The Football Association.
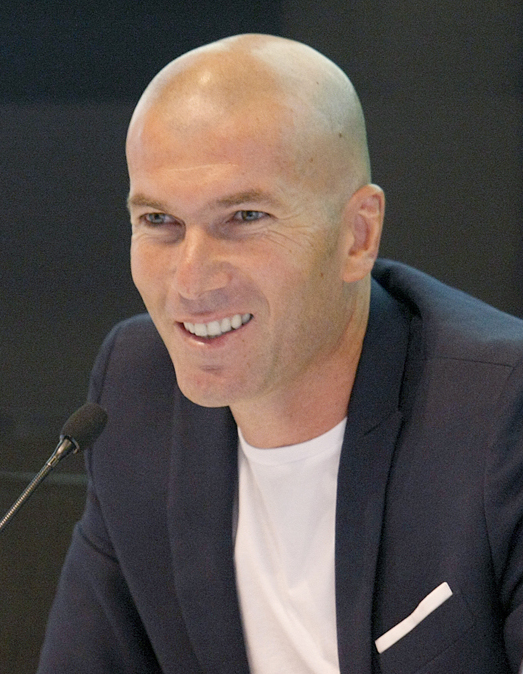
- In 2026, Zidane's celebration of Michael Olise's game-winning goal has gone viral
  In September 2026, Zinedine Zidane, on his second game as France national football team manager, celebrated Michael Olise's 88th minute solo winning goal by running on the touchline and kicking a ball off a cone. He explained that he initially "didn't know what he did" but "sensed he [Olise] was off on a dribble and he made an exceptional play, so I wanted to follow him. And then I saw the ball there and I told myself I had to shoot it. It might be a little bit ridiculous, but it doesn't matter." It has since gone viral.

== See also ==
- Football culture
- Gatorade shower
- Pitch invasion
- Touchdown celebration
- Try celebration
