= Goal (ice hockey) =

Point scoring in ice hockey

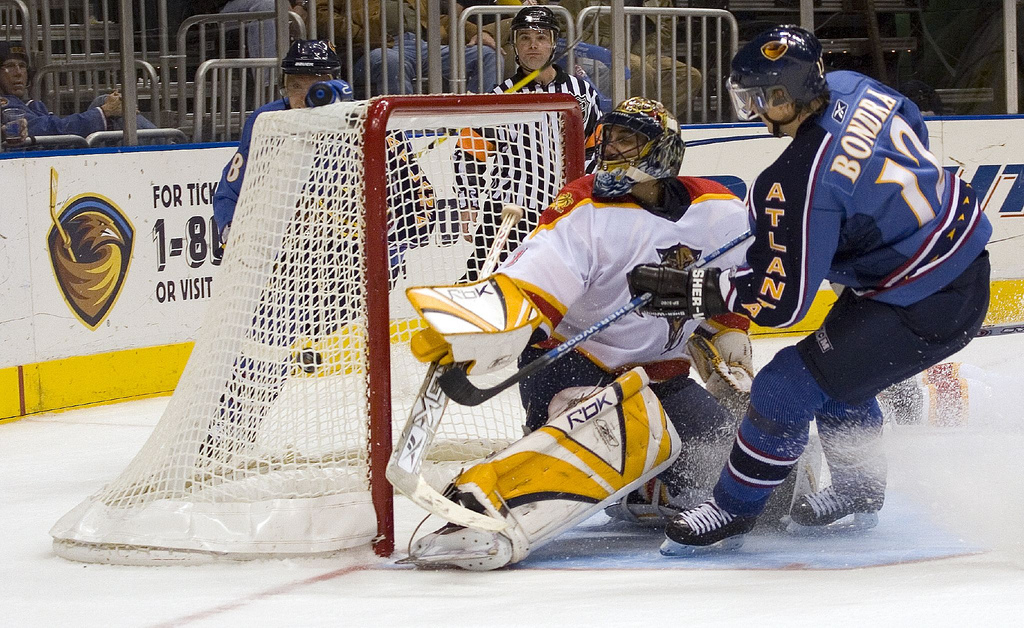
Peter Bondra, of the Atlanta Thrashers scoring a goal versus Roberto Luongo of the Florida Panthers.

In ice hockey, a goal is scored when the puck entirely crosses the goal line between the two goal posts and below the goal crossbar. A goal awards one point to the team attacking the goal scored upon, regardless of which team the player who actually deflected the puck into the goal belongs to (see also own goal). Typically, a player on the team attempting to score shoots the puck with their stick towards the goal net opening, and a player on the opposing team called a goaltender tries to block the shot to prevent a goal from being scored against their team.

The term goal may also refer to the structure in which goals are scored. The ice hockey goal is rectangular in shape; the front frame of the goal is made of steel tube painted red and consists of two vertical goalposts and a horizontal crossbar. A net is attached to the back of the frame to catch pucks that enter the goal and also to prevent pucks from entering it from behind. The entire goal is considered an inbounds area of the playing surface, and it is legal to play the puck behind the goal. Under NHL rules, the opening of the goal is 72 inches (180 cm) wide by 48 inches (120 cm) tall, and the footprint of the goal is 40 inches (100 cm) deep.

== Method of scoring ==
In this diagram, the blue player on the right would be credited with an assist, while the blue player on the left would score the goal.

The object of the game of ice hockey is to score more goals than the opposing team. Goaltenders and defencemen are concerned primarily with keeping the other team from scoring a goal, while forwards are primarily concerned with scoring goals on the other team. Forwards also have to be defensively responsible while defencemen need to press offensively, and it is not unknown for goalies to attempt to position the puck for a counterattack, or even attempt to shoot against an unguarded net.

For a goal to be scored, the puck normally must entirely cross the goal line between the posts and under the crossbar of the goal frame. A goal is not allowed under any of the following conditions:

- the puck is sent into the goal from a stick raised above the height of the crossbar
- the puck is intentionally kicked, batted, or thrown into the net by an attacking player; a puck may deflect off an attacking player's skate or body provided that player does not make a deliberate attempt to kick or redirect the puck with their body
- the puck enters the net directly after deflecting off an official
- the goaltender is impeded from preventing the goal by an attacking player
- the scoring shot caused the scoring team to become offside, even if the team is no longer offside at the time of the goal
- the scoring team had too many people on ice at the time of the goal
- the goal was scored with a broken stick
- the net was dislodged prior to the puck entering it
- the goaltender shoots the puck after crossing the center line (however, replacing the goaltender with an extra attacker is allowed).
- the puck breaks into two or more pieces prior to any portion of it entering the goal.

Additionally, in many leagues, a goal does not count if a player from the attacking team has a skate or stick in the goal crease before the puck. The National Hockey League (NHL) abolished this rule starting in the 1999-2000 season after the disputed triple-overtime goal in the 1999 Stanley Cup Finals. Brett Hull of the Dallas Stars scored the series-clinching goal against the Buffalo Sabres with his left skate in the goal crease, but the play was not reviewed and Dallas was ultimately awarded the Cup.

A goal may be awarded if a player would normally be awarded a penalty shot, but the opposing team had substituted a skater for a goaltender. In such rare cases, a goal is awarded rather than allowing a penalty shot attempt on an empty goal net.

== Credit for goals and assists ==
Typically, the last player on the goal-scoring team to touch the puck before it goes into the net is credited with scoring that goal. Zero, one, or two other players on the goal-scoring team may also credited with an assist for helping their teammate to score the goal. If another player on the goal-scoring team touched the puck to help score the goal before the goal-scoring player touched it without an opposing player intervening (touching the puck in between), then that player gets an assist. If yet another player on the goal-scoring team also touched the puck before that without an opposing player intervening, then that player also gets an assist.

For a hockey player, a goal or an assist credited to them is also considered a point; thus the number of goals scored by that player plus the number of assists for them equals the number of points for that player. However, a rule says that only one point can be credited to any one player on a goal scored. This means one player cannot be credited with a goal and an assist for the same goal scored; instead the player would only get credit for a goal and a different player may get credit for an assist, if applicable. It also means that one player cannot be credited with two assists for the same goal scored; instead the player would only get credit for one assist and a different player may get credit for the other assist, if applicable.

Usually on a hockey team, forwards score the most goals and get the most points, although defensemen can score goals and often get assists. In professional play, goaltenders only occasionally get an assist, and only very rarely score a goal when the opposite net is empty (without a goaltender).

== Scoring statistics ==
The number of goals scored is a closely watched statistic. Each year the Rocket Richard Trophy is presented to the NHL player to have scored the most goals. The trophy is named after Maurice Richard, the first player to score 50 goals in a season, at a time when the NHL regular season was only 50 games (compared to 82 today). The player to have scored the most goals in an NHL season is Wayne Gretzky. Gretzky is also the fastest to 50 goals; during his record-setting 1981–82 season, in which he finished with 92 goals, he scored his 50th goal in the Edmonton Oilers' 39th game of the season.

The overall amount of goal scoring is also closely watched. In recent years, goal scoring has decreased. Many believe the game is less entertaining because of this, and blame the change on the increasing size of goaltending equipment and the advent of defensive systems such as the neutral zone trap. Fans of defensive hockey counter by saying the high scoring of the 1980s was an anomaly, and this shift represents a return to the norm. For the 2004-05 American Hockey League season, four major rule changes were made that were intended to increase the scoring in games and make it more popular among casual fans:

1. increasing the size of the attack zones by narrowing the neutral zone two feet each side and thus moving the goal line back two feet
2. restrictions on the goaltender playing the puck
3. permitting offside players to negate the penalty by "tagging up" with the blue line
4. changing the offside rule by permitting passes which cross the center line and one blue line (but not between both blue lines in certain restrictions).

The AHL rules were slightly modified and adopted in the NHL and ECHL for 2005-06, when the NHL returned after the 2004–05 lockout.

== Types of goals ==
There are a number of different types of goals for which separate statistics are kept, but all count equally:

- An even strength goal (EV) is a goal scored when both teams have the same number of players on the ice.
- A power play goal (PPG) is a goal scored by a team on a power play, that is, with a numerical advantage in players due to a penalty being served by one or more of the other team's players.
- A shorthanded goal (SHG) is a goal scored by a team that is on the penalty kill, that is, at a numerical disadvantage due to a penalty being served by one or more of its players
- An empty net goal (EN) is a goal scored when there is no goalie guarding the net because they have been pulled for an extra attacker
- A penalty shot goal (PS) is a goal scored on a penalty shot, that is, a one-on-one confrontation between a single offensive player and the goaltender as a result of a penalty
- An awarded goal (AWD) is a goal that is automatically awarded when a goalie has been pulled and their team commits a foul that would otherwise have triggered a penalty shot
- An own goal (OWN) is when a player puts the puck into their own net, scoring for the other team, giving goal credit to the last player on the other team to touch the puck
- An overtime goal is a goal scored in sudden-death overtime
- A go-ahead goal is the goal that puts one team ahead of another after the game has been tied
- A game-tying goal or an equaliser is a goal that causes the game to be tied, scored by a team that is down one goal (prior to the 1984-85 season, the NHL credited game-tying goals to the final scorers for both teams in tie games).
- A game-winning goal (GWG) is the goal scored to put the winning team in excess of the losing team's final score, e.g., if the score is 4–2, the game-winning goal would be the third goal scored for the winning team.

== Related terms ==
The goal judge is an official positioned off-ice behind each goal for the specific purpose of indicating when the puck has crossed the goal line and entered the goal. For arenas so equipped, the goal judge turns on a red light behind the goal when they see the puck cross the goal line. As in all matters, however, the referee retains final authority and can override the opinion of the goal judge.

The two teammates of the scorer who last touched the puck before them, provided that no opponent touched it in between, are each credited with an assist. Assists and goals count equally to comprise a player's statistical scoring total.

If a hockey player causes the puck to enter their own team's net — which in soccer is called an own goal — credit for the goal goes to the last player on the scoring team to have touched the puck. No assists are awarded. If a shot deflects off a defender and enters the net, it is not considered an own goal.

Other phrases include a garbage goal, for a goal scored more as the result of luck or opportunism than skill, and a breakaway goal for a goal scored when a player has gotten behind the defenders to face the goaltender alone.

When a player scores three goals in a game it is known as a hat-trick. A natural hat trick occurs when a player scores three consecutive goals, uninterrupted by any other player scoring for either team. A Gordie Howe hat trick occurs when a player scores a goal, gets an assist and gets in a fight.

Any puck heading towards the net is counted as a shot. When the goaltender prevents the shot from entering the net, they are credited with a save. Shots resulting in saves by the goaltender or goals scored are considered shots on goal (or shots on net). A shot which is blocked by an opposing player before it reaches the goaltender is not considered a shot on net. Also, if the puck is deflected wide of the net by another player (regardless of team) it is not counted as a shot on net. If a goaltender traps the puck that was heading towards the goal, but wide, it is often not counted as a shot; nor are shots that bounce off the crossbar or posts.

== Goal horn ==
The trend of sounding a horn when the home team scores a goal originated in the 1973 Stanley Cup Finals between the Montreal Canadiens and the Chicago Black Hawks. Black Hawks owner Bill Wirtz had the horn of his yacht installed in the team’s home arena, Chicago Stadium, and had it sound after Black Hawks goals. This practice become commonplace in professional hockey. In 2022, all goal horns are paired with a song. Some notable ones include "Lithium" by Nirvana used by the Seattle Kraken, The Fratellis' "Chelsea Dagger" used by the Chicago Blackhawks, Tim McGraw's "I Like It, I Love It", which has a couple words substituted to fit the Nashville Predators, and Ray Castoldi, the music director and organist and Madison Square Garden's "Slapshot", a song used by the New York Rangers since 1995. The Washington Capitals use personalized goal songs chosen by each player - examples include Alexander Ovechkin using "Shake, Rattle and Roll" for his goals and Aliaksei Protas using "How Much Is the Fish?".

== See also ==
- List of NHL statistical leaders
- List of goaltenders who have scored a goal in an NHL game
