= Try celebration =

Ritual celebration in rugby football

In rugby football, a try celebration is the practice of celebrating the scoring of a try. The celebration may be performed by the tryscorer (most notably), his or her teammates, the manager or coaching staff and/or the supporters of the team. Whilst referring to the celebration of a try in general, the term can also be applied to specific actions, such as a player removing his shirt or performing a somersault.

== Memorable celebrations ==
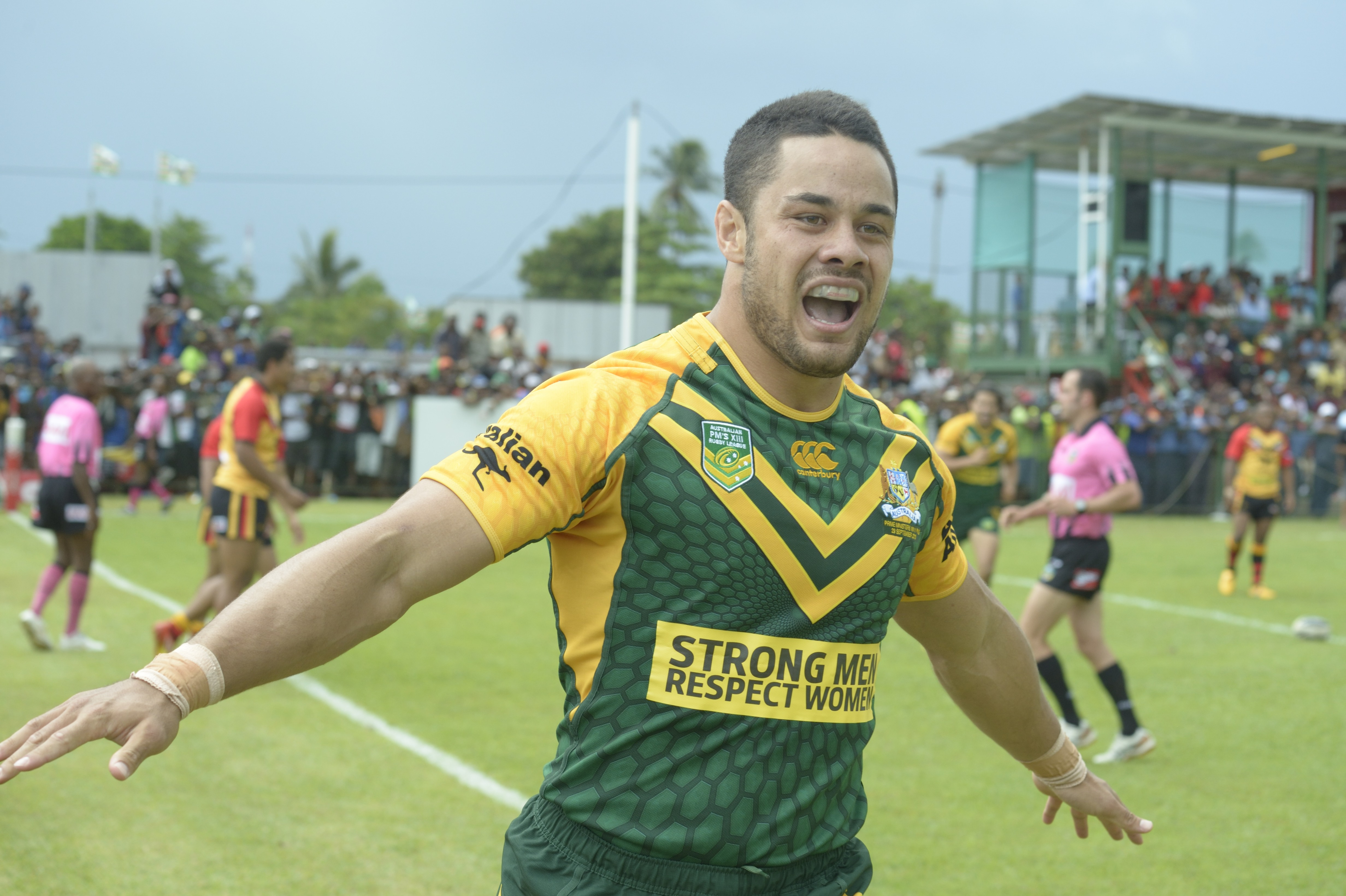
Hayne performing the Hayne Plane celebration while playing for the Australian Prime Minister's XIII in 2013.

During Jarryd Hayne's rugby league career, Hayne was known for his post-try celebration nicknamed the 'Hayne Plane'. After scoring a try he would extend both arms to the side and replicate the wings of a plane; the adjacent picture shows the 'Hayne Plane' in action.

Adam Thomson is also known as "Blond Cena" due to his interest in wrestling and his try celebration of "You can't see me", a signature taunt/gimmick by John Cena.

Peter Jorgensen scored 32 tries playing for the Panthers. It was during this time that he attracted notice for doing the "aeroplane", a post-try celebration where he would pretend to be a plane, with his arms representing wings.

Indigenous Australian rugby league footballer Greg Inglis had a signature try celebration resembling a goanna.

Benji Marshall has done the drunken goanna like Greg Inglis

Konrad Hurrell is known to blow a kiss for his mother in Tonga after scoring a try.

Tasman Mako players and fans have a tradition of raising their hand on top of their head to symbolise a shark fin whenever a try is scored. The simple gesture started in 2009 during a home game against Auckland in Nelson when Tasman captain Andrew Goodman threw up a fin after his brilliant run resulted in a try. This celebration is collegially known as "Fins Up" and has become a common hashtag amongst the team and its supporters.

== See also ==
- Goal celebration
- Touchdown celebration
