= Peter Jorgensen =

Australia international rugby union & league footballer (born 1973)

Personal information
- Full name: Peter Kostantine Jorgensen
- Born: 30 April 1973 (age 53) Australia

Playing information

Rugby union
Club
| Years | Team | Pld | T | G | FG | P |
|---|---|---|---|---|---|---|
| 199?–95 | Randwick | | | 0 | 0 |
| 1991–91 | London Welsh RFC | 5 | 5 | 0 | 0 | 20 |
| 2001–2003 | Northampton Saints | 7 | 1 | 0 | 0 | 5 |
| 2003–2004 | Rotherham Titans | 17 | 0 | 0 | 0 | 0 |
| 2005–2007 | Edinburgh | 21 | 3 | 0 | 0 | 15 |
| | Total | 50 | 9 | 0 | 0 | 40 |
Representative
| Years | Team | Pld | T | G | FG | P |
| 1992–1992 | Australia | 2 |

Rugby league
- Position: Wing
Club
| Years | Team | Pld | T | G | FG | P |
|---|---|---|---|---|---|---|
| 1995–96 | Eastern Suburbs | 34 | 20 | 0 | 0 | 80 |
| 1997–01 | Penrith Panthers | 69 | 32 | 0 | 0 | 128 |
| | Total | 103 | 52 | 0 | 0 | 208 |
Representative
| Years | Team | Pld | T | G | FG | P |
| 1996 | City Origin | 1 | 0 | 0 | 0 | 0 |
- Source: CW RLP As of 15 January 2019
- Relatives: Max Jorgensen (son)

Peter Jorgensen (born 30 April 1973) is an Australian former rugby union and professional rugby league footballer.

== Background ==
Jorgensen was educated at Newington College (1980–86) and St. Joseph's College, Hunters Hill.

== Playing career ==
A rugby union player with the Randwick club, Jorgensen played Test rugby for Australia.

Jorgensen switched rugby codes to join the Eastern Suburbs in 1995 where he played on the Wing position.

Making his debut in round 13 of the 1995 season, Jorgensen scored eight tries in the remaining ten games of the season. Jorgensen played with the Roosters for a further season, representing City Origin in 1996, before signing with the Penrith Panthers.

In 2000, Jorgensen was eligible to play for Russia in the World Cup but withdrew because the tournament clashed with his wedding.

Jorgensen scored 32 tries playing for the Panthers. It was during this time that he attracted notice for doing the "aeroplane", a post-try celebration where he would pretend to be a plane, with his arms representing wings.

In 2002, Jorgensen returned to rugby union joining English club Northampton Saints. From Northampton, Jorgensen went on to play two seasons for Rotherham before signing for Edinburgh where he played two more seasons before finishing his career.

== Post playing ==
In June 2007, Jorgensen returned to Australia with his wife and two young sons and resumed work as a stockbroker. Frank Puletua is Jorgensen's brother-in-law.
