= Ickey Shuffle =

Touchdown celebration

The Ickey Shuffle was a touchdown celebration performed by National Football League (NFL) fullback Elbert "Ickey" Woods, who played for the Cincinnati Bengals. After scoring a touchdown, Woods would shuffle his feet to the right and hold the football out to the right, shuffle his feet to the left and hold the football out to the left, and finally finish by doing three hops to the right and spiking the football into the ground. Woods performed this polished official version of the dance for the first time during the 1988 Cincinnati Bengals season, after scoring against the New York Jets on October 10, 1988. The move led to the NFL creating a rule designating it (and similar moves by other players) as "Excessive Celebration" and subject to penalty against the player's team. The dance was in danger of being prohibited by NFL rules concerning planned celebrations, but after investigation, was not banned.

Since Woods' playing days, the dance has made multiple appearances in mainstream media including a GEICO commercial, in which Woods himself performs the dance. In addition, the dance is featured in an episode of the television sitcom How I Met Your Mother. Woods stated that most of the money he has earned as a product of the Ickey Shuffle's popularity, including his earnings from the GEICO commercial, has ultimately gone towards his foundation that is dedicated to raising money for asthma research, the Jovante Woods Foundation. Darrell Waltrip performed the dance while celebrating his 1989 Daytona 500 win in victory lane. The "Ickey Shuffle" has also been adopted as the name for a common speed and agility drill that utilizes a similar kind of lateral rhythmic stepping, somewhat derivative of the famous dance itself.

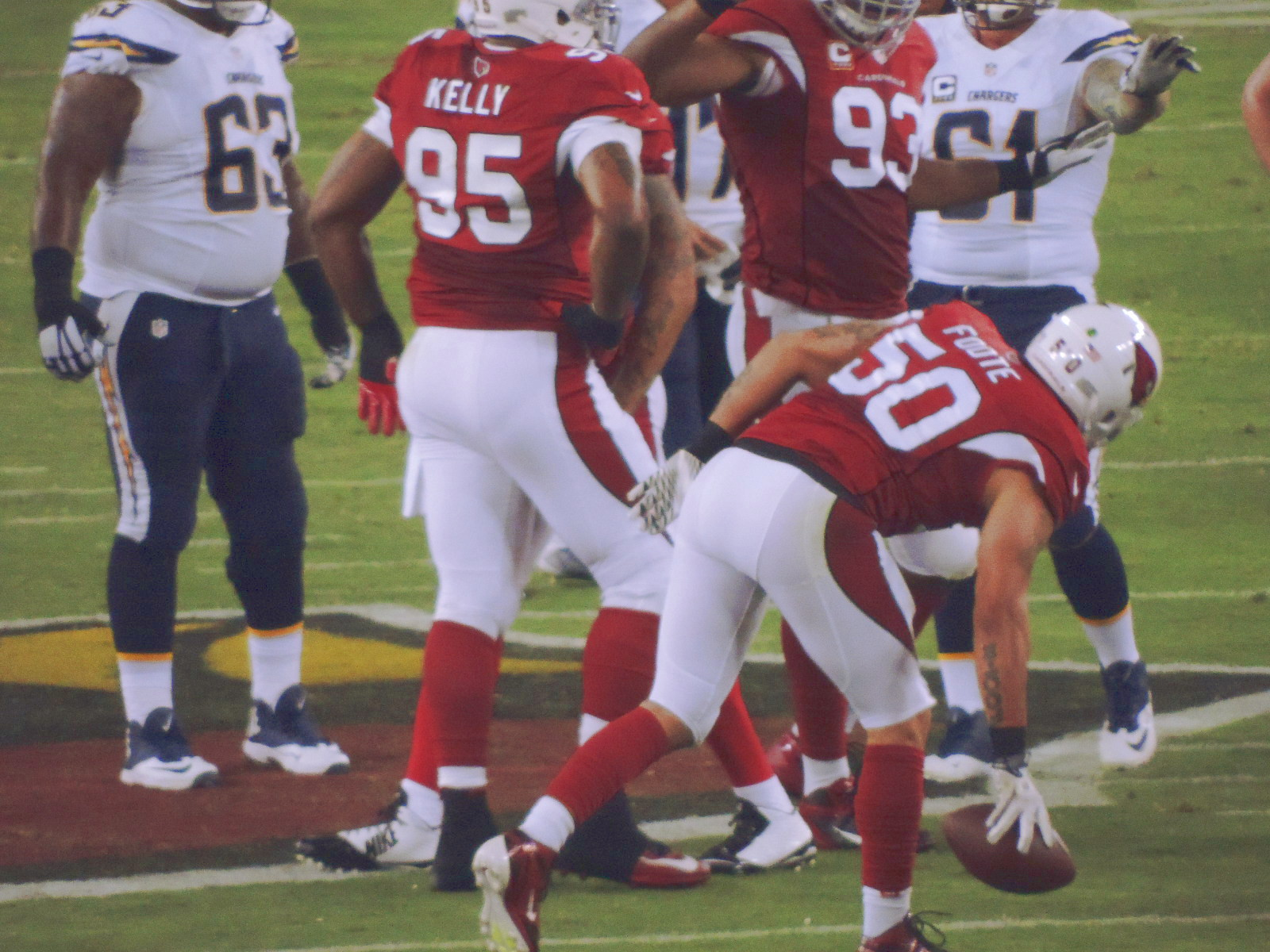
Arizona Cardinals Larry Foote does the Ickey Shuffle

== Origin ==
In an interview performed on an episode of Inside the NFL Woods said that before he and the Cincinnati Bengals played the Cleveland Browns on September 25, 1988, he told his mother that if he happened to score during the game, he would do a dance. After scoring, Woods did a modified, simpler version of the famous dance that included no steps. After receiving criticism on the quality of the dance from his teammate, Rick Dixon, Woods decided to add some steps to it. After workshopping his celebration from the previous game, Woods came out against the New York Jets on October 10, 1988, and performed what is now known as the "Ickey Shuffle" for the first times following the two touchdowns he scored on that day.

== Media ==
=== GEICO Commercials ===
In 2014, GEICO ran a commercial centered around the dance. Initially, in the taping of the commercial, GEICO had Woods shoot 3 separate versions in 3 different contexts, with each one featuring Woods perform the Ickey Shuffle in a celebratory fashion. In the version that GEICO chose to air, Woods performs the Ickey Shuffle within a supermarket, celebrating the meat slicer calling out his ticket number “44”. In addition to this televised commercial, Geico also filmed more short clips of Woods performing the shuffle and exclaiming about a number of different scenarios, such as: “Awkward”, “Your new profile pic is totally casual”, “Game Over”, “It’s Humpday!” and many more.

=== How I Met Your Mother ===
The Ickey Shuffle also makes an appearance on How I Met Your Mother in season 1 episode 4, “Return of the Shirt”. Barney Stinson, played by Neil Patrick Harris, performs the dance.

=== Justified ===
The Ickey Shuffle is referenced at the end of episode 9 in season 6, the final season of the show by Raylan Givens, played by Timothy Olyphant. He likens it to celebrating the victory of an ongoing case.

== Speed and agility drill ==
There is now a common agility drill, also referred to as the Ickey Shuffle, which utilizes footwork similar to that of the famous dance. This drill is most commonly performed with the aid of a speed ladder but can also be done with the use of cones. (Note: These attached links contain video demonstrations with detailed instructions on how to do the Ickey Shuffle drill.) The purpose of the drill is to build foot speed and overall agility. The drill is performed by weaving in and out of the squares on a speed ladder, shuffling one's feet back and forth from one side of the ladder back to the other.
