= Touchdown celebration =

Celebrations in gridiron football

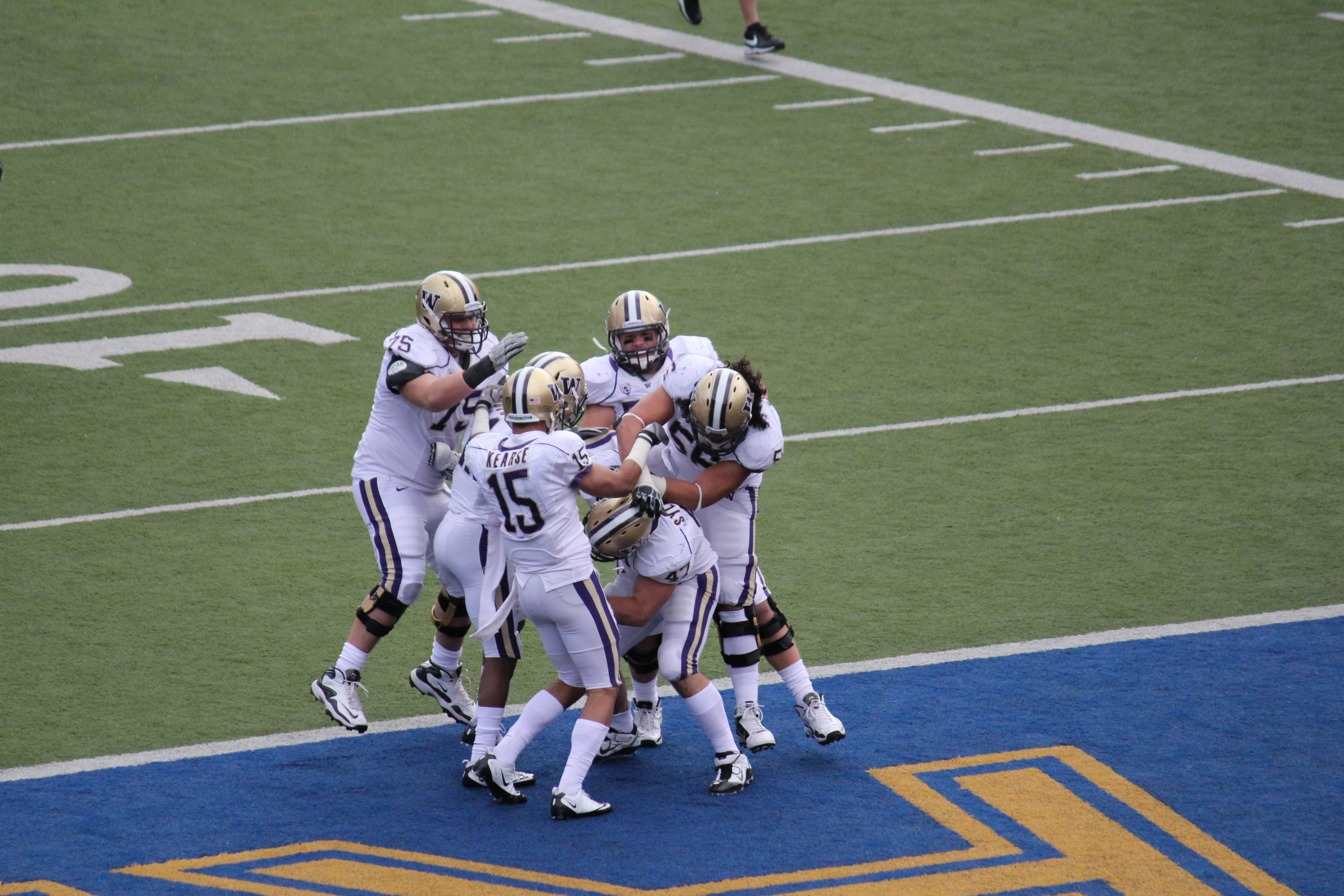
Washington Huskies players celebrate a touchdown

In gridiron football, touchdown celebrations are sometimes performed after the scoring of a touchdown. Individual celebrations have become increasingly complex over time, from simple "spiking" of the football in decades past to the elaborately choreographed displays of the current era. A touchdown celebration is a gesture, dance, or routine performed by a player immediately after scoring a touchdown in gridiron football (American or Canadian). It may range from a brief spike of the ball to an elaborate choreographed dance or team ritual. Over recent years, celebrations have also drawn social media attention and been subject to league-rule changes, fines and global influence.

== NFL football ==
Taunting and disruptive or showy celebration are both offenses in the National Football League (NFL); as a result, gaudy displays are often frowned upon. If the league views the act as highly offensive, large fines and even suspensions can be issued. In 2006 the NFL, in an effort to cut down on celebrations, amended its rules to include an automatic 15-yard penalty against any player who left his feet or uses a prop, like a towel, the goal post or post base or more specifically the football. The penalty was called as "excessive celebration", and the yardage was charged against the offending player's team when that team kicked off to the opposing team. The excessive celebration rule was severely scaled back in 2017; penalties for excessive celebration will henceforth only be called for using the goalposts as a prop (to avoid inadvertently warping the goalposts out of place), lewd or violent gestures, or prolonged celebrations intended to delay the game. Other restrictions still in place include the usage of outside props and any person not on the active roster for that game leaving the team box to celebrate (including inactive players or coaches); the penalty was also revised in 2019 to give the defensive team the option of enforcing the penalty on the extra point attempt, which could potentially push an extra point kick out to 48 yards and make it far less certain to be converted.

Simply "spiking" the ball is not interpreted as excessive celebration unless the ball is spiked towards another player on the opposing team. Jumping onto the outer wall to accept contact from fans, such as the Lambeau Leap, is also not considered such, as it is off the field of play.

== NCAA football ==
College football, governed by the NCAA also penalizes excessive celebrations with a 15-yard penalty. NCAA Football Rule 9-2, Article 1(a)(1)(d) prohibits "Any delayed, excessive, prolonged or choreographed act by which a player (or players) attempts to focus attention upon himself (or themselves)"; in addition, Rule 9-2, Article 1(a)(2) asserts that "After a score or any other play, the player in possession immediately must return the ball to an official or leave it near the dead-ball spot." Additionally, if a player's actions are considered "unsportsmanlike conduct" the result is dead-ball foul; a "flagrant unsportsmanlike conduct" foul requires player ejection. If a player's nonfootball-related act (e.g. taunting or cursing) causes an opponent to physically retaliate, it is considered fighting and both players are ejected.

== Arena football ==
The rules for celebrations in the Arena Football League were the same as the NFL; no props were allowed. However, choreographed or group dances were often seen after a score.

== AAF ==
In the Alliance of American Football, it was an unsportsmanlike conduct penalty to propel the ball out of the field of play during a touchdown celebration. This "no souvenirs" rule was in place so that the AAF would not lose possession of the electronic tracking apparatus embedded in each ball.

== CFL football ==
=== Player celebrations ===
The Canadian Football League is much more lenient than the NFL when it comes to touchdown dances. It often has very small, if any, penalties handed out to players who celebrate excessively.

CFL end zone celebrations often include more than one player, often a whole wide receiving corps of 4-6 players. Past celebrations have included five Calgary Stampeders receivers holding out their hands and mimicking the pouring of drinks from a champagne bottle, then stumbling around as if drunk; another end-zone routine simulated a bobsleigh run when receiver Jeremaine Copeland sat down and wrapped his legs around the goal-line pylon with the rest of the receiving corps tucked in behind him. The same group also pantomimed a four-seater stationary bicycle, which all players played a role for the bicycle.

Edmonton Eskimos punt returner Henry "Gizmo" Williams celebrated punt return touchdowns by doing a backflip in the end zone.

The Winnipeg Blue Bombers have a celebration whereby players form a circle, toss a football into the air in the center of the circle and then fall directly backwards in unison when the ball lands on the ground as if a hand grenade has exploded.

In the 2008 CFL season, the Winnipeg receiving corps did a few celebrations, most notably a version of Duck, Duck, Goose, as well as a walking race across the end zone.

In the 2009 CFL season, the Hamilton Tiger-Cats did a memorable celebration in Winnipeg, as a fishing boat was at the edge of the end zone. Hamilton scored two touchdowns within a minute, both times got into the boat and celebrating as though they were fishing, literally showboating.

During the August 14, 2010, a celebration by the Toronto Argonauts in which several players mimicked a rowing crew drew an Objectionable Conduct penalty.

In the 2018 CFL season, Ottawa Redblacks offensive lineman Jon Gott chugged a beer after teammate Mossis Madu scored a touchdown during the final game of the regular season against the Toronto Argonauts. Although Gott was not penalized, fined or suspended for the action due to the league relaxing its rules on touchdown celebrations, the CFL subsequently revised their policy to prohibit the use of alcohol or drugs or the mimicking thereof.

=== Stadium celebrations ===
Long-standing tradition at McMahon Stadium has a horse run the length of the stadium with a team flag each time the hometown Calgary Stampeders scores a touchdown. The Montreal Alouettes' touchdown celebration is similar; it features a man carrying an Alouettes flag and running across the field every time the Alouettes score six points at Percival Molson Memorial Stadium. Other stadiums have developed similar traditions. The Winnipeg Blue Bombers have a small airplane (known as the "touchdown plane"), along with a cannon blast that goes off after every score. The Saskatchewan Roughriders fire smoke mortars from behind the goalposts in celebration of home team touchdowns. The Edmonton Elks have a fire engine circle the field after each touchdown, throwing souvenirs into the crowd.

== Memorable celebrations ==
- The "touchdown spike": New York Giants wide receiver Homer Jones is credited as the first player to throw the ball into the field at his feet after scoring a touchdown. He first did this move in 1965, calling it a "spike", and it is said to be the origin of post-touchdown celebrations.
- In 1969, Elmo Wright, a junior wide receiver for the University of Houston, began celebrating his touchdown receptions with a 'celebratory' end zone dance. In his rookie year with the Kansas City Chiefs, he caught a touchdown pass in a game on Oct. 24, 1971, against the Washington Redskins and celebrated with what some believe was the first end zone dance in NFL history.
- The 1980s Washington Redskins "The Fun Bunch": The 1983 Washington Redskins raised the bar on celebrations by performing a group high-five after scoring. The NFL had made previous attempts to curb celebrations but, after the 1983 Fun Bunch, they changed the rules and "excessive celebration" was disallowed. This is one of the few offensive squads that have managed to acquire a nickname.
- In his rookie season of 1988, Cincinnati Bengals running back Ickey Woods gained media attention with a touchdown dance that became known as the "Ickey Shuffle."
- Animals of all different sorts can lend their names to touchdown dances. Baltimore Ravens wide receiver Kelley Washington is known for his distinctive touchdown celebration dubbed "The Squirrel" (which originated with his former team the Cincinnati Bengals). Former Detroit Lions and Kansas City Chiefs wide receiver Johnnie Morton liked to celebrate with "The Worm." And during his tenure with the San Francisco 49ers, defensive back Merton Hanks became famous for his unique "Funky Chicken" dance after scoring on interception returns.
- On December 15, 2003, at a game between the New York Giants and the New Orleans Saints, after his second touchdown, Saints wide receiver Joe Horn pulled a cell phone out from under the padding on the goalpost, and pretended to make a call. Unsportsmanlike conduct was called on Horn, and he was fined $30,000 by the NFL as a result.
- On January 9, 2005, Minnesota Vikings wide receiver Randy Moss celebrated a touchdown against division rivals the Green Bay Packers by pantomiming pulling down his pants to moon the Green Bay fans. Fox commentator Joe Buck called it "a disgusting act", and Moss would later be fined $10,000 for his actions.
- On September 26, 2010, Buffalo Bills wide receiver Stevie Johnson imitated a minuteman firing a musket and then falling backwards pretending to be shot at Gillette Stadium after scoring a fourth-quarter touchdown against the New England Patriots, for which he received a $10,000 fine. In a Week 11 win over the Cincinnati Bengals, after scoring his first touchdown, Johnson lifted his jersey to reveal the question "Why so serious?" written on his T-shirt (a quote made famous by The Joker in the Batman movie sequel The Dark Knight), which was directed at Bengals wide receivers Terrell Owens and Chad Ochocinco, who referred to themselves as Batman and Robin, and Johnson was fined $5,000 by the league office for the celebration.
- During the 2010 and 2011 seasons, Green Bay Packers quarterback Aaron Rodgers performed the "championship belt" move after touchdowns, imitating putting on a boxing or wrestling championship belt. After the Packers won Super Bowl XLV, Rodgers was presented with a replica Big Gold Belt by teammates, and in the following weeks, during a scheduled WWE Raw telecast, the Packers were honored with title belts from the WWE itself. In a series of State Farm commercials that aired during the 2011 season, Rodgers and a State Farm representative argued whether the move was a touchdown dance or the "discount double check" dance to celebrate saving money on insurance.
- Rob Gronkowski has been credited in resurrecting the spiking as a touchdown celebration and making it his own. His signature Gronk Spike has been a product of the less restrictive scoring celebrations of the NFL compared to high school and college, and debuted on September 26, 2010, after scoring his second NFL touchdown. It had become a fan phenomenon with MIT Sloan Sports Analytics Conference calculating that Gronkowski's arm moves 130° with the football leaving his hand at 60-miles per hour delivering 650 lbs of force.
- On October 21, 2012, Mike Tolbert of the Carolina Panthers and Stevie Johnson of the Buffalo Bills did the "Gangnam Style" dance in their Week 7 games.
- A November 21, 2013, matchup at the Georgia Dome between division rivals the New Orleans Saints and Atlanta Falcons was halted for several minutes when Saints tight end Jimmy Graham celebrated a touchdown score with a goalpost "dunk" where he pulled the left side of the standard down, forcing a delay while field maintenance crews brought the posts back level using a bubble level and rubber band. The practice of dunking over the goalposts was subsequently made into a penalty due to this delay.
- On December 21, 2014, at State Farm Stadium in Arizona, Marshawn Lynch jumped and grabbed his crotch as he crossed the goal line. He was fined $11,050.
- In Super Bowl XLIX, Doug Baldwin scored what turned out to be the Seattle Seahawks' last touchdown of the season as they failed to repeat as Super Bowl champions. Baldwin celebrated the touchdown with a vulgar pantomime which gained significant attention on social media as the "poopdown", and which earned a 15-yard penalty for unsportsmanlike conduct. He commented after the game that the celebration was directed at an unnamed group, who were not present at the game. He was later fined $11,025 for his actions by the NFL.
- On December 6, 2015, at Heinz Field, Pittsburgh Steelers wide receiver Antonio Brown charged into the goalpost pylon after returning a punt for 71 yards for a touchdown against the Indianapolis Colts. He was penalized 15 yards for "using the goalpost as a prop" and later fined $11,576 by the NFL.
- On October 9, 2016, Cleveland Browns receiver Andrew Hawkins mocked the NFL's excessive celebration policy by, after scoring a touchdown against the New England Patriots, by simply placing the ball back on the ground and robotically running away.
- The “Griddy” dance, created by high school player Allen Davis in 2018 and popularised in the NFL by Justin Jefferson, became a dominant celebration trend in the 2020s.
- In 2024, Lions wide receiver Jameson Williams, after scoring a 70-yard touchdown, celebrated by performing a thunderous dunk under the goal-posts.

== Modern era and social-media era ==
In the 2020s, touchdown celebrations have increasingly gone viral on social media platforms. For example, in February 2025, wide receiver A.J. Brown acknowledged that his end-zone "Cha-Cha Slide" celebration was suggested by quarterback Jameis Winston.

Also, league enforcement continues to evolve. In November 2025, running back Rico Dowdle of the Carolina Panthers was penalised and fined for a pelvic-thrust celebration, reaffirming that even brief or subtle gestures may be flagged.

== Effect on game play ==
It has been argued that celebration penalties have affected the outcomes of games.

The September 6, 2008, game between Washington and BYU saw the Washington quarterback, Jake Locker, score a touchdown, putting Washington within one point with two seconds to go. Upon entering the endzone, however, Locker threw the ball high in the air. His team was penalized, the referee applying NCAA Rule 9-2, Article 1(a)(2), which states that "after a score or any other play, the player in possession immediately must return the ball to an official or leave it near the dead-ball spot," paragraph (c) of which forbids "throwing the ball high into the air." BYU blocked the ensuing 38-yard extra point attempt and won the game. On December 30, 2010, Kansas State's Adrian Hillburn scored a 30-yard touchdown catch with 1:08 left in the 2010 New Era Pinstripe Bowl against Syracuse, narrowing the score to 36–34. He subsequently saluted the crowd in a quick military fashion and was flagged for unsportsmanlike conduct. The penalty pushed Kansas State's 2-point conversion attempt (to tie the game and possibly force it into overtime) back to the 18-yard line. Kansas State then missed the 2-point conversion, and Syracuse went on to win the game.

== See also ==
- Goal celebration
- Try celebration
- Griddy
