= Statue of Bobby Orr =

Statue in Boston, Massachusetts, U.S.

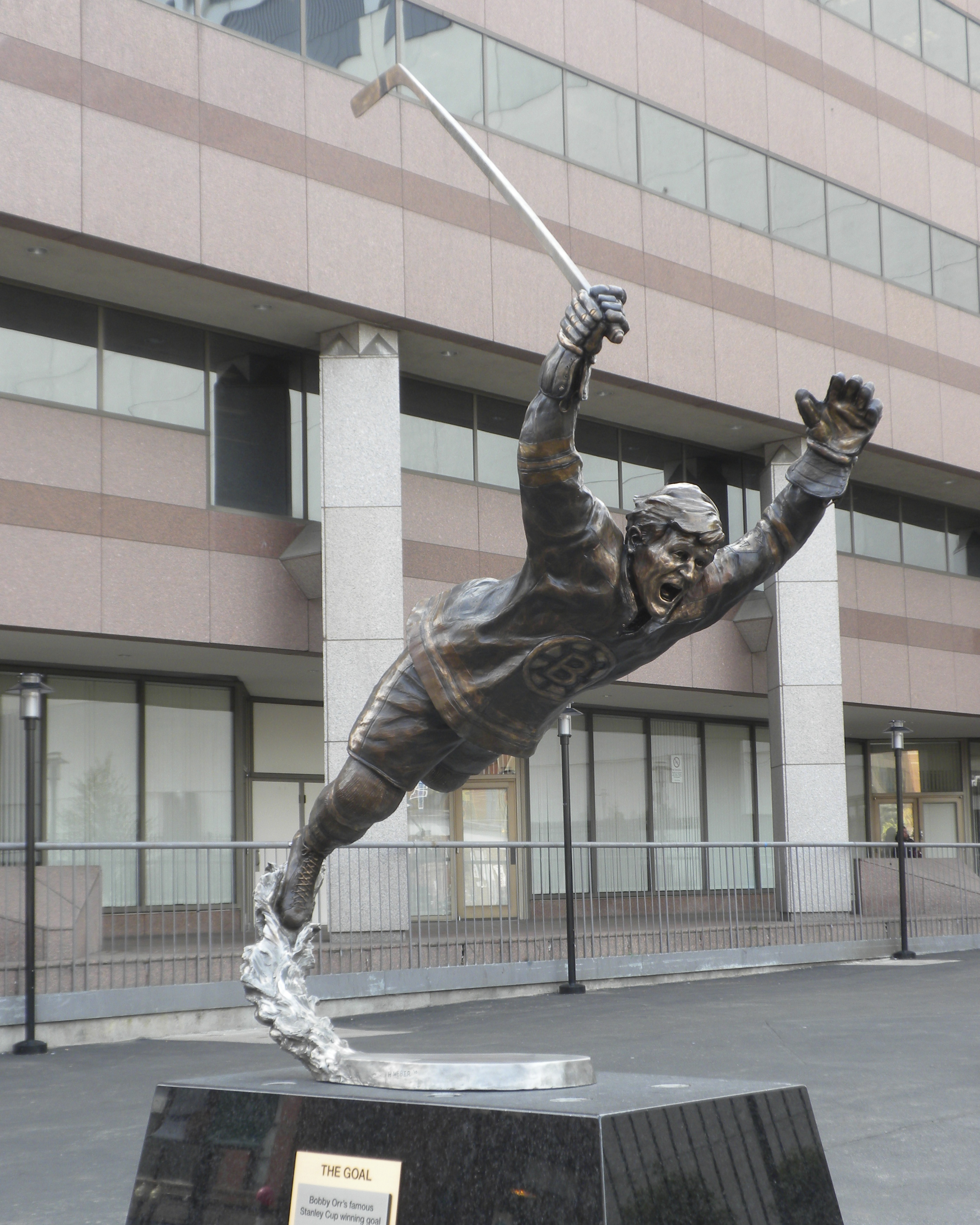
- The statue in 2010
- Year: 2010
- Medium: Bronze sculpture
- Subject: Bobby Orr
- Location: Boston, Massachusetts, U.S.; 42.366169°N 71.060304°W

An 800-pound (360 kg) bronze statue of Bobby Orr is installed outside Boston's TD Garden, in the U.S. state of Massachusetts. The sculpture was designed by Harry Weber, and unveiled on May 10, 2010.

== See also ==
- 1970 Stanley Cup Finals
