= Slapshot (song) =

Song by Bad Apple
- Published: January 20, 1995
- Genre: Rock
- Length: 1:32
- Composer: Ray Castoldi

Audio sample
- file; help

"Slapshot" is a 1995 song written by Ray Castoldi, the music director and organist for Madison Square Garden. The song was written as a goal song for the New York Rangers and was debuted on January 20, 1995, in Madison Square Garden. The Ontario Hockey League's Kitchener Rangers also use the horn, along with the same or similar horn. The recording of the song that is used by the Rangers at their home games was created by local rock band Bad Apple.

== Composition and recording ==
During the 1994–95 NHL lockout, the New York Rangers sought to create a goal song that was unique to the Rangers and would not receive radio airtime. This followed the victory of the New York Rangers in the 1994 Stanley Cup Playoffs, and Ray Castoldi, the music director and organist for Madison Square Garden, found inspiration to write a song that would become what he later described as a "signature song" for the Rangers, by whom he was commissioned. The original lyrics of the song, written by Castoldi, contained several instances of the word "goal", with Castoldi intending the song to inspire fans to chant "goal" following Rangers' goals. However, during a recording session with local rock band Bad Apple, the lyrics were modified to substitute the word "woah" for each instance of "goal" in the song's chorus for reasons of acoustics.

The recording was first publicly played on January 20, 1995, at a New York Rangers game in Madison Square Garden.

== Use by the New York Rangers ==
As the goal song for the New York Rangers, a portion of "Slapshot" typically thirty-five to forty seconds in length plays following the goal horn every time Rangers score a goal at home. Fans sing along to the song, whose lyrics begin with a loudly chanted "Woah" and later include a pattern of voiced "Hey!"s.

=== Reception ===
Of goal songs used in the National Hockey League, "Slapshot" is widely considered to be among the best. The song, while it initially did not impress the fanbase of the New York Rangers, has since become a song near and dear to Rangers fans. The popularity of the song has been so great that it has inspired other NHL teams to commission similar goal songs.

Writing for The Wall Street Journal, Dave Caldwell noted that the Rangers have not won a Stanley Cup since they unveiled "Slapshot" in 1995, calling it "the curse of the Rangers' goal song".

== Use by the Kitchener Rangers ==
The Kitchener Rangers, a Major Junior hockey team in Kitchener, Ontario, Canada, use an air raid siren after the horn silences. The song starts at the instrumental, then transitions into the "Hey!"s as opposed to the New York Rangers, who transition into the "Woah"s. Lastly, fans of the junior hockey team chant "Let's go Ran-gers!" in between the "Woahs."
