= Benjamin Fischer (footballer) =

Liechtensteiner footballer (born 1980)

Ben Fischer
Personal information
- Full name: Benjamin Fischer
- Date of birth: 19 October 1980 (age 46)
- Place of birth: Grabs, Switzerland
- Height: 1.74 m (5 ft 8 1/2 in)
- Position: Striker

Youth career
- 1996–1998: Grasshopper Club Zürich

Senior career*
Years	Team	Apps	(Gls)
1998–1999	USV Eschen/Mauren	28	(20)
1999–2001	FC Vaduz	38	(27)
2001–2002	FC Chur 97	47	(38)
2003–2009	FC Vaduz	129	(37)
2010	FC Chiasso	14	(7)
2010–2011	FC Vaduz	11	(0)
Total		267	(129)

International career
2005–2011	Liechtenstein	23	(2)
- * Club domestic league appearances and goals

Benjamin Fischer (born 19 October 1980) is a retired footballer who played as a striker. Born in Switzerland, he represented the Liechtenstein national team.

== Career ==
He began his career with the Swiss club Grasshopper Club Zürich in the youth team.

In February 2011, he retired from professional football following a recurrence of back and thigh injuries.

== International career ==
Fischer nearly made history when, in the final qualifier for World Cup 2006 in Germany against Portugal, who needed a point to qualify, he scored a 32nd minute opening goal. However, Liechtenstein were unable to keep their lead, with a Pauleta equaliser and an 85th minute Nuno Gomes winning goal turning the game on its head for a second time.

== International goals ==
Date	Venue	Opponent	Score	Result	Competition
7 September 2005	Rheinpark Stadion, Vaduz, Liechtenstein	Luxembourg	2-0	3-0	2006 FIFA World Cup Qualifying
8 October 2005	Estádio Municipal de Aveiro, Aveiro, Portugal	Portugal	0-1	2-1	2006 FIFA World Cup Qualifying

== Honours ==
=== Club ===
Vaduz

- 1. Liga Promotion (1): 2000–01
- Liechtensteiner Cup (9): 1999–00, 2000–01, 2003–04, 2004–05, 2005–06, 2006–07, 2007–08, 2008–09, 2010–11,

Individual

- Liechtensteiner Footballer of the Year: 2003–04
