= Martin Stocklasa =

Liechtenstein footballer (born 1979)

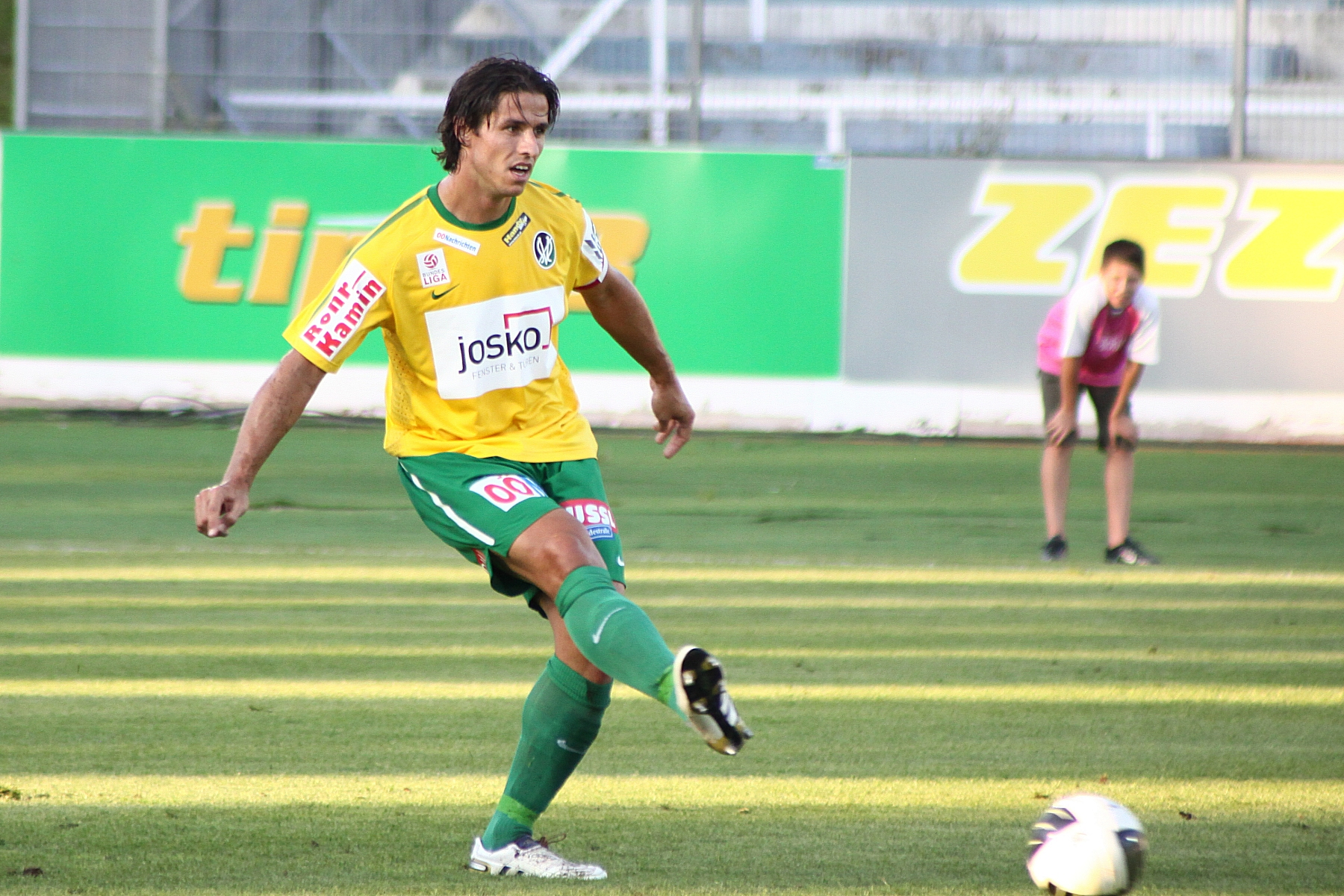
- Stocklasa with SV Ried in 2010

Personal information
- Date of birth: 29 May 1979 (age 47)
- Place of birth: Grabs, Switzerland
- Height: 1.90 m (6 ft 3 in)
- Positions: Centre-back; right-back

Youth career
- 1989–1997: USV Eschen/Mauren

Senior career*
Years	Team	Apps	(Gls)
1997–1999	FC Vaduz	0	(0)
1999–2002	FC Zürich	42	(0)
2000–2001	→ SC Kriens (loan)	28	(1)
2002–2006	FC Vaduz	123	(10)
2006–2008	Dynamo Dresden	60	(2)
2008–2011	SV Ried	92	(6)
2011–2014	St. Gallen	61	(1)
Total		406	(20)

International career
1996–2014	Liechtenstein	113	(5)

Managerial career
- 2019–2020: Liechtenstein U-21
- 2020–2023: Liechtenstein
- 2023–2024: FC Vaduz
- * Club domestic league appearances and goals

Martin Stocklasa (born 29 May 1979) is a Liechtenstein football manager and former player who played as a defender. He was most recently the manager of Liechtenstein club FC Vaduz, who play in the Swiss Challenge League, the second tier of Swiss football.

He played for FC Zürich, FC Vaduz, Dynamo Dresden and SV Ried. Stocklasa, and his brother, Michael (now retired), both represented Liechtenstein at the international level and at the time of his retirement, Martin had 113 caps, which tied him with Mario Frick atop his country's appearances list.

== Club career ==
Born in Grabs, Switzerland, Stocklasa started his senior career at FC Vaduz in 1997 and moved to Swiss side FC Zürich in the summer of 1999. He went on to spend the entire 2000–01 season on loan to SC Kriens, another Swiss club, and returned to FC Zürich for one season before eventually returning to his first club, FC Vaduz, in the summer of 2002 and spending four seasons there before moving to Dynamo Dresden. Stocklasa had been linked with a move to English club Leeds United, prior to his joining SV Ried. He joined FC St. Gallen, of the Swiss Challenge League, after leaving SV Ried in 2011.

In June 2014, Stocklasa announced his retirement from the game.

== International career ==
Stocklasa was capped 113 times by his country, scoring five goals, and was the team captain. He made his international debut for Liechtenstein in their 5–0 defeat to the Republic of Ireland in a 1998 FIFA World Cup qualifier on 31 August 1996. Stocklasa was the first and currently the only Liechtenstein player to have scored a hat trick in an international game. The achievement came on 17 April 2002, against Luxembourg, in an international friendly.

== Managerial career ==
Stocklasa was the manager of the Liechtenstein U-21 team from 6 February 2019 until December 2020. He was the manager for the U-21's first ever win, a 1–0 victory over Azerbaijan on 6 June 2019.

He was then appointed Liechtenstein's senior team manager, following the departure of Helgi Kolviðsson.

On 1 March 2023, it was announced that he cancelled his contract with the Liechtenstein Football Association to join FC Vaduz. At the time of his appointment, Vaduz were in ninth place (out of ten) in the Swiss Challenge League. Under Stocklasa, Vaduz were able to stabilise, losing only three of the remaining 15 games of the season, finishing in eight place with a 13 point buffer on the relegation play-off spot.

Nearly a year after his appointment, he was dismissed by Vaduz on 12 February 2024. Despite a good start to the season, a poor run of form starting at the end of September 2023, with Vaduz managing just one win in 14 games, including a twelve game winless streak. He also oversaw Vaduz's elimination in the first round of UEFA Europa Conference League qualifying, losing 3–2 on aggregate to Belarusian side FC Neman Grodno.

== Career statistics ==
#	Date	Venue	Opponent	Score	Result	Competition
1.	7 June 2000	Dreisamstadion, Freiburg, Germany	Germany	1–1	2–8	Friendly match
2.	17 April 2002	Stade Alphonse Theis, Hesperange, Luxembourg	Luxembourg	1–0	3–3	Friendly match
3.	17 April 2002	Stade Alphonse Theis, Hesperange, Luxembourg	Luxembourg	2–0	3–3	Friendly match
4.	17 April 2002	Stade Alphonse Theis, Hesperange, Luxembourg	Luxembourg	3–0	3–3	Friendly match
5.	13 October 2004	Stade Josy Barthel, Luxembourg City, Luxembourg	Luxembourg	1–0	4–0	2006 FIFA World Cup Qualifying

== Managerial statistics ==
As of 12 February 2024

Team	From	To	Record				
Team	From	To	G	W	D	L	Win %
Liechtenstein	3 December 2020	1 March 2023	22	0	1	21	0.00
FC Vaduz	1 March 2023	12 February 2024	40	13	13	14	32.50

== Honours ==
=== As player ===
FC Vaduz

- Liechtenstein Cup: 1997–98, 1998–99, 2002–03, 2003–04, 2004–05, 2005–06

FC Zürich

- Swiss Cup* 1999–2000

SV Ried

- Austrian Cup: 2010–11

Individual

- Liechtensteiner Footballer of the Year: 1997–98, 1999–2000, 2009, 2010, 2011

=== As manager ===
FC Vaduz

- Liechtenstein Cup: 2022–23

== See also ==
- List of men's footballers with 100 or more international caps
