= Benjamin Büchel =

Liechtensteiner footballer

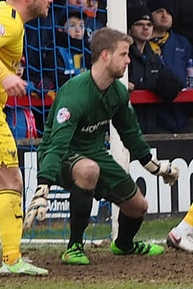
- Büchel playing for Oxford United in 2016.

Personal information
- Date of birth: 4 July 1989 (age 37)
- Place of birth: Ruggell, Liechtenstein
- Height: 1.87 m (6 ft 1 1/2 in)
- Position: Goalkeeper

Team information
- Current team: Vaduz
- Number: 1

Senior career*
Years	Team	Apps	(Gls)
2006–2008	FC Ruggell	2	(0)
2008–2009	FC Widnau	31	(0)
2009–2012	USV Eschen/Mauren	74	(0)
2012–2015	Bournemouth	0	(0)
2013	→ Dorchester Town (loan)	3	(0)
2013	→ Poole Town (loan)	6	(0)
2014	→ Havant & Waterlooville (loan)	18	(0)
2014	→ Welling United (loan)	8	(0)
2015–2017	Oxford United	23	(0)
2017	→ Barnet (loan)	4	(0)
2017–2018	FC Thalwil	4	(0)
2018–	Vaduz	194	(0)

International career^{‡}
2008–	Liechtenstein	87	(0)
- * Club domestic league appearances and goals as of 28 September 2026 ‡ National team caps and goals as of 16:11, 16 November 2026 (UTC)

Benjamin Büchel (born 4 July 1989) is a Liechtensteiner professional footballer who plays as a goalkeeper for Liechtensteiner Swiss Super League club Vaduz, which he captains, and the Liechtenstein national team.

== Club career ==
Born in Ruggell, Büchel spent his early career in Liechtenstein with FC Ruggell and USV Eschen/Mauren, as well as Swiss club FC Widnau.

He signed a six-month contract with English club Bournemouth in August 2012. In doing so he became the second player from Liechtenstein to play in England (after Franz Burgmeier, who played for Darlington in the 2008–09 season), and only the fourth Liechtensteiner to play outside the country.

He signed a one-month loan deal with Dorchester Town in February 2013, making three league appearances for the club.

In December 2013 he joined Southern Football League side Poole Town on loan until 18 January 2014, making 6 league appearances for them.

In February 2014 he moved on loan to Havant & Waterlooville, where he made 18 league appearances.

In October 2014 he moved on loan to Welling United.

He was released by Bournemouth at the end of the 2014–15 season, and joined Oxford United in September 2015. On 6 October 2015, he made his debut for Oxford United in a 2–0 win against close rivals Swindon Town in the Football League Trophy. He shared first-choice goalkeeping duties with Sam Slocombe for the 2015–16 season, both keepers making 23 League appearances, but the appointment of Simon Eastwood meant he failed to make any appearances in the first half of the following season and he was told he was free to leave during the January transfer window.

Büchel joined Barnet on an emergency loan in March 2017 and was released by Oxford in May 2017, after the end of the 2016–17 season.

== International career ==
He made his international debut for Liechtenstein in 2008, as a substitute in a friendly against Slovakia.

In 2022, he was named Liechtenstein Footballer of the Year. He won the award again in 2023, as well as 2024.

== Honours ==
USV Eschen/Mauren

- Liechtenstein Cup winner: 2011–12

Oxford United

- Football League Trophy runner-up: 2015–16

FC Vaduz

- Liechtenstein Cup winner: 2021–22, 2022–23, 2023–24

Individual

- Liechtensteiner Footballer of the Year: 2022, 2023, 2024
