= Peter Jehle =

Liechtensteiner footballer

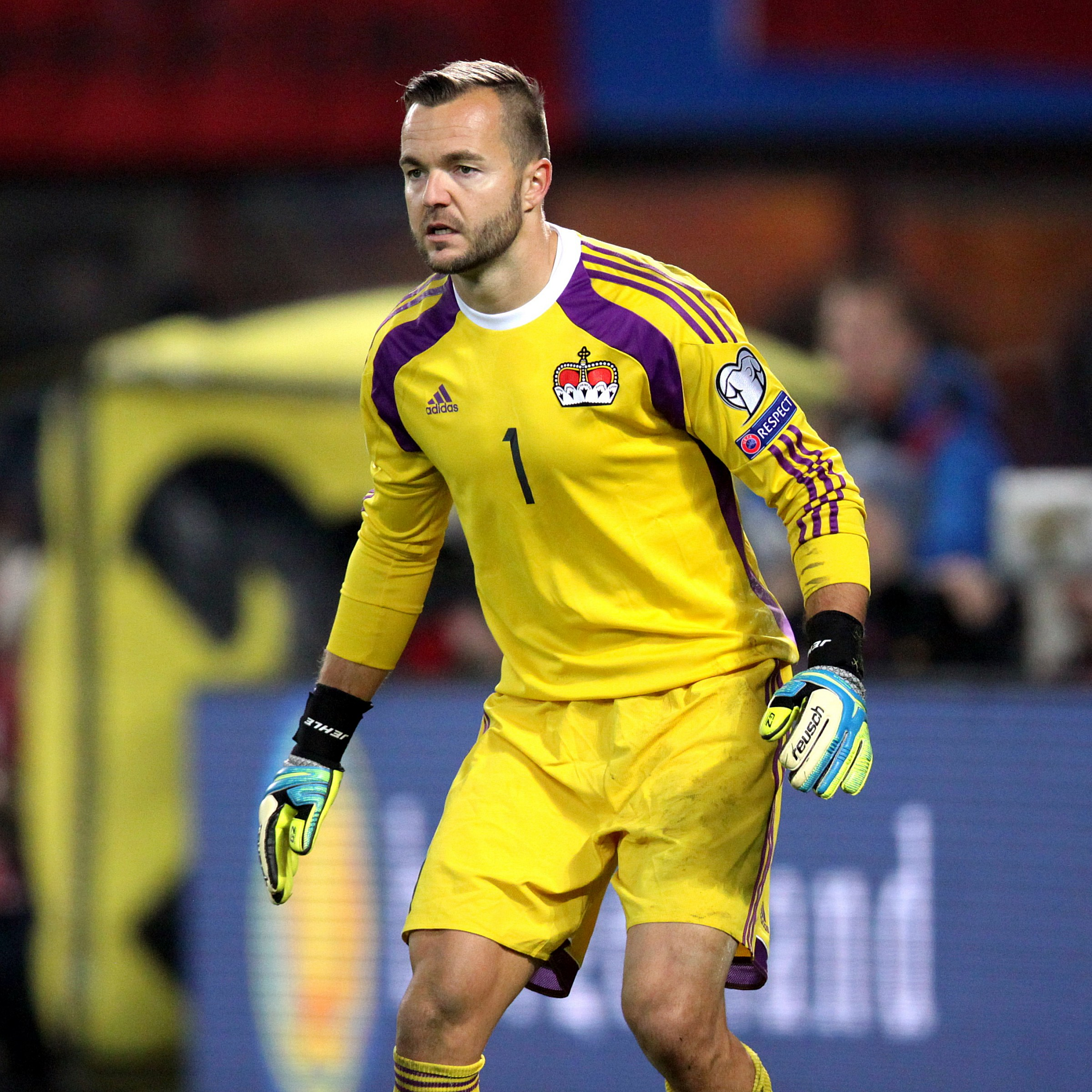
- Jehle in action for Liechtenstein (2015)

Personal information
- Full name: Peter Karl Jehle
- Date of birth: 22 January 1982 (age 44)
- Place of birth: Schaan, Liechtenstein
- Height: 1.87 m (6 ft 2 in)
- Position: Goalkeeper

Youth career
- 1992–1998: Schaan

Senior career*
Years	Team	Apps	(Gls)
1998–2000	Schaan	0	(0)
2000–2006	Grasshoppers	44	(0)
2006–2008	Boavista	24	(0)
2008–2009	Tours	23	(0)
2009–2018	Vaduz	208	(0)
2013	→ Luzern (loan)	2	(0)
Total		301	(0)

International career
1998–2018	Liechtenstein	132	(0)
- * Club domestic league appearances and goals

Peter Karl Jehle (born 22 January 1982) is a Liechtensteiner former professional footballer who played as a goalkeeper.

He spent most of his career with Vaduz, representing the club in both the Swiss Super League and the Challenge League. He also played in France and Portugal.

Over two decades, Jehle won 132 caps for the Liechtenstein national team.

== Club career ==
Jehle was born in Schaan as the youngest of three brothers, all of whom grew up playing football. At the age of 16 he had trials with English Premier League clubs Liverpool and Crystal Palace, and both offered him professional contracts but he turned them down to stay home and finish school. Subsequently, he got further offers from Bayer Leverkusen of the Bundesliga and Juventus of Serie A, but turned those down as well.

Eventually, Jehle signed with Grasshoppers because of its proximity to his hometown. He made his Swiss Super League debut against Basel in August 2000, coming on in the 95th minute to replace first choice Stefan Huber who was sent off for giving away a penalty, and saved the ensuing spot kick taken by Massimo Ceccaroni; he deputised in goal the next game, and kept a clean sheet in a 4–0 win. Towards the end of the season, he again became the starter as Huber was out injured; he appeared in the 4–0 away victory over St. Gallen, the opposition's first home loss in 34 matches and confirmation of his team's championship win.

Jehle moved to Boavista in summer 2006, gaining first-choice status during his second season. In June 2008, following the Porto team's relegation from the Portuguese Primeira Liga due to the Apito Dourado affair, he left and signed a one-year contract with Tours from Ligue 2.

After one season in France, Jehle returned to his country and joined Vaduz in the Swiss Challenge League. On 20 April 2018, the 36-year-old announced his retirement at the end of the campaign, following which he would work with the Liechtenstein Football Association in directorial capacities.

== International career ==
Jehle made his debut for Liechtenstein on 14 October 1998, in a 2–1 win over Azerbaijan for the UEFA Euro 2000 qualifiers which was the country's first ever competitive victory. He was just 16 at the time, but quickly became first choice for the national team and remained in goal the following decade.

On 22 March 2013, with the score at 1–1 against Latvia, the opposition was awarded a penalty. Aleksandrs Cauņa stepped up to convert it but Jehle saved the shot, thus earning the hosts one of just two points during the 2014 FIFA World Cup qualification.

== Honours ==
Grasshoppers

- Swiss Super League: 2000–01, 2002–03

Vaduz

- Swiss Challenge League: 2013–14
- Liechtenstein Football Cup: 2009–10, 2010–11, 2012–13, 2013–14, 2014–15, 2015–16, 2016–17

Individual

- Liechtensteiner Footballer of the Year: 2014, 2016

== See also ==
- List of men's footballers with 100 or more international caps
