= Ruth Ospelt =

Liechtenstein businessman (born 1959)

- Born: 1959
- Occupation: President
- Organization: FC Vaduz; (2013–2019)

Ruth Ospelt (born 1959) is a Liechtenstein businesswoman who was the president of FC Vaduz.

== Life and career ==
Ospelt was born in 1959 in Vaduz, Liechtenstein. She was born to a Catholic father and a Protestant mother. She studied ceramics. She was described as "worked as a nanny in Chicago and as a kiosk salesperson, she has been employed by a TV station and the Vaduz Art Museum, she has worked as a software trainer and telephone operator at a bank". She also worked as a manager for glass production company Swarovski. She quit that job at the age of thirty-five to travel through Central America for a year and learnt the Spanish language. She has been involved in a number of humanitarian initiatives.

In 2003, she applied to become secretary of FC Vaduz. In 2010, she was appointed vice-president of FC Vaduz. In 2013, she was appointed president of FC Vaduz. She became the second female president of a club in the Swiss professional leagues. She helped them achieve promotion in 2014. She suffered relegation in 2017. In 2019, she resigned as president of the club. She was replaced as president by Liechtenstein international Patrick Burgmeier.
