= 2001–02 Liechtenstein Cup =

Tournament details
- Country: Liechtenstein

Final positions
- Champions: FC Vaduz
- Runners-up: USV Eschen/Mauren

The 2001–02 Liechtenstein Cup was the fifty-seventh season of Liechtenstein's annual cup competition. Seven clubs competed with a total of fifteen teams for one spot in the qualifying round of the UEFA Cup. Defending champions were FC Vaduz, who have won the cup continuously since 1998.

== First round ==
Team 1	Score	Team 2
16 October 2001
USV Eschen/Mauren II	0–8	FC Schaan
FC Vaduz II	4–0	FC Ruggell
FC Triesen Español	1–2	FC Triesenberg
FC Triesenberg II	0–6	FC Balzers
17 October 2001
FC Triesen II	0–7	USV Eschen/Mauren
FC Schaan Azzurri	4–2	FC Ruggell II
FC Balzers II	2–1	FC Triesen

== Quarterfinals ==
Team 1	Score	Team 2
6 November 2001
FC Vaduz II	2–3	FC Triesenberg
FC Schaan	0–1	FC Balzers
7 November 2001
FC Schaan Azzurri	2–14	FC Vaduz
FC Balzers II	1–2	USV Eschen/Mauren

== Semifinals ==
Team 1	Score	Team 2
25 April 2002
USV Eschen/Mauren	3–0	FC Balzers
1 May 2002
FC Triesenberg	0–2	FC Vaduz

== Final ==
12 May 2002

FC Vaduz	6–1	USV Eschen/Mauren
Zarn 36', 74'; Merenda 43'; D. Polverino 57', 90'; Silva 90' (pen.)		Atav 20'

Rheinpark Stadion, Vaduz
Attendance: 1,280
Referee: Dietmar Drabek (Austria)
