= Stuckmann =

Stuckmann is a German surname. Notable people with the surname include:

- Chris Stuckmann (born 1988), American film-critic
- Michael Stuckmann (born 1979), German soccer-player
- Thorsten Stuckmann (born 1981), German soccer-player
