= 2006–07 Liechtenstein Cup =

Tournament details
- Country: Liechtenstein

Final positions
- Champions: FC Vaduz
- Runners-up: FC Ruggell

The 2006–07 Liechtenstein Cup was the sixty-second season of Liechtenstein's annual cup competition. Seven clubs competed with a total of sixteen teams for one spot in the first qualifying round of the UEFA Cup. Defending champions were FC Vaduz, who have won the cup continuously since 1998.

== First round ==
| Team 1 | Score | Team 2 |
|---|---|---|
11 August 2006
| FC Schaan III | 0–4 | FC Triesen |
| FC Ruggell II | 1–3 (a.e.t.) | FC Schaan II |
12 August 2006
| USV Eschen/Mauren II | 1–0 | FC Triesenberg |
| FC Triesenberg II | 4–2 | FC Vaduz III |

== Second round ==
| Team 1 | Score | Team 2 |
|---|---|---|
12 September 2006
| FC Triesenberg II | 2–1 | FC Vaduz II |
| FC Triesen | 1–4 | FC Schaan |
13 September 2006
| USV Eschen/Mauren II | 2–2 (a.e.t.) (5–4 p) | FC Balzers II |
| FC Triesen II | 1–2 | FC Schaan II |

== Quarterfinals ==
| Team 1 | Score | Team 2 |
|---|---|---|
17 October 2006
| FC Triesenberg II | 0–1 | USV Eschen/Mauren II |
| FC Schaan II | 2–3 | FC Ruggell |
18 October 2006
| FC Schaan | 0–6 | FC Vaduz |
18 November 2006
| FC Balzers | 2–3 | USV Eschen/Mauren |

== Semifinals ==
| Team 1 | Score | Team 2 |
|---|---|---|
7 April 2007
| USV Eschen/Mauren II | 0–2 | FC Ruggell |
11 April 2007
| FC Vaduz | 3–1 | USV Eschen/Mauren |

== Final ==
1 May 2007

| FC Vaduz | 8–0 | FC Ruggell |
|---|---|---|
| B. Fischer 2'; P. Faye 43', 52'; Oehri 53' (o.g.); Langlet 63', 90+2'; Polverino 67'; Bem 86' |

Rheinpark Stadion, Vaduz
Attendance: 950
Referee: Claudio Bernold (Switzerland)
