= Burgmeier =

Burgmeier is a surname. Notable people with the surname include:

- Franz Burgmeier (born 1982), Liechtensteiner footballer and brother of Patrick Burgmeier
- John Burgmeier (born 1974), American voice actor and script writer
- Patrick Burgmeier (born 1980), Liechtensteiner footballer and brother of Franz Burgmeier
- Tom Burgmeier (born 1943), American former Major League Baseball relief pitcher
