= Patrick Burgmeier =

Liechtenstein footballer

Personal information
- Date of birth: 24 May 1980 (age 46)
- Place of birth: Liechtenstein
- Height: 1.86 m (6 ft 1 in)
- Position: Defender

Senior career*
Years	Team	Apps	(Gls)
1999–2000	USV Eschen/Mauren		
2001–2002	FC Vaduz	5	(0)
2004–2005	FC Triesen		
2005–2009	USV Eschen/Mauren		
2009–2012	FC Schaan		

International career
1999–2004	Liechtenstein	6	(0)

Managerial career
- 2010–: FC Vaduz (Executive director)
- * Club domestic league appearances and goals

Patrick Burgmeier (born 24 May 1980) is a Liechtenstein former footballer who played as a defender.

He played club football for USV Eschen/Mauren, FC Vaduz, FC Triesen, and FC Schaan. He won six caps for Liechtenstein. Burgmeier is the elder brother of fellow footballer Franz Burgmeier, born to Heinz and Elsbeth.

== Honours ==
=== Club ===
Vaduz

- 1. Liga Promotion: 2000–01
- Liechtensteiner Cup: 2000–01
