= Rainer Hasler =

Liechtenstein footballer (1958–2014)

Personal information
- Date of birth: 2 July 1958
- Place of birth: Vaduz, Liechtenstein
- Date of death: c. 29 October 2014 (aged 56)
- Position: Right-back

Senior career*
Years	Team	Apps	(Gls)
1976–1978	Grasshoppers		
1978–1979	FC Vaduz		
1979–1983	Neuchâtel Xamax		
1983–1989	Servette		
- * Club domestic league appearances and goals

Rainer Hasler (2 July 1958 – c. 29 October 2014) was a Liechtenstein footballer who played as a right-back. In November 2003, to celebrate UEFA's jubilee, he was selected by the Liechtenstein Football Association as the country's Golden Player, the greatest player of the last 50 years.

== Club career ==
Hasler played for Grasshoppers, FC Vaduz, Neuchâtel Xamax and Servette FC. With Xamax, he reached the UEFA Cup quarter-final in the 1981–82 season and at Servette, he was captain for two years and won the 1984–85 Swiss championship and the Swiss Cup.

He retired from football in 1989 at 31 years of age.

== International career ==
Hasler never played for Liechtenstein, as the national team barely participated in any games before he retired.

== Death ==
Hasler died c. 29 October 2014 at the age of 56.
