= Hans Trittinger =

Austrian football manager

Personal information
- Full name: Hans Jürgen Trittinger
- Date of birth: 30 July 1947 (age 79)

Managerial career
- Years: Team
- 1986: SCR Altach
- 1986–1987: FC Altstätten
- 1988–1989: FC Altstätten
- 1990–1991: FC Vaduz
- 2003–2005: SCR Altach
- 2005–2006: FC Dornbirn
- 2005–2006: AKA Vorarlberg (youth)
- 2008–2010: SCR Altach (B team)
- 2010–2011: FC Montlingen
- 2012–2014: Dornbirner SV
- 2014–2015: Viktoria Bregenz
- 2015–2017: FC Hörbranz
- 2018: VfB Bezau

Hans Trittinger (born 30 July 1947) is an Austrian football manager.
