= Martin Oehri =

Liechtensteiner footballer

Personal information
- Date of birth: 11 October 1964 (age 62)
- Position: Goalkeeper

Senior career*
Years	Team	Apps	(Gls)
–1990	USV Eschen/Mauren		
1990–1991	Austria Lustenau		
1991–1993	USV Eschen/Mauren		
1993–1994	SV Frastanz		
1994–1995	FC Schruns		
1995–1998	SV Frastanz		
1998–2003	RW Rankweil		
2005–2006	SC St. Gallenkirch		

International career
1993–1998	Liechtenstein	8	(0)
- * Club domestic league appearances and goals

Martin Oehri (born 11 October 1964) is a Liechtensteiner former footballer who is last known to have played as a goalkeeper for SC St. Gallenkirch. He is a former Liechtenstein international.

== Career ==
Oehri is considered to be a Liechtenstein national team legend.

He was former captain of Liechtenstein national team.

Oehri was voted 1992 Liechtensteiner Player of the Year.

He played for RW Rankweil.

He is a former Liechtenstein international.
