= Roland Vrabec =

German football manager (born 1974)

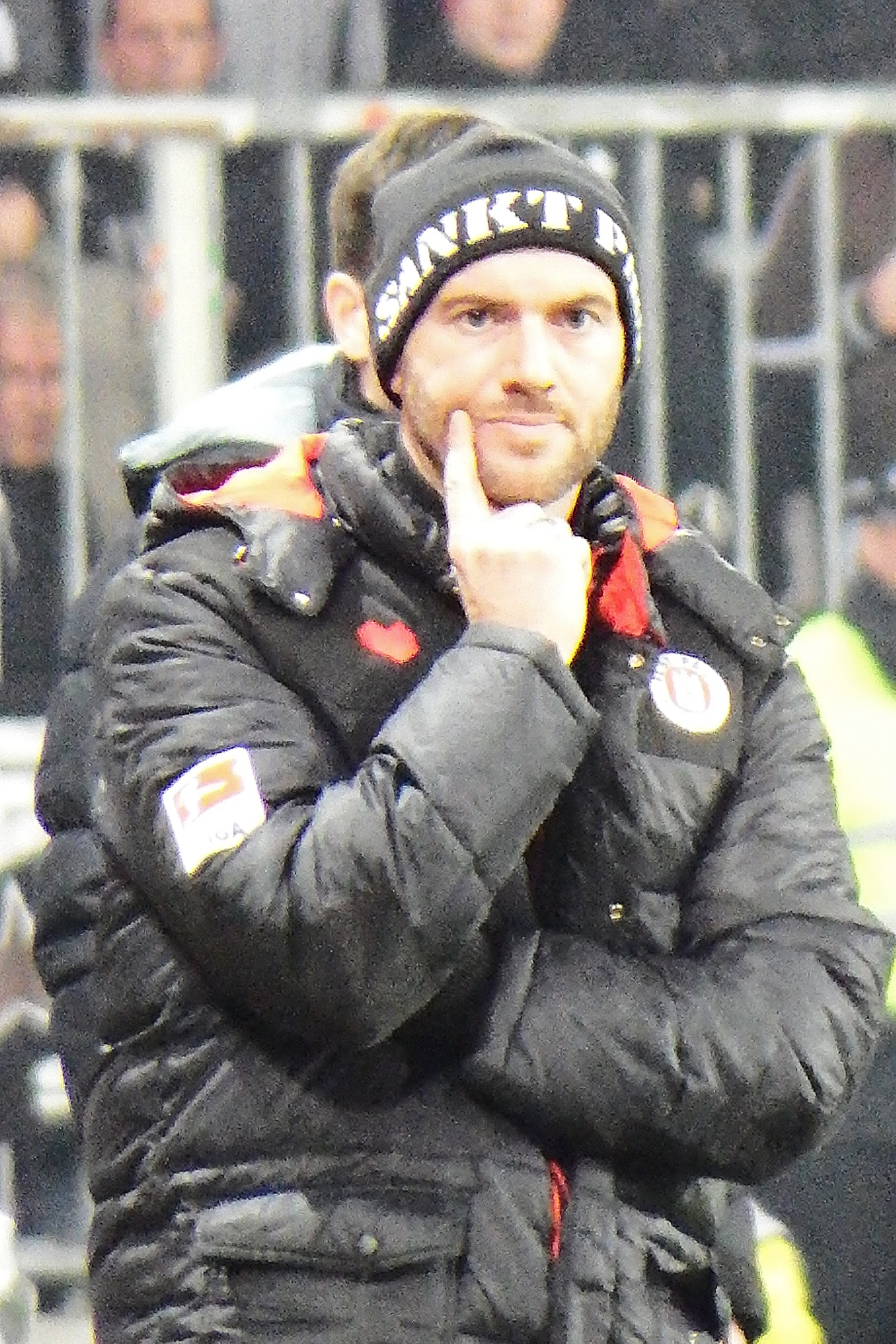
- Vrabec as FC St. Pauli manager in 2013

Personal information
- Date of birth: 6 March 1974 (age 52)
- Place of birth: Frankfurt, West Germany
- Height: 1.79 m (5 ft 10 in)
- Position: Midfielder

Youth career
- 1986–1992: Spvgg 05 Oberrad

Senior career*
Years	Team	Apps	(Gls)
1993–2000	SG Croatia Frankfurt		

Managerial career
- 2000–2007: FSV Frankfurt (youth)
- 2009–2011: Mainz 05 (youth)
- 2011–2012: Germany U18
- 2012–2013: 1. FC Lokomotive Leipzig (assistant)
- 2013: FC St. Pauli (assistant)
- 2013–2014: FC St. Pauli
- 2016–2017: FSV Frankfurt
- 2017–2018: FC Vaduz
- 2019–2020: Progrès Niederkorn
- 2021–2022: Esbjerg fB
- 2023: Greifswalder FC
- 2023–2024: Hesperange
- 2024–2026: FK Panevėžys
- * Club domestic league appearances and goals

Roland Vrabec (born 6 March 1974) is a German football manager. He was most recently the manager of lithuanian Panevėžys Club.

== Career ==
=== Early career ===
He managed FSV Frankfurt youth team and was the head of scout and caretaker for several month of 1. FSV Mainz 05 II. He had various stints as assistant manager in Germany.

=== FC St. Pauli ===
On 21 December 2013, he signed a contract with FC St. Pauli until 2015. He was sacked on 3 September 2014 after poor start in the 2014–15 2. Bundesliga.

=== FSV Frankfurt ===
At the start of the 2016–17 season, he was appointed as the new coach of FSV Frankfurt, but was sacked on 6 March 2017.

=== FC Vaduz ===
Two weeks after the sacking at Frankfurt he was named new manager of FC Vaduz on a contract running until 2018.

=== Progrès Niederkorn ===
He was announced as the new coach of Progrès Niederkorn on 12 June 2019. He was sacked by the club in November 2020.

=== Esbjerg fB ===
On 11 August he was named the successor of Peter Hyballa as manager of the Danish 1st Division club Esbjerg fB. He was sacked in March 2022 with the club only 3 points above the relegation zone.

=== Greifswalder FC ===
In February 2023 he became new manager of Regionalliga Nordost team Greifswalder FC, but in April 2023 he was relieved from his duties.

=== Swift Hesperange ===
In November 2023 he replaced Carlos Fangueiro as manager of FC Swift Hesperange.

=== FK Panevėžys ===
On 16 December 2024 FK Panevėžys announced about new head coach Roland Vrabec.

On 22 March 2026 Roland Vrabec left FK Panevėžys.

== Honours ==
FC Vaduz

- Liechtenstein Football Cup: 2016–17, 2017–18
