= FC Vaduz =

Association football club in Liechtenstein

Vaduz
- Full name: Fussball Club Vaduz
- Short name: FCV
- Founded: 14 February 1932; 94 years ago
- Ground: Rheinpark Stadion; Vaduz, Liechtenstein
- Capacity: 7,584 (5,873 seated)
- Coordinates: 47.1403°N 9.5103°E
- Chairman: Patrick Burgmeier
- Manager: Marc Schneider
- League: Super League
- 2025–26: 1st of 10 (promoted)
- Website: fcvaduz.li
Home colours	Away colours

Vaduz Football Club (German: Fussball Club Vaduz) is a professional football club from Vaduz, Liechtenstein that plays in the Super League, the top tier of Swiss football. The club plays at the national Rheinpark Stadion, which has a capacity of 5,873 when all are seated but has additional standing places in the North and South ends of the ground, giving a total stadium capacity of 7,838.

Vaduz currently play in the Super League following promotion from Challenge League after 2025–26 season. Vaduz represents its own national association in the UEFA Europa Conference League when winning the domestic cup, even though it plays in the Swiss league system. This is due to Liechtenstein not organising its own league. Vaduz is ineligible to represent Switzerland internationally and does not participate in the Swiss Cup due to this arrangement.

Vaduz has historically had many players from Liechtenstein, many of whom have played for the Liechtenstein national team, but nearly all these players have moved abroad, and now the majority of the first team squad are foreign players from different areas of the world. With the club playing in its league system, Swiss players have usually been common in the squad.

On 25 August 2022, after beating Rapid Wien away in Austria, Vaduz made history by qualifying for the Europa Conference League group stage, becoming the first ever club from Liechtenstein to reach the group stages of a UEFA club competition.

== History ==
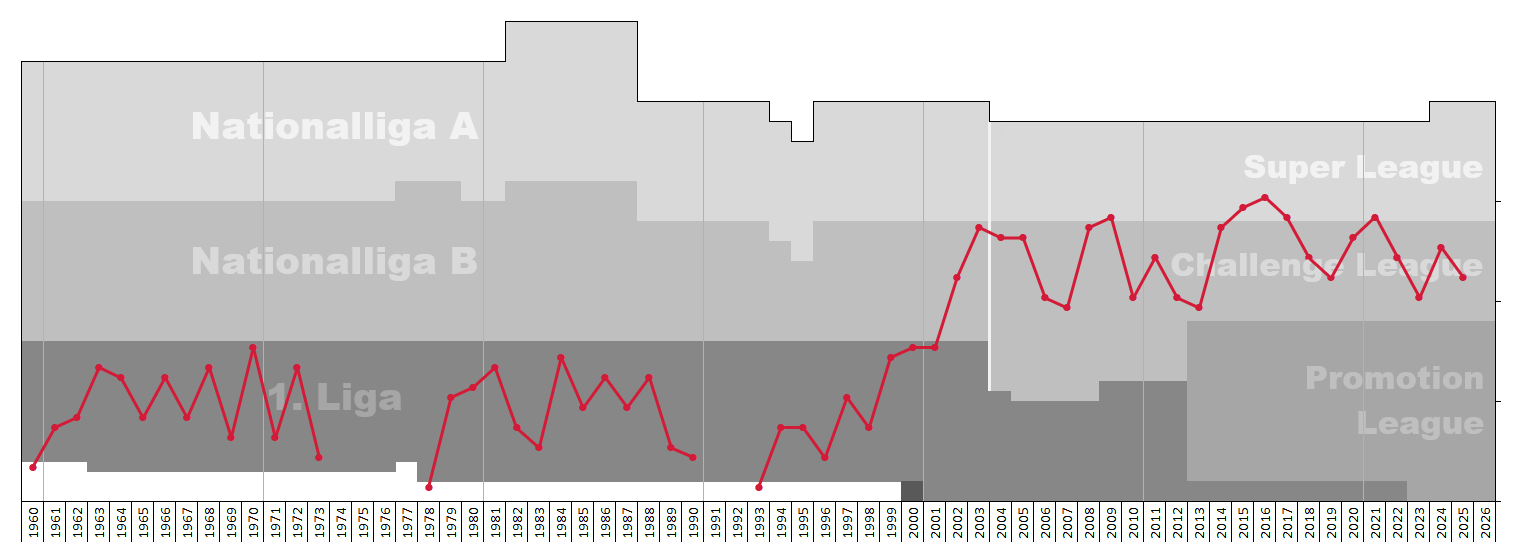
Chart of FC Vaduz table positions in the Swiss football league system

Fussball Club Vaduz was founded on 14 February 1932 in Vaduz, and the club's first chairman was Johann Walser. FC Vaduz is the only professional football club in Liechtenstein. In its first training match, which Vaduz played in Balzers on 24 April of that year, the newly born team emerged as 2–1 winners. The club played in Vorarlberger Football Association in Austria for the 1932–33 season. In 1933, Vaduz began playing in Switzerland. Over the years, Vaduz struggled through various tiers of Swiss football and won its first Liechtensteiner Cup in 1949. Vaduz enjoyed a lengthy stay in the Swiss 1. Liga from 1960 to 1973, then the third tier of the Swiss football league system.

Vaduz has been required to pay a fee to the Swiss Football Association in order to participate as a foreign club, around £150,000 a year. There have been calls for this agreement to be revoked, but discussions have meant that a permanent arrangement has now taken place for a Liechtenstein representative to be allowed to participate in the Challenge League or Super League in the future.

From the 2001–02 season, Vaduz played in the Swiss Challenge League (formerly called Nationalliga B), the second tier of the Swiss league system. Since then, Vaduz has remained one of the best-performing teams in the Challenge League and gave serious challenges towards promotion to the Super League, especially in 2004 and 2005, playing two-leg play-offs in both cases. In the 2007–08 season, Vaduz secured promotion to the Swiss Super League on 12 May 2008 by winning the Challenge League on the season's final day, giving Liechtenstein a representative at the highest level of Swiss football for the first time. Vaduz, however, was relegated back to the Challenge League after one season in the top flight. Vaduz finally returned to the top level after five years in the Challenge League.

In 1992, Vaduz qualified for a UEFA European competition for the first time, entering the UEFA Cup Winners' Cup as Liechtenstein Cup winners, but lost 12–1 on aggregate to Chornomorets Odesa of Ukraine in the qualifying round. In 1996, Vaduz qualified for the first round proper with their first European victory, winning 5–3 on penalties against Universitate Riga of Latvia, after a 2–2 aggregate scoreline, although Vaduz lost their first round tie to Paris Saint-Germain of France 7–0 on aggregate.

After the Cup Winners' Cup was abolished, Vaduz has annually entered the UEFA Cup (now the UEFA Europa League) as a result of winning the Liechtenstein Cup every year since 1998, except in 2012.

Vaduz came within one second of reaching the first round proper of the UEFA Cup in 2002. With the aggregate scores level and opponents Livingston scheduled to go through on away goals, Vaduz won a late corner. The ball was sent into the box, and Marius Zarn hit a goal-bound shot. However, the referee blew the whistle for full-time just before the ball crossed over the line, and Livingston progressed through under controversial circumstances.

For the 2005–06 season, Mats Gren was the coach. In the first round of the 2005–06 UEFA Cup qualifying, Vaduz defeated Moldovan opponent FC Dacia Chişinău. In the second round they faced Turkish club Beşiktaş J.K., who they were eliminated by.

FC Vaduz started their European campaign in 2009–10 by beating Scottish side Falkirk in the second qualifying round of the Europa League. However, they lost 3–0 on aggregate to Czech side Slovan Liberec in the third qualifying round.

In the 2014–15 Swiss Super League season, Vaduz survived in the Swiss Super League for the first time in their history. They finished in 9th place with 31 points won. They also won their 43rd Liechtenstein cup, becoming world record holders of a domestic cup in the process.

In season 2015–16 FC Vaduz started their European campaign in the 2015–16 UEFA Europa League by beating S.P. La Fiorita from San Marino in the first qualifying round of the Europa League. In the second round, Vaduz progressed against Nõmme Kalju FC to progress into the third qualifying round of the Europa League where they were drawn against fellow Swiss Super League club FC Thun. FC Thun won 2–2 on the away goals rule.

Vaduz won their domestic cup for the forty-fourth time and were eighth in the Swiss Super League. They won a team record thirty-six points. Vaduz player Armando Sadiku represented Albania at Euro 2016.

The team appeared for the first time in a popular sports video game, FIFA 17. This was the first time in history that a team from Liechtenstein appeared in the sports video game series.

After three years in the highest tier of Swiss football the 2016–17 season led to Vaduz's relegation, replacing Giorgio Contini with German coach Roland Vrabec after almost 5 years at the helm; Vaduz has not reached the Swiss Super League again.

On 5 September 2018, they terminated their contract with Roland Vrabec. On September 17, they presented Mario Frick as their coach. He is the first coach from Liechtenstein in the club's history.

In season 2019–20 FC Vaduz started their European campaign in the 2019–20 UEFA Europa League by beating Breiðablik from Iceland in the first qualifying round of the Europa League. In the second round, Vaduz caused a shock by knocking out Hungarian side MOL Fehérvár. In the third qualifying round of the Europa League they played against German club Eintracht Frankfurt- the Bundesliga side easily won both matches. However, these matches were historic for Vaduz, as at the first match in Vaduz there were 5,908 spectators present, while the city as a whole has a population of only 5,521.

On 25 August 2022, after an away victory against Rapid Wien, Vaduz secured qualification for the group stages of the Europa Conference League, becoming the first ever team from Liechtenstein to reach the group stages of a European club competition. They were subsequently drawn into Group E where they played against Dutch side AZ, Cypriot champions Apollon Limassol and Ukrainian side Dnipro-1. After a solid start to the group, with a goalless draw at home to Apollon, Vaduz would only go on and collect one more point, away against Dnipro-1, thus finishing bottom of the group with two points from their six games.

On 20 June 2023, Vaduz drew Belarusian side Neman Grodno in the 2023–24 UEFA Europa Conference League first qualifying round.

== Legal status ==
Vaduz is one of several expatriate microstate European football clubs, playing in the Swiss Football League, alongside AS Monaco playing in France, San Marino Calcio playing in Italy and FC Andorra playing in Spain. The difference between Vaduz and the aforementioned clubs is that its status in Switzerland is a "guest club". It is not a member of the Swiss Football Association and as such it does not participate in the Swiss Cup and cannot represent Switzerland in UEFA competitions. If Vaduz finished high enough in the Swiss Super League to qualify for a UEFA competition, it would be excluded and the places would be redistributed among the top Swiss clubs in the league. If it were to win the league, it would not be officially recognized as champions, and the title and trophy would instead go to the second-place club.

Vaduz has an opportunity to qualify for UEFA competition through the Liechtenstein Cup, which places its winner in the UEFA Conference League.

== Stadium ==
=== Rheinpark Stadion ===
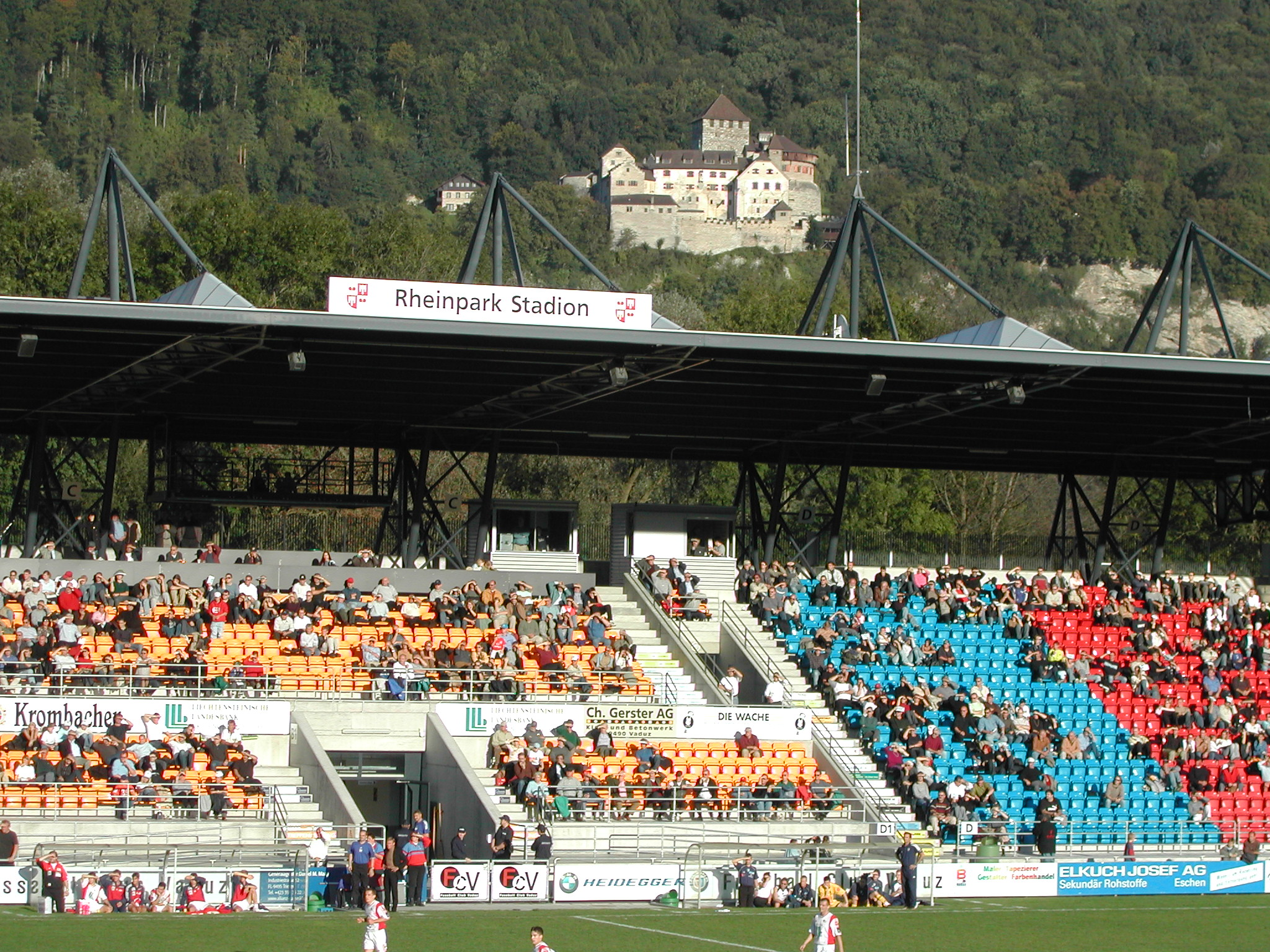
Main stand of the Rheinpark Stadion with Vaduz Castle in the background.

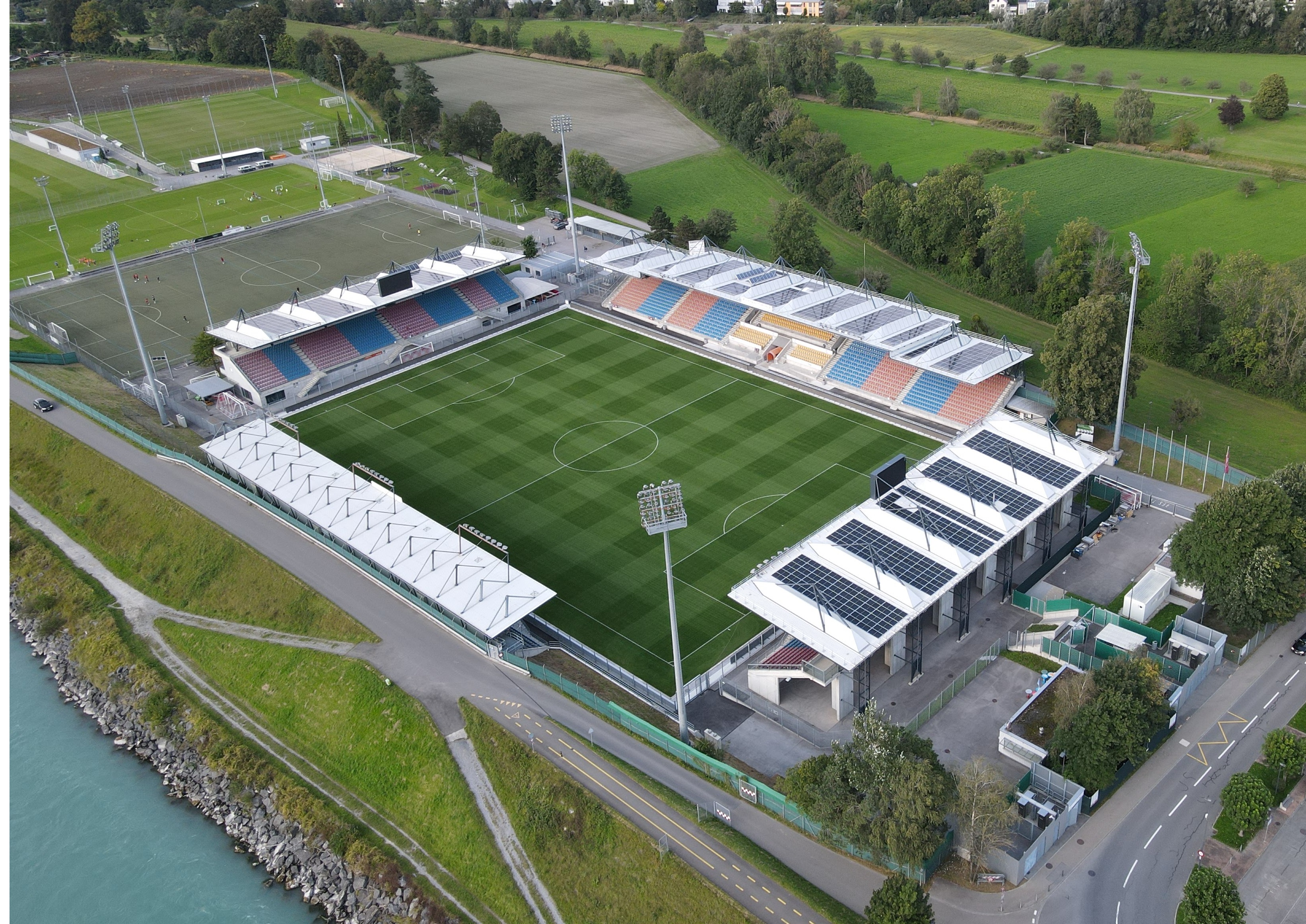
Rheinpark Stadion

The Rheinpark Stadion in Vaduz is the national stadium of Liechtenstein. It plays host to the home matches of the Liechtenstein national football team, and is also the home of Liechtenstein's top football club, FC Vaduz. It lies on the banks of the River Rhine, just metres from the border with Switzerland. The stadium has a fully seated capacity of 5,873, plus additional standing places, giving it a total capacity of 7,584. The building of the stadium cost roughly 19 million CHF.

The stadium was officially opened on 31 July 1998 with a match between FC Vaduz, the Liechtenstein Cup holders at the time, and 1. FC Kaiserslautern, the then Bundesliga champions. Kaiserslautern won the match 8–0. Liverpool F.C. played here against Olympiacos F.C. in a friendly in 2005. Rheinpark Stadion hosted the likes of FC Chornomorets Odesa and Paris Saint-Germain F.C. in this tournament but failed to progress past the qualification rounds.

The construction of the stadium became necessary because the world governing body FIFA and the European association UEFA threatened not to allow more European and international matches in Liechtenstein if the country did not provide a modern venue in accordance with international standards. In Liechtenstein, no domestic football league is played, but a cup competition is organized. Vaduz being by far the most prolific Liechtenstein club is therefore represented in the Conference League almost every year. The national team has only been represented in the qualifying rounds of a major competition.

Rheinpark Stadion sits less than 1 km west of Vaduz city centre on the eastern bank of the Rhein River. Vaduz holds the distinction of being one of the few capitals in the world to lack its own airport and railway station, although there is a train station called Schaan-Vaduz in the nearby town of Schaan.

Rheinpark Stadion consists of four stands: North, East, South and West.

There are a limited number of free parking spaces located at Rheinpark Stadion on matchdays which are allocated on a first-come first-served basis.

== Current sponsorship ==
Companies that FC Vaduz currently has sponsorship deals with include:

- (Liechtenstein) Liechtensteinische Landesbank – main sponsor
- (Liechtenstein) MBPI AG – main sponsor
- (Germany) Puma – kit manufacturer
- (Switzerland) Accurata Treuhand und Revisions AG – official sponsor
- (Switzerland) Brauerei Schützengarten AG – official sponsor
- (Switzerland) Heim Bohrtechnik AG – official sponsor
- (Switzerland) Kibernetik AG – official sponsor
- (Switzerland) Hirslanden Private Hospital Group – medical partner
- (Switzerland) Orthopädie St. Gallen – medical partner

== Crest and colours ==
=== Kit manufacturers and shirt sponsors ===
Period	Kit manufacturer	Shirt sponsor	Ref
2008–19	Adidas	Liechtensteinische Landesbank/MBPI AG	
2019–20	Puma	Liechtensteinische Landesbank/MBPI AG	
2020–22	Puma	Casino Admiral	
2022–23	Puma	MBPI AG	

== Honours ==
=== Domestic competitions ===
- Liechtenstein Football Championship
  - Winners (2): 1932, 1936
- Liechtenstein Football Cup
  - Winners (52): 1948–49, 1951–52, 1952–53, 1953–54, 1955–56, 1956–57, 1957–58, 1958–59, 1959–60, 1960–61, 1962, 1965–66, 1966–67, 1967–68, 1968–69, 1969–70, 1970–71, 1973–74, 1979–80, 1984–85, 1986, 1987–88, 1989–90, 1991–92, 1994–95, 1995–96, 1997–98, 1998–99, 1999–2000, 2000–01, 2001–02, 2002–03, 2003–04, 2004–05, 2005–06, 2006–07, 2007–08, 2008–09, 2009–10, 2010–11, 2012–13, 2013–14, 2014–15, 2015–16, 2016–17, 2017–18, 2018–19, 2021–22, 2022–23, 2023–24, 2024–25, 2025–26
  - Runners-up (13): 1945–46, 1946–47, 1947–48, 1949–50, 1950–51, 1954–55, 1971–72, 1976–77, 1983–84, 1986–87, 1990–91, 1996–97, 2011–12

=== Switzerland competitions ===
- (Switzerland) Swiss Challenge League (2nd tier)
  - Winners (4): 2002–03, 2007–08, 2013–14, 2025–26
  - Runners-up (3): 2003–04, 2004–05, 2019–20
- (Switzerland) 1. Liga Classic (3rd tier)
  - Winners (2): 1999–2000, 2000–01

== European record ==
Competition	Matches	W	D	L	GF	GA	±
UEFA Cup Winners' Cup	10	0	2	8	4	40	−36
UEFA Cup / UEFA Europa League	67	21	14	32	76	93	−17
UEFA Europa Conference League / UEFA Conference League	26	6	8	12	33	38	−5
Total	103	27	24	52	113	171	−58

=== Matches ===
Season	Competition	Round	Opponent	Home	Away	Aggregate
1992–93	European Cup Winners' Cup	Qualifying round	(Ukraine) Chornomorets Odesa	0–5	1–7	1–12
1995–96	UEFA Cup Winners' Cup	Qualifying round	(Czechoslovakia) Hradec Králové	0–5	1–9	1–14
1996–97	UEFA Cup Winners' Cup	Qualifying round	(Latvia) Universitāte Rīga	1–1	1–1	2–2 (4–2 p)
1996–97	UEFA Cup Winners' Cup	First round	(France) Paris Saint-Germain	0–4	0–3	0–7
1998–99	UEFA Cup Winners' Cup	Qualifying round	(Sweden) Helsingborg	0–2	0–3	0–5
1999–2000	UEFA Cup	Qualifying round	(Norway) Bodø/Glimt	0–1	1–2	1–3
2000–01	UEFA Cup	Qualifying round	(Poland) Amica Wronki	0–3	3–3	3–6
2001–02	UEFA Cup	Qualifying round	(Croatia) Varteks	3–3	1–6	4–9
2002–03	UEFA Cup	Qualifying round	(Scotland) Livingston	1–1	0–0	1–1 (a)
2003–04	UEFA Cup	Qualifying round	(Ukraine) Dnipro Dnipropetrovsk	0–1	0–1	0–2
2004–05	UEFA Cup	First qualifying round	(Republic of Ireland) Longford Town	1–0	3–2	4–2
2004–05	UEFA Cup	Second qualifying round	(Belgium) Beveren	1–3	1–2	2–5
2005–06	UEFA Cup	First qualifying round	(Moldova) Dacia Chișinău	2–0	0–1	2–1
2005–06	UEFA Cup	Second qualifying round	(Turkey) Beşiktaş	0–1	1–5	1–6
2006–07	UEFA Cup	First qualifying round	(Hungary) Újpest	0–1	4–0	4–1
2006–07	UEFA Cup	Second qualifying round	(Switzerland) Basel	2–1	0–1	2–2 (a)
2007–08	UEFA Cup	First qualifying round	(Georgia (country)) Dinamo Tbilisi	0–0	0–2	0–2
2008–09	UEFA Cup	First qualifying round	(Bosnia and Herzegovina) Zrinjski Mostar	1–2	0–3	1–5
2009–10	UEFA Europa League	Second qualifying round	(Scotland) Falkirk	2–0 (aet)	0–1	2–1
2009–10	UEFA Europa League	Third qualifying round	(Czech Republic) Slovan Liberec	0–1	0–2	0–3
2010–11	UEFA Europa League	Second qualifying round	(Denmark) Brøndby	0–0	0–3	0–3
2011–12	UEFA Europa League	Second qualifying round	(Serbia) Vojvodina	0–2	3–1	3–3 (a)
2011–12	UEFA Europa League	Third qualifying round	(Israel) Hapoel Tel Aviv	2–1	0–4	2–5
2013–14	UEFA Europa League	First qualifying round	(Georgia (country)) Chikhura Sachkhere	1–1	0–0	1–1 (a)
2014–15	UEFA Europa League	First qualifying round	(Gibraltar) College Europa	3–0	1–0	4–0
2014–15	UEFA Europa League	Second qualifying round	(Poland) Ruch Chorzów	0–0	2–3	2–3
2015–16	UEFA Europa League	First qualifying round	(San Marino) La Fiorita	5–1	5–0	10–1
2015–16	UEFA Europa League	Second qualifying round	(Estonia) Nõmme Kalju	3–1	2–0	5–1
2015–16	UEFA Europa League	Third qualifying round	(Switzerland) Thun	2–2	0–0	2–2 (a)
2016–17	UEFA Europa League	First qualifying round	(North Macedonia) Sileks	3–1	2–1	5–2
2016–17	UEFA Europa League	Second qualifying round	(Denmark) Midtjylland	2–2	0–3	2–5
2017–18	UEFA Europa League	First qualifying round	(Wales) Bala Town	3–0	2–1	5–1
2017–18	UEFA Europa League	Second qualifying round	(Norway) Odds BK	0–1	0–1	0–2
2018–19	UEFA Europa League	First qualifying round	(Bulgaria) Levski Sofia	1–0	2–3	3–3 (a)
2018–19	UEFA Europa League	Second qualifying round	(Lithuania) Žalgiris	1–1	0–1	1–2
2019–20	UEFA Europa League	First qualifying round	(Iceland) Breiðablik	2–1	0–0	2–1
2019–20	UEFA Europa League	Second qualifying round	(Hungary) MOL Fehérvár	2–0 (aet)	0–1	2–1
2019–20	UEFA Europa League	Third qualifying round	(Germany) Eintracht Frankfurt	0–5	0–1	0–6
2020–21	UEFA Europa League	First qualifying round	(Malta) Hibernians	0–2	—N/a	—N/a
2021–22	UEFA Europa Conference League	Second qualifying round	(Hungary) Újpest	1–3	1–2	2–5
2022–23	UEFA Europa Conference League	Second qualifying round	(Slovenia) Koper	1–1 (a.e.t.)	1–0	2–1
2022–23	UEFA Europa Conference League	Third qualifying round	(Turkey) Konyaspor	1–1	4–2	5–3
2022–23	UEFA Europa Conference League	Play-off round	(Austria) Rapid Wien	1–1	1–0	2–1
2022–23	UEFA Europa Conference League	Group E	(Netherlands) AZ	1–2	1–4	4th
2022–23	UEFA Europa Conference League	Group E	(Cyprus) Apollon Limassol	0–0	0–1	4th
2022–23	UEFA Europa Conference League	Group E	(Ukraine) Dnipro-1	1–2	2–2	4th
2023–24	UEFA Europa Conference League	First qualifying round	(Belarus) Neman Grodno	1–2	1–1	2–3
2024–25	UEFA Conference League	Second qualifying round	(Republic of Ireland) St Patrick's Athletic	2–2	1–3	3–5
2025–26	UEFA Conference League	Second qualifying round	(Northern Ireland) Dungannon Swifts	0–1	3–0 (a.e.t.)	3–1
2025–26	UEFA Conference League	Third qualifying round	(Netherlands) AZ	0–1	0–3	0–4
2026–27	UEFA Conference League	Second qualifying round	(Andorra) Atlètic d'Escaldes	4–0	2–0	6–0
2026–27	UEFA Conference League	Third qualifying round	(Finland) Inter Turku	2–2	1–2	3–4

Biggest wins in UEFA competition:

Competition	Match	Score
2006–07 UEFA Cup	(Hungary) Újpest – (Liechtenstein) FC Vaduz	0–4
2014–15 UEFA Europa League	(Liechtenstein) FC Vaduz – (Gibraltar) Europa	3–0
2015–16 UEFA Europa League	(San Marino) La Fiorita – (Liechtenstein) FC Vaduz	0–5
2015–16 UEFA Europa League	(Liechtenstein) FC Vaduz – (San Marino) La Fiorita	5–1
2017–18 UEFA Europa League	(Liechtenstein) FC Vaduz – (Wales) Bala Town	3–0
2025–26 UEFA Conference League	(Northern Ireland) Dungannon Swifts – (Liechtenstein) FC Vaduz	0–3 (a.e.t.)
2026–27 UEFA Conference League	(Liechtenstein) FC Vaduz – (Andorra) Atlètic d'Escaldes	4–0

Biggest losses in UEFA competition:

Competition	Match	Score
1992–93 European Cup Winners' Cup	(Liechtenstein) FC Vaduz – (Ukraine) Chornomorets Odesa	0–5
1992–93 European Cup Winners' Cup	(Ukraine) Chornomorets Odesa – (Liechtenstein) FC Vaduz	7–1
1995–96 UEFA Cup Winners' Cup	(Liechtenstein) FC Vaduz – (Czech Republic) Hradec Králové	0–5
1995–96 UEFA Cup Winners' Cup	(Czech Republic) Hradec Králové – (Liechtenstein) FC Vaduz	9–1
2001–02 UEFA Cup	(Croatia) Varteks – (Liechtenstein) FC Vaduz	6–1
2019–20 UEFA Europa League	(Liechtenstein) FC Vaduz – (Germany) Eintracht Frankfurt	0–5

== Club records ==
- Biggest European home win: FC Vaduz 5–1 (San Marino) La Fiorita (09.07.2015, UEFA Europa League First qualifying round second leg)
- Biggest European away win: (San Marino) La Fiorita 0–5 FC Vaduz (02.07.2015, UEFA Europa League First qualifying round first leg)
- Biggest European home defeat: FC Vaduz 0–5 (Ukraine) Chornomorets Odesa (19.08.1992, European Cup Winners' Cup), FC Vaduz 0–5 (Czech Republic) Hradec Králové (10.08.1995, European Cup Winners' Cup), FC Vaduz 0–5 (Germany) Eintracht Frankfurt (08.08.2019, Europa League)
- Biggest European away defeat: (Czech Republic) Hradec Králové 9–1 FC Vaduz (24.08.1995, European Cup Winners' Cup)
- Biggest home win: FC Vaduz 11–0 (Liechtenstein) FC Schaan (04.05.2016, FL–Cup Final)
- Biggest away win: (Liechtenstein) FC Triesen II 0–22 FC Vaduz (09.11.1999, FL–Cup Quarter-Finals)
- Player with most trophies with FC Vaduz: (Liechtenstein) Franz Burgmeier (16)
- Player with most appearances: (Liechtenstein) Franz Burgmeier (371)
- Player with most goals: (Liechtenstein) Daniele Polverino (91)
- Player with most UEFA appearances: (Liechtenstein) Daniel Hasler, (Liechtenstein) Peter Jehle, (Liechtenstein) Franz Burgmeier (22)
- Player with most Super League appearances: (Switzerland) Philipp Muntwiler (90)
- Most European goals: (Switzerland) Moreno Costanzo, (Switzerland) Moreno Merenda (5)
- Most Super League goals: (Switzerland) Moreno Costanzo (12)
- Most goals in Liechtenstein Cup: Daniele Polverino (76)
- Highest home game attendance: 6,773 (against (Switzerland) FC Basel, (Switzerland) FC St. Gallen)
- Highest away game attendance (St. Jakob-Park): 27,066 (against (Switzerland) FC Basel)
- Highest European home game attendance: 5,908 (against (Germany) Eintracht Frankfurt)
- Highest European away game attendance (Waldstadion): 48,000 (against (Germany) Eintracht Frankfurt)
- Most capped foreign player: Miguel Mea Vitali, 87 caps, Venezuela
- Most capped Liechtenstein player: Peter Jehle, 132 caps (National Record)

=== Individual awards ===
==== Domestic ====
The player of the year in Liechtenstein has been announced as the season 1980/81 to 2007/08 as of the end of the season. The open for all election was organized by media house Vaduz. Since 2009, the Liechtenstein Football Association draws the title holder of its own. To this end, the LFV-Award has been launched, annually awarded a title in which professional bodies and public in three categories. The categories are Footballer of the Year, Young Player of the Year and Coach of the Year.

Liechtensteiner Footballer of the Year

Year	Name
1980–81	(Liechtenstein) Branko Eškinja
1982–83	(Liechtenstein) Branko Eškinja
1984–85	(Liechtenstein) Roland Moser
1985–86	(Liechtenstein) Roland Moser
1986–87	(Liechtenstein) Harry Schädler
1991–92	(Liechtenstein) Martin Oehri
1995–96	(Liechtenstein) Harry Zech
1996–97	(Liechtenstein) Daniel Hasler
1997–98	(Liechtenstein) Martin Stocklasa
2003–04	(Liechtenstein) Benjamin Fischer
2007–08	(Brazil) Gaspar Odirlei
2014	(Liechtenstein) Peter Jehle
2015	(Liechtenstein) Nicolas Hasler
2016	(Liechtenstein) Peter Jehle
2017	(Liechtenstein) Nicolas Hasler
2022	(Liechtenstein) Benjamin Büchel
2023	(Liechtenstein) Benjamin Büchel
2024	(Liechtenstein) Benjamin Büchel
2025	(Liechtenstein) Nicolas Hasler

Liechtensteiner Young Player of the Year

Year	Name
2010	(Liechtenstein) David Hasler
2011	(Liechtenstein) Nicolas Hasler
2012	(Liechtenstein) Nicolas Hasler

Special prize LFV Award

Year	Name
2017	(Liechtenstein) Maximilian Göppel

Liechtensteiner Coach of the Year

Year	Name
2010	(Netherlands) Eric Orie
2014	(Switzerland) Giorgio Contini
2016	(Switzerland) Giorgio Contini
2022	(Liechtenstein) Mario Frick

==== Switzerland ====
Swiss Challenge League top scorers

Season	Name	Goals
2008	(Brazil) Gaspar Odirlei	31
2010	(Germany) Nick Proschwitz	23

Swiss Challenge League dream team

Season	Name
2013	(Germany) Markus Neumayr
2013	(Switzerland) Nick von Niederhäusern
2013	(Liechtenstein) Peter Jehle
2018	(Switzerland) Philipp Muntwiler

==== International ====
To celebrate the Union of European Football Associations (UEFA)'s 50th anniversary in 2004, each of its member associations was asked by UEFA to choose one of its own players as the single most outstanding player of the past 50 years (1954–2003).

Golden Player

Year	Name
2004	(Liechtenstein) Rainer Hasler

=== Team awards ===
Fairplay Trophy

Season	League	Points
2013–14	(Switzerland) Swiss Challenge League	65
2022–23	(Switzerland) Swiss Challenge League	90

== UEFA ranking ==
As of 20 March 2023

Rank	Team	Points	Country
158	(Slovenia) Olimpija Ljubljana	9.000	2.500
159	(Northern Ireland) Linfield	8.500	1.716
160	(Liechtenstein) Vaduz	8.500	2.200
161	(Bosnia and Herzegovina) Zrinjski	8.500	1.950
162	(Slovakia) Dunajská Streda	8.500	3.950

== Swiss Super League history ==
In the 2007–08 season, for the first time in their history, FC Vaduz earned promotion to Swiss Super League. Two times before they failed to be promoted in playoffs in the season 2003–04 against Neuchâtel Xamax and 2004–05 against FC Schaffhausen. In the 2015–16 season they finished on the 8th place in front of FC Lugano and FC Zürich who were that season relegated to the Swiss Challenge League. After two seasons FC Vaduz was also relegated. In the 2019–20 season Vaduz finished in second place and played in the playoffs against FC Thun and Vaduz were promoted to the Super League for the third time, but in 2020–21 finished last and were automatically relegated. In 2025–26 season Vaduz finished in first place and were promoted to the Super League for the fourth time as champions.

Season	Pos	Pld	W	D	L	GF	GA	Pts	Att.
2008–09	10	36	5	7	24	28	85	22	2,177
2014–15	9	36	7	10	19	28	59	31	4,152
2015–16	8	36	7	15	14	44	60	36	4,006
2016–17	10	36	7	9	20	45	78	30	4,086
2020–21	10	36	9	9	18	36	58	36	227
2026–27	TBD								
Total		180	35	50	95	181	340	155	2,930

== Current squad ==
As of 4 August 2026

Note: Flags indicate national team as defined under FIFA eligibility rules; some limited exceptions apply. Players may hold more than one non-FIFA nationality.

No.	Pos.	Nation	Player
1	GK	LIE	Benjamin Büchel
4	MF	LIE	Nicolas Hasler (Captain)
5	DF	SUI	Liridon Berisha
6	DF	ALB	Denis Simani
7	MF	SUI	Dominik Schwizer
8	MF	SUI	Stephan Seiler
9	FW	AUT	Marcel Monsberger
10	MF	URU	Juan Ignacio Cabrera
11	MF	KOS	Lutfi Dalipi (on loan from Young Boys)
14	DF	SUI	Mischa Beeli
16	FW	SUI	Ranjan Neelakandan (on loan from Annecy)
17	MF	GER	Julian Stark
18	FW	GER	Daniel Kasper
19	FW	SRB	Dejan Djokic

No.	Pos.	Nation	Player
20	MF	GER	Luca Mack
21	GK	LIE	Tim-Tiado Oehri
22	MF	SUI	Mischa Eberhard
23	MF	SUI	Mats Hammerich
24	FW	MDA	Lado Akhalaia
25	GK	GER	Leon Schaffran
27	DF	GER	Niklas Lang
28	MF	SRB	Miloš Ćoćić
29	DF	SUI	Malik Sawadogo
30	MF	SUI	Mattia Walker (on loan from Luzern)
37	DF	SUI	Luca Celentano
38	GK	SUI	Nico Föllmi
39	FW	CRO	Dejan Sorgić

== Technical staff ==
Current technical staff
- Manager: (Switzerland) Marc Schneider
- Assistant coach: (Switzerland) Pascal Cerrone
- Goalkeeping coach: (Germany) Sebastian Selke
- Fitness coach: (Switzerland) Fabio Scali
- Doctor: (Austria) Dr. Alexander Gohm
- Medical department: (Liechtenstein) Matthias Sturn
- Medical department: (Liechtenstein) Manuel Nef
- Kit manager: (Liechtenstein) David Montinari
- Director of football: (Liechtenstein) Franz Burgmeier
- Executive director: (Liechtenstein) Patrick Burgmeier

Management
- President: (Liechtenstein) Patrick Burgmeier
- Board member: (Liechtenstein) Öezkan Gülbahar
- Board member: (Liechtenstein) Gabriel Meier
- Board member: (Liechtenstein) Lorenz Gassner
- Board member: (Liechtenstein) Christopher Holder
- Board member: (Liechtenstein) Benjamin Fischer
- Finance director: (Liechtenstein) Brigitte Löscher
- Chief marketing officer: (Liechtenstein) Noah Gross
- Secretary: (Liechtenstein) Carmen Alabor
- Announcer: (Liechtenstein) Maximilian Vogt

== FC Vaduz U23 ==
FC Vaduz U23 is the reserve team of FC Vaduz. They currently play in the 2. Liga (sixth tier of the Swiss football league system). In the season 2014–15 they played semi-finals in Liechtenstein Cup against FC Triesenberg and they lost 1–0 after extra time.

=== Current squad ===
Note: Flags indicate national team as defined under FIFA eligibility rules; some limited exceptions apply. Players may hold more than one non-FIFA nationality.

No.	Pos.	Nation	Player
1	GK	LIE	Silvan Schädler
2	DF	LIE	David Jäger
3	DF	LIE	Johannes Schädler
4	DF	NED	Enrique van der Lubbe
5	DF	GER	Oliver Neumann
6	MF	SUI	Luka Krbanjevic
7	MF	LIE	Kenny Kindle
8	DF	LIE	Severin Schlegel
9	FW	AUT	Nico Helbock
10	MF	LIE	Alessio Hasler
11	DF	LIE	Luca Beck

No.	Pos.	Nation	Player
15	MF	KOS	Lorent Zymeri
16	FW	ITA	Vincenzo Collodoro
17	MF	SUI	Fabian Inhelder
18	MF	SUI	Thierry Magnin
19	MF	LIE	Francesco Sestito (on loan from FC Balzers)
20	FW	LIE	Rafael Blumenthal
21	FW	LIE	Louis Linsmaier
22	MF	GER	Wodan Munding
23	MF	SUI	Nico Broder
25	GK	LIE	Lorin Beck
27	FW	LIE	Fabio Luque-Notaro

=== Technical staff ===
Current technical staff
- Manager: (Switzerland) Daniel Sereinig
- Assistant coach: (Liechtenstein) Fabio Kindle

== Recent seasons ==
Recent season-by-season performance of the club:

Season	Tier	Division	P	W	D	L	GF	GA	PTS	Position	Cup	Europe	Notes
2001–02	II	Challenge League	-	-	-	-	-	-	-	11th	WINNERS	UEFA Cup - QR	
2002–03	II	Challenge League	-	-	-	-	-	-	-	1st	WINNERS	UEFA Cup - QR	
2003–04	II	Challenge League	32	16	9	7	56	34	57	2nd	WINNERS	UEFA Cup - QR	
2004–05	II	Challenge League	34	21	6	7	58	28	69	2nd	WINNERS	UEFA Cup - QR2	
2005–06	II	Challenge League	34	13	7	14	57	54	46	8th	WINNERS	UEFA Cup - QR2	
2006–07	II	Challenge League	34	12	10	12	57	52	46	9th	WINNERS	UEFA Cup - QR2	
2007–08	II	Challenge League	34	21	7	6	75	40	70	1st ↑	WINNERS	UEFA Cup - QR1	
2008–09	I	Super League	36	5	7	24	28	85	22	10th ↓	WINNERS	UEFA Cup - QR1	
2009–10	II	Challenge League	30	11	8	11	44	43	41	8th	WINNERS	UEFA Europa League - QR3	
2010–11	II	Challenge League	30	19	3	8	59	41	60	4th	WINNERS	UEFA Europa League - QR2	
2011–12	II	Challenge League	30	13	6	11	54	45	45	8th	Runners-up	UEFA Europa League - QR3	
2012–13	II	Challenge League	36	10	7	19	41	52	37	8th	WINNERS	did not qualify	
2013–14	II	Challenge League	36	21	10	5	71	34	73	1st ↑	WINNERS	UEFA Europa League - QR1	
2014–15	I	Super League	36	7	10	19	28	59	31	9th	WINNERS	UEFA Europa League - QR2	
2015–16	I	Super League	36	7	15	14	44	60	36	8th	WINNERS	UEFA Europa League - QR3	
2016–17	I	Super League	36	7	9	20	45	78	30	10th ↓	WINNERS	UEFA Europa League - QR2	
2017–18	II	Challenge League	36	16	11	9	66	50	59	4th	WINNERS	UEFA Europa League - QR2	
2018–19	II	Challenge League	36	11	9	16	48	70	42	6th	WINNERS	UEFA Europa League - QR2	
2019–20	II	Challenge League	36	18	10	8	78	53	64	2nd ↑	cancelled	UEFA Europa League - QR3	won the promotion play-offs
2020–21	I	Super League	36	9	9	18	36	58	36	10th ↓	cancelled	UEFA Europa League - QR1	
2021–22	II	Challenge League	36	18	6	12	68	58	60	4th	WINNERS	UEFA Conference League - QR2	
2022–23	II	Challenge League	36	7	16	13	54	56	37	8th	WINNERS	UEFA Conference League - GS	
2023–24	II	Challenge League	36	13	10	13	67	55	49	3rd	WINNERS	UEFA Conference League - QR1	
2024–25	II	Challenge League	36	13	12	11	48	49	51	6th	WINNERS	UEFA Conference League - QR2	

Key

P - games played; W- wins; D- draws; L- losses; GF- goals for; GA - goals against; PTS - points

QR - Qualifying Round; QR1 - Qualifying Round 1; QR2 - Qualifying Round 2; QR3 - Qualifying Round 3

↑ Promoted	↓ Relegated

== Former players ==
A few former players are considered by the fans to be especially memorable because of their long and outstanding contributions towards the club, to some degree even decades after the end of their careers. Therefore, they have a very special status with the fans. The following are a few examples:

- Armando Sadiku (Albania) (player 2016)
- Jodel Dossou (Benin) (player 2018–2019)
- Odirlei de Souza Gaspar (Brazil) (player 2005–2009)
- Stjepan Kukuruzović (Croatia) (player 2015–2017)
- Markus Neumayr (Germany) (player 2013–2015)
- Nick Proschwitz (Germany) (player 2010–2011)
- Pak Kwang-ryong (North Korea) (player 2013–2015)
- Hekuran Kryeziu (Kosovo) (player 2014–2015)
- Nicolas Hasler (Liechtenstein) (player 2011–2017)
- Martin Stocklasa (Liechtenstein) (player 1997–1999, 2002–2006)
- Rainer Hasler (Liechtenstein) (player 1978–1979)
- Pape Omar Faye (Senegal) (player 2006–2007)
- Dušan Cvetinović (Serbia) (player 2011–2013)
- Goran Obradović (Serbia and Montenegro) (player 2005)
- Pascal Schürpf (Switzerland) (player 2013–2017)
- Simone Grippo (Switzerland) (player 2013–2017)
- Moreno Merenda (Switzerland) (player 2001–2002, 2010–2012)
- Yann Sommer (Switzerland) (player 2007–2009)
- Fakhreddine Galbi (Tunisia) (player 2008–2009)
- Marko Dević (Ukraine) (player 2017–2018)
- Caleb Stanko (United States) (player 2016–2017)

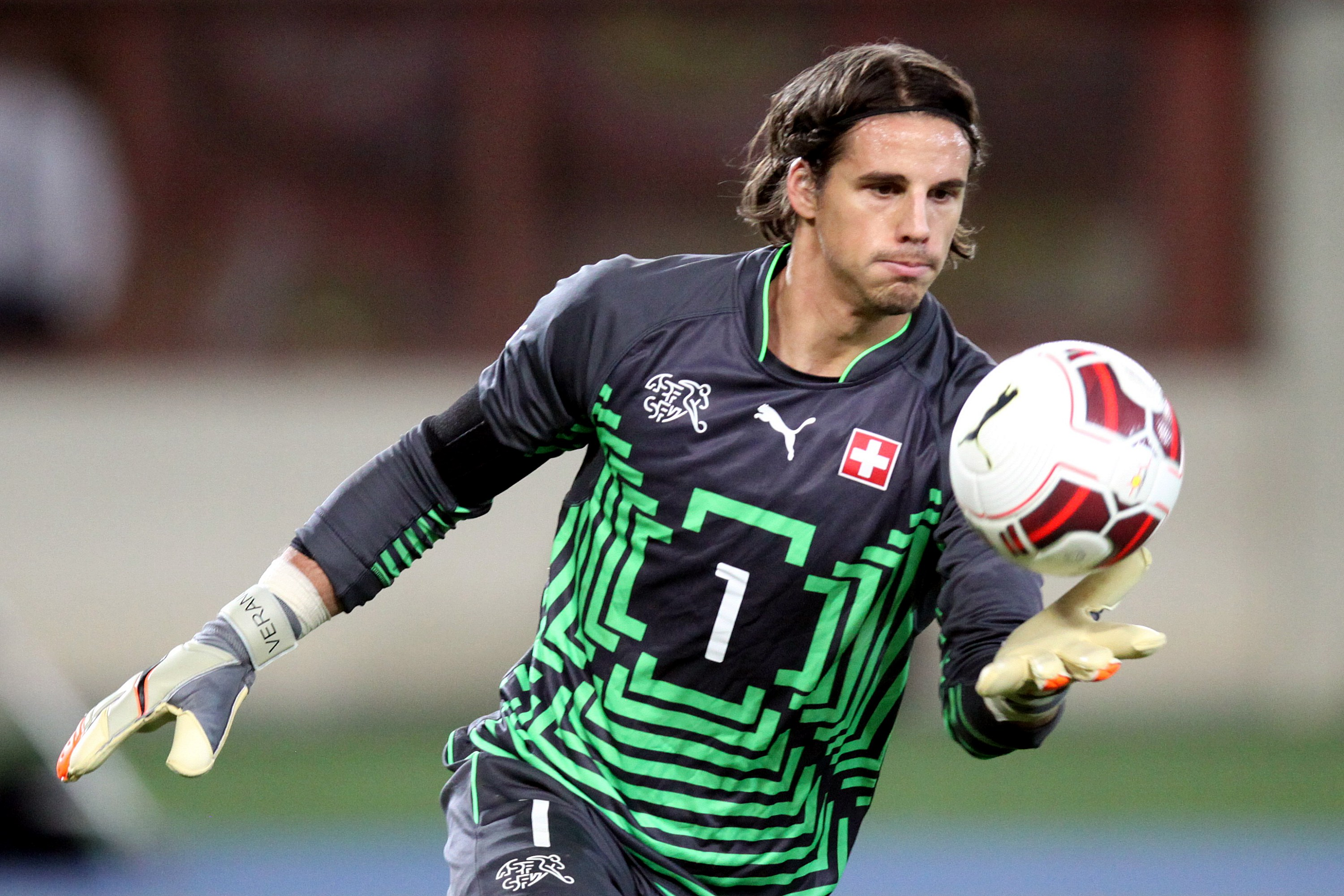
Yann Sommer in the Switzerland national football team

Players of Vaduz at major international tournaments

Tournament	
(Australia) AFC Asian Cup 2015	(North Korea) Pak Kwang-Ryong
(France) UEFA Euro 2016	(Albania) Armando Sadiku
(France) UEFA Euro 2016	(Albania) Naser Aliji
(Egypt) Africa Cup of Nations 2019	(Benin) Jodel Dossou

== Former managers ==
- (Germany) Otto Pfister (1961–63)
- (Kingdom of Hungary (1920–1946)) Tibor Lőrincz (1969–71)
- (Socialist Federal Republic of Yugoslavia) Željko Perušić (1974–75)
- (Germany) Peter Blusch (1980–82)
- (Germany) Hans Krostina (1983–85)
- (Germany) Helmut Richert (1989–90)
- (Austria) Hans Trittinger (1990–91)
- (Germany) Hans-Joachim Abel (1994–96)
- (Switzerland) Hansruedi Fässler (1996–97)
- (Austria) Alfons Dobler (1997–99)
- (Germany) Uwe Wegmann (1999–02)
- (Austria) Walter Hörmann (2002–03)
- (Switzerland) Martin Andermatt (2003–05)
- (Germany) Hans-Joachim Weller (2005)
- (Sweden) Mats Gren (2005–06)
- (Italy) Maurizio Jacobacci (2006–07)
- (Germany) Hans-Joachim Weller (2007)
- (Switzerland) Heinz Hermann (2007–08)
- (Germany) Pierre Littbarski (2008–10)
- (Netherlands) Eric Orie (2010–12)
- (Germany) Sebastian Selke (2012) (Interim)
- (Switzerland) Giorgio Contini (2012–17)
- (Liechtenstein) Daniel Hasler (2017) (Interim)
- (Germany) Roland Vrabec (2017–2018)
- (Liechtenstein) Mario Frick (2018–2022)
- (Switzerland) Alessandro Mangiarratti (2022)
- (Germany) Jürgen Seeberger (2023)
- (Germany) Jan Meyer (interim) (2023)
- (Liechtenstein) Martin Stocklasa (2023–2024)
- (Switzerland) Marc Schneider (2024–present)

=== Gallery ===
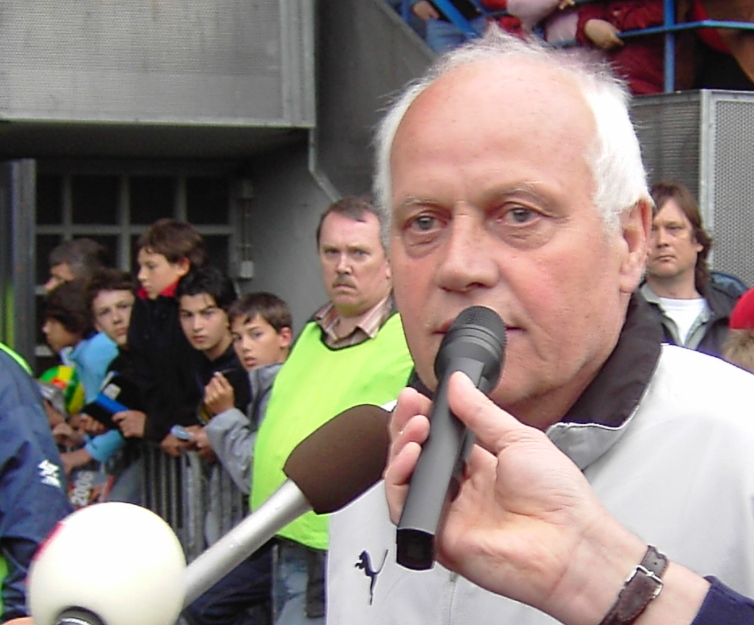
Otto Pfister

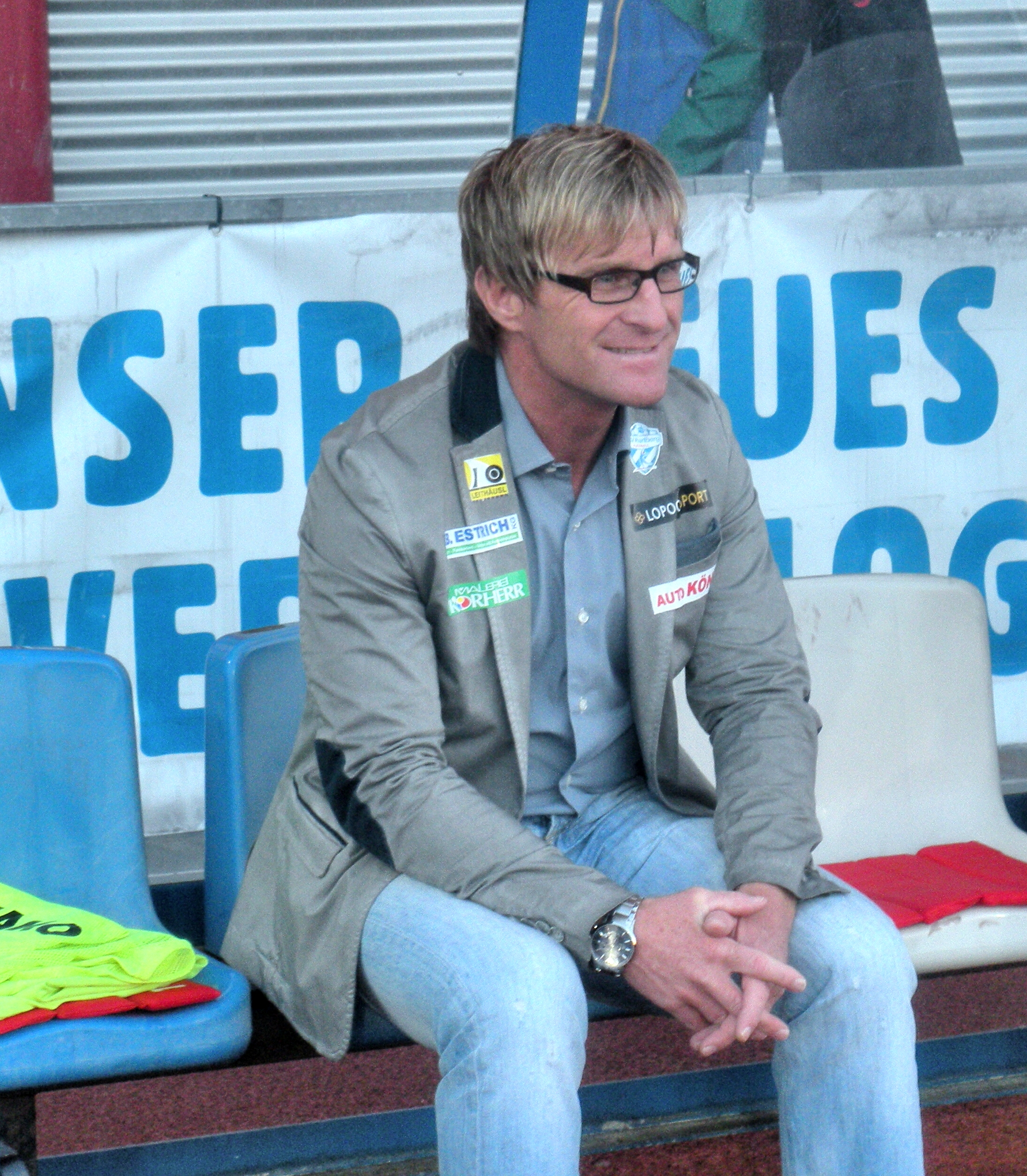
Walter Hörmann

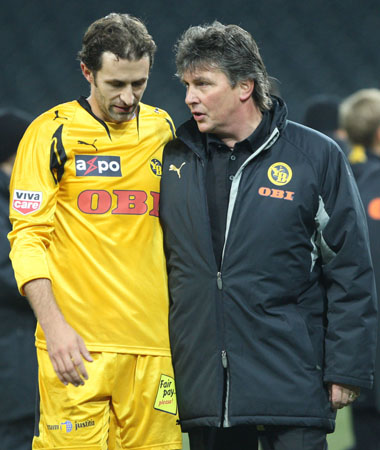
Martin Andermatt

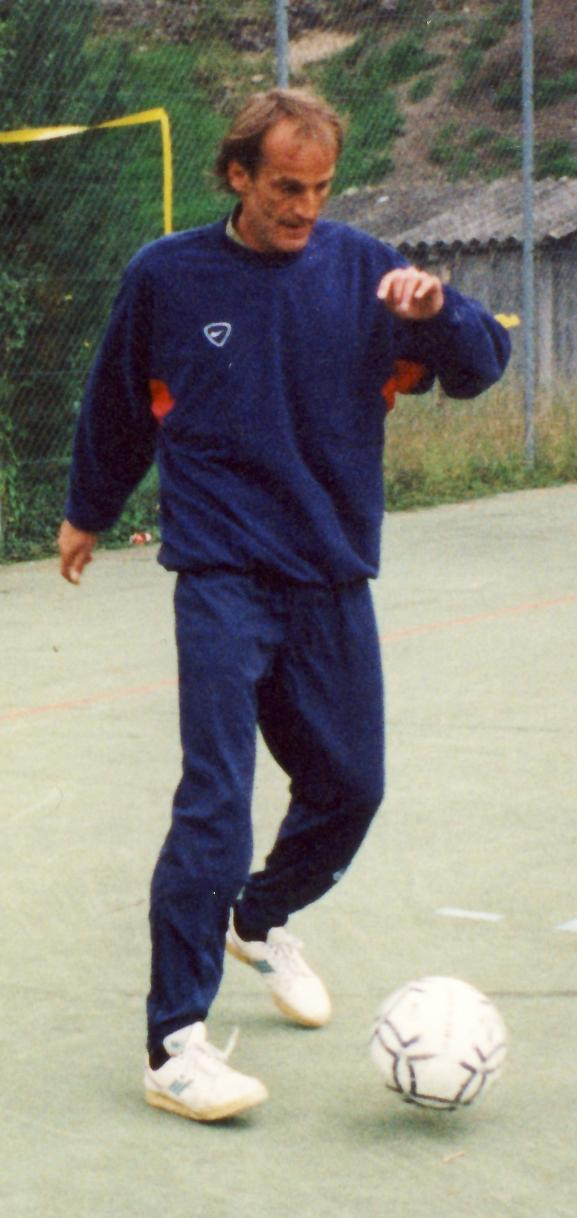
Heinz Hermann

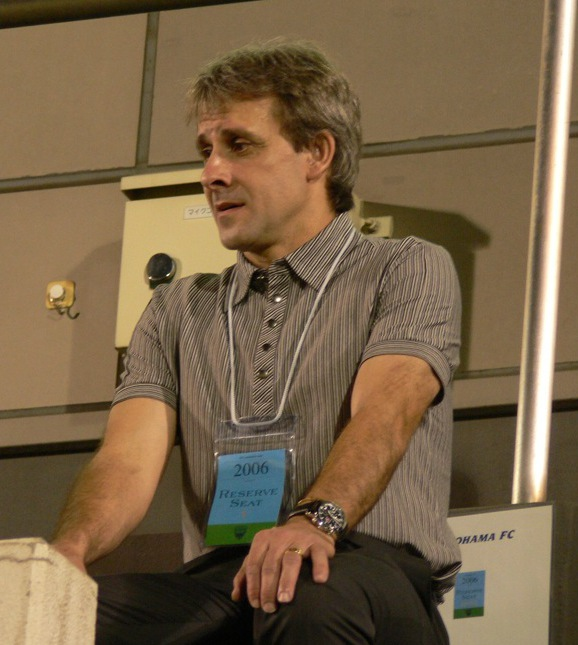
Pierre Littbarski

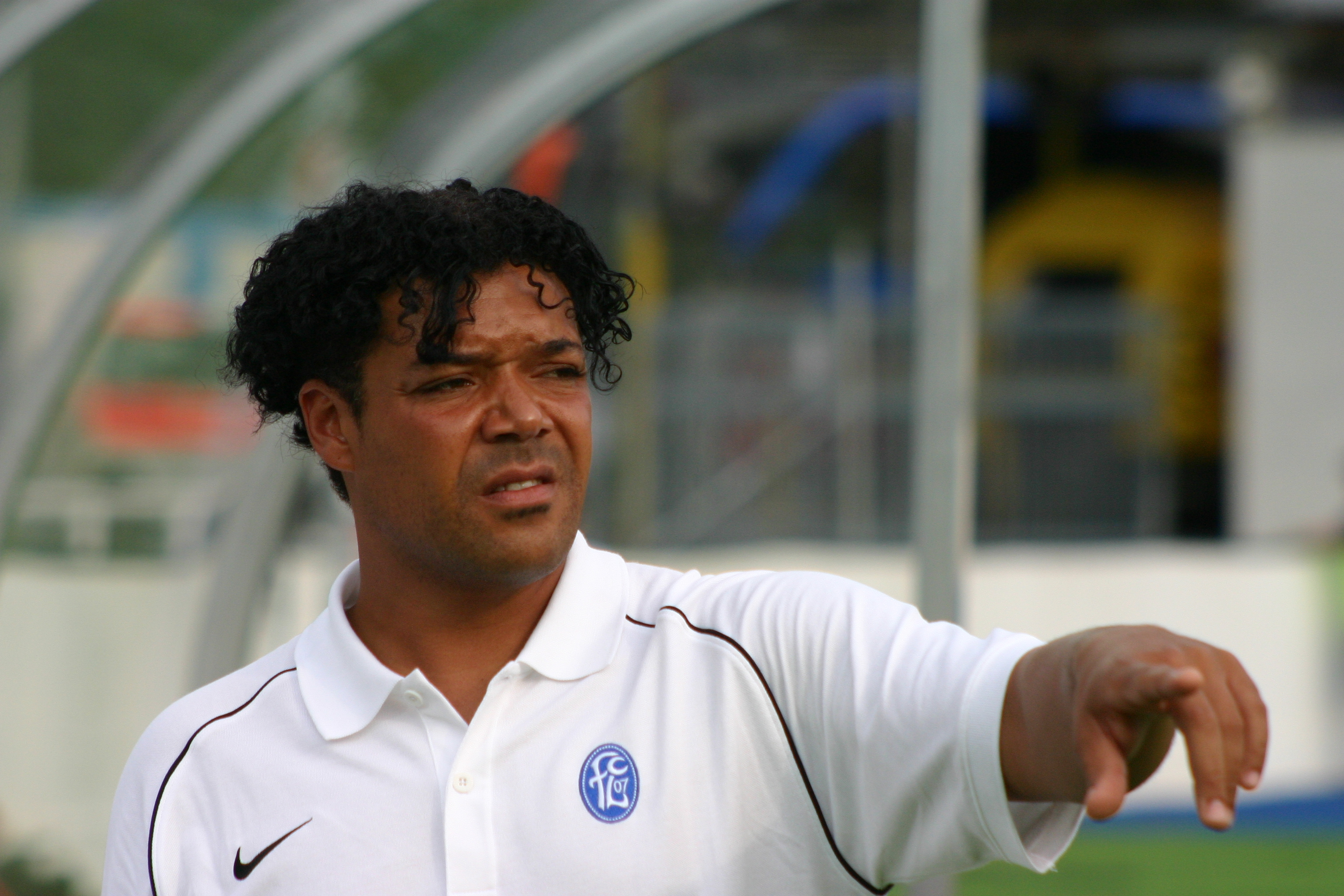
Eric Orie

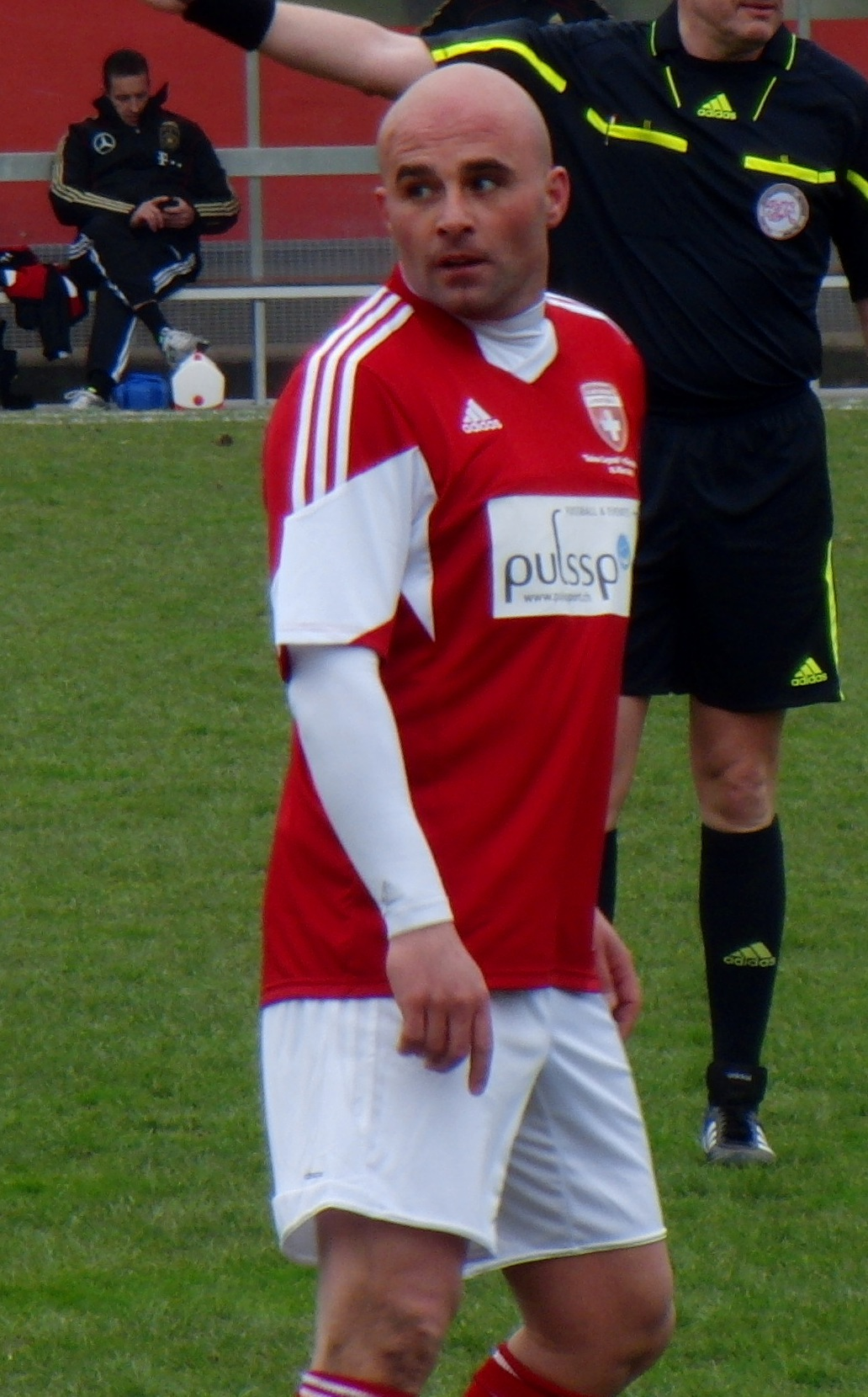
Giorgio Contini

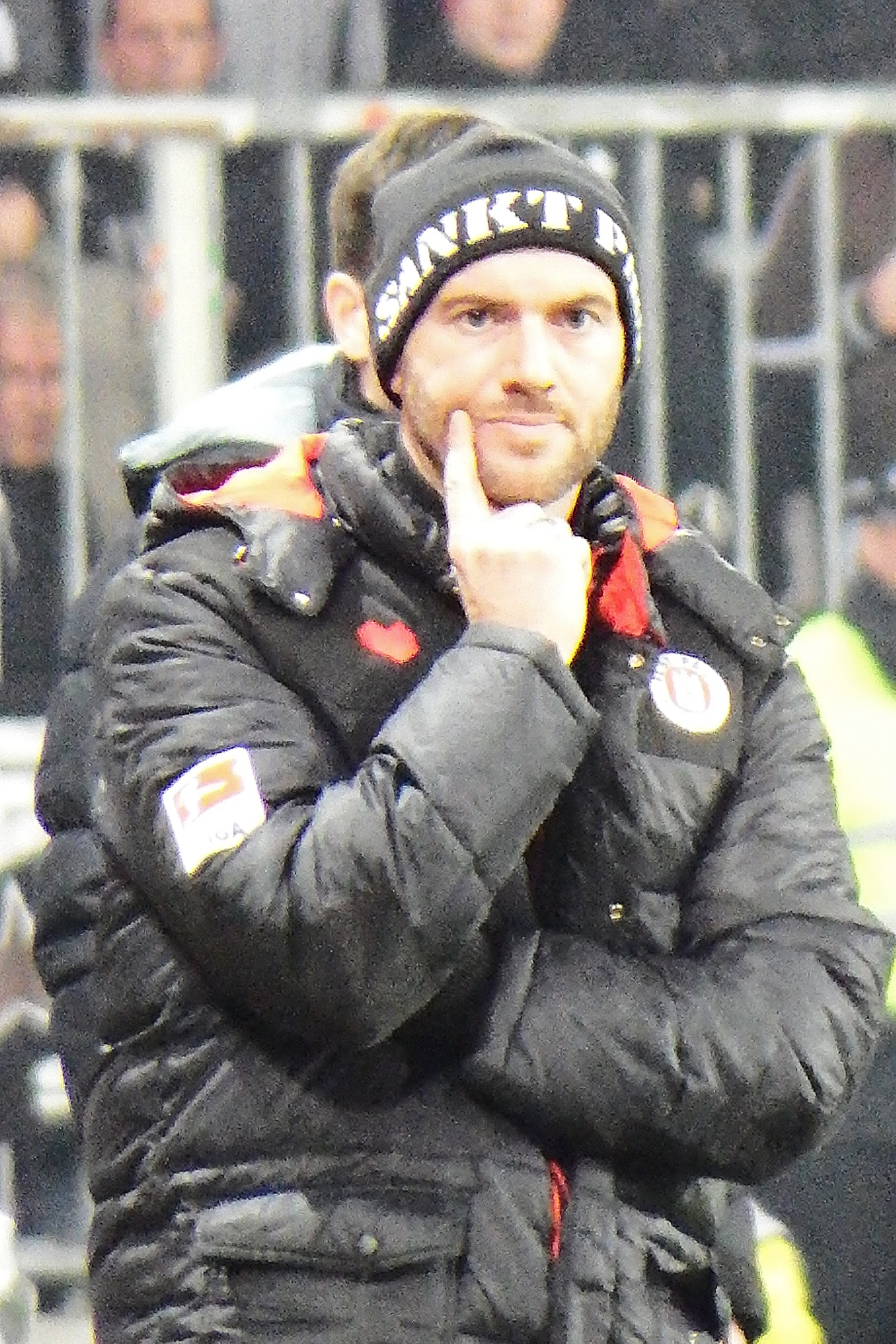
Roland Vrabec

== Former presidents ==
- (Liechtenstein) Johannes Walser (1932–1933)
- (Liechtenstein) Willy Huber (1933–1934)
- (Liechtenstein) Anton Konrad (1934–1936)
- (Liechtenstein) Rudolf Strub (1936–1943)
- (Liechtenstein) Hans Verling (1943–1948)
- (Liechtenstein) Albert Caminada (1948–1950)
- (Liechtenstein) Felix Real (1950–1951)
- (Liechtenstein) Hans Verling (1951–1955)
- (Liechtenstein) Anton Ospelt (1955–1956)
- (Liechtenstein) Otto Hasler (1956–1961)
- (Liechtenstein) Engelbert Schreiber (1961–1964)
- (Liechtenstein) Hilmar Ospelt (1964–1967)
- (Liechtenstein) Kurt Frommelt (1967–1971)
- (Liechtenstein) Norbert Vogt (1971–1973)
- (Liechtenstein) Reinhard Walser (1973–1979)
- (Liechtenstein) Reinold Ospelt (1979–1983)
- (Liechtenstein) Alfons Thöny (1983–1988)
- (Liechtenstein) Andy Rechsteiner (1988–1990)
- (Liechtenstein) Werner Keicher (1990–1997)
- (Liechtenstein) Manfred Moser (1997–2001)
- (Liechtenstein) Marc Brogle (2001–2003)
- (Liechtenstein) Hanspeter Negele (2003–2008)
- (Liechtenstein) Franz Schädler (2008–2009) (Interim)
- (Liechtenstein) Lorenz Gassner (2009–2010) (Acting)
- (Liechtenstein) Albin Johann (2010–2013)
- (Liechtenstein) Ruth Ospelt (2013–2019)
- (Liechtenstein) Patrick Burgmeier (2019–)

== FC Vaduz Red Pride Rugby ==
On 12 March 2012 the new club FC Vaduz Rugby was founded. The rugby union club is involved in the grassroots of the FC Vaduz. Rugby union in Liechtenstein is a minor but growing sport. Liechtenstein has no national governing body of its own, but comes under the Swiss Rugby Federation.
