= Hansruedi Fässler =

Swiss footballer (born 1949)

Personal information
- Full name: Hans-Rudolf Fässler
- Date of birth: 11 January 1949 (age 77)
- Position: Defender

Senior career*
Years	Team	Apps	(Gls)
1977–1983	FC Ibach		

Managerial career
- 1985–1986: FC Zug
- 1988–1991: FC Sursee
- 1992–1995: SC Kriens
- 1996–1997: FC Vaduz
- 2001–2004: FC Tuggen
- 2005–2007: FC Chur 97
- 2014–2017: FC Brunnen
- * Club domestic league appearances and goals

Hansruedi Fässler (born 11 January 1949) is a retired Swiss football defender and later manager.
