= 2021–22 Liechtenstein Cup =

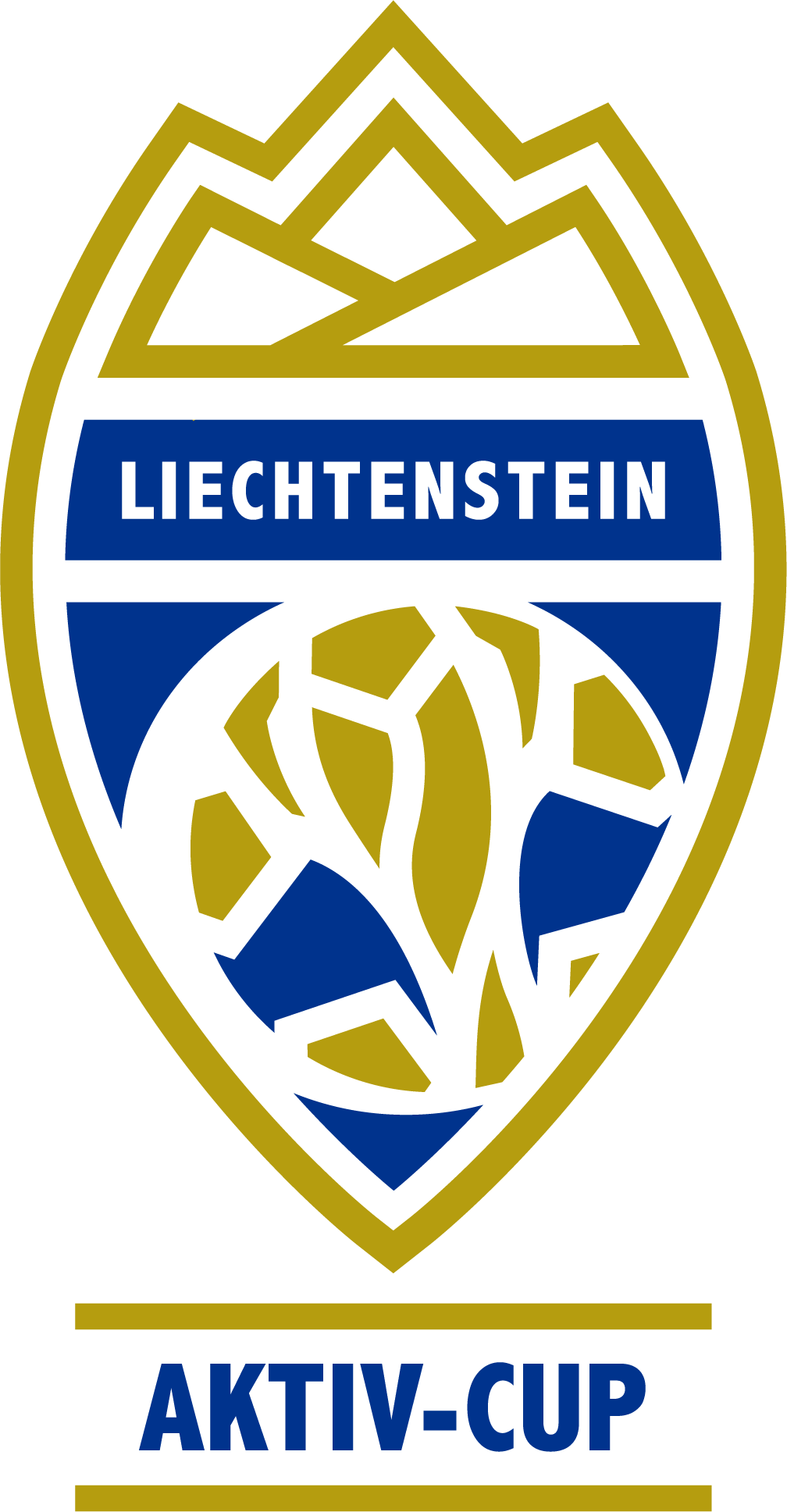

Tournament details
- Country: Liechtenstein
- Teams: 7 (and 9 reserve teams)

Final positions
- Champions: FC Vaduz
- Runners-up: USV Eschen/Mauren

Tournament statistics
- Matches played: 15
- Goals scored: 57 (3.8 per match)

The 2021–22 Liechtenstein Cup was the 77th season of Liechtenstein's annual cup competition. Seven clubs competed with a total of 16 teams for one spot in the second qualifying round of the 2022–23 UEFA Europa Conference League. FC Vaduz were the defending champions.

== Participating clubs ==
2021–22 Swiss Challenge League (2nd tier)	2021–22 1. Liga (4th tier)	2021–22 2. Liga (6th tier)	2021–22 3. Liga (7th tier)	2021–22 4. Liga (8th tier)	2021–22 5. Liga (9th tier)
FC Vaduz ^{TH}	FC Balzers; USV Eschen/Mauren	FC Ruggell; FC Vaduz II	USV Eschen/Mauren II; FC Schaan; FC Triesen; FC Triesenberg	FC Balzers II; USV Eschen/Mauren III; FC Ruggell II; FC Triesen II; FC Triesenberg II	FC Schaan II; FC Vaduz III

^{TH} Title holders.

== First round ==
The first round involved all except the eight highest-placed teams. The draw took place on August 4, 2021.

Team 1	Score	Team 2
28 September 2021
FC Vaduz III (9)	1–3	FC Balzers II (8)
FC Schaan II (9)	5–4	FC Triesen II (8)
FC Ruggell II (8)	2–2 (a.e.t.) (5–4 p)	USV Eschen/Mauren II (7)
29 September 2021
FC Triesenberg II (8)	0–1	USV Eschen/Mauren III (8)

== Second round ==
The draw took place on October 4, 2021.

Team 1	Score	Team 2
29 October 2021
FC Ruggell II (8)	2–0 (a.e.t.)	USV Eschen/Mauren III (8)
2 November 2021
FC Schaan II (9)	0–6	FC Triesen (7)
3 November 2021
FC Balzers II (8)	0–2	FC Vaduz II (6)
10 November 2021
FC Triesenberg (7)	1–2	FC Schaan (7)

== Quarter-finals ==
The quarter-finals involved the four teams who won in the second round, as well as the top four highest placed teams (FC Vaduz, FC Balzers, USV Eschen/Mauren and FC Ruggell). The draw took place on November 23, 2021.

Team 1	Score	Team 2
15 March 2022
FC Triesen (7)	2–5	FC Balzers (4)
FC Ruggell II (8)	0–12	FC Vaduz (2)
FC Schaan (7)	0–4	USV Eschen/Mauren (4)
16 March 2022
FC Vaduz II (6)	1–2	FC Ruggell (6)

== Semi-finals ==
The semi-finals involved the four teams who won in the quarter-final round.

Team 1	Score	Team 2
15 April 2022
FC Balzers (4)	1–3 (a.e.t.)	FC Vaduz (2)
FC Ruggell (6)	0–1	USV Eschen/Mauren (4)

== Final ==
3 May 2022
20:00

USV Eschen/Mauren	1–3	FC Vaduz
Kühne 45'	Report	Di Giusto 7', 64'; Sutter 66'

Rheinpark Stadion, Vaduz
Attendance: 585
Referee: Sven Wolfensberger (Switzerland)
