= Moreno Merenda =

Swiss footballer and manager (born 1978)

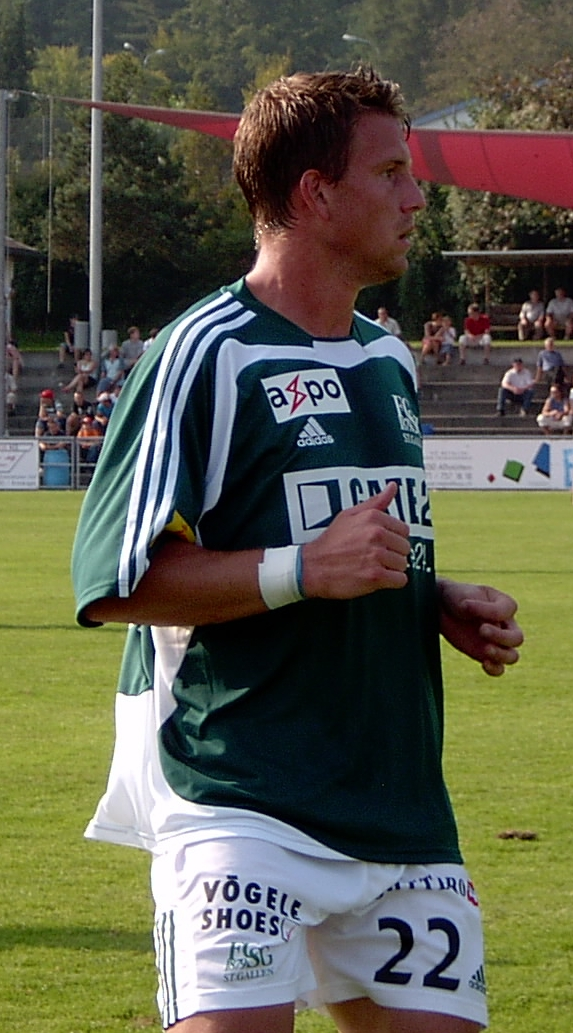

Personal information
- Date of birth: 17 May 1978 (age 48)
- Place of birth: Baar, Switzerland
- Height: 1.85 m (6 ft 1 in)
- Position: Striker

Senior career*
Years	Team	Apps	(Gls)
1995–1998	FC Luzern	24	(1)
1998	Neuchâtel Xamax	1	(0)
1999	FC Locarno	12	(1)
1999	BSC Young Boys	19	(2)
2000	FC Wohlen	0	(0)
2000–2001	FC Baden	29	(17)
2001–2002	FC Vaduz	55	(40)
2002–2005	FC St. Gallen	87	(22)
2006	FC Schaffhausen (loan)	18	(3)
2006–2008	Neuchâtel Xamax	65	(29)
2008–2010	FC St. Gallen	27	(31)
2010–2012	FC Vaduz	50	(28)
2012–2015	SC Cham		

International career
	Switzerland U-21	3	(0)
- * Club domestic league appearances and goals

Moreno Merenda (born 17 May 1978) is a former Swiss footballer and the current assistant manager of SC Cham.

== Career ==
Merenda was born in Baar, and began his football career at home town club FC Baar. He made the transition to professional football in 1995, moving to the Swiss team FC Luzern. After signing for Liechtenstein-based FC Vaduz in 2001, Merenda enjoyed two personally successful seasons, where he managed to earn the interest of his next club FC St. Gallen. Although unable to secure a regular place in the lineup, he regularly scored for his side. He was thus held in high regard by fans and the press.

Being unhappy with the personal situation in St. Gallen, the club made the striker available for loan in December 2005.

On 1 January 2006, Merenda joined FC Schaffhausen on loan until 30 June 2006.

On 1 August 2006 Merenda was released from FC St. Gallen and rejoined his former club Neuchâtel Xamax on a free transfer.

The 2006–2007 season saw Merenda on top form again as he hit 22 goals in 34 appearances upon returning to his former club Neuchâtel Xamax, helping them earn promotion to the Swiss Super League. Having made 65 appearances for Xamax over two seasons, he rejoined his former club St. Gallen for the 2008–2009 season.

On 1 July 2015 Merenda decided not to renew his contract with SC Cham and retired from football, starting his coaching career as assistant manager of the team.

== International life ==
In his youth, Merenda also won Swiss U-21 honours.
