= 2003–04 Liechtenstein Cup =

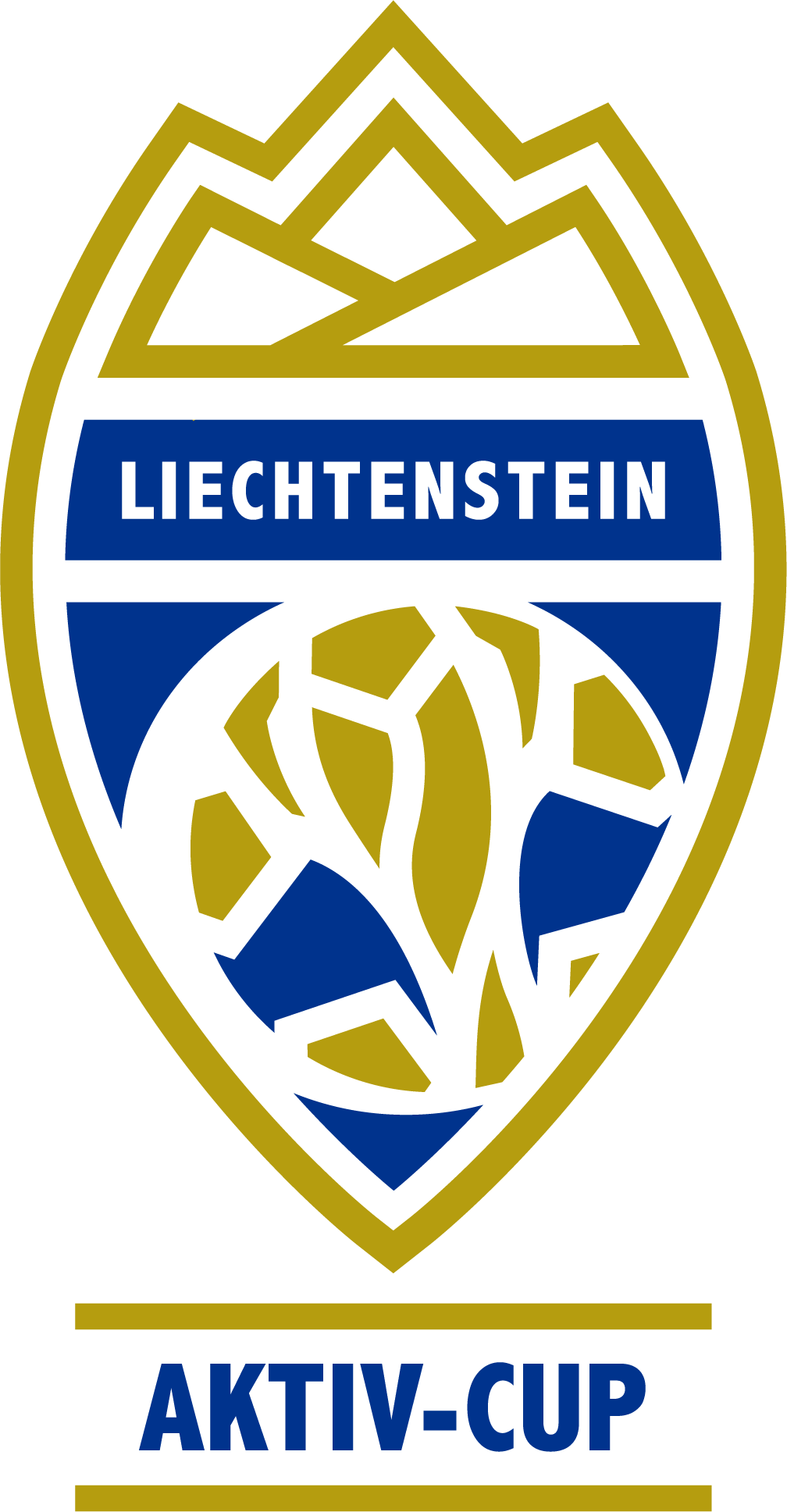
- Logo of the Cup competition of the Liechtenstein Football Association

Tournament details
- Country: Liechtenstein

Final positions
- Champions: FC Vaduz
- Runners-up: FC Balzers

The 2003–04 Liechtenstein Cup was the fifty-ninth season of Liechtenstein's annual cup competition. Seven clubs competed with a total of sixteen teams for one spot in the first qualifying round of the UEFA Cup. Defending champions were FC Vaduz, who have won the cup continuously since 1998.

== Qualifying round ==
Team 1	Score	Team 2
23 September 2003
FC Vaduz II	0–1	FC Triesen III
24 September 2003
USV Eschen/Mauren IV	2–2 (a.e.t.) (2–4 p)	FC Schaan II
FC Triesen II	0–0 (a.e.t.) (3–4 p)	USV Eschen/Mauren III

== First round ==
Team 1	Score	Team 2
21 October 2003
FC Schaan II	0–11	FC Vaduz
FC Balzers II	0–1	FC Triesen
FC Ruggell	2–4	USV Eschen/Mauren II
22 October 2003
FC Ruggell II	1–5	USV Eschen/Mauren
FC Triesenberg II	3–2	FC Schaan
FC Schaan III	2–5	FC Triesenberg
FC Triesen III	3–2	USV Eschen/Mauren III
1 April 2004
FC Vaduz II	0–1	FC Balzers

== Quarterfinals ==
Team 1	Score	Team 2
7 April 2004
USV Eschen/Mauren II	2–3	FC Balzers
FC Triesen III	1–2	FC Triesenberg
10 April 2004
FC Triesenberg II	0–11	USV Eschen/Mauren
12 April 2004
FC Triesen	0–9	FC Vaduz

== Semifinals ==
Team 1	Score	Team 2
5 May 2004
FC Triesenberg	1–2	FC Balzers
19 May 2004
USV Eschen/Mauren	2–5	FC Vaduz

== Final ==
25 May 2004

FC Vaduz	5–0	FC Balzers
M. Polverino 30'; D. Polverino 31', 79'; Pérez 45'; Gohouri 73'

Rheinpark Stadion, Vaduz
Attendance: 700
Referee: Reto Rutz (Liechtenstein)
