= 2009–10 Liechtenstein Cup =

Tournament details
- Country: Liechtenstein

Final positions
- Champions: FC Vaduz
- Runners-up: USV Eschen/Mauren

The 2009–10 Liechtenstein Cup was the sixty-fifth season of Liechtenstein's annual football cup competition. Seven clubs competed with a total of eighteen teams for one spot in the second qualifying round of the UEFA Europa League. Defending champions were FC Vaduz, who won the cup continuously since 1998 and defended their title.

== First round ==
The First Round featured twelve teams. The only first teams of a club that had to compete in this round were FC Triesen and FC Triesenberg, while the other two teams eligible for the first round, FC Ruggell and FC Balzers II, received a bye. The games were played on 18 – 19 August 2009.

Team 1	Score	Team 2
18 August 2009
FC Balzers III	2–1	FC Vaduz Portuguese
USV Echen/Mauren II	3–2	FC Triesen
FC Ruggell II	2–4	FC Triesen II
19 August 2009
FC Triesenberg II	0–6	FC Schaan Azzurri
USV Eschen/Mauren III	4–6	FC Vaduz II
FC Vaduz IV	0–3	FC Triesenberg

== Second round ==
The six winners of the First Round, along with the two teams who had received a bye, competed in the Second Round. The first teams of FC Balzers, USV Eschen/Mauren, FC Schaan and FC Vaduz were all given a bye in this round. The games were played on 15, 16, and 23 September 2009.

Team 1	Score	Team 2
15 September 2009
FC Schaan Azzurri	0–3	FC Triesenberg
FC Triesen II	0–3	FC Balzers II
16 September 2009
FC Vaduz II	1–9	FC Ruggell
23 September 2009
FC Balzers III	0–6	USV Eschen/Mauren II

== Quarterfinals ==
The four winners of the Second Round, along with the four teams who had received a bye, competed in the Quarterfinals. The games were played on 20, 21, 27, and 28 October 2009.

Team 1	Score	Team 2
20 October 2009
FC Balzers II	0–8	FC Vaduz
21 October 2009
USV Eschen/Mauren II	1–0	FC Schaan
27 October 2009
FC Ruggell	2–4	FC Balzers
28 October 2009
FC Triesenberg	0–3	USV Eschen/Mauren

== Semifinals ==
The four winners of the Quarterfinals competed in the Semifinals. The games were played on 6 April 2010.

Team 1	Score	Team 2
6 April 2010
FC Balzers	0–4	FC Vaduz
USV Eschen/Mauren II	2–6	USV Eschen/Mauren

== Final ==
The final, played between FC Vaduz and USV Eschen/Mauren was played in the national stadium, Rheinpark Stadion, which is also FC Vaduz' home-ground. At full-time the score was 1-1, but after penalties FC Vaduz had a winning scoreline of 4–2. The game was played on 13 May 2010.

13 May 2010
17:00 CET

Vaduz	1–1 (a.e.t.)	Eschen/Mauren
Cerrone 71'		Clemente 56'
Penalties
Cerrone (penalty scored); Stuckmann (penalty scored); Stegmayer (penalty scored); Proschwitz (penalty scored)	4–2	(penalty scored) Sturzenegger; (penalty missed) S. Büchel; (penalty scored) Domuzeti; (penalty missed) Memeti

Rheinpark Stadion, Vaduz
Attendance: 2,250
Referee: Marco Speranda (Switzerland)
