= Michael Stuckmann =

German footballer

Personal information
- Date of birth: 1 September 1979 (age 47)
- Place of birth: Bochum, West Germany
- Height: 1.86 m (6 ft 1 in)
- Position: Defender

Youth career
- –1998: Rot-Weiß Markania Bochum
- VfL Bochum

Senior career*
Years	Team	Apps	(Gls)
1998–2004	SG Wattenscheid 09	120	(7)
2004–2009	Wuppertaler SV Borussia	168	(9)
2009–2010	FC Vaduz	14	(0)
2010–2012	Borussia Mönchengladbach II	26	(0)
Total		328	(16)

International career
1998–1999	Germany U20	15	(2)
- * Club domestic league appearances and goals

Michael Stuckmann (born 1 September 1979) is a German former professional footballer who played as a defender.

== Club career ==
Born in Bochum, Stuckmann began his career with Rot-Weiß Markania Bochum before joining the youth team of the local rival VfL Bochum. After a successful season with VfL Bochum he signed in summer 1998 with the city rival SG Wattenscheid 09 and earned four caps in his first season in the 2. Bundesliga. He played six seasons for SG Wattenscheid 09 making 120 appearances. In July 2004, and after the relegation of SG Wattenscheid 09, he signed for the newly promoted Regionalliga club Wuppertaler SV Borussia. Stuckmann was one of the best players in the Wuppertaler SV Borussia over the years and left the team after 168 games to sign for the Swiss Super League relegated club FC Vaduz, who was named in the course of the season from head coach Pierre Littbarski as the new captain of the team.

== International career ==
Stuckmann earned 15 caps and scored two goals for the German under-20.
