= 2000–01 Liechtenstein Cup =

Tournament details
- Country: Liechtenstein

Final positions
- Champions: FC Vaduz
- Runners-up: FC Ruggell

The 2000–01 Liechtenstein Cup was the fifty-sixth season of Liechtenstein's annual cup competition. Seven clubs competed with a total of fifteen teams for one spot in the qualifying round of the UEFA Cup. Defending champions were FC Vaduz, who have won the cup continuously since 1998.

== First round ==
Team 1	Score	Team 2
17 October 2000
FC Vaduz III	0–3	USV Eschen/Mauren
FC Triesen II	3–8	FC Schaan
FC Balzers II	1–2	FC Schaan II
FC Triesenberg II	3–4 (a.e.t.)	FC Ruggell II
18 October 2000
FC Triesen	1–0	FC Vaduz II
USV Eschen/Mauren II	0–6	FC Balzers
FC Triesenberg	0–3	FC Ruggell

== Quarterfinals ==
Team 1	Score	Team 2
7 November 2000
FC Schaan II	1–9	USV Eschen/Mauren
FC Ruggell II	1–13	FC Vaduz
8 November 2000
FC Triesen	2–0	FC Balzers
FC Schaan	1–4	FC Ruggell

== Semifinals ==
Team 1	Score	Team 2
14 March 2001
FC Triesen	0–4	FC Vaduz
3 April 2001
FC Ruggell	1–0	USV Eschen/Mauren

== Final ==
9 May 2001

FC Vaduz	9–0	FC Ruggell
Wegmann 8'; Slikys 22', 78'; Euchil 45', 55', 66'; Polverino 52', 64', 88'

Rheinpark Stadion, Vaduz
Attendance: 911
