= 2005–06 Liechtenstein Cup =

Tournament details
- Country: Liechtenstein

Final positions
- Champions: FC Vaduz
- Runners-up: FC Balzers

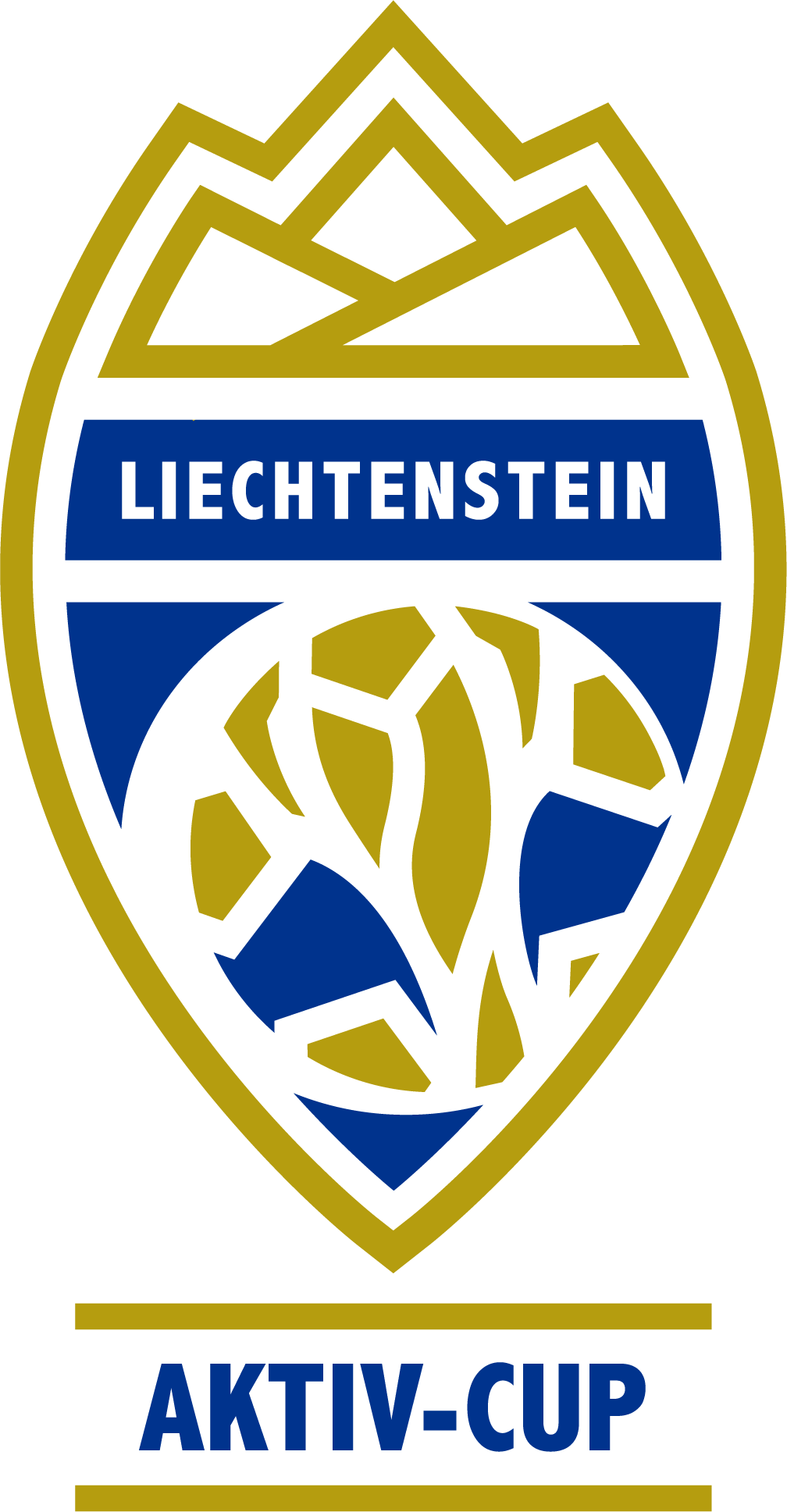
logo of the Liechtenstein Cup

The 2005–06 Liechtenstein Cup was the sixty-first season of Liechtenstein's annual cup competition. Seven clubs competed with a total of sixteen teams for one spot in the first qualifying round of the UEFA Cup. Defending champions were FC Vaduz, who have won the cup continuously since 1998.

== First round ==
Team 1	Score	Team 2
13 September 2005
FC Vaduz III	2–3 (a.e.t.)	USV Eschen/Mauren II
FC Schaan II	3–4 (a.e.t.)	FC Schaan
FC Balzers II	2–0	FC Triesenberg
14 September 2005
FC Triesenberg II	0–6	USV Eschen/Mauren
FC Triesen Español	0–9	FC Balzers
FC Ruggell II	0–3	FC Schaan
FC Vaduz II	0–3	FC Triesen
FC Schaan Azzurri	0–12	FC Vaduz

== Quarterfinals ==
Team 1	Score	Team 2
18 October 2005
FC Schaan	1–2	FC Balzers
FC Triesen	0–4	USV Eschen/Mauren
19 October 2005
FC Balzers II	0–12	FC Vaduz
USV Eschen/Mauren II	1–2	FC Ruggell

== Semifinals ==
Team 1	Score	Team 2
8 November 2005
FC Ruggell	1–2	FC Balzers
9 November 2005
USV Eschen/Mauren	1–3	FC Vaduz

== Final ==
17 April 2006

FC Vaduz	4–2 (a.e.t.)	FC Balzers
Ritzberger 13'; Antić 71'; Sara 97'; Telser 104'		Angelov 40'; Büchel 90' (pen.)

Rheinpark Stadion, Vaduz
Attendance: 1,000
Referee: Reto Rutschi (Switzerland)
