= 2010–11 Liechtenstein Cup =

Tournament details
- Country: Liechtenstein

Final positions
- Champions: FC Vaduz
- Runners-up: USV Eschen/Mauren

The 2010–11 Liechtenstein Cup was the sixty-sixth season of Liechtenstein's annual cup competition. Seven clubs competed with a total of seventeen teams for one spot in the second qualifying round of the UEFA Europa League. Defending champions were Vaduz, who had won the cup continuously since 1998 and won their 39th Liechtenstein Cup the previous season.

== First round ==
The First Round featured ten teams. In this round nine of the reserve clubs participating in the competition entered, along with Triesen. These matches took place on 17 and 18 August 2010.

Team 1	Score	Team 2
17 August 2010
USV Eschen/Mauren III	5–1	FC Triesenberg II
FC Vaduz Portuguese	1–3	FC Triesen II
FC Balzers III	4–2	FC Ruggell II
18 August 2010
FC Vaduz II	0–5	FC Triesen
FC Schaan Azzurri	5–2	FC Balzers II

== Second round ==
The five winners of the First Round, along with FC Schaan, FC Triesenberg and FC Ruggell competed in the Second Round. The games were played on 14 and 15 September 2010.

Team 1	Score	Team 2
14 September 2010
FC Schaan Azzurri	1–2	FC Ruggell
FC Triesen II	1–4	FC Balzers III
15 September 2010
USV Eschen/Mauren III	1–4	FC Triesen
FC Schaan	0–1	FC Triesenberg

== Quarterfinals ==
The four winners of the Second Round reached the Quarterfinals, along with the semifinalists from the previous season's competitions: FC Vaduz, USV Eschen/Mauren, FC Balzers and USV Eschen/Mauren II.

Team 1	Score	Team 2
19 October 2010
FC Ruggell	1–8	FC Vaduz
FC Balzers III	0–6	USV Eschen/Mauren
20 October 2010
FC Triesen	1–13	Balzers
USV Eschen/Mauren II	1–2	FC Triesenberg

== Semifinals ==
The four winners of the Quarterfinals competed in the Semifinals.

Team 1	Score	Team 2
5 April 2011
FC Vaduz	8–0	FC Triesenberg
12 April 2011
USV Eschen/Mauren	2–1	FC Balzers

== Final ==
The final was played in the national stadium, the Rheinpark Stadion.

25 April 2011
17:00 CET

FC Vaduz	5–0	USV Eschen/Mauren
Harrer 38'; Sara 52'; Schwegler 64'; Arlan 73'; Ciccone 90+2'

Rheinpark Stadion, Vaduz
Attendance: 2,155
Referee: Nikolaj Hänni (Switzerland)
