= USV Eschen/Mauren =

Association football club in Liechtenstein

Eschen/Mauren
- Full name: Unterländer Spielervereinigung; Eschen/Mauren
- Founded: 3 December 1963; 62 years ago
- Ground: Sportpark Eschen-Mauren; Eschen, Liechtenstein
- Capacity: 6,000 (500 seated)
- Chairman: Markus Kaiser
- Manager: Michele Polverino
- League: 1. Liga Classic
- 2025–26: 1. Liga Classic, Group 3, 13th of 16
- Website: https://usv.li/
Home colours	Away colours

USV Eschen/Mauren is a Liechtensteiner football club from Eschen and Mauren.

They play at the Sportpark Eschen-Mauren, which used to be the national football stadium, until the Rheinpark Stadion in Vaduz was built. USV Eschen/Mauren, like all other Liechtensteiner teams, play in the Swiss Football League system. The first team plays in 1. Liga Classic, the fourth tier of Swiss football.

The club was originally formed in 1963 as a merger of FC Mauren and FC Eschen. Since 1975, the first team has always played in Liga 2 except for the 1999–2000 season when they were promoted to 1. Liga, Group 3 before being relegated back again to 2. Liga Interregional. After the 2007–08 season, it won promotion once again.

USV has won the Liechtensteiner Cup on five occasions, the most recent being in 2012 and 18 occasions have been runner-up.

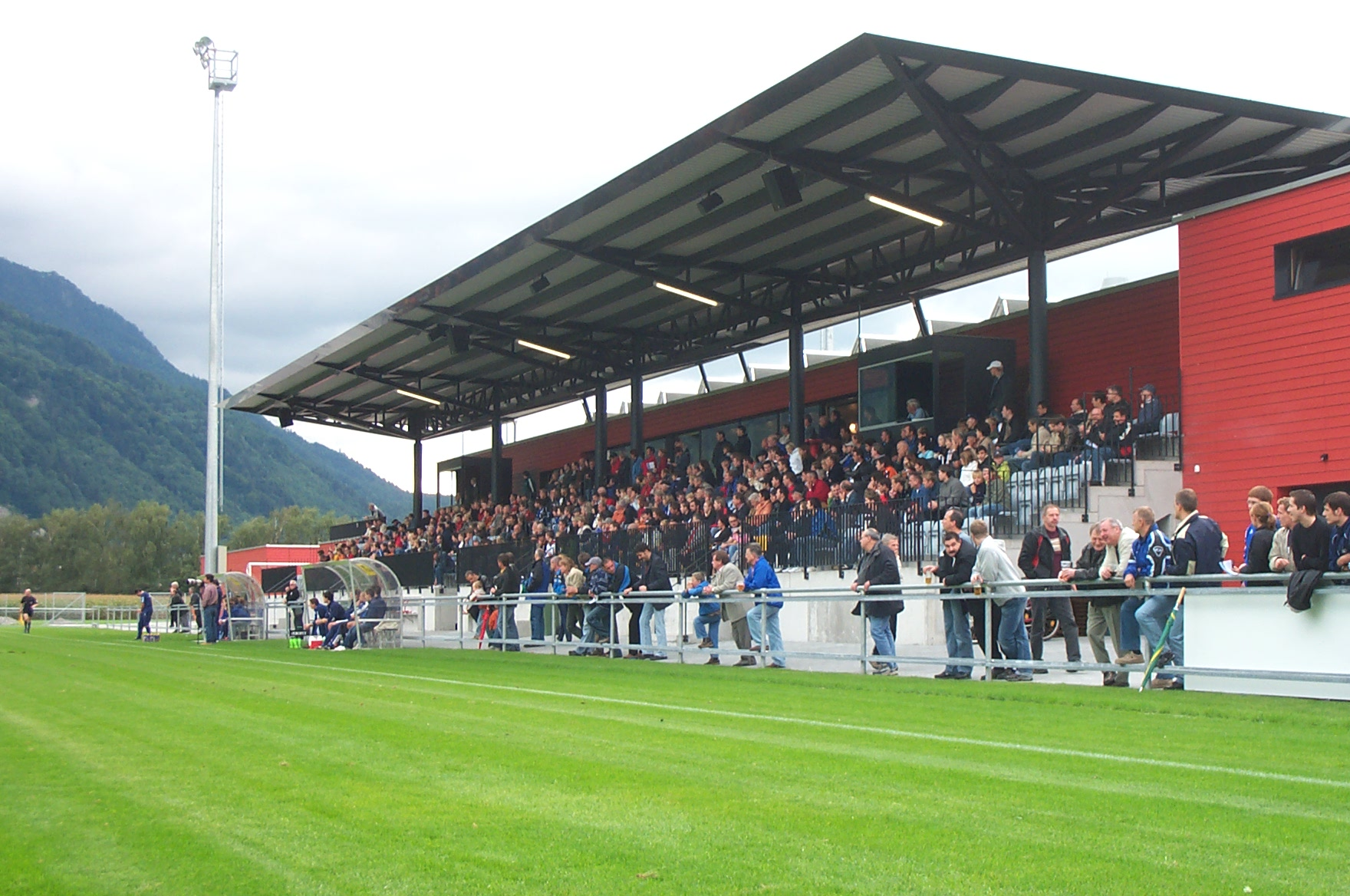
Sportpark Eschen-Mauren

Former crest of USV Eschen/Mauren

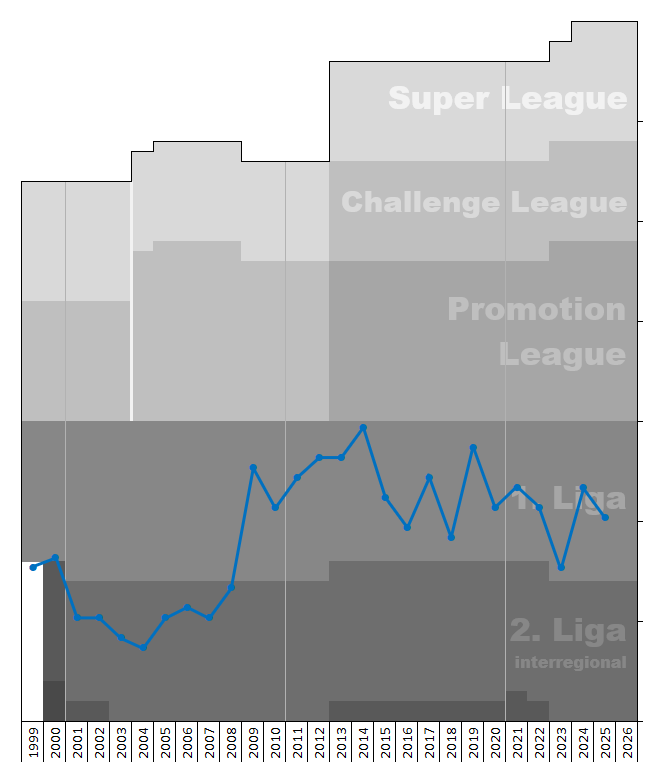
Chart of USV Eschen/Mauren table positions in the Swiss football league system

== Honours ==
- Liechtenstein Football Cup
  - Winners (5): 1976, 1977, 1978, 1987, 2012
  - Runners-up (18): 1979, 1982, 1983, 1985, 1988, 1989, 1990, 1995, 1996, 1998, 2002, 2005, 2009, 2010, 2011, 2014, 2017, 2022

== European record ==
Season	Competition	Round	Opponent	Home	Away	Aggregate
2012–13	UEFA Europa League	First qualifying round	(Iceland) FH	1–2	0–1	1–3

== Current squad ==
As of 1 October 2026

Note: Flags indicate national team as defined under FIFA eligibility rules; some limited exceptions apply. Players may hold more than one non-FIFA nationality.

No.	Pos.	Nation	Player
1	GK	LIE	Gabriel Foser
3	DF	AUT	Adem Draganovic
4	DF	SUI	Ricard Micevski
5	MF	SUI	Luka Krbanjevic
6	DF	SUI	Marin Cavar
7	MF	SUI	Giosuè Schulthess
8	MF	LIE	Liam Kranz
9	FW	AUT	Niclas Bickel
10	MF	ITA	Medin Murati
11	FW	AUT	Orhan Vojic
12	GK	LIE	Fadri Carigiet
13	DF	LIE	Manoel Honorio

No.	Pos.	Nation	Player
16	DF	SUI	Andri Zimmermann
17	MF	ITA	Emir Murati
18	FW	LIE	Alessandro Lo Russo
19	DF	SUI	Justin Seifert
20	MF	LIE	Aleksandar Zivanovic
21	MF	MNE	Filip Radojicic
22	MF	SUI	Jonas Uehli
23	MF	LIE	Livio Meier
24	DF	SUI	Albanor Sherifi
25	MF	SUI	Enis Nimoni
27	FW	KOS	Benjamin Perkolaj
30	GK	LIE	Silvan Schädler
