= Franz Burgmeier =

Liechtenstein footballer (born 1982)

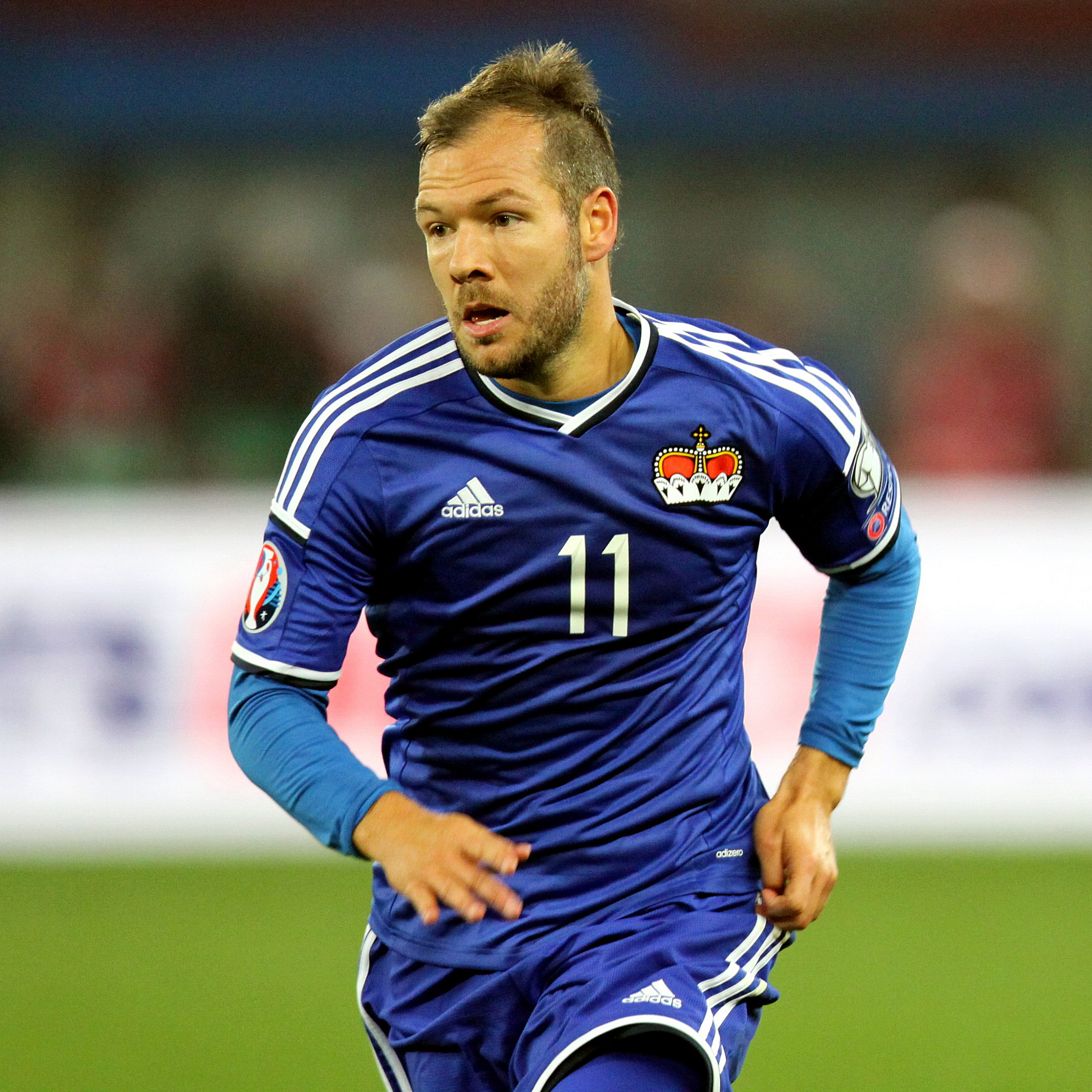
- Burgmeier playing for Liechtenstein in 2015

Personal information
- Full name: Franz Burgmeier
- Date of birth: 7 April 1982 (age 44)
- Place of birth: Triesen, Liechtenstein
- Height: 1.77 m (5 ft 10 in)
- Positions: Midfielder; left back

Youth career
- 1991–1999: Triesen

Senior career*
Years	Team	Apps	(Gls)
1999–2000	Triesen	21	(11)
2000–2005	Vaduz	115	(27)
2005–2006	Aarau	35	(1)
2006–2008	Basel	23	(1)
2008	→ Thun (loan)	17	(0)
2008–2009	Darlington	35	(2)
2009–2018	Vaduz	208	(30)
Total		454	(72)

International career
2001–2018	Liechtenstein	112	(9)

Managerial career
- 2018–2019: Vaduz (Scout)
- 2019–: Vaduz (Director of football)
- * Club domestic league appearances and goals

Franz Burgmeier (born 7 April 1982) is a Liechtenstein former professional footballer, who played as a midfielder. Born in Triesen, Burgmeier was a burgeoning footballer and keen skier, until he gave up the latter sport at 16 following a serious injury. Having been a youth player for Triesen, he started his professional career with Vaduz. Burgmeier won several Liechtensteiner Cups with Vaduz, who were promoted to the Swiss Challenge League in 2001, and played in the UEFA Cup. After two unsuccessful attempts to win promotion to the Swiss Super League, Burgmeier left for Aarau in 2005. He spent only one season with Aarau before a move to the previous season's runners-up Basel in 2006. His two seasons with Basel were broken up by a loan spell with Thun, before he moved to England with Darlington in August 2008, where he played for one year.

Burgmeier won 112 caps and scored nine goals for his country. He was a right-footed player competent as either a left midfielder or left back, with the ability to deliver a good cross. He made his international debut in 2001 against Spain and three years later scored one of the goals that helped secure his country's first point in World Cup qualification matches.

== Personal life ==
Burgmeier was born in Triesen, Liechtenstein, a small town with a population of 4,500, close to the border with Switzerland. He is the younger son of Heinz and Elsbeth, following Patrick Burgmeier, who played football for Vaduz and USV Eschen/Mauren. From a young age, Franz played both football and skied. He played for the Liechtenstein youth team in Swiss competitions from ages 11 to 16, winning the championship when he was 13. However, at 16, a knee injury, which he suffered while skiing, nearly ended his football career and prompted him to stop the former sport.

Burgmeier is married to Monika. She also plays football, as a full back, for FC Triesen, and also is a coach at the youth level for Liechtenstein's women.

== Club career ==
=== Vaduz ===
Burgmeier started out as a youth at Triesen before moving to Vaduz in 2000. Although based in his home country, like all Liechtenstein clubs Vaduz played league football in Switzerland—at the time in the third tier—but also competed in the Liechtenstein Football Cup. In Burgmeier's first season the team won promotion to the Challenge League and won the Liechtenstein Cup with a 9–0 defeat against Ruggell in the final. He scored his first goal at the higher level on 31 July 2001, in a postponed game from the first round of the season, which finished in a 4–1 victory against Thun. However, Vaduz finished in 11th place in the Fall Season, before results improved and they finished in second place in the Final Table, avoiding being relegated. The team also successfully defended their Liechtenstein Cup defeating USV Eschen/Mauren 6–1 in the final.

Vaduz's success in their nation's cup ensured they gained access to the UEFA Cup, and in August 2002, Burgmeier scored his first European goal during a 1–1 with Livingston, the Scottish side's first game in Europe. In the second leg, Vaduz had a late goal disallowed during a 0–0, and so they went out in the qualifying round for the third successive year, losing on the away goals rule. Vaduz topped the Fall Season table that season, but failed to win promotion to the Swiss Super League after finishing fourth in the Final League. Their failure was offset with another victory in the Liechtenstein Cup, this time defeating Balzers in the final.

In June 2003, he was set to join St. Gallen; however, the deal never went through because the Swiss side could not afford the transfer fee. Instead he started with Vaduz, who came closer to gaining promotion but were again unsuccessful, after they lost in the promotion–relegation play-off match. Burgmeier scored one of the goals in the second leg against Neuchâtel Xamax, but Mobulu M'Futi scored to ensure Neuchâtel won over the two legs, and Vaduz stayed in the Challenge League. Despite his side defending their Liechtenstein Cup, Burgmeier missed the final.

However, their cup success helped Vaduz to another UEFA Cup, which resulted in their first win in the competition with a 4–2 aggregate victory against FAI Cup-holders Longford Town in July 2004. Burgmeier netted his second European goal during the ties, during the 3–2 second-leg victory, before they were defeated in the second qualifying round to Belgian-side Beveren, during which Burgmeier was injured forcing him to undergo a knee operation and miss the first month of the league season. Vaduz repeated their efforts domestically, defeating USV Eschen/Mauren in the cup and reaching the promotion play-off game. However, they were defeated by Schaffhausen and were left with only ten players on secure contracts for the following season. Burgmeier himself left Vaduz after five years with the club, during which he played 115 league games and scored 27 goals.

=== Aarau ===
Burgmeier, instead, moved to Aarau in Switzerland. His debut came in a 2–0 league defeat to Thun, before he was substituted near the end of the second half. Aarau were in the Super League, and finished seventh in Burgmeier's only season with the club, in which he played 35 league games. His only league goal came in the second round of matches against St. Gallen, but he also scored in both the first two rounds of the Swiss Cup—his first games in the cup since Vaduz were not eligible for the competition—before they were eliminated in the quarter-finals on penalties. His form with Aarau won Burgmeier the Liechtensteiner Footballer of the Year award, one point ahead of fellow international Mario Frick, and also earned him a move to Basel, for whom he signed a three-year contract.

=== Basel ===
Burgmeier's first role with Basel was to play in the Uhrencup as they defeated German-side FC Köln 2–1, to share the trophy with FC Zürich. Basel had finished the previous season as runners-up in the league to Zürich on goal difference and so qualified for the following season's UEFA Cup. Burgmeier made his Basel debut in the competition as they defeated Kazakhstan's Tobol 3–1 on 13 July, before he was replaced by Scott Chipperfield. The second leg ended in a draw, sending Basel through. The second qualifying round draw gave Burgmeier a chance to return to Vaduz. He was a substitute in both games as his new team won on away goals. They went on to qualify for the group stages, in which they finished bottom of their division, with two points from four games. Burgmeier scored his first goal for his new club in a 4–2 away defeat against Sion, but again the side only ranked in the Championship behind Zürich, this time by one point. Their disappointment was offset by an extra time victory over Luzern in the final of the Swiss Cup.

Burgmeier injured his ankle at the start of the 2007–08 season, and after playing only four league games, Thun signed him on a six-month loan deal in January 2008. He played 17 times for Thun, who finished bottom of the Super League. Thun were also knocked out of the Swiss Cup by Burgmeier's main employers in the semi-finals. On 13 July 2008, his contract with Basel was terminated early to allow him to find himself a new club after just 23 league appearances because he was seen as surplus to requirements by manager Christian Gross.

=== Darlington ===
While playing for Liechtenstein against England in a 2004 European Championships qualifying match at Old Trafford in 2003, Burgmeier was spotted by Max Houghton. Although Liechtenstein lost 2–0, Houghton was impressed by Burgmeier's stamina and effort. When Burgmeier was released by Basel in 2008, Houghton, then 12 years old, suggested to his grandfather, George Houghton, who was chairman of English side Darlington that he should be given a trial. Following a successful trial, Burgmeier, who was keen to move abroad, was signed by the League Two-side on a one-year contract at the end of August 2008 to become the first Liechtensteiner to play in England.

Burgmeier made his debut on 23 August, in a 2–1 defeat to Gillingham at The Darlington Arena. He scored his first goal for Darlington in a 2–1 win against Port Vale on 13 September. Manager Dave Penney praised Burgmeier for the start he made to the club, both as a goal scorer and creator, which also helped him to play his way into the affections of the club's supporters. When Burgmeier won his 49th cap for Liechtenstein against Wales, it was his fourth in the two months since he joined Darlington. It took him past the club record three caps of Canadian Jason de Vos and New Zealander Adrian Webster, with a coach-load of Darlington fans there to see him play at the Millennium Stadium. His next cap clashed with Darlington's FA Cup first round replay with Conference North-side Droylsden, in which they were defeated.

Darlington's promotion campaign was dealt a blow in February 2009, when club chairman George Houghton placed the club in administration. As a result, the club were deducted 10 points, a penalty from which they could not recover finally finishing 12th. Burgmeier finished with two goals during the season having played 35 games, but like the rest of the playing squad, was told he could find a new club by Darlington's administrators.

=== Return to Vaduz ===
Following Darlington's financial problems, Burgmeier returned home to Liechtenstein and signed with his former club Vaduz on a one-year contract after the end of the 2008–09 season.

== International career ==
Burgmeier is a Liechtenstein international who made his debut in a 2002 World Cup qualifier against Spain on 5 September 2001. It was the penultimate game of the side's qualifying campaign, in which they lost all eight games without scoring a goal. Despite starting the qualifying round for 2004 European Championships with a 1–1 draw with Macedonia, Liechtenstein lost their remaining games to finish bottom of their group. Burgmeier featured in seven of the qualification matches.

Burgmeier scored his first international goal in April 2003 in a friendly against Saudi Arabia to give Liechtenstein a 1–0 victory. On 10 October 2004, he scored his first competitive international goal as he helped Liechtenstein to record their first point in World Cup qualification matches. He and Thomas Beck scored Liechtenstein's goals in a 2–2 with Portugal at the Rheinpark Stadion. Burgmeier describes the draw as the "biggest moment of my career". Three days later, Burgmeier scored two more goals as Liechtenstein earned their first World Cup win with a 4–0 victory against Luxembourg. They followed it up with a 0–0 draw against Slovakia and another victory over Luxembourg, to finish the qualifying campaign with eight points from their 12 matches. Burgmeier played in nine games.

Liechtenstein won another two games in their following qualifying campaign—for the 2008 European Championships. They had started with four defeats, in the last of which Burgmeier scored a consolation goal in a 4–1 win for Northern Ireland. A 1–0 victory against Latvia and a draw with Iceland followed, but Liechtenstein picked up only seven points to finish bottom of their group, with Burgmeier playing in all but one game.

Having earned eight points during the 2006 World Cup qualification games, Burgmeier said the target in the 2010 campaign was to pick up "as many points as possible", adding, "For us, the target is not to qualify but to just take each game as it comes, enjoy the matches, and try and do as well as possible." He won his 50th cap in a 4–0 friendly defeat to Slovakia on 19 November 2008. Burgmeier has scored seven goals and picked up a number of opposition shirts which he plans to put in a hall of fame.

On 15 November 2014, he scored his second Euro qualifier and winning goal over Moldova.

== Career statistics ==
=== Club ===
As of 28 September 2015

Appearances and goals by club, season and competition
Club	Season	League			Cup		Europe		Total	
Club	Season	Division	Apps	Goals	Apps	Goals	Apps	Goals	Apps	Goals
Triesen	1999–2000		21	11					21	11
Vaduz	2000–01									
Vaduz	2001–02		26	5					26	5
Vaduz	2002–03	Nationalliga A	31	8					31	8
Vaduz	2003–04	Swiss Challenge League	31	5					31	5
Vaduz	2004–05	Swiss Challenge League	27	9					27	9
Vaduz	Total		115	27					115	27
Aarau	2005–06	Swiss Super League	35	1					35	1
Basel	2006–07	Swiss Super League	19	1			6	0	25	1
Basel	2007–08	Swiss Super League	4	0			2	0	6	0
Basel	Total		23	1			8	0	31	1
Thun (loan)	2007–08	Swiss Challenge League	17	0					17	0
Darlington	2008–09	League Two	35	2	3	0	0	0	38	2
Vaduz	2009–10	Swiss Challenge League	23	1	3	1	3	1	29	3
Vaduz	2010–11	Swiss Challenge League	24	5	2	1	2	0	28	6
Vaduz	2011–12	Swiss Challenge League	22	3	2	1	2	0	26	4
Vaduz	2012–13	Swiss Challenge League	33	5	2	0			35	5
Vaduz	2013–14	Swiss Challenge League	32	2	0	0	2	0	34	2
Vaduz	2014–15	Swiss Challenge League	30	4	0	0	3	0	33	4
Vaduz	2015–16	Swiss Super League	18	2	1	1	0	0	19	3
Vaduz	2016–17	Swiss Super League	14	3	—		1	0	15	3
Vaduz	2017–18	Swiss Challenge League	12	5	—		3	0	15	5
Vaduz	Total		208	30	10	4	16	1	237	35
Career total			454	72	13	4	24	1	491	77

=== International ===
Appearances and goals by national team and year
National team	Year	Apps	Goals
Liechtenstein	1999	1	0
Liechtenstein	2000	0	0
Liechtenstein	2001	2	0
Liechtenstein	2002	5	0
Liechtenstein	2003	7	2
Liechtenstein	2004	7	3
Liechtenstein	2005	7	0
Liechtenstein	2006	7	0
Liechtenstein	2007	8	1
Liechtenstein	2008	7	1
Liechtenstein	2009	8	0
Liechtenstein	2010	4	0
Liechtenstein	2011	6	0
Liechtenstein	2012	6	0
Liechtenstein	2013	7	0
Liechtenstein	2014	7	2
Liechtenstein	2015	8	0
Liechtenstein	2016	7	0
Liechtenstein	2017	6	0
Liechtenstein	2018	2	0
Total		112	9

Scores and results list Liechtenstein's goal tally first, score column indicates score after each Burgmeier Template goal.

List of international goals scored by Franz Burgmeier
No.	Date	Venue	Opponent	Score	Result	Competition
1	30 April 2003	Rheinpark Stadion, Vaduz, Liechtenstein	Saudi Arabia	1–0	1–0	Friendly
2	20 August 2003	Rheinpark Stadion, Vaduz, Liechtenstein	San Marino	2–0	2–2	Friendly
3	9 October 2004	Rheinpark Stadion, Vaduz, Liechtenstein	Portugal	1–2	2–2	2006 FIFA World Cup qualification
4	13 October 2004	Stade Josy Barthel, Luxembourg City, Luxembourg	Luxembourg	2–0	4–0	2006 FIFA World Cup qualification
5	13 October 2004	Stade Josy Barthel, Luxembourg City, Luxembourg	Luxembourg	4–0	4–0	2006 FIFA World Cup qualification
6	24 March 2007	Rheinpark Stadion, Vaduz, Liechtenstein	Northern Ireland	1–3	1–4	UEFA Euro 2008 qualifying
7	26 March 2008	Ta' Qali National Stadium, Ta' Qali, Malta	Malta	1–4	1–7	Friendly
8	21 May 2014	Rheinpark Stadion, Vaduz, Liechtenstein	Belarus	1–5	1–5	Friendly
9	15 November 2014	Zimbru Stadium, Chișinău, Moldova	Moldova	1–0	1–0	UEFA Euro 2016 qualifying

== Honours ==
Vaduz

- 1. Liga Promotion: 2000–01
- Swiss Challenge League: 2002–03, 2013–14
- Liechtensteiner Cup: 2000–01, 2001–02, 2002–03, 2003–04, 2004–05, 2009–10, 2010–11, 2012–13, 2013–14, 2014–15, 2015–16, 2016–17, 2017–18

Basel

- Swiss Super League: 2007–08
- Swiss Cup: 2006–07, 2007–08

Individual

- Liechtensteiner Footballer of the Year: 2005–06

== See also ==
- List of men's footballers with 100 or more international caps
