= 1997–98 Liechtenstein Cup =

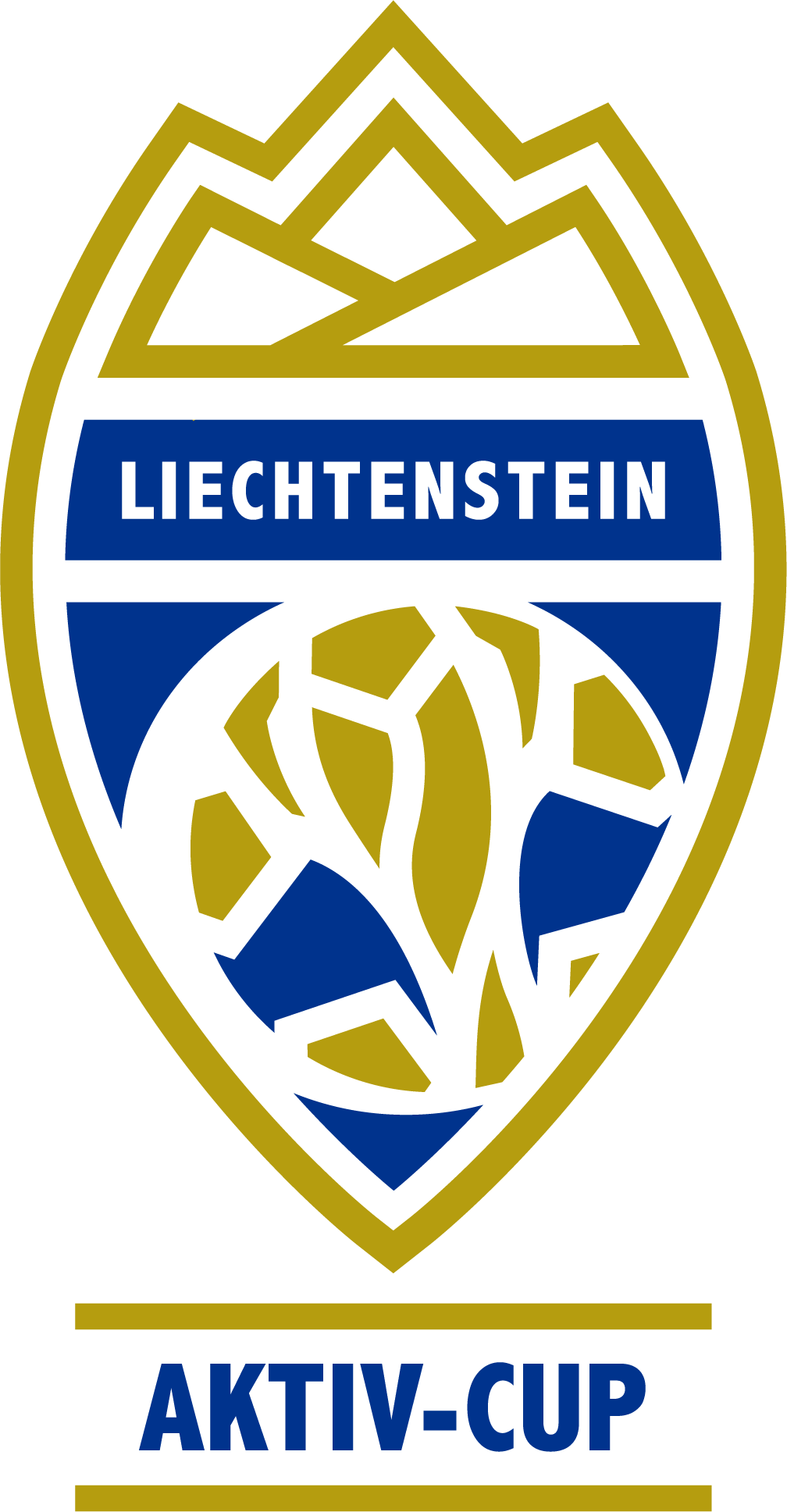
- Logo of the cup competition

Tournament details
- Country: Liechtenstein

Final positions
- Champions: FC Vaduz
- Runners-up: USV Eschen/Mauren

The 1997–98 Liechtenstein Cup was the fifty-third season of Liechtenstein's annual cup competition. Seven clubs competed with a total of sixteen teams for one spot in the qualifying round of the UEFA Cup Winners' Cup. FC Balzers were the defending champions.

== First round ==
| Team 1 | Score | Team 2 |
|---|---|---|
| FC Ruggell | 0–1 | USV Eschen/Mauren |
| FC Triesen II | 0–4 | FC Balzers II |
| FC Schaan II | 0–16 | FC Triesen |
| FC Triesen Español | 0–4 | FC Triesenberg |
| FC Triesenberg II | 0–6 | FC Balzers |
| FC Ruggell II | 5–0 | USV Eschen/Mauren II |
| FC Vaduz II | 2–2 (a.e.t.) (10–11 p) | FC Schaan |
| FC Schaan Azzurri | 0–8 | FC Vaduz |

== Quarterfinals ==
| Team 1 | Score | Team 2 |
|---|---|---|
| FC Triesen | 1–0 | FC Balzers |
| FC Schaan | 0–4 | FC Triesenberg |
| FC Balzers II | 0–9 | FC Vaduz |
| FC Ruggell II | 1–2 | USV Eschen/Mauren |

== Semifinals ==
| Team 1 | Score | Team 2 |
|---|---|---|
| FC Vaduz | 5–0 | FC Triesenberg |
| USV Eschen/Mauren | 3–0 | FC Triesen |

== Final ==
21 May 1998

| FC Vaduz | 5–1 | USV Eschen/Mauren |
|---|---|---|
| Polverino 10', 23', 39', 55'; Hasler 75' | | Kranz 58' |

Freizeitpark Widau, Ruggell
Attendance: 1,350
