= 1999–2000 Liechtenstein Cup =

Tournament details
- Country: Liechtenstein

Final positions
- Champions: FC Vaduz
- Runners-up: FC Balzers

The 1999–2000 Liechtenstein Cup was the fifty-fifth season of Liechtenstein's annual cup competition. Seven clubs competed with a total of fifteen teams for one spot in the qualifying round of the UEFA Cup. Defending champions were FC Vaduz, who have won the cup continuously since 1998.

== First round ==
Team 1	Score	Team 2
19 October 1999
FC Triesen II	3–3 (a.e.t.) (4–3 p)	FC Schaan Azzuri
FC Triesen	1–1 (a.e.t.) (2–1 p)	FC Vaduz II
FC Balzers II	2–1	FC Triesenberg
FC Triesenberg II	0–9	FC Balzers
20 October 1999
USV Eschen/Mauren II	0–3	FC Schaan
FC Ruggell II	2–4 (a.e.t.)	USV Eschen/Mauren
FC Vaduz III	3–0	FC Ruggell

== Quarterfinals ==
Team 1	Score	Team 2
9 November 1999
FC Vaduz III	0–2	FC Balzers
FC Triesen II	0–22	FC Vaduz
2 March 2000
FC Triesen	2–1	USV Eschen/Mauren
5 April 2000
FC Balzers II	1–2	FC Schaan

== Semifinals ==
Team 1	Score	Team 2
11 April 2000
FC Schaan	2–2 (a.e.t.) (7–8 p)	FC Balzers
12 April 2000
FC Triesen	0–3	FC Vaduz

== Final ==
10 May 2000

FC Balzers	0–6	FC Vaduz
		Polverino 7'; Hasler 43', 79'; Hafner 72'; Telser 75'; Šlekys 85'

Rheinpark Stadion, Vaduz
Attendance: 1,200
Referee: Andreas Schluchter (Switzerland)
