= 2011–12 Liechtenstein Cup =

Tournament details
- Country: Liechtenstein

Final positions
- Champions: USV Eschen/Mauren
- Runners-up: FC Vaduz

The 2011–12 Liechtenstein Cup was the sixty-seventh season of Liechtenstein's annual cup competition. Seven clubs competed with a total of sixteen teams for one spot in the first qualifying round of the 2012–13 UEFA Europa League. Defending champions were Vaduz, who have won the cup continuously since 1998 and won their 40th Liechtenstein Cup last season. USV Eschen/Mauren won the cup, beating FC Vaduz on penalties in the final, becoming the first team other than FC Vaduz to win the cup since 1997 (and also the last as of 2025).

== First round ==
The First Round featured eight teams. In this round entered seven of the reserve clubs participating in the competition, along with FC Triesen. These matches took place on 16 and 17 August 2011.

Team 1	Score	Team 2
16 August 2011
FC Ruggell II	1–2	USV Eschen/Mauren II
17 August 2011
USV Eschen/Mauren III	0–1	FC Triesen
FC Triesenberg II	4–0	FC Balzers III
FC Vaduz II	2–2 (a.e.t.) (4–5 p)	FC Triesen II

== Second round ==
The four winners of the First Round, along with FC Schaan, FC Ruggell, FC Schaan Azzurri and FC Balzers II competed in the Second Round. The games were played on 14 September 2011.

Team 1	Score	Team 2
14 September 2011
USV Eschen/Mauren II	3–2	FC Balzers II
FC Ruggell	1–2 (a.e.t.)	FC Schaan
FC Triesen	4–2 (a.e.t.)	FC Schaan Azzurri
FC Triesenberg II	0–3	FC Triesen II

== Quarterfinals ==
The four winners of the Second Round entered the Quarterfinals, along with the semifinalists from last season's competitions: FC Vaduz, USV Eschen/Mauren, FC Balzers and FC Triesenberg.

Team 1	Score	Team 2
18 October 2011
FC Triesen II	0–17	FC Vaduz
25 October 2011
FC Triesen	0−4	USV Eschen/Mauren
26 October 2011
USV Eschen/Mauren II	0−2	FC Triesenberg
2 November 2011
FC Schaan	2−4 (a.e.t.)	FC Balzers

== Semifinals ==
The four winners of the Quarterfinals will compete in the Semifinals.

Team 1	Score	Team 2
9 April 2012
USV Eschen/Mauren	2−1	FC Balzers
10 April 2012
FC Vaduz	3−1	FC Triesenberg

== Final ==
The final was played in the national stadium, Rheinpark Stadion.

16 May 2012
18:30 CET

FC Vaduz	2–2 (a.e.t.)	USV Eschen/Mauren
Cerrone 41' (pen.); Sara 55'	Report (in German)	Manojlović 68' (pen.); Dulundu 90+4'
Penalties
Burgmeier (penalty missed); Schwegler (penalty scored); Trípodi (penalty missed); Cvetinović (penalty scored)	2–4	(penalty scored) Stocklasa; (penalty scored) Simma; (penalty scored) Dulundu; (penalty scored) Manojlović

Rheinpark Stadion, Vaduz
Attendance: 960
Referee: Chris Reisch (Luxembourg)
