= 2012–13 Liechtenstein Cup =

Tournament details
- Country: Liechtenstein
- Teams: 16

Final positions
- Champions: FC Vaduz
- Runners-up: FC Balzers

Tournament statistics
- Matches played: 15
- Goals scored: 49 (3.27 per match)

The 2012–13 Liechtenstein Cup was the sixty-eight season of Liechtenstein's annual cup competition. Seven clubs competed with a total of sixteen teams for one spot in the first qualifying round of the 2013–14 UEFA Europa League. USV Eschen/Mauren were the defending champions.

== First round ==
The First Round featured eight teams. In this round entered seven of the reserve clubs participating in the competition, along with FC Ruggell. The games were played on 21 and 22 August 2012.

Team 1	Score	Team 2
21 August 2012
FC Vaduz II	1−0	FC Triesenberg II
22 August 2012
FC Ruggell II	5−0	FC Triesen II
USV Eschen/Mauren III	0−5	FC Ruggell
FC Balzers III	2−4	USV Eschen/Mauren II

== Second round ==
The four winners of the First Round, along with FC Schaan, FC Schaan Azzurri, FC Triesen and FC Balzers II competed in the Second Round. The games were played on 26 September and 2 and 3 October 2012.

Team 1	Score	Team 2
26 September 2012
USV Eschen/Mauren II	1−4	FC Schaan
FC Ruggell	0−0 (a.e.t.) (5−3 p)	FC Schaan Azzurri
2 October 2012
FC Vaduz II	0−3	FC Ruggell II
3 October 2012
FC Triesen	2−1	FC Balzers II

== Quarter-finals ==
The four winners of the Second Round entered the quarter-finals, along with the semifinalists from last season's competitions: FC Vaduz, USV Eschen/Mauren, FC Balzers and FC Triesenberg. The games were played on 6 November 2012.

Team 1	Score	Team 2
6 November 2012
FC Ruggell II	0−5	FC Triesenberg
7 November 2012
FC Ruggell	0−2	FC Balzers
FC Schaan	0−3	FC Vaduz
FC Triesen	0−5	USV Eschen/Mauren

== Semi-finals ==
The four winners of the quarter-finals competed in the semi-finals. The games will be played on 30 March and 17 April 2013.

Team 1	Score	Team 2
30 March 2013
FC Balzers	2−0	FC Triesenberg
17 April 2013
USV Eschen/Mauren	0−2	FC Vaduz

== Final ==
The final was played in the national stadium, Rheinpark Stadion.

1 May 2013
17:00 CEST

FC Balzers	1–1 (a.e.t.)	FC Vaduz
Akyer 30'		Afonso 22'
Penalties
Quintans (penalty missed); T. Beck (penalty missed); Gubser (penalty missed)	0–3	(penalty scored) Tighazoui; (penalty scored) Abegglen; (penalty scored) Sara

Rheinpark Stadion, Vaduz
Attendance: 1,300
Referee: Nikolaj Hänni (Switzerland)
