= 1994–95 Liechtenstein Cup =

Tournament details
- Country: Liechtenstein

Final positions
- Champions: FC Vaduz
- Runners-up: USV Eschen/Mauren

The 1994–95 Liechtenstein Cup was the fifteenth season of Liechtenstein's annual cup competition. Seven clubs competed with a total of fourteen teams for one spot in the qualifying round of the UEFA Cup Winners' Cup. FC Schaan were the defending champions.

== First round ==
Team 1	Score	Team 2
FC Balzers II	2–3	USV Eschen/Mauren
FC Schaan II	0–4	FC Triesenberg
FC Triesenberg II	0–9	FC Balzers
FC Vaduz II	2–2 (a.e.t.) (4–3 p)	FC Ruggell
USV Eschen/Mauren II	0–7	FC Triesen
FC Ruggell II	1–5	FC Triesen II

== Quarterfinals ==
Team 1	Score	Team 2
FC Triesen	3–4	FC Balzers
FC Triesenberg	3–4	FC Vaduz
FC Triesen II	0–6	FC Schaan
FC Vaduz II	1–6	USV Eschen/Mauren

== Semifinals ==
Team 1	Score	Team 2
FC Schaan	3–5	USV Eschen/Mauren
FC Vaduz	3–1	FC Balzers

== Final ==
25 May 1995

FC Vaduz	3–1	USV Eschen/Mauren
Matt 77', 81'; Polverino 78'		Klaunzer 8'

Sportanlage Blumenau, Triesen
Attendance: 1,630
