= 1998–99 Liechtenstein Cup =

Tournament details
- Country: Liechtenstein

Final positions
- Champions: FC Vaduz
- Runners-up: FC Balzers

The 1998–99 Liechtenstein Cup was the fifty-fourth season of Liechtenstein's annual cup competition. Seven clubs competed with a total of sixteen teams for one spot in the qualifying round of the UEFA Cup. Defending champions were FC Vaduz, who have won the cup continuously since the previous season.

== First round ==
Team 1	Score	Team 2
FC Balzers II	0–4	FC Schaan
FC Schaan II	0–12	FC Vaduz
USV Eschen/Mauren II	1–2	FC Vaduz Portuguese
FC Triesen Español	2–5	FC Vaduz II
FC Schaan Azzurri	0–2	FC Balzers
FC Triesen	3–1	FC Ruggell
FC Triesenberg II	1–8	USV Eschen/Mauren
FC Triesenberg	4–0	FC Ruggell II

== Quarterfinals ==
Team 1	Score	Team 2
FC Vaduz II	0–8	USV Eschen/Mauren
FC Vaduz Portuguese	0–3	FC Balzers
FC Triesenberg	0–1	FC Schaan
FC Triesen	2–3	FC Vaduz

== Semifinals ==
Team 1	Score	Team 2
FC Schaan	1–3	FC Balzers
FC Vaduz	5–1	USV Eschen/Mauren

== Final ==
13 May 1999

FC Vaduz	3–2	FC Balzers
Hasler 9'; Polverino 73', 81'		Büchel 20'; Riederer 44'

Rheinpark Stadion, Vaduz
Attendance: 2,100
