= 1995–96 Liechtenstein Cup =

Tournament details
- Country: Liechtenstein

Final positions
- Champions: FC Vaduz
- Runners-up: USV Eschen/Mauren

The 1995–96 Liechtenstein Cup was the fifty-first season of Liechtenstein's annual cup competition. Seven clubs competed with a total of fourteen teams for one spot in the qualifying round of the UEFA Cup Winners' Cup. FC Vaduz were the defending champions.

== First round ==
Team 1	Score	Team 2
FC Ruggell II	0–3 (f)	FC Triesen II
FC Balzers II	0–2	FC Triesenberg
FC Triesenberg II	0–5	FC Schaan
USV Eschen/Mauren II	0–9	FC Balzers
FC Schaan II	3–0 (f)	FC Ruggell
FC Vaduz II	1–0	FC Triesen

== Quarterfinals ==
Team 1	Score	Team 2
FC Triesenberg II	0–4	USV Eschen/Mauren
FC Vaduz II	1–4	FC Schaan
FC Schaan II	0–8	FC Balzers
FC Triesenberg	0–6	FC Vaduz

== Semifinals ==
Team 1	Score	Team 2
FC Vaduz	3–2	FC Balzers
USV Eschen/Mauren	3–2	FC Schaan

== Final ==
16 May 1996

FC Vaduz	1–0	USV Eschen/Mauren
Pérez 46'

Sportanlage Blumenau, Triesen
Attendance: 650
