= 2004–05 Liechtenstein Cup =

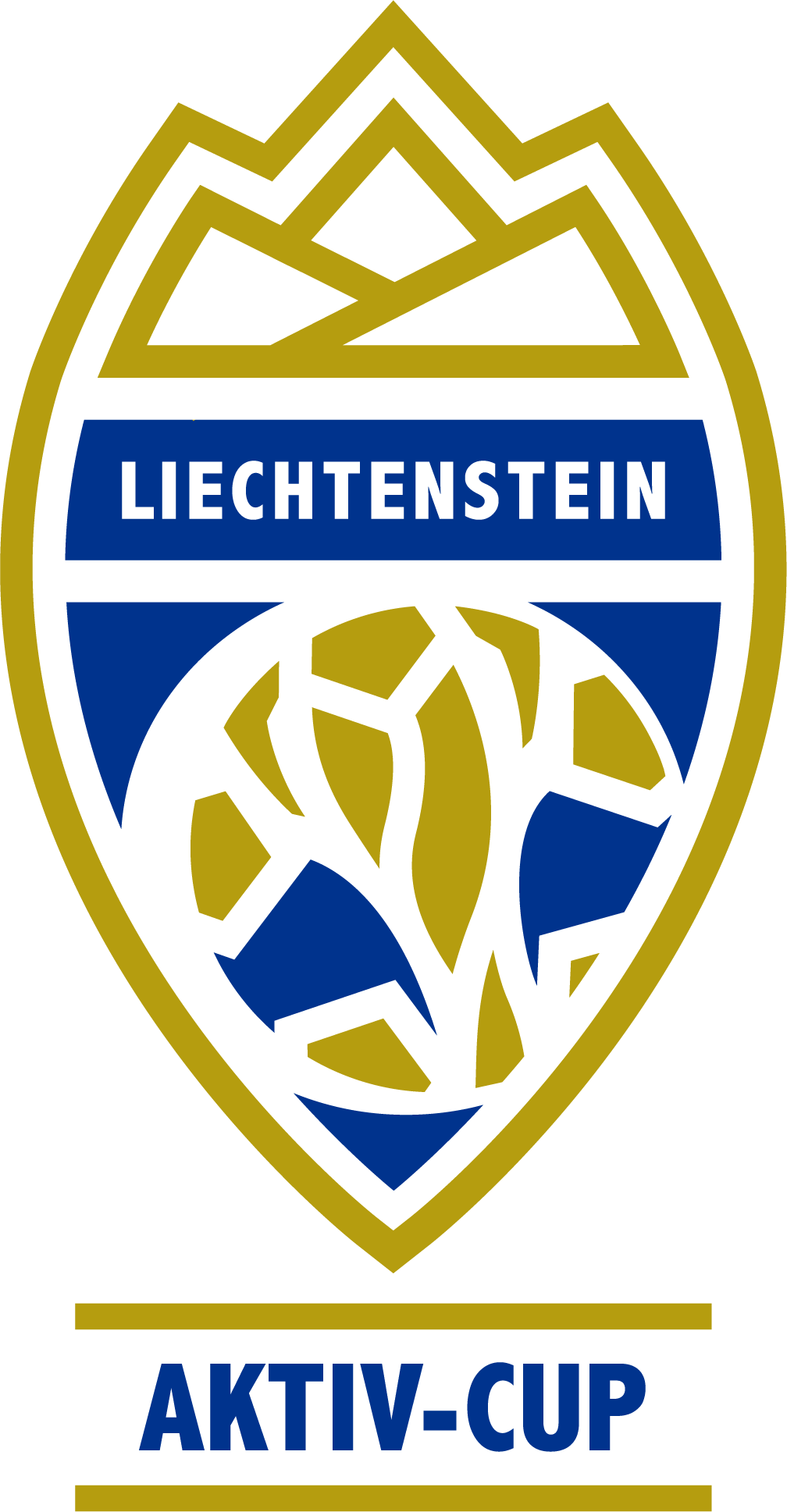
- Logo of the Cup competition of the Liechtenstein Football Association

Tournament details
- Country: Liechtenstein

Final positions
- Champions: FC Vaduz
- Runners-up: USV Eschen/Mauren

The 2004–05 Liechtenstein Cup was the sixteenth season of Liechtenstein's annual cup competition. Seven clubs competed with a total of sixteen teams for one spot in the first qualifying round of the UEFA Cup. Defending champions were FC Vaduz, who have won the cup continuously since 1998.

== Qualifying round ==
Team 1	Score	Team 2
24 August 2004
FC Vaduz III	2–3	FC Triesenberg II

== First round ==
Team 1	Score	Team 2
28 September 2004
USV Eschen/Mauren III	0–9	FC Schaan
FC Schaan II	0–4	FC Ruggell
FC Triesenberg II	0–6	USV Eschen/Mauren
FC Balzers II	1–1 (a.e.t.) (3–0 p)	FC Triesen
FC Triesen II	1–5	USV Eschen/Mauren II
29 September 2004
FC Vaduz II	1–2	FC Triesenberg
FC Ruggell II	0–9	FC Vaduz
FC Schaan III	0–8	FC Balzers

== Quarterfinals ==
Team 1	Score	Team 2
20 October 2004
FC Ruggell	0–3	USV Eschen/Mauren
FC Balzers II	1–8	FC Vaduz
FC Triesenberg	3–0	USV Eschen/Mauren II
26 October 2004
FC Schaan	1–4	FC Balzers

== Semifinals ==
Team 1	Score	Team 2
9 November 2004
FC Triesenberg	2–4	USV Eschen/Mauren
10 November 2004
FC Vaduz	5–1	FC Balzers

== Final ==
5 May 2005

FC Vaduz	4–1	USV Eschen/Mauren
Manojlović 62'; M. Stocklasa 74'; Sumiala 88', 90+1'		Nigg 45+1'

Rheinpark Stadion, Vaduz
Attendance: 1,050
Referee: Valerio Figaroli (Switzerland)
