= 2007–08 Liechtenstein Cup =

Tournament details
- Country: Liechtenstein

Final positions
- Champions: FC Vaduz
- Runners-up: FC Balzers

The 2007–08 Liechtenstein Cup was the sixty-third season of Liechtenstein's annual cup competition. Seven clubs competed with a total of sixteen teams for one spot in the first qualifying round of the UEFA Cup. Defending champions were FC Vaduz, who have won the cup continuously since 1998.

== First round ==
Team 1	Score	Team 2
11 August 2007
FC Ruggell II	0–1	FC Balzers III
FC Triesenberg II	0–6	FC Schaan II
12 August 2007
FC Vaduz III	1–5	FC Triesen
22 August 2007
FC Triesen II	0–2	FC Vaduz II

== Second round ==
Team 1	Score	Team 2
18 September 2007
FC Balzers II	2–1	FC Triesenberg
FC Triesen	0–4	FC Schaan
19 September 2007
FC Balzers III	0–6	FC Schaan II
FC Vaduz II	0–10	FC Balzers

== Quarterfinals ==
Team 1	Score	Team 2
23 October 2007
FC Schaan II	0–5	FC Vaduz
30 October 2007
FC Ruggell	1–0	FC Balzers II
31 October 2007
FC Schaan	1–4	USV Eschen/Mauren
7 November 2007
USV Eschen/Mauren II	0–8	FC Balzers

== Semifinals ==
Team 1	Score	Team 2
1 April 2008
FC Schaan	0–5	FC Vaduz
2 April 2008
USV Eschen/Mauren	0–0 (a.e.t.) (1–3 p)	FC Balzers

== Final ==
1 May 2008

FC Vaduz	4–0	FC Balzers
Grossklaus 27'; Gaspar 37', 59'; Alexandre 81'

Rheinpark Stadion, Vaduz
Attendance: 1,200
Referee: Reto Johann (Liechtenstein)
