= List of Swiss football transfers winter 2015–16 =

This is a list of Swiss football transfers winter 2015–16, only the Swiss Super League and the Swiss Challenge League are included

== Swiss Super League ==
Note: Flags indicate national team as has been defined under FIFA eligibility rules. Players may hold more than one non-FIFA nationality.

=== Basel ===
In:

No.	Pos.	Nation	Player
9	FW	SVN	Andraž Šporar (from (Slovenia) Olimpija)
15	MF	SWE	Alexander Fransson (from (Sweden) Norrköping)
24	MF	SUI	Renato Steffen (from (Switzerland) Young Boys)

Out:

No.	Pos.	Nation	Player
11	MF	ALB	Shkëlzen Gashi (to (United States) Colorado Rapids)
14	FW	JPN	Yoichiro Kakitani (to (Japan) Cerezo Osaka)
15	DF	BUL	Ivan Ivanov (released)
20	MF	SRB	Veljko Simić (on loan to (Switzerland) Schaffhausen)
22	MF	SRB	Zdravko Kuzmanović (on loan to (Italy) Udinese)
23	GK	SUI	Mirko Salvi (on loan to (Switzerland) Lugano)
33	MF	EGY	Mohamed Elneny (to (England) Arsenal)
35	FW	PRK	Pak Kwang-ryong (to (Switzerland) Lausanne)
38	FW	ALB	Albian Ajeti (to (Germany) FC Augsburg)

=== Grasshopper ===
In:

No.	Pos.	Nation	Player
14	DF	SUI	Philippe Senderos (free agent)
17	MF	BUL	Georgi Milanov (on loan from (Russia) CSKA Moscow)
19	FW	SUI	Haris Tabakovic (from (Switzerland) Young Boys)
30	FW	SUI	Shani Tarashaj (on loan from (England) Everton)

Out:

No.	Pos.	Nation	Player
14	MF	FRA	Yoric Ravet (to (Switzerland) Young Boys)
30	FW	SUI	Shani Tarashaj (to (England) Everton)
33	GK	SEN	Timothy Dieng (to (Germany) MSV Duisburg)

=== Lugano ===
In:

No.	Pos.	Nation	Player
7	DF	MKD	Ezgjan Alioski (on loan from (Switzerland) Schaffhausen)
11	FW	SUI	Karim Rossi (from (Italy) Spezia)
23	GK	SUI	Mirko Salvi (on loan from (Switzerland) Basel)

Out:

No.	Pos.	Nation	Player
7	FW	SUI	Patrick Rossini (on loan to (Switzerland) Aarau)
30	GK	ITA	Francesco Russo (on loan to (Switzerland) Aarau)
31	DF	KOS	Denis Markaj (loan return to (Switzerland) Aarau)
36	MF	ITA	Alessandro Mastalli (loan return to (Italy) Milan)

=== Luzern ===
In:

No.	Pos.	Nation	Player
20	MF	SUI	Christian Schneuwly (from (Switzerland) Zürich)
77	MF	GER	Markus Neumayr (from (Liechtenstein) Vaduz)

Out:

No.	Pos.	Nation	Player
17	FW	PAR	Dario Lezcano (to (Germany) FC Ingolstadt 04)
26	MF	SUI	Remo Freuler (to (Italy) Atalanta)

=== Sion ===
In:

No.	Pos.	Nation	Player
16	GK	RUS	Anton Mitryushkin (from (Russia) Spartak Moscow)
45	FW	SVK	Lukáš Čmelík (on loan from (Slovakia) MŠK Žilina)

Out:

No.	Pos.	Nation	Player
6	MF	CIV	Xavier Kouassi (to (United States) New England Revolution)

=== St. Gallen ===
In:

No.	Pos.	Nation	Player
28	MF	GER	Gianluca Gaudino (on loan from (Germany) Bayern Munich)
29	DF	FRA	Florent Hanin (free agent)

Out:

No.	Pos.	Nation	Player
5	MF	BRA	Everton Luiz (to (Serbia) Partizan)
31	MF	SRB	Dejan Janjatović (to (Liechtenstein) Vaduz)

=== Thun ===
In:

No.	Pos.	Nation	Player

Out:

No.	Pos.	Nation	Player

=== Vaduz ===
In:

No.	Pos.	Nation	Player
20	FW	ALB	Armando Sadiku (on loan from (Switzerland) Zürich)
37	MF	SRB	Dejan Janjatović (from (Switzerland) St. Gallen)

Out:

No.	Pos.	Nation	Player
12	MF	SUI	Ramon Cecchini (on loan to (Switzerland) Winterthur)
23	MF	GER	Markus Neumayr (to (Switzerland) Luzern)

=== Young Boys ===
In:

No.	Pos.	Nation	Player
10	MF	FRA	Yoric Ravet (from (Switzerland) Grasshopper)
17	DF	SUI	Benjamin Kololli (on loan from (Switzerland) Biel-Bienne)
44	FW	AUT	Philipp Zulechner (on loan from (Germany) SC Freiburg)

Out:

No.	Pos.	Nation	Player
2	DF	VEN	David González (to (Spain) Huesca)
11	MF	SUI	Renato Steffen (to (Switzerland) Basel)
31	FW	SUI	Haris Tabakovic (to (Switzerland) Grasshopper)
77	FW	GHA	Samuel Afum (on loan to (Switzerland) Neuchâtel Xamax)

=== Zürich ===
In:

No.	Pos.	Nation	Player
5	DF	ARG	Leonardo Sánchez (from (Argentina) Unión)
72	FW	RUS	Aleksandr Kerzhakov (on loan from (Russia) Zenit)

Out:

No.	Pos.	Nation	Player
5	DF	ALB	Berat Djimsiti (to (Italy) Atalanta)
7	FW	SUI	Mario Gavranović (to (Croatia) Rijeka)
8	MF	SUI	Christian Schneuwly (to (Switzerland) Luzern)
11	FW	ALB	Armando Sadiku (on loan to (Liechtenstein) Vaduz)

== Swiss Challenge League ==
Note: Flags indicate national team as has been defined under FIFA eligibility rules. Players may hold more than one non-FIFA nationality.

=== Aarau ===
In:

No.	Pos.	Nation	Player
11	FW	SUI	Zoran Josipovic (on loan from (Italy) Juventus)
47	FW	SUI	Patrick Rossini (on loan from (Switzerland) Lugano)
81	GK	ITA	Francesco Russo (on loan from (Switzerland) Lugano)
—	DF	KOS	Denis Markaj (loan return from (Switzerland) Lugano)

Out:

No.	Pos.	Nation	Player

=== Biel-Bienne ===
In:

No.	Pos.	Nation	Player

Out:

No.	Pos.	Nation	Player
20	DF	SUI	Benjamin Kololli (on loan to (Switzerland) Young Boys)

=== Chiasso ===
In:

No.	Pos.	Nation	Player

Out:

No.	Pos.	Nation	Player
92	FW	USA	Giuseppe Gentile (to (United States) Fort Lauderdale Strikers)

=== Lausanne-Sport ===
In:

No.	Pos.	Nation	Player
—	FW	PRK	Pak Kwang-ryong (from (Switzerland) Basel)
—	FW	URU	Kevin Méndez (on loan from (Italy) Roma)

Out:

No.	Pos.	Nation	Player

=== Le Mont ===
In:

No.	Pos.	Nation	Player

Out:

No.	Pos.	Nation	Player

=== Neuchâtel Xamax ===
In:

No.	Pos.	Nation	Player
—	FW	GHA	Samuel Afum (on loan from (Switzerland) Young Boys)

Out:

No.	Pos.	Nation	Player

=== Schaffhausen ===
In:

No.	Pos.	Nation	Player
16	MF	SRB	Veljko Simić (on loan from (Switzerland) Basel)

Out:

No.	Pos.	Nation	Player
3	DF	MKD	Ezgjan Alioski (on loan to (Switzerland) Lugano)

=== Wil ===
In:

No.	Pos.	Nation	Player

Out:

No.	Pos.	Nation	Player

=== Winterthur ===
In:

No.	Pos.	Nation	Player
—	MF	SUI	Ramon Cecchini (on loan from (Liechtenstein) Vaudz)

Out:

No.	Pos.	Nation	Player

=== Wohlen ===
In:

No.	Pos.	Nation	Player

Out:

No.	Pos.	Nation	Player
