= 2002–03 Liechtenstein Cup =

Tournament details
- Country: Liechtenstein

Final positions
- Champions: FC Vaduz
- Runners-up: FC Balzers

The 2002–03 Liechtenstein Cup was the fifty-eighth season of Liechtenstein's annual cup competition. Seven clubs competed with a total of sixteen teams for one spot in the qualifying round of the UEFA Cup. Defending champions were FC Vaduz, who have won the cup continuously since 1998.

== First round ==
Team 1	Score	Team 2
24 September 2002
FC Schaan II	1–5	FC Vaduz II
FC Ruggell II	1–5	FC Schaan
25 September 2002
FC Vaduz III	0–15	USV Eschen/Mauren
FC Schaan Azzurri	0–11	FC Vaduz
1 October 2002
FC Triesen II	2–8	FC Balzers
FC Triesenberg II	1–5	FC Triesen
2 October 2002
FC Balzers II	4–2	FC Ruggell
USV Eschen/Mauren II	4–2	FC Triesenberg

== Quarterfinals ==
Team 1	Score	Team 2
22 October 2002
FC Balzers II	0–6	FC Balzers
USV Eschen/Mauren II	3–0	FC Vaduz II
FC Triesen	5–6	USV Eschen/Mauren
6 November 2002
FC Schaan	0–5	FC Vaduz

== Semifinals ==
Team 1	Score	Team 2
8 April 2003
FC Balzers	1–0	USV Eschen/Mauren II
21 April 2003
USV Eschen/Mauren	1–7	FC Vaduz

== Final ==
1 June 2003

FC Balzers	0–6	FC Vaduz
		Beck 10', 17', 35', 75' (pen.), 90'; M. Polverino 45'

Rheinpark Stadion, Vaduz
Attendance: 1,000
Referee: Dieter Schoch (Switzerland)
