= 2013–14 Liechtenstein Cup =

Tournament details
- Country: Liechtenstein
- Teams: 18

Final positions
- Champions: FC Vaduz
- Runners-up: USV Eschen/Mauren

Tournament statistics
- Matches played: 17
- Goals scored: 76 (4.47 per match)

The 2013–14 Liechtenstein Cup is the 69th season of Liechtenstein's annual cup competition. Seven clubs compete with a total of 18 teams for one spot in the first qualifying round of the 2014–15 UEFA Europa League. FC Vaduz are the defending champions.

== Participating clubs ==
2013–14 Challenge League (2nd tier)	2013–14 1. Liga Classic (4th tier)	2013-14 Regional league (6th tier)	2013-14 Regional league (7th tier)	2013-14 Regional league (8th tier)	2013-14 Regional league (9th tier)
FC Vaduz	FC Balzers; USV Eschen/Mauren	FC Schaan; FC Triesenberg	FC Balzers II; FC Ruggell; FC Triesen; FC Vaduz U23	USV Eschen/Mauren II; FC Schaan Azzurri; FC Triesen II	FC Balzers III; USV Eschen/Mauren III; FC Ruggell II; FC Schaan II; FC Triesenberg II; FC Vaduz III

== First round ==
The First Round featured twelve teams. The games were played on 20, 21 and 28 August 2013.

Team 1	Score	Team 2
20 August 2013
FC Balzers III	2–1	USV Eschen/Mauren II
USV Eschen/Mauren III	5–2	FC Vaduz III
21 August 2013
FC Ruggell II	0–2	FC Triesen II
FC Triesenberg II	2–4	FC Schaan Azzurri
FC Schaan II	0–4	FC Triesen
28 August 2013
FC Balzers II	2–0	FC Vaduz U23

== Second round ==
The six winners of the First Round, along with FC Schaan and FC Ruggell competed in the Second Round. The games were played on 1 and 2 October 2013.

Team 1	Score	Team 2
1 October 2013
FC Balzers III	2–3	FC Schaan Azzurri
2 October 2013
FC Triesen	1–2 (a.e.t.)	FC Ruggell
FC Balzers II	0–3	FC Schaan
USV Eschen/Mauren III	4–3	FC Triesen II

== Quarterfinals ==
The four winners of the Second Round, along with FC Vaduz, USV Eschen/Mauren, FC Balzers and FC Triesenberg competed in the quarterfinals. The games were played on 5 and 12 November 2013.

Team 1	Score	Team 2
29 October 2013
USV Eschen/Mauren III	0–1	FC Schaan Azzurri
30 October 2013
FC Schaan	0–6	FC Vaduz
5 November 2013
USV Eschen/Mauren	4–1	FC Balzers
6 November 2013
FC Ruggell	2–1	FC Triesenberg

== Semifinals ==
Team 1	Score	Team 2
8 April 2014
FC Schaan Azzurri	0−5	USV Eschen/Mauren
9 April 2014
FC Ruggell	0−8	FC Vaduz

== Final ==
1 May 2014
17:00

FC Vaduz	6–0	USV Eschen/Mauren
Schürpf 35'; Hasler 43'; Abegglen 60' 68'; Cecchini 80'; Pak 83'	Report

Rheinpark Stadion, Vaduz
Attendance: 1,330
Referee: San Fedayi (Switzerland)
