= 2008–09 Liechtenstein Cup =

Tournament details
- Country: Liechtenstein

Final positions
- Champions: FC Vaduz
- Runners-up: USV Eschen/Mauren

The 2008–09 Liechtenstein Cup was the sixty-fourth season of Liechtenstein's annual cup competition. Seven clubs competed with a total of eighteen teams for one spot in the second qualifying round of the UEFA Europa League. Defending champions were FC Vaduz, who have won the cup continuously since 1998.

== First round ==
The First Round featured fourteen teams. The only first team of a club that had to compete in this round was FC Triesen, while the other two teams eligible for the first round, FC Triesenberg and FC Schaan, received a bye. The games were played on August 26 – 28, 2008.

Team 1	Score	Team 2
26 August 2008
FC Vaduz Portuguese	1–8	FC Balzers II
FC Triesen	3–4	USV Echen/Mauren II
27 August 2008
USV Eschen/Mauren III	0–6	FC Vaduz II
FC Triesenberg II	5–0	FC Balzers III
FC Triesen III	1–5	FC Schaan Azurri
28 August 2008
FC Triesen II	0–2	FC Ruggell II

== Second round ==
The six winners of the First Round, along with the two teams who had received a bye, competed in the Second Round. The first teams of FC Balzers, USV Eschen/Mauren, FC Ruggell and FC Vaduz were all given a bye in this round. The games were played on September 17 and 19, 2008.

Team 1	Score	Team 2
17 September 2008
FC Triesenberg II	1–6	FC Schaan Azzurri
FC Vaduz II	3–0 (f)	USV Eschen/Mauren II
FC Ruggell II	1–12	FC Schaan
19 September 2008
FC Triesenberg	2–5	FC Balzers II

== Quarterfinals ==
The four winners of the Second Round, along with the four teams who had received a bye, competed in the Quarterfinals. The games were played on October 21, 22, 28 and 29, 2008.

Team 1	Score	Team 2
21 October 2008
FC Ruggell	0–5	USV Eschen/Mauren
22 October 2008
FC Balzers II	0–8	FC Vaduz
28 October 2008
FC Schaan Azurri	0–1	FC Balzers
29 October 2008
FC Vaduz II	0–8	FC Schaan

== Semifinals ==
The four winners of the Quarterfinals competed in the Semifinals. The games were played on April 28 and 29, 2009.

Team 1	Score	Team 2
28 April 2009
FC Schaan	0–5	USV Eschen/Mauren
29 April 2009
FC Balzers	0–5	FC Vaduz

== Final ==
The Final was played on May 21, 2009 at Rheinpark Stadion, Vaduz.

21 May 2009

FC Vaduz	2–1	USV Eschen/Mauren
Rudan 39'; Fischer 45'		Memeti 67'

Rheinpark Stadion, Vaduz
Attendance: 1,935
Referee: Nikolaj Hänni (Switzerland)
