= Liechtensteiner Footballer of the Year =

The Liechtensteiner Footballer of the Year is an award granted every season to a Liechtensteiner footballer. It is awarded by the country's Liechtensteiner Vaterland newspaper, and was first awarded in 1981. In 2008, Gaspar Odirlei became the first non-Liechtensteiner to win the award. In 2022, there was a Women's footballer of the year award for the first time.

== Winners (Men) ==
Year	Winner	Club
1980–81	Branko Eškinja	(Liechtenstein) FC Vaduz
1981–82	Manfred Frick	(Liechtenstein) FC Balzers
1982–83	Branko Eškinja	(Liechtenstein) FC Vaduz
1983–84	Georges Rudics	(Liechtenstein) FC Balzers
1984–85	Roland Moser	(Liechtenstein) FC Vaduz
1985–86	Roland Moser	(Liechtenstein) FC Vaduz
1986–87	Harry Schädler	(Liechtenstein) FC Vaduz
1987–88	Manfred Büchel	(Liechtenstein) FC Schaan
1988–89	Manfred Büchel	(Liechtenstein) FC Schaan
1989–90	Manfred Frick	(Liechtenstein) FC Balzers
1990–91	Roger Zech	(Liechtenstein) USV Eschen/Mauren
1991–92	Martin Oehri	(Liechtenstein) FC Vaduz
1992–93	Martin Heeb	(Liechtenstein) FC Schaan
1993–94	Mario Frick	(Liechtenstein) FC Balzers
1994–95	Roland Moser; Martin Heeb	(Liechtenstein) USV Eschen/Mauren (Liechtenstein) FC Schaan
1995–96	Harry Zech	(Liechtenstein) FC Vaduz
1996–97	Daniel Hasler	(Liechtenstein) FC Vaduz
1997–98	Martin Stocklasa	(Liechtenstein) FC Vaduz
1998–99	Mario Frick	(Switzerland) FC Basel
1999–2000	Martin Stocklasa	(Switzerland) FC Zurich
2000–01	Daniel Hasler	(Switzerland) FC Wil
2001–02	Mario Frick	(Italy) Hellas Verona
2002–03	Daniel Hasler	(Switzerland) FC Wil
2003–04	Benjamin Fischer	(Liechtenstein) FC Vaduz
2004–05	Thomas Beck	(Switzerland) FC Chiasso
2005–06	Franz Burgmeier	(Switzerland) FC Aarau
2006–07	Mario Frick	(Italy) Siena
2007–08	Gaspar Odirlei	(Liechtenstein) FC Vaduz
2009	Martin Stocklasa	(Austria) SV Ried
2010	Martin Stocklasa	(Austria) SV Ried
2011	Martin Stocklasa	(Switzerland) FC St. Gallen
2012	Michele Polverino	(Austria) Wolfsberger AC
2013	Michele Polverino	(Austria) Wolfsberger AC
2014	Peter Jehle	(Liechtenstein) FC Vaduz
2015	Nicolas Hasler	(Liechtenstein) FC Vaduz
2016	Peter Jehle	(Liechtenstein) FC Vaduz
2017	Nicolas Hasler	(Liechtenstein) FC Vaduz | (Canada) Toronto FC
2018	Nicolas Hasler	(United States) Chicago Fire
2019	Dennis Salanovic	(Switzerland) FC Thun
2020-21	Not awarded	N/A
2022	Benjamin Büchel	(Liechtenstein) FC Vaduz
2023	Benjamin Büchel	(Liechtenstein) FC Vaduz
2024	Benjamin Büchel	(Liechtenstein) FC Vaduz
2025	Nicolas Hasler	(Liechtenstein) FC Vaduz

== Winners (Women) ==
Year	Winner	Club
2022	Fiona Batliner	(Switzerland) FC St. Gallen
2023	Fiona Batliner	(Switzerland) FC St. Gallen
2024	Fiona Batliner	(Switzerland) FC St. Gallen
2025	Lena Göppel	(Germany) SV Meppen

== Club Winners (Men) ==
Club	Won
(Liechtenstein) FC Vaduz	19
(Liechtenstein) FC Balzers	4
(Liechtenstein) FC Schaan	4
(Liechtenstein) USV Eschen/Mauren	2
(Austria) SV Ried	2
(Austria) Wolfsberger AC	2
(Switzerland) FC Wil	2
(Switzerland) FC Basel	1
(Switzerland) FC Zürich	1
(Switzerland) FC Chiasso	1
(Switzerland) FC Aarau	1
(Switzerland) FC St.Gallen	1
(Italy) Hellas Verona F.C.	1
(Italy) S.S. Robur Siena	1
(Canada) Toronto FC	1
(United States) Chicago Fire	1
(Switzerland) FC Thun	1
