= 1996–97 Liechtenstein Cup =

Tournament details
- Country: Liechtenstein

Final positions
- Champions: FC Balzers
- Runners-up: FC Vaduz

The 1996–97 Liechtenstein Cup was the fifty-second season of Liechtenstein's annual cup competition. Seven clubs competed with a total of fourteen teams for one spot in the qualifying round of the UEFA Cup Winners' Cup. FC Vaduz were the defending champions.

== First round ==
Team 1	Score	Team 2
FC Ruggell	0–2	FC Triesen
FC Triesenberg II	2–0	USV Eschen/Mauren II
FC Triesen	0–8	FC Balzers
FC Vaduz II	2–5	FC Schaan
FC Triesenberg	1–4	USV Eschen/Mauren
FC Ruggell II	2–0	FC Schaan Azzurri

== Quarterfinals ==
Team 1	Score	Team 2
FC Triesenberg II	0–7	FC Balzers
FC Ruggell II	0–14	FC Vaduz
FC Balzers II	1–3	USV Eschen/Mauren
FC Schaan	0–2	FC Triesen

== Semifinals ==
Team 1	Score	Team 2
FC Triesen	1–2	FC Vaduz
USV Eschen/Mauren	4–4 (a.e.t.) (1–3 p)	FC Balzers

== Final ==
8 May 1997

FC Balzers	3–2 (a.e.t.)	FC Vaduz
D. Frick 46'; M. Frick 108', 113'		Daumantas 75'; Hasler 103' (pen.)

Sportanlage Blumenau, Triesen
Attendance: 1,300
Referee: Serge Muhmenthaler (Switzerland)
