= 1992–93 Liechtenstein Cup =

Tournament details
- Country: Liechtenstein

Final positions
- Champions: FC Balzers
- Runners-up: FC Schaan

The 1992–93 Liechtenstein Cup was the forty-eighth season of Liechtenstein's annual cup competition. Seven clubs competed with a total of sixteen teams for one spot in the qualifying round of the Cup Winners' Cup. FC Vaduz were the defending champions.

== First round ==
Team 1	Score	Team 2
FC Ruggell II	0–10	FC Triesenberg
FC Triesen II	2–7	FC Schaan
FC Schaan II	0–5	FC Balzers
FC Balzers II	1–4	USV Eschen/Mauren
USV Eschen/Mauren II	0–2	FC Vaduz
FC Triesenberg II	1–7	FC Schaan Azzurri
FC Vaduz II	1–1 (a.e.t.) (3–5 p)	FC Triesen
FC Triesen Español	1–3	FC Ruggell

== Quarterfinals ==
Team 1	Score	Team 2
FC Ruggell	1–4	FC Schaan
FC Schaan Azzurri	1–10	USV Eschen/Mauren
FC Triesen	1–2	FC Vaduz
FC Triesenberg	0–5	FC Balzers

== Semifinals ==
Team 1	Score	Team 2
USV Eschen/Mauren	0–1	FC Balzers
FC Vaduz	1–2	FC Schaan

== Final ==
20 May 1993

FC Balzers	5–2 (a.e.t.)	FC Schaan

Freizeitpark Widau, Ruggell
