= 1993–94 Liechtenstein Cup =

Tournament details
- Country: Liechtenstein

Final positions
- Champions: FC Schaan
- Runners-up: FC Balzers

The 1993–94 Liechtenstein Cup was the forty-ninth season of Liechtenstein's annual cup competition. Seven clubs competed with a total of sixteen teams for one spot in the qualifying round of the UEFA Cup Winners' Cup. FC Balzers were the defending champions. As of 2025, this is the last tournament in which the final didn't involve FC Vaduz.

== First round ==
Team 1	Score	Team 2
FC Schaan Azzurri	1–5	FC Triesenberg
FC Vaduz II	2–1	FC Triesen
FC Triesenberg II	4–6	FC Vaduz
FC Triesen Español	1–2	FC Schaan
FC Schaan II	0–14	USV Eschen/Mauren
USV Eschen/Mauren II	2–0	FC Ruggell
FC Ruggell II	0–7	FC Balzers
FC Triesen II	2–3	FC Balzers II

== Quarterfinals ==
Team 1	Score	Team 2
FC Balzers II	0–2	FC Vaduz
FC Vaduz II	0–3	FC Balzers
USV Eschen/Mauren II	2–4	FC Schaan
FC Triesenberg	5–2	USV Eschen/Mauren

== Semifinals ==
Team 1	Score	Team 2
FC Triesenberg	0–2	FC Balzers
FC Vaduz	1–1 (a.e.t.) (4–5 p)	FC Schaan

== Final ==
12 May 1994

FC Schaan	3–0	FC Balzers
Nikolić 3'; Peischl 86' (pen.); Kindle 89'

Sportpark Eschen-Mauren, Eschen
