= Mathias Sele =

Liechtenstein footballer

Personal information
- Full name: Mathias Sele
- Date of birth: 28 May 1992 (age 34)
- Height: 1.77 m (5 ft 9 1/2 in)
- Position: Midfielder

Youth career
- 2005–2010: FC Balzers

Senior career*
Years	Team	Apps	(Gls)
2010–2013	FC Balzers	27	(2)
2013–2015	FC Triesenberg	0	(0)
2015–2018	USV Eschen/Mauren	56	(2)
2018–2019	FC Balzers	12	(0)
2019–2025	FC Schaan	0	(0)

International career^{‡}
2011–2014	Liechtenstein U21	14	(0)
2015–2017	Liechtenstein	6	(0)
- * Club domestic league appearances and goals as of 6 June 2026 ‡ National team caps and goals as of 14 December 2017

Mathias Sele (born 28 May 1992) is a former Liechtensteiner footballer who last played for FC Schaan.

== International career ==
He was a member of the Liechtenstein national football team, making his debut in a UEFA Euro 2016 qualifying match against Russia on 8 September 2015. Sele also made 14 appearances for the Liechtenstein U21 team between 2011 and 2014.
