= Markaj =

Markaj is an Albanian surname, derived from the given name Mark. Notable people with the surname include:

- Denis Markaj (born 1991), Kosovar footballer of Swiss–Albanian descent
- Mario Markaj (born 1995), Albanian football midfielder
