= Rafael Grünenfelder =

Liechtenstein footballer (born 1999)

Personal information
- Date of birth: 20 March 1999 (age 27)
- Place of birth: Vaduz, Liechtenstein
- Position: Defender

Team information
- Current team: Triesen
- Number: 4

Youth career
- –2014: Balzers
- 2014–2017: Vaduz
- 2017–2018: Balzers

Senior career*
Years	Team	Apps	(Gls)
2017–2023	Balzers	60	(1)
2023–	Triesen	0	(0)

International career^{‡}
2013–2014	Liechtenstein U17	6	(0)
2015–2017	Liechtenstein U19	9	(0)
2017–2020	Liechtenstein U21	13	(0)
2021–	Liechtenstein	16	(0)
- * Club domestic league appearances and goals as of 1 June 2024 ‡ National team caps and goals as of 26 September 2022

Rafael Grünenfelder (born 20 March 1999) is a Liechtensteiner footballer who plays as a defender for Triesen and the Liechtenstein national team.

== Career ==
Grünenfelder made his international debut for Liechtenstein on 25 March 2021 in a 2022 FIFA World Cup qualification match against Armenia.

== Personal life ==
Grünenfelder was born in Vaduz, and also holds Swiss citizenship.

== Career statistics ==
=== International ===
As of 26 September 2022

Liechtenstein
Year	Apps	Goals
2021	9	0
2022	7	0
Total	16	0
