= Hobi =

Hobi may refer to:

- Thomas Hobi
- Hobi al-wahid
- HOBIS
- Age Jodi Jantam Tui Hobi Por
