= Jonas Hilti =

Liechtensteiner footballer (born 2000)

Personal information
- Full name: Jonas Hilti
- Date of birth: 22 March 2000 (age 26)
- Place of birth: Liechtenstein
- Position: Defender

Team information
- Current team: Ruggell

Youth career
- 2015–2018: Schaan
- 2018–2019: Vaduz

Senior career*
Years	Team	Apps	(Gls)
2019–2023	Vaduz II		
2023–	Ruggell		

International career^{‡}
2015–2016	Liechtenstein U17	4	(0)
2016–2018	Liechtenstein U19	7	(0)
2018–2022	Liechtenstein U21	17	(0)
2022–	Liechtenstein	1	(0)
- * Club domestic league appearances and goals as of 1 June 2024 ‡ National team caps and goals as of 21 November 2022

Jonas Hilti (born 22 March 2000) is a Liechtensteiner footballer who currently plays for Ruggell.

== International career ==
He is a member of the Liechtenstein national football team, having made his debut in a 2022–23 UEFA Nations League match against Moldova on 25 September 2022. Hilti also made 17 appearances for the Liechtenstein U21.
