= Niklas Beck =

Liechtenstein footballer

Personal information
- Date of birth: 25 March 2001 (age 25)
- Place of birth: Vaduz, Liechtenstein
- Height: 1.84 m (6 ft 0 in)
- Position: Centre-back

Team information
- Current team: Balzers
- Number: 3

Youth career
- –2013: Triesenberg
- 2013–2019: Vaduz

Senior career*
Years	Team	Apps	(Gls)
2019–2021	Eschen/Mauren		
2020–2021	→ Ruggell (loan)		
2021–2022	Vaduz II		
2023–2024	Eschen/Mauren	13	(0)
2024–	Balzers	45	(2)

International career^{‡}
2016–2017	Liechtenstein U17	5	(0)
2017–2018	Liechtenstein U19	4	(0)
2019–	Liechtenstein U21	17	(0)
2021–	Liechtenstein	30	(0)
- * Club domestic league appearances and goals as of 14:02, 6 June 2026 (UTC) ‡ National team caps and goals as of 16:22, 16 November 2026 (UTC)

Niklas Beck (born 25 March 2001) is a Liechtensteiner footballer who plays as a centre-back for Balzers and the Liechtenstein national team.

== Career ==
Beck made his international debut for Liechtenstein on 25 March 2021 in a 2022 FIFA World Cup qualification match against Armenia.

== Career statistics ==
=== International ===
As of 16 November 2026

Liechtenstein
Year	Apps	Goals
2021	1	0
2022	7	0
2023	9	0
2024	7	0
2025	2	0
2026	4	0
Total	30	0
