= Zirnis =

Origin
- Origin: Latvian
- Meaning: "pea"

Zirnis (feminine: Ābola) is a Latvian surname, derived from the Latvian word for "pea". Individuals with the surname include:

- Dzintars Zirnis (born 1977), Latvian footballer
- Kārlis Zirnis (born 1977), Latvian ice hockey player and coach
