= UEFA Euro 2008 qualifying Group F =

Standings and results for Group F of the UEFA Euro 2008 qualifying tournament.

Spain secured qualification to the tournament proper on 17 November 2007 following a 3–0 win against Sweden, becoming the tenth team in the whole of the qualification stage to do so. Sweden secured qualification to the tournament proper on 21 November 2007 following a 2–1 win against Latvia, becoming the eleventh team in the whole of the qualification stage to do so.

== Standings ==
Pos	Team	Pld	W	D	L	GF	GA	GD	Pts	Qualification	(Spain)	(Sweden)	(Northern Ireland)	(Denmark)	(Latvia)	(Iceland)	(Liechtenstein)
1	Spain	12	9	1	2	23	8	+15	28	Qualify for final tournament	—	3–0	1–0	2–1	2–0	1–0	4–0
2	Sweden	12	8	2	2	23	9	+14	26	Qualify for final tournament	2–0	—	1–1	0–0	2–1	5–0	3–1
3	Northern Ireland	12	6	2	4	17	14	+3	20 (Note: Head-to-head points: Northern Ireland 4, Denmark 1.)		3–2	2–1	—	2–1	1–0	0–3	3–1
4	Denmark	12	6	2	4	21	11	+10	20		1–3	0–3 (Note: The Denmark v Sweden match was abandoned in the 89th minute at 3–3 following a fan attack on the referee. The match was awarded as a 3–0 forfeit win to Sweden by UEFA following a hearing on 8 June 2007.)	0–0	—	3–1	3–0	4–0
5	Latvia	12	4	0	8	15	17	−2	12		0–2	0–1	1–0	0–2	—	4–0	4–1
6	Iceland	12	2	2	8	10	27	−17	8		1–1	1–2	2–1	0–2	2–4	—	1–1
7	Liechtenstein	12	2	1	9	9	32	−23	7		0–2	0–3	1–4	0–4	1–0	3–0	—

Source: UEFA
Rules for classification: Qualification tiebreakers

== Matches ==
Group F fixtures were settled at a meeting between the participants in Copenhagen, Denmark.

2 September 2006
15:00 UTC+1

Northern Ireland	0–3	Iceland
	Report	Þorvaldsson 13'; Hreiðarsson 20'; Guðjohnsen 37'

Windsor Park, Belfast
Attendance: 13,552
Referee: Tommy Skjerven (Norway)
2 September 2006
20:00 UTC+3

Latvia	0–1	Sweden
	Report	Källström 38'

Skonto Stadions, Riga
Attendance: 7,500
Referee: Darko Ceferin (Slovenia)
2 September 2006
22:00 UTC+2

Spain	4–0	Liechtenstein
Torres 20'; Villa 45', 62'; L. García 66'	Report

Estadio Nuevo Vivero, Badajoz
Attendance: 13,876
Referee: Ljubomir Krstevski (Macedonia)

6 September 2006
19:30 UTC+2

Sweden	3–1	Liechtenstein
Allbäck 2', 69'; Rosenberg 89'	Report	M. Frick 27'

Ullevi, Gothenburg
Attendance: 17,735
Referee: Veaceslav Banari (Moldova)
6 September 2006
18:05 UTC+0

Iceland	0–2	Denmark
	Report	Rommedahl 5'; Tomasson 33'

Laugardalsvöllur, Reykjavík
Attendance: 10,007
Referee: Nikolai Ivanov (Russia)
6 September 2006
20:15 UTC+1

Northern Ireland	3–2	Spain
Healy 20', 65', 80'	Report	Xavi 14'; Villa 52'

Windsor Park, Belfast
Attendance: 13,885
Referee: Frank De Bleeckere (Belgium)

7 October 2006
20:00 UTC+2

Denmark	0–0	Northern Ireland
	Report

Parken Stadium, Copenhagen
Attendance: 41,482
Referee: Konrad Plautz (Austria)
7 October 2006
21:00 UTC+3

Latvia	4–0	Iceland
Karlsons 14'; Verpakovskis 15', 25'; Višņakovs 52'	Report

Skonto Stadions, Riga
Attendance: 6,800
Referee: Alan Kelly (Republic of Ireland)
7 October 2006
20:00 UTC+2

Sweden	2–0	Spain
Elmander 10'; Allbäck 82'	Report

Råsunda Stadion, Solna
Attendance: 33,056
Referee: Steve Bennett (England)

11 October 2006
18:05 UTC+0

Iceland	1–2	Sweden
Viðarsson 6'	Report	Källström 8'; Wilhelmsson 59'

Laugardalsvöllur, Reykjavík
Attendance: 8,725
Referee: Grzegorz Gilewski (Poland)
11 October 2006
20:15 UTC+2

Liechtenstein	0–4	Denmark
	Report	D. Jensen 29'; Gravgaard 32'; Tomasson 51', 64'

Rheinpark, Vaduz
Attendance: 2,665
Referee: Ceri Richards (Wales)
11 October 2006
20:00 UTC+1

Northern Ireland	1–0	Latvia
Healy 35'	Report

Windsor Park, Belfast
Attendance: 13,500
Referee: Helmut Fleischer (Germany)

24 March 2007
20:15 UTC+1

Liechtenstein	1–4	Northern Ireland
Burgmeier 90+1'	Report	Healy 52', 75', 83'; McCann 90+2'

Rheinpark, Vaduz
Attendance: 4,340
Referee: Oleh Oriekhov (Ukraine)
24 March 2007
22:00 UTC+1

Spain	2–1	Denmark
Morientes 34'; Villa 45+1'	Report	Gravgaard 49'

Santiago Bernabéu, Madrid
Attendance: 73,575
Referee: Massimo Busacca (Switzerland)

28 March 2007
19:30 UTC+2

Liechtenstein	1–0	Latvia
M. Frick 17'	Report

Rheinpark, Vaduz
Attendance: 1,680
Referee: Serge Gumienny (Belgium)
28 March 2007
19:45 UTC+1

Northern Ireland	2–1	Sweden
Healy 31', 58'	Report	Elmander 26'

Windsor Park, Belfast
Attendance: 13,500
Referee: Eric Braamhaar (Netherlands)
28 March 2007
22:00 UTC+2

Spain	1–0	Iceland
Iniesta 80'	Report

ONO Estadi, Palma de Mallorca
Attendance: 18,326
Referee: Laurent Duhamel (France)

2 June 2007
16:00 UTC+0

Iceland	1–1	Liechtenstein
B. Gunnarsson 27'	Report	Rohrer 69'

Laugardalsvöllur, Reykjavík
Attendance: 5,139
Referee: Sten Kaldma (Estonia)
2 June 2007
20:00 CEST

Denmark	0–3 Awarded (Note: The Denmark v Sweden match was abandoned in the 89th minute with the score at 3–3, following a fan attack on the referee. UEFA awarded the match as a 3–0 forfeit win to Sweden following a hearing on 8 June 2007.)	Sweden
Agger 34'; Tomasson 62'; Andreasen 75'	Report	Elmander 7', 26'; Hansson 23'

Parken Stadium, Copenhagen
Attendance: 42,083
Referee: Herbert Fandel (Germany)
2 June 2007
21:30 UTC+3

Latvia	0–2	Spain
	Report	Villa 45'; Xavi 60'

Skonto Stadions, Riga
Attendance: 10,000
Referee: Craig Thomson (Scotland)

6 June 2007
20:15 UTC+2

Sweden	5–0	Iceland
Allbäck 11', 51'; A. Svensson 42'; Mellberg 45'; Rosenberg 50'	Report

Råsunda Stadion, Solna
Attendance: 33,338
Referee: Alain Hamer (Luxembourg)
6 June 2007
20:30 UTC+2

Liechtenstein	0–2	Spain
	Report	Villa 8', 14'

Rheinpark, Vaduz
Attendance: 5,739
Referee: Nikolai Ivanov (Russia)
6 June 2007
21:30 UTC+3

Latvia	0–2	Denmark
	Report	Rommedahl 15', 17'

Skonto Stadions, Riga
Attendance: 7,500
Referee: Matteo Trefoloni (Italy)

22 August 2007
19:45 UTC+1

Northern Ireland	3–1	Liechtenstein
Healy 5', 35'; Lafferty 56'	Report	M. Frick 89'

Windsor Park, Belfast
Attendance: 13,544
Referee: Radek Matějek (Czech Republic)

8 September 2007
19:15 UTC+3

Latvia	1–0	Northern Ireland
Baird 56' (o.g.)	Report

Skonto Stadions, Riga
Attendance: 7,500
Referee: Pedro Proença (Portugal)
8 September 2007
20:30 UTC+2

Sweden	0–0	Denmark
	Report

Råsunda Stadium, Solna
Attendance: 33,082
Referee: Frank De Bleeckere (Belgium)
8 September 2007
20:00 UTC+0

Iceland	1–1	Spain
Hallfreðsson 40'	Report	Iniesta 86'

Laugardalsvöllur, Reykjavík
Attendance: 9,483
Referee: Wolfgang Stark (Germany)

12 September 2007
20:00 UTC+2

Denmark	4–0	Liechtenstein
Nordstrand 3', 36'; M. Laursen 12'; Tomasson 18'	Report

NRGi Park, Aarhus (Note: Denmark required to play two qualifying games at least 140 km away from Copenhagen as punishment for the abandonment of their previous home match.)
Attendance: 20,005
Referee: Mark Clattenburg (England)
12 September 2007
18:05 UTC+0

Iceland	2–1	Northern Ireland
Björnsson 6'; Gillespie 90+1' (o.g.)	Report	Healy 72' (pen.)

Laugardalsvöllur, Reykjavík
Attendance: 7,727
Referee: Yuri Baskakov (Russia)
12 September 2007
22:00 UTC+2

Spain	2–0	Latvia
Xavi 13'; Torres 86'	Report

Estadio Carlos Tartiere, Oviedo
Attendance: 22,560
Referee: Alon Yefet (Israel)

13 October 2007
16:00 UTC+0

Iceland	2–4	Latvia
Guðjohnsen 4', 52'	Report	Kļava 27'; Laizāns 31'; Verpakovskis 37', 46'

Laugardalsvöllur, Reykjavík
Attendance: 5,865
Referee: Mike Dean (England)
13 October 2007
19:00 UTC+2

Liechtenstein	0–3	Sweden
	Report	Ljungberg 19'; Wilhelmsson 29'; A. Svensson 56'

Rheinpark, Vaduz
Attendance: 4,131
Referee: Paolo Dondarini (Italy)
13 October 2007
20:00 UTC+2

Denmark	1–3	Spain
Tomasson 87'	Report	Tamudo 14'; Ramos 40'; Riera 89'

NRGi Park, Aarhus
Attendance: 19,849
Referee: Ľuboš Micheľ (Slovakia)

17 October 2007
20:00 UTC+2

Denmark	3–1	Latvia
Tomasson 7' (pen.); U. Laursen 27'; Rommedahl 90'	Report	Gorkšs 80'

Parken Stadium, Copenhagen
Attendance: 19,004
Referee: Cüneyt Çakır (Turkey)
17 October 2007
20:00 UTC+2

Liechtenstein	3–0	Iceland
Frick 28'; T. Beck 80', 82'	Report

Rheinpark, Vaduz
Attendance: 2,589
Referee: Christoforos Zografos (Greece)
17 October 2007
20:30 UTC+2

Sweden	1–1	Northern Ireland
Mellberg 15'	Report	Lafferty 72'

Råsunda Stadion, Solna
Attendance: 33,112
Referee: Bertrand Layec (France)

17 November 2007
18:00 UTC+2

Latvia	4–1	Liechtenstein
Karlsons 14'; Verpakovskis 30'; Laizāns 63'; Višņakovs 87'	Report	Zirnis 13' (o.g.)

Skonto Stadions, Riga
Attendance: 4,800
Referee: Svein Oddvar Moen (Norway)
17 November 2007
19:45 UTC+0

Northern Ireland	2–1	Denmark
Feeney 62'; Healy 80'	Report	Bendtner 51'

Windsor Park, Belfast
Attendance: 12,997
Referee: Pieter Vink (Netherlands)
17 November 2007
22:00 UTC+1

Spain	3–0	Sweden
Capdevila 14'; Iniesta 39'; Ramos 65'	Report

Santiago Bernabéu, Madrid
Attendance: 67,055
Referee: Roberto Rosetti (Italy)

21 November 2007
20:00 UTC+1

Denmark	3–0	Iceland
Bendtner 34'; Tomasson 44'; Kahlenberg 59'	Report

Parken Stadium, Copenhagen
Attendance: 15,393
Referee: Olegário Benquerença (Portugal)
21 November 2007
19:00 UTC+0

Spain	1–0	Northern Ireland
Xavi 52'	Report

Estadio Gran Canaria, Las Palmas
Attendance: 30,339
Referee: Herbert Fandel (Germany)
21 November 2007
20:00 UTC+1

Sweden	2–1	Latvia
Allbäck 1'; Källström 57'	Report	Laizāns 26'

Råsunda Stadion, Solna
Attendance: 26,128
Referee: Wolfgang Stark (Germany)

== Goalscorers ==
There were 121 goals scored in 42 matches, for an average of 2.88 goals per match. (Note: The goal tally takes into account the original result of fixtures that were subsequently forfeited, not the awarded scoreline.)

13 goals

- (Northern Ireland) David Healy

8 goals

- (Denmark) Jon Dahl Tomasson

7 goals

- (Spain) David Villa

6 goals

- (Sweden) Marcus Allbäck

5 goals

- (Latvia) Māris Verpakovskis

4 goals

- (Denmark) Dennis Rommedahl
- (Liechtenstein) Mario Frick
- (Spain) Xavi
- (Sweden) Johan Elmander

3 goals

- (Iceland) Eiður Guðjohnsen
- (Latvia) Juris Laizāns
- (Spain) Andrés Iniesta
- (Sweden) Kim Källström

2 goals

- (Denmark) Nicklas Bendtner
- (Denmark) Michael Gravgaard
- (Denmark) Morten Nordstrand
- (Latvia) Ģirts Karlsons
- (Latvia) Aleksejs Višņakovs
- (Liechtenstein) Thomas Beck
- (Northern Ireland) Kyle Lafferty
- (Spain) Sergio Ramos
- (Spain) Fernando Torres
- (Sweden) Olof Mellberg
- (Sweden) Markus Rosenberg
- (Sweden) Anders Svensson
- (Sweden) Christian Wilhelmsson

1 goal

- (Denmark) Daniel Agger
- (Denmark) Leon Andreasen
- (Denmark) Daniel Jensen
- (Denmark) Thomas Kahlenberg
- (Denmark) Martin Laursen
- (Denmark) Ulrik Laursen
- (Iceland) Ármann Smári Björnsson
- (Iceland) Brynjar Gunnarsson
- (Iceland) Emil Hallfreðsson
- (Iceland) Hermann Hreiðarsson
- (Iceland) Gunnar Heiðar Þorvaldsson
- (Iceland) Arnar Viðarsson
- (Latvia) Kaspars Gorkšs
- (Latvia) Oskars Kļava
- (Liechtenstein) Franz Burgmeier
- (Liechtenstein) Raphael Rohrer
- (Northern Ireland) Warren Feeney
- (Northern Ireland) Grant McCann
- (Spain) Joan Capdevila
- (Spain) Luis García
- (Spain) Fernando Morientes
- (Spain) Albert Riera
- (Spain) Raúl Tamudo
- (Sweden) Petter Hansson
- (Sweden) Freddie Ljungberg

1 own goal

- (Latvia) Dzintars Zirnis (against Liechtenstein)
- (Northern Ireland) Chris Baird (against Latvia)
- (Northern Ireland) Keith Gillespie (against Iceland)
