= Ivan Quintans =

Liechtenstein footballer (born 1989)

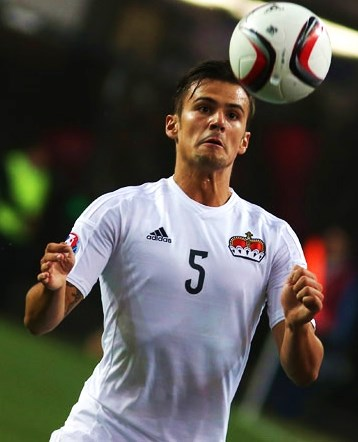

Personal information
- Full name: Ivan Quintans
- Date of birth: 15 October 1989 (age 37)
- Place of birth: Schaan, Liechtenstein
- Height: 1.84 m (6 ft 1/2 in)
- Position: Left back

Senior career*
Years	Team	Apps	(Gls)
2007–2010	FC Schaan		
2009–2011	USV Eschen/Mauren	13	(0)
2011–2016	FC Balzers	83	(6)
2016–2020	USV Eschen/Mauren	53	(1)
2020–2021	FC Buchs		

International career^{‡}
2009–2010	Liechtenstein U-21	6	(0)
2011–2018	Liechtenstein	31	(0)
- * Club domestic league appearances and goals as of 27 June 2022 ‡ National team caps and goals as of 19 November 2018

Ivan Quintans (born 15 October 1989) is a retired Liechtensteiner footballer. His father is from Dumbría, Spain, while his mother is Croatian.

== International career ==
He was a member of the Liechtenstein national football team and holds 31 caps, making his debut in a friendly against Hungary on 11 November 2011.
