= Raphael Rohrer =

Former Liechtenstein footballer

Personal information
- Date of birth: 3 May 1985 (age 41)
- Place of birth: Liechtenstein
- Height: 1.80 m (5 ft 11 in)
- Position: Midfielder

Youth career
- 1994–2002: FC Schaan

Senior career*
Years	Team	Apps	(Gls)
2002–2003	FC Schaan		
2003–2004	FC Vaduz		
2004–2005	FC Chur 97		
2005–2007	USV Eschen/Mauren		
2007–2008	FC Vaduz	14	(1)
2008–2011	USV Eschen/Mauren	70	(12)
2011–2016	FC Triesen		
2016–2019	FC Buchs		

International career
2003–2009	Liechtenstein	44	(1)

Managerial career
- 2012–2016: FC Triesen (player-coach)
- 2018–2019: FC Buchs (player-coach)
- * Club domestic league appearances and goals

Raphael Rohrer (born 3 May 1985) is a former Liechtenstein footballer.

== Coaching career ==
In the summer 2011, Rohrer was appointed player-head coach of FC Triesen. He was replaced in the summer 2016. He then joined FC Buchs as a player. In February 2018, he took charge of the team as a player-head coach. He left the club in the summer 2019.

== International career ==
He also played for the Liechtenstein national football team, earning 44 caps and one goal to his name, versus Iceland.

=== International goals ===
Scores and results list Liechtenstein's goal tally first.

#	Date	Venue	Opponent	Score	Result	Competition
1.	2 June 2007	Laugardalsvöllur, Reykjavík, Iceland	Iceland	1–0	1–1	UEFA Euro 2008 qualification
