= Thomas Hobi =

Liechtensteiner footballer

Personal information
- Date of birth: 20 June 1993 (age 33)
- Place of birth: Balzers, Liechtenstein
- Height: 1.89 m (6 ft 2 in)
- Position: Goalkeeper

Team information
- Current team: FC Balzers

Youth career
- ?–2013: FC Balzers

Senior career*
Years	Team	Apps	(Gls)
2013–2018	FC Balzers	65	(0)
2018–2019	VfB Hohenems	22	(0)
2019–	FC Balzers	40	(0)

International career^{‡}
2014	Liechtenstein U21	1	(0)
2019–	Liechtenstein	5	(0)
- * Club domestic league appearances and goals as of 6 June 2026 ‡ National team caps and goals as of 8 June 2021

Thomas Hobi (born 20 June 1993) is a Liechtensteiner footballer who currently plays as a goalkeeper for FC Balzers.

== Club career ==
=== FC Balzers ===
==== 2013–2014 season ====
Hobi played football at the youth teams of FC Balzers, making his first appearance for the senior team in 2014 in a 0:0 draw against SV Höngg In total, Hobi made 4 league appearances in the 2013–14 season, as well as 1 appearance in the Liechtenstein Cup – a 4–1 loss to USV Eschen/Mauren.

==== 2014–2015 season ====
In the 2014–15 season, Hobi was the first choice keeper at Balzers, playing in 25 of the team's 26 league games and keeping 6 clean sheets. Hobi also played in 1 Liechtenstein Cup match, a 7:0 second round win over USV Eschen/Mauren II, however was left on the bench for the team's 4:1 loss to FC Vaduz II in the quarter-finals.

==== 2015–2016 season ====
Unlike the previous season, Hobi was not the first choice goalkeeper for the entire league campaign, only playing 16 of a possible 26 matches, with Claudio Majer being preferred for the other 9 matches. He was first dropped on 13 September 2015 after conceding 4 goals in his first 3 matches of the season, and would not play for the next 5 matches before returning to the starting 11 in a home 1:1 draw against FC Thalwil. Hobi had one appearance in the Liechtenstein Cup in 2015–16, a 4:2 loss against FC Schaan after extra time.

==== 2016–2017 season ====
In the 2016–17 season, Hobi returned to being first choice keeper and started 20 league matches, missing 3 due to a fractured finger. He played for just 45 minutes of the team's 3 match Liechtenstein cup run, a 5:1 victory over FC Triesen II.

==== 2017–2018 season ====
The 2017–18 season was the first season since breaking into the senior squad that Hobi did not start a single match – with Oliver Klaus being the preferred starter – and frequently did not make the bench over Claudio Majer, only making it 12 times throughout the season. Despite this, Hobi did make one appearance in the club's run to the Liechtenstein cup Final: a 6:1 win over Eschen/Mauren's 3rd team. At the end of the 2017–18 season, Hobi joined VfB Hohenems on a free transfer.

=== VfB Hohenems ===
==== 2018–2019 season ====
Hobi made his debut for VfB Hohenems in a 3:0 defeat to SV Wörgl. He made 22 league appearances for the team in his first season, missing 3 matches due to being on international duty. He made his first and only appearance in the Austrian Cup in a 5:2 loss to Floridsdorfer AC.

=== FC Balzers 2 ===
After one season at VfB Hohenems, Hobi rejoined his former team FC Balzers, this time for the club's 2nd team. However, he has not yet started a match since joining the club.

== International career ==
=== Liechtenstein U21 ===
Hobi was first called up for the Liechtenstein under-21 football team for a European Under-21 Championship qualification match on 5 March 2014, and made his first and only appearance for the Under-21s in a 5:0 international friendly loss against Belarus.

=== Liechtenstein ===
Hobi was first called up for the senior national team in 2016 but did not make his senior debut until a Euro 2020 qualifying match against Armenia, which ended in a 3–0 defeat for Liechtenstein.

== Career statistics ==
=== Club ===
As of 9 June 2019

Club	Season	League			Cup (Note: Includes Liechtenstein Football Cup, and Austrian Cup)		Other		Total	
Club	Season	Division	Apps	Goals	Apps	Goals	Apps	Goals	Apps	Goals
FC Balzers	2013–14	1. Liga Group 3	4	0	1	0	—		5	0
FC Balzers	2014–15	1. Liga Group 3	25	0	1	0	—		26	0
FC Balzers	2015–16	1. Liga Group 3	16	0	1	0	—		17	0
FC Balzers	2016–17	1. Liga Group 3	20	0	1	0	—		21	0
FC Balzers	2017–18	1. Liga Group 3	0	0	1	0	—		1	0
FC Balzers	Total		65	0	5	0	—		70	0
VfB Hohenems	2018–19	Regionalliga West	22	0	1	0	—		23	0
VfB Hohenems	Total		22	0	1	0	—		23	0
FC Balzers 2	2019–20	4. Liga Group 2	0	0	0	0	—		0	0
Career total			77	0	6	0	—		93	0

=== International ===
As of 8 June 2021

Liechtenstein
Year	Apps	Goals
2019	2	0
2020	2	0
2021	1	0
Total	5	0
