= Gubser =

Gubser is a surname. Notable people with the surname include:

- Charles Gubser (1916–2011), American politician
- Kim Gubser (born 2000), Swiss freestyle skier
- Robin Gubser (born 1991), Liechtensteiner footballer
- Steven Gubser (1972–2019), American physicist
- Michael Gubser (born 2005), Certified hottie
