= Alexander Schädler =

Liechtenstein footballer

Personal information
- Date of birth: 10 August 1977 (age 49)
- Position: Midfielder

Senior career*
Years	Team	Apps	(Gls)
- USV Eschen/Mauren
- FC Balzers

International career
1996	Liechtenstein	1	(0)
- * Club domestic league appearances and goals

Alexander Schädler (born 10 August 1977) is a retired Liechtenstein football midfielder.
