= Lucas Eberle =

Liechtensteiner footballer

Personal information
- Full name: Lucas Eberle
- Date of birth: 13 October 1990 (age 36)
- Place of birth: Vaduz, Liechtenstein
- Height: 1.83 m (6 ft 0 in)
- Position: Attacking midfielder

Team information
- Current team: FC Schaan

Youth career
- 2004–2008: FC Vaduz

Senior career*
Years	Team	Apps	(Gls)
2007–2008	FC Vaduz	1	(0)
2008–2010	FC Balzers	25	(9)
2010–2011	USV Eschen/Mauren	12	(0)
2011–2013	FC Balzers	25	(1)
2013–2015	FC Triesenberg		
2015–2017	FC Schaan		
2017–2018	FC Sevelen		
2018–	FC Schaan		

International career^{‡}
2008–2012	Liechtenstein U-21	14	(0)
2009–2014	Liechtenstein	12	(0)
- * Club domestic league appearances and goals as of 26 June 2023 ‡ National team caps and goals as of 9 March 2014

Lucas Eberle (born 13 October 1990 in Vaduz) is a Liechtensteiner footballer who plays for FC Schaan.

== Career ==
Eberle began his career in the youth side with the U-14 of FC Vaduz and signed in summer 2008 for FC Balzers. In the summer of 2010, Eberle moved onto USV Eschen/Mauren, and returned to Balzers in 2011.

== International career ==
He was a member of the Liechtenstein national football team and holds 12 caps.
