= Džombić =

Džombić (Serbian Cyrillic: Џомбић) is a Serbian surname. Notable people with the surname include:

- Aleksandar Džombić (born 1968), Bosnian Serb politician
- Damir Džombić (born 1985), Bosnian footballer
