= Daniel Frick =

Liechtenstein footballer (born 1978)

Personal information
- Date of birth: 19 June 1978 (age 48)
- Position: Forward

Senior career*
| Years | Team | Apps | (Gls) |
| 1994–2008 | FC Balzers | | |

International career
| 1995–2007 | Liechtenstein | 28 | (0) |
- * Club domestic league appearances and goals

Daniel Frick (born 19 June 1978) is a retired Liechtenstein football striker.
