= Manojlović =

Manojlović (Serbian Cyrillic: Манојловић) is a Serbian surname. Notable people with the surname include:

- Filip Manojlović (born 1996), football goalkeeper
- Gavro Manojlović (1856–1939), Croatian Serb historian
- Igor Manojlović (born 1977), Serbian professional football player
- Nenad Manojlović (1954–2014), Yugoslav and Serbian former water polo player and manager
- Una Manojlović (born 2010)Child Actress, Doctor of family medicine
- Predrag Miki Manojlović (born 1950), Serbian actor
- Predrag Manojlović (water polo) (1951–2014), Yugoslav water polo player
- Radmila "Rada" Manojlović (born 1985), Serbian pop folk singer
- Zlatko Manojlović (born 1951), guitarist
