= Damir Džombić =

Bosnian-Herzegovinian footballer (born 1985)

Personal information
- Full name: Damir Džombić
- Date of birth: 3 January 1985 (age 41)
- Place of birth: Srebrenik, SFR Yugoslavia
- Height: 1.89 m (6 ft 2 1/2 in)
- Position: Defender

Youth career
- –2002: Wangen bei Olten
- 2002–2004: Basel

Senior career*
Years	Team	Apps	(Gls)
2002–2004	Basel	25	(1)
2004–2007	Basel	6	(0)
2004–2005	→ FC Wil (loan)	9	(0)
2007–2009	Vaduz	48	(1)
2009–2010	Aarau	1	(0)
2011	Wil	0	(0)
2011	Schaffhausen	4	(0)
2011-2012	FC Schötz	10	(0)
2012-2013	Kriens	20	(0)
2013-2014	Grenchen	12	(1)
2014	Wangen bei Olten	8	(0)
2014-2015	Brunnen		
2016	Sursee		

International career
2004	Switzerland U-19	1	(0)
2005	Bosnia-Herzegovina U-21	1	(0)
- * Club domestic league appearances and goals

Damir Džombić (born 3 January 1985) is a Bosnian retired football player who played as defender.

== Club career ==
Džombić played his early youth football by Wangen bei Olten. In 2002 he joined the youth department of FC Basel and played in their U-21 team, in the third tier of Swiss football. During the spring in 2004 he was called up to their first team by head coach Christian Gross. Džombić played his domestic league debut for the club in the away game in the Stadion Brügglifeld on 18 April as Basel were defeated 3–0 by Aarau. He played the full 90 minutes, but was booked for a rude foul. At the end of the 2003–04 league season Basel won the championship.

To the beginning of the next 2004–05 season, Džombić only had appearances in test games. So at the end of July he was loaned out to Swiss Challenge League team FC Wil so that he could gain playing experience. Wil had been relegated the season before but had also won the Swiss Cup and were qualified for the UEFA Cup. Here in the first round, they played against Slovak club Dukla Banská Bystrica. In the first leg an away game on 12 August 2004 in the SNP Stadium, Džombić was dismissed in the 78th minute for a second bookable foul.

Then he returned to Basel, but he failed to break into their first-team. In February 2006 he suffered a cruciate ligament tear, which threw him back in his progression. To help in his rehabilitation, the next season he trained and played with the U-21 team. The club understood his situation and he was released in 2007.

On 20 June 2007 it was announced that Džombić had signed a one-year contract for Liechtenstein's second-tier team FC Vaduz on a free transfer. He played with them regularly in the 2007–08 Challenge League season and helped them win the division one point ahead of AC Bellinzona to earn promotion to the Swiss Super League in 2008. The team also won the 2007–08 Liechtenstein Cup. The club and the centre back prolonged their contract for a further season. Džombić scored the first goal in his professional career against FC Sion at the Rheinpark Stadion on 16 August 2008. But this could not help the team, because they suffered a 2–1 defeat. The team won the 2008–09 Liechtenstein Cup. However, at the end of the 2008–09 season Vaduz were in bottom positions in the league table and suffered relegation.

In the 2009–10 season Džombić was without a club and in August 2010 he signed for FC Aarau. However it soon came to internal differences and in December he was released by the club. In January 2011 he joined FC Wil for training purposes only. As he was free agent he was able to sign for Schaffhausen outside the transfer window and on 10 May it was announced that they had received the license to do so, until the end of the season.

He later played for several lower league sides in Switzerland.

== International career ==
Džombić was capped for Swiss youth teams before he switched allegiance to Bosnia and Herzegovina. He played for their U21 team in 2006 UEFA European Under-21 Football Championship qualification.

== Honours ==
Basel

- Swiss Super League: 2003–04

Vaduz

- Swiss Challenge League: 2007–08
- Liechtenstein Football Cup: 2007–08, 2008–09

== Sources ==
- Die ersten 125 Jahre. Publisher: Josef Zindel im Friedrich Reinhardt Verlag, Basel. ISBN 978-3-7245-2305-5
- Verein "Basler Fussballarchiv" Homepage
