= Francesco Russo =

Francesco Russo may refer to:

- Francesco Russo (footballer)
- Francesco Russo (actor)
