= Olcay Gür =

Liechtenstein footballer

Personal information
- Full name: Olcay Gür
- Date of birth: 27 March 1991 (age 35)
- Place of birth: Arsin, Turkey
- Height: 1.85 m (6 ft 1 in)
- Position: Defender

Team information
- Current team: FC Ruggell
- Number: 61

Youth career
- Team Liechtenstein
- USV Eschen/Mauren

Senior career*
| Years | Team | Apps | (Gls) |
| 2009–2010 | USV Eschen/Mauren | | |
| 2010–2011 | FC Schaan | | |
| 2011–2012 | FC Linth 04 | | |
| 2012–2013 | FC Chur 97 | | |
| 2013–2015 | Gaziantep BB | 0 | (0) |
| 2015–2016 | FV Ravensburg | 0 | (0) |
| 2016 | FC St. Margrethen | 12 | (0) |
| 2017 | VfB Hohenems | 4 | (0) |
| 2017–2020 | FC Chur 97 | 33 | (5) |
| 2020–2021 | FC St. Margrethen | | |
| 2021–2024 | FC Buchs | | |
| 2024– | FC Ruggell | | |

International career^{‡}
| 2010–2012 | Liechtenstein U21 | 7 | (0) |
| 2013–2020 | Liechtenstein | 6 | (0) |
- * Club domestic league appearances and goals as of 31 May 2025 ‡ National team caps and goals as of 14:46, 17 May 2020 (UTC)

Olcay Gür (born 27 March 1991) is a footballer who plays for FC Ruggell. Born in Turkey, he represented the Liechtenstein national team.

== International career ==
He is a member of the Liechtenstein national football team and holds six caps, making his debut in a friendly against Azerbaijan on 6 February 2013.
