= Philipp Ospelt =

Liechtensteiner footballer (born 1992)

Personal information
- Full name: Philipp Ospelt
- Date of birth: 7 October 1992 (age 34)
- Place of birth: Munich, Germany
- Position: Second striker

Team information
- Current team: FC Ruggell
- Number: 23

Youth career
- 2009–2010: Bayern München
- 2010–2011: Buchs

Senior career*
Years	Team	Apps	(Gls)
2011–2013	USV Eschen/Mauren	15	(0)
2013–2015	FC Vaduz II	41	(18)
2015–2016	WSG Wattens II	12	(3)
2016–2018	FC Vaduz II	22	(6)
2017–2018	FC Vaduz	1	(0)
2019–2021	USV Eschen/Mauren	25	(4)
2021–	FC Ruggell		

International career^{‡}
2010–2011	Germany U18	0	(0)
2011–2012	Liechtenstein U19	3	(0)
2011–2014	Liechtenstein U21	14	(0)
2012–	Liechtenstein	23	(0)
- * Club domestic league appearances and goals as of 26 June 2023 ‡ National team caps and goals as of 19 November 2024

Philipp Ospelt (born 7 October 1992) is a footballer who plays as a striker for Liechtenstein club FC Ruggell. Born in Germany, he represents the Liechtenstein national team.

== Career ==
Ospelt has played club football in Switzerland for Buchs and Liechtenstein for FC Vaduz and USV Eschen/Mauren.

He made his international debut for Liechtenstein on 13 October 2012 against Lithuania, coming on as a substitute for Philippe Erne.
