= Martin Heeb =

Liechtenstein footballer

Personal information
- Full name: Martin Heeb
- Date of birth: 5 November 1969 (age 56)
- Place of birth: Liechtenstein
- Position: Goalkeeper

Senior career*
Years	Team	Apps	(Gls)
1993–1995	FC Schaan		
1995–1997	FC Vaduz		
1997–2009	USV Eschen/Mauren		

International career^{‡}
1994–2004	Liechtenstein	24	(0)
- * Club domestic league appearances and goals ‡ National team caps and goals as of 7 March 2012

Martin Heeb (born 5 November 1969) is a retired Liechtenstein football player.

== International career ==
He was a member of the Liechtenstein national football team from 1994 to 2004.
