= Igor Manojlović =

Serbian footballer

Personal information
- Full name: Igor Manojlović
- Date of birth: 30 March 1977 (age 49)
- Place of birth: Belgrade, SR Serbia, SFR Yugoslavia
- Height: 1.90 m (6 ft 3 in)
- Position: Forward

Team information
- Current team: FC Vaduz III (player-manager)

Senior career*
Years	Team	Apps	(Gls)
1994–1998	Radnički Beograd		
1998–2000	Obilić	14	(3)
1999	→ Radnički Niš (loan)	7	(1)
2001	Milicionar		
2001–2004	Radnički Obrenovac		
2005	FC Vaduz		
2005	Chur		
2006	Schwanenstadt	31	(5)
2007	Feldkirchen	9	(2)
2007	RW Rankweil	14	(2)
2008–2010	SW Bregenz	65	(39)
2010–2011	Höchst	28	(5)
2011–2014	USV Eschen/Mauren	56	(11)
2014–2015	USV Eschen/Mauren II		
2015–2016	FC Gams		
2016–2017	FC Triesen		
2017–2018	FC Triesen II		
2018–2021	FC Gams		
2021–	FC Vaduz III		

Managerial career
- 2016–2017: FC Triesen (player-manager)
- 2021–: FC Vaduz III (player-manager)
- * Club domestic league appearances and goals

Igor Manojlović (Serbian Cyrillic: Игор Манојловић; born 30 March 1977) is a Serbian football player-manager.

== Career ==
In the summer of 1998, Manojlović was signed by FR Yugoslavia champions Obilić, but failed to make an impact. He later went abroad and won the Liechtenstein Cup with FC Vaduz in the 2004–05 season, as well as with USV Eschen/Mauren in the 2011–12 season.

== Honours ==
FC Vaduz

- Liechtenstein Cup: 2004–05

USV Eschen/Mauren

- Liechtenstein Cup: 2011–12
