= Willy Pizzi =

Association footballer (born 1994)

Personal information
- Full name: Villiam Pizzi
- Date of birth: 28 December 1994 (age 31)
- Place of birth: Lecce, Italy
- Height: 1.67 m (5 ft 6 in)
- Positions: Forward; winger

Team information
- Current team: Balzers
- Number: 11

Youth career
- –2011: Lecce
- 2011–2012: Sulmona Calcio
- 2012–2013: Pescara

Senior career*
| Years | Team | Apps | (Gls) |
| 2013–2015 | Ancona | 25 | (4) |
| 2015 | Balzers | 12 | (8) |
| 2015–2016 | Tuggen | 22 | (7) |
| 2016–2019 | Linth 04 | 71 | (36) |
| 2019–2020 | Brühl | 17 | (3) |
| 2020–2021 | YF Juventus | 6 | (0) |
| 2021 | Linth 04 | 0 | (0) |
| 2021–2022 | Zug | 22 | (7) |
| 2022–2023 | Balzers | 28 | (21) |
| 2023–2026 | Eschen/Mauren | 77 | (20) |
| 2026– | Balzers | 5 | (2) |

International career^{‡}
| 2009 | Liechtenstein U16 | 2 | (0) |
| 2025– | Liechtenstein | 11 | (0) |
- * Club domestic league appearances and goals as of 20 September 2026 ‡ National team caps and goals as of 5 October 2026

Villiam "Willy" Pizzi (born 28 December 1994) is a footballer who plays as a forward for 2. Liga Interregional club Balzers. Born in Italy, he plays for the Liechtenstein national team.

== Club career ==
Pizzi's career began in his native Italy with the youth sides of Lecce, Sulmona Calcio and Pescara before turning professional with Serie D club Ancona with whom he made 25 league appearances between 2013 and 2015, including eight in Serie C following Ancona's promotion.

After leaving the Marche club, Pizzi has spent the next decade with lower league sides throughout Switzerland and Liechtenstein, including playing 23 matches in the Swiss Promotion League for Brühl and YF Juventus between 2019 and 2021.

Pizzi moved to current club Eschen/Mauren in the summer of 2023.

He returned to Balzers as a player-coach in the summer of 2026.

== International career ==
Despite having represented the principality in two under-16 friendlies in 2009 as a 14-year old, Pizzi did not gain Liechtensteiner citizenship until the autumn of 2024.

He would make his first appearance for the senior national team in a 2026 FIFA World Cup qualification match on 22 March 2025 when he was named in the starting lineup against North Macedonia.

== Career statistics ==
As of match played 5 October 2026

Liechtenstein
| Year | Apps | Goals |
|---|---|---|
| 2025 | 8 | 0 |
| 2026 | 3 | 0 |
| Total | 11 | 0 |
