= Michael Nushöhr =

German footballer

Personal information
- Date of birth: 14 August 1962 (age 64)
- Place of birth: Ulm, Germany
- Height: 1.83 m (6 ft 0 in)
- Position: Defender

Senior career*
Years	Team	Apps	(Gls)
1981–1983	SSV Ulm		
1983–1985	1. FC Saarbrücken		
1985–1987	VfB Stuttgart		
1987	1. FC Kaiserslautern		
1988–1992	1. FC Saarbrücken		
1992–1998	FC Balzers		

International career
1981	Germany U20	1	(0)

Managerial career
- 1992–1998: FC Balzers (player-manager)
- 1998–2005: FC Chur 97
- 2007–2012: FC Balzers
- * Club domestic league appearances and goals

Michael Nushöhr (born 14 August 1962) is a German retired footballer who played as a defender. He appeared at the 1981 FIFA World Youth Championship.
