= Roland Moser =

Liechtensteiner footballer

Personal information
- Date of birth: 19 September 1962 (age 64)
- Position: Midfielder

Senior career*
Years	Team	Apps	(Gls)
1980–1981	FC Vaduz		
1981–1982	FC Altstetten (ZH)		
–1993	FC Vaduz		
1993–1996	USV Eschen/Mauren		

International career
1993–1995	Liechtenstein	11	(0)
- * Club domestic league appearances and goals

Roland Moser (born 19 September 1962) is a retired Liechtensteiner football midfielder. He was awarded the Liechtensteiner Footballer of the Year title in 1995. Besides Liechtenstein, he has played in Switzerland.
