= Ramon Cecchini =

Swiss footballer (born 1990)

Personal information
- Full name: Ramon Cecchini
- Date of birth: 30 August 1990 (age 36)
- Place of birth: Winterthur, Switzerland
- Height: 1.74 m (5 ft 9 in)
- Position: Midfielder

Team information
- Current team: Cham
- Number: 12

Youth career
- Winterthur

Senior career*
Years	Team	Apps	(Gls)
2006–2008	Winterthur	2	(0)
2007–2008	Winterthur U21	26	(3)
2008–2010	Basel U21	47	(8)
2010–2011	Grasshoppers U21	20	(10)
2011–2017	Vaduz	101	(9)
2016	→ Winterthur (loan)	13	(0)
2017–2019	Young Fellows Juventus	52	(3)
2019–	Cham	13	(1)

International career
2011	Switzerland U17	5	(0)
- * Club domestic league appearances and goals as of 23:07, 26 December 2019 (UTC)

Ramon Cecchini (born 30 August 1990) is a Swiss footballer who plays for SC Cham.

== Career ==
On 8 August 2019 it was confirmed that Cecchini had joined SC Cham on a deal until 30 June 2020.

== International career ==
Cecchini is a youth international for Switzerland.

== Honours ==
Vaduz

- Swiss Challenge League (1): 2013–14
- Liechtenstein Football Cup (5): 2012–13, 2013–14, 2014–15, 2015–16, 2016-17
