= Gaspar (footballer, born 1981) =

Brazilian footballer

Personal information
- Full name: Odirlei de Souza Gaspar
- Date of birth: 18 May 1981 (age 45)
- Place of birth: Itatiba, Brazil
- Height: 1.78 m (5 ft 10 in)
- Position: Striker

Senior career*
| Years | Team | Apps | (Gls) |
| –2002 | São Bento | | |
| 2002–2003 | Nuremberg II | 17 | (4) |
| 2003–2004 | Malcantone Agno | 29 | (9) |
| 2004–2005 | Lugano | 15 | (8) |
| 2005–2009 | Vaduz | 121 | (58) |
| 2009–2011 | Bellinzona | 9 | (1) |
| 2010 | → Lausanne-Sport (loan) | 6 | (2) |
| 2011 | → Chiasso (loan) | 9 | (3) |
| 2011–2012 | Chiasso | 22 | (7) |
| 2012–2013 | Wohlen | 43 | (16) |
| Total | | 271+ | (108+) |
- * Club domestic league appearances and goals

Odirlei de Souza Gaspar (born 18 May 1981) is a retired Brazilian football player.

== Honours ==
Individual

- Liechtensteiner Footballer of the Year: 2007–08
