= Dzintars Zirnis =

Latvian former football defender (born 1977)

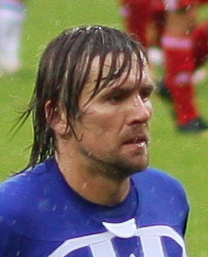
- Zirnis playing for FK Liepājas Metalurgs

Personal information
- Full name: Dzintars Zirnis
- Date of birth: 25 April 1977 (age 49)
- Place of birth: Riga, Latvian SSR, Soviet Union (now Republic of Latvia)
- Height: 1.80 m (5 ft 11 in)
- Position: Defender

Team information
- Current team: 1625 Liepāja

Senior career*
Years	Team	Apps	(Gls)
1996	Pārdaugava Rīga	0	(0)
1997–2013	Liepājas Metalurgs	403	(7)
2015	Olaine	0	(0)
2015	1625 Liepāja	0	(0)

International career^{‡}
1997–2010	Latvia	68	(0)
- * Club domestic league appearances and goals as of 25 June 2015 ‡ National team caps and goals as of 3 January 2015

Dzintars Zirnis (born 25 April 1977 in Riga) is a Latvian former football defender. He last played for Latvian First League club FK 1625 Liepāja. For almost his entire career, Zirnis played for FK Liepājas Metalurgs in the Latvian Higher League, making his debut in 1997 and playing there until 2013. He was also a member of the Latvia national football team.

== Club career ==
Zirnis played for FK Pārdaugava Rīga before joining FK Liepājas Metalurgs in 1997. In September 2004 he played in the UEFA Cup for Metalurgs in which the club beat Faroe Islands club, B36 Tórshavn 11–2 over two legs in the first qualifying round and then beat the Swedish Allsvenskan club Östers IF in the second qualifying round. Metalurgs were beaten by the German Bundesliga club FC Schalke 04 in the first round, 9–1 over two legs. On 1 October 2005 Zirnis was a part of the Metalurgs team that beat FK Ventspils 5–1 to seal the club's first ever Latvian Higher League title. Zirnis ended his professional career after the 2013 Latvian Higher League season, having played 403 league matches and scored 7 goals. He is one of the most capped players in the history of the Latvian top tier championship behind his ex-teammate Viktors Spole and Igors Korabļovs.

== International career ==
Zirnis made his debut for Latvia national football team on 19 August 1997 in a 0–0 draw with Azerbaijan. In November 2003 he was a part of the Latvian team that beat Turkey over two legs to qualify for the UEFA Euro 2004 finals, for the first time qualifying for a major international tournament. and played at the finals in 2004. Zirnis was sent off in the Baltic Cup final against Lithuania in Kaunas on 22 May 2005. On 17 November 2007 he scored an own goal to give Liechtenstein the lead in a UEFA Euro 2008 qualifying Group F match which Latvia eventually won 4–1. Zirnis played 68 international matches for Latvia.

== Honours ==
Club

- Virsliga Champion (2): 2005, 2009
- Virsliga Runner-up (6): 2003, 2004, 2006, 2007, 2008, 2011
- Latvian Cup Winner (1): 2006
- Baltic League Champion (1): 2007
