= Robin Gubser =

Liechtenstein footballer

Personal information
- Full name: Robin Gubser
- Date of birth: 17 April 1991 (age 35)
- Position: Midfielder

Senior career*
Years	Team	Apps	(Gls)
2011–2013	FC Mels	34	(8)
2013–2018	FC Balzers	94	(10)
2018–2020	USV Eschen/Mauren	35	(3)
2020–2021	FC Mels	0	(0)

International career^{‡}
2013–2019	Liechtenstein	38	(1)
- * Club domestic league appearances and goals as of 27 June 2022 ‡ National team caps and goals as of 18 November 2019

Robin Gubser (born 17 April 1991) is a Liechtensteiner footballer who last played for FC Mels.

== International career ==
He was a member of the Liechtenstein national football team and holds 38 caps and has scored one goal, making his debut in a friendly against Poland on 4 June 2013.

=== International goals ===
Score and Result lists Liechtenstein's goal tally first

No.	Date	Venue	Opponent	Score	Result	Competition	Ref.
1.	28 March 2016	Estadio Municipal de Marbella, Marbella, Spain	Faroe Islands	1–3	2–3	Friendly	
