= Mario Markaj =

Albanian footballer

Personal information
- Date of birth: 5 March 1995 (age 31)
- Place of birth: Lezhë, Albania
- Position: Midfielder

Senior career*
Years	Team	Apps	(Gls)
2011-2013	Besëlidhja		
2013-2014	Olimpic CF		
2014-2015	Burreli		
2016-2017	Shënkolli		
- * Club domestic league appearances and goals

Mario Markaj (born 5 March 1995, in Lezha) is a professional Albanian footballer who currently plays as a midfielder for KS Burreli in the Albanian First Division.
