= Daniele Polverino =

Italian footballer (born 1976)

Personal information
- Date of birth: 24 January 1976 (age 50)
- Position: Forward

Senior career*
Years	Team	Apps	(Gls)
1993–1994	FC St. Gallen		
1994–2004	FC Vaduz		
2004–2006	FC Chur 97		
2006–2009	FC Balzers		
2010–2011	FC Schaan		

Managerial career
- FC Schaan
- * Club domestic league appearances and goals

Daniele Polverino (born 24 January 1976) is a retired Italian football striker.
