= Martin Telser =

Liechtenstein footballer

Personal information
- Full name: Martin Telser
- Date of birth: 16 October 1978 (age 48)
- Height: 1.70 m (5 ft 7 in)
- Position: Defender

Youth career
- 1986–1998: FC Balzers

Senior career*
Years	Team	Apps	(Gls)
1999–2006	FC Vaduz	140	(3)
2006–2009	FC Balzers		

International career^{‡}
1996–2007	Liechtenstein	73	(1)
- * Club domestic league appearances and goals as of 23 March 2018 ‡ National team caps and goals as of 14 June 2008

Martin Telser (born 16 October 1978) is a former Liechtenstein football defender, who last played for FC Balzers in the 2. Liga Interregional.

== International career ==
He made his international debut in friendly versus Germany in 1996 and went on to win 73 caps and score one goal for his country.

== International goals ==
#	Date	Venue	Opponent	Score	Result	Competition
1.	14 October 1998	Rheinpark Stadion, Vaduz, Liechtenstein	Azerbaijan	2-0	2-1	UEFA Euro 2000 Qualifying
