= Denis Markaj =

Kosovar footballer

Personal information
- Full name: Denis Markaj
- Date of birth: 20 February 1991 (age 35)
- Place of birth: Gjakova, SFR Yugoslavia
- Height: 1.80 m (5 ft 11 in)
- Position: Full-back

Team information
- Current team: Rapperswil-Jona
- Number: 31

Senior career*
Years	Team	Apps	(Gls)
2006–2012	Baden	111	(8)
2012	→ Chiasso (loan)	15	(2)
2012–2013	Bellinzona	8	(0)
2013	→ Lugano (loan)	18	(1)
2013–2015	Lugano	62	(4)
2015–2017	Aarau	22	(0)
2015–2016	→ Lugano (loan)	13	(0)
2016	→ Le Mont (loan)	11	(0)
2017–2019	Winterthur	55	(1)
2019–	Rapperswil-Jona	11	(0)

International career^{‡}
2014–2015	Kosovo	2	(0)
- * Club domestic league appearances and goals as of 13 August 2017 ‡ National team caps and goals as of 13 November 2015

Denis Markaj (born 20 February 1991) is a Kosovor professional footballer who plays as a full-back for Swiss club FC Rapperswil-Jona.

== International career ==
On 7 October 2015, Markaj received a call-up from Kosovo for a friendly match against Equatorial Guinea and made his debut after coming on as a substitute in the 57th minute in place of Leart Paqarada.
