= Francesco Russo (footballer) =

Italian footballer

Personal information
- Date of birth: 23 December 1981 (age 44)
- Place of birth: Angera, Italy
- Height: 1.88 m (6 ft 2 in)
- Position: Goalkeeper

Team information
- Current team: US Giubiasco

Senior career*
Years	Team	Apps	(Gls)
1999–2001	Torino	0	(0)
2001	→ Avellino (loan)	0	(0)
2001–2002	Lecco	6	(0)
2002–2003	Alzano	7	(0)
2003–2004	Solbiatese	13	(0)
2004	Palazzolo	16	(0)
2004–2007	Chiasso	100	(0)
2007–2008	Lanciano	14	(0)
2008–2009	Pro Sesto	5	(0)
2009	Melfi	15	(0)
2009–2010	Cavese	33	(0)
2010–2011	Pergocrema	34	(0)
2011–2018	Lugano	154	(0)
2016	→ Aarau (loan)	2	(0)
2017–2018	→ Chiasso (loan)	21	(0)
2019	FC Parabiago		
2019–2020	USD CasateseRogoredo		
2020–2022	Vergiatese		
2022–2024	Collina d'Oro	53	(0)
2024–2025	Aurora Cantalupo		
2025–	US Giubiasco		
- * Club domestic league appearances and goals as of 14 February 2026

Francesco Russo (born 23 December 1981) is an Italian footballer who plays as a goalkeeper for US Giubiasco.

== Biography ==
Russo left for Lecco from Torino in 2001 in co-ownership deal, along with Marco Andreotti. In 2002, he left for Alzano and in 2003 for Solbiatese. In January 2004, he was signed by Sampdoria and immediately left for Palazzolo.

In 2004, he was transferred to Swiss Challenge League side Chiasso. In 2007, Russo returned to Italy for Lanciano.

In March 2019, Russo returned to Italy and joined FC Parabiago. In the summer of 2019, he moved to USD Casatese Rogoredo.
