= Thomas Beck (footballer) =

Liechtenstein footballer

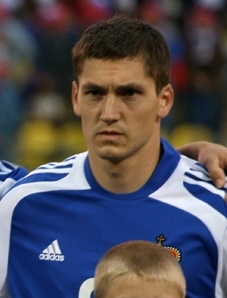

Personal information
- Date of birth: 21 February 1981 (age 45)
- Place of birth: Liechtenstein
- Height: 1.74 m (5 ft 8 1/2 in)
- Position: Striker

Youth career
- 1989–1998: FC Schaan

Senior career*
Years	Team	Apps	(Gls)
1999–2000	FC Vaduz	18	(9)
2000–2001	Grasshopper Club Zürich II	26	(7)
2001–2003	FC Vaduz	47	(5)
2003–2005	FC Chiasso	63	(17)
2005	SC Kriens	6	(1)
2006	FC Bad Ragaz		
2006–2008	FC Blau-Weiß Feldkirch	40	(28)
2008–2010	FC Hard	49	(41)
2010–2013	FC Balzers	28	(16)
2013–2014	FC Hard	29	(3)
2014–2016	FC Rot-Weiß Rankweil	47	(13)
2016–2017	SC Göfis	23	(7)
2017–2018	FC Triesenberg		
Total		376	(147)

International career^{‡}
1998–2013	Liechtenstein	92	(5)
- * Club domestic league appearances and goals as of 19 July 2020 ‡ National team caps and goals as of 24 November 2013

Thomas Beck (born 21 February 1981) is a retired Liechtenstein football striker who last played for FC Triesenberg.

Beck also played for the Liechtenstein national football team. He earned 92 caps and scored five goals for Liechtenstein after making his international debut in a Euro 2000 qualifier against Romania in September 1998.

Beck retired from international play in late 2013.

== International goals ==
#	Date	Venue	Opponent	Score	Result	Competition
1.	9 October 2004	Rheinpark Stadion, Vaduz, Liechtenstein	Portugal	2–2	2–2	2006 FIFA World Cup Qualifying
2.	26 March 2005	Rheinpark Stadion, Vaduz, Liechtenstein	Russia	1–2	1–2	2006 FIFA World Cup Qualifying
3.	7 September 2005	Rheinpark Stadion, Vaduz, Liechtenstein	Luxembourg	3–0	3–0	2006 FIFA World Cup Qualifying
4.	17 October 2007	Rheinpark Stadion, Vaduz, Liechtenstein	Iceland	2–0	3–0	UEFA Euro 2008 Qualifying
5.	17 October 2007	Rheinpark Stadion, Vaduz, Liechtenstein	Iceland	3–0	3–0	UEFA Euro 2008 Qualifying

== Honours ==
Individual

- Liechtensteiner Footballer of the Year: 2004–05
