= FC Balzers =

Association football club in Liechtenstein

Balzers
- Full name: Fussballclub Balzers
- Founded: 1 May 1932; 94 years ago
- Ground: Sportplatz Rheinau; Balzers, Liechtenstein
- Capacity: 2,000
- Chairman: Fredy Scherrer
- Manager: Marius Zarn
- League: 2. Liga Interregional
- 2025–26: Group 5, 5th of 14
- Website: fcbalzers.li
Home colours	Away colours

FC Balzers is a Liechtensteiner football team based in Balzers. They currently compete in the 2. Liga Interregional, the fifth tier of Swiss football.

Balzers play at Sportplatz Rheinau which is situated right next to the Rhine next to the border with Switzerland where the town of Trübbach lies.

== History ==
=== Formation and early years (1932–1970) ===
Founded in Balzers in 1932, FC Balzers was the first foreign team to join the Swiss Football Association and therefore is the oldest football team from Liechtenstein. On 22 May 1932, the team played its first friendly match against FC Chur. In 1947, the team was promoted to the 3. Liga for the first time, after winning their league in the 1946/47 season. The team won its first Liechtenstein Cup in 1964, becoming the fourth team to win the competition after FC Triesen, FC Vaduz and FC Schaan.

=== Promotions and Liechtenstein Cup domination (1970–1992) ===
The club moved to the Sportplatz Rheinhau in 1970, where it has remained ever since. In the same year, the Liechtenstein Cup Final was hosted in Balzers for the first time, in which FC Vaduz beat FC Schaan 2–1. This was also the year in which Balzers were promoted to the 2. Liga for the first time, after overcoming a 2-0 half time deficit to win 3–2, in a match for promotion against FC Altstätten. In 1973, the club won its second Liechtenstein Cup after beating FC Ruggell 2–1 in the final. In 1975, the 1964-65 Bundesliga top goalscorer Rudolf Brunnenmeier joined Balzers, and the team was promoted to the 1. Liga for the first time at the end of the 1975/76 season. From 1978 to 1984, Balzers won the Liechtenstein Cup 5 out of a possible 6 times, only finishing as runners up in 1979–80. Between 1986 and 1992 the club was relegated down to the 2. Liga and then promoted back up to the 1. Liga several times, however the club still won the Liechtenstein Cup twice in this period - in 1988-89 and 1990–91.

=== First European matches (1992–2000) ===
In 1992, having been relegated to the 2. Liga, the club signed former Bundesliga professional Michael Nushöhr as a player-manager. The club beat FC Schaan 5–2 in the Liechtenstein Cup Final after extra time, which meant the club qualified for the qualifying round of the UEFA Cup Winners' Cup. Balzers faced Albanian champions KS Albpetrol at home in the first leg, and won 3–1 after a goal by Nushöhr and two goals by an 18 year old Mario Frick. The second leg finished 0-0, which meant that for the first time a club from Liechtenstein had reached the first round for the first time. The club were eliminated from the competition after losing 11–1 on aggregate against Bulgarian side CSKA Sofia. In 1997, Balzers won the Liechtenstein cup for the 11th time, beating Vaduz 3–2 in the final, with Mario Frick scoring twice in extra time after being 2–1 down. This granted the team entry to the qualifying round of the Cup Winners' Cup for the second time, however this time they did not progress any further, losing 5–1 on aggregate to Hungarian side BVSC Budapest.

=== Recent history (2000 – present) ===
In 2001, Balzers were promoted to the 2.Liga interregional, however were relegated after just one season. In 2005-06 the club played in the Liechtenstein Cup Final, having not won the competition for 9 years and having lost in the final 4 times since their last triumph. Balzers were trailing 2–1 to professionals and winners in the past 8 seasons Vaduz, but in the 90th minute Balzers were awarded a penalty. This was scored by club captain Marco Büchel, forcing the game into extra time. Despite this, Balzers still lost the match 4–2 after extra time. In 2007 former player and manager Michael Nushöhr returned to manage the club, and in 2010 Balzers were promoted back into the 1. Liga, after a 14-year absence. In 2011, Liechtenstein record goalscorer Mario Frick rejoined his former club, and in 2011 he became the club's manager after the departure of Nushöhr. He retired from playing in 2015, continuing his managerial role until 2017. In 2018 the club was relegated down to the 2. Liga Interregional however the next season they were promoted as league champions back to the 1. Liga

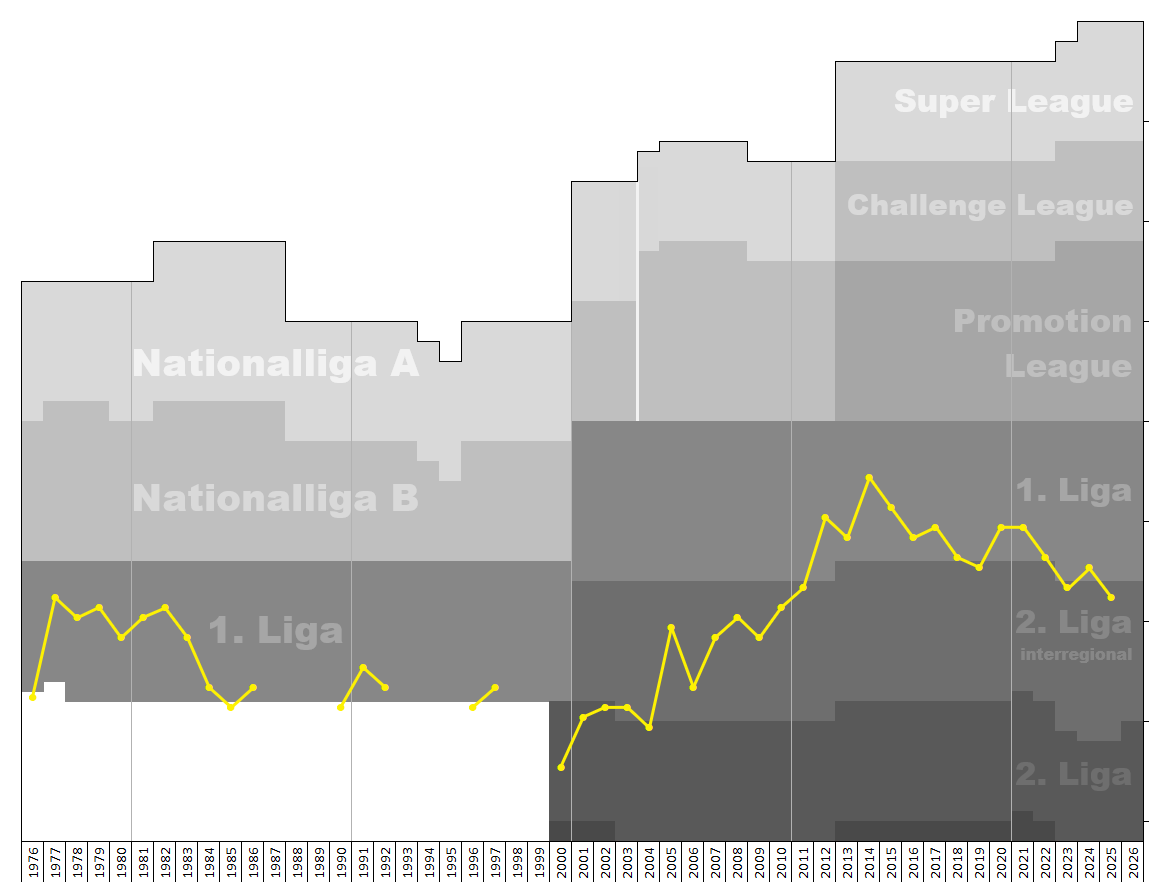
Chart of FC Balzers table positions in the Swiss football league system

== Reserve teams ==
=== FC Balzers 2 ===
FC Balzers 2 is the reserve team of FC Balzers. They currently play in the 4. Ligue (eighth tier of the Swiss football league system), and also compete in the Liechtenstein Cup.

In the 2015-16 Liechtenstein Cup, they reached the semifinals (2 rounds further than the 1st team), losing 5–3 on penalties after a 2–2 draw against FC Schaan. In the 2002-03 Liechtenstein Cup they faced the FC Balzers 1st team in the quarter-finals, with the 1st team winning 6–0 In 2022-23 Balzers 1st and 2nd team meet again in the cup semifinals, with the 1st team winning 3–0.

=== FC Balzers 3 ===
FC Balzers 3 (also known as FC Balzers 2b) was the 3rd team of FC Balzers, however as of the 2019–20 season the team no longer exists. It last competed in the 4. Liga Group 3, finishing 9th out of 10 with just 16 points. The team's final appearance in the Liechtenstein Cup was a 4–1 defeat against FC Ruggell 2.

== Honours ==
FC Balzers's former crest

- Liechtenstein Football Cup
  - Winners (11): 1963–64, 1972–73, 1978–79, 1980–81, 1981–82, 1982–83, 1983–84, 1988–89, 1990–91, 1992–93, 1996–97
  - Runners-up (17): 1973–74, 1974–75, 1976, 1979–80, 1985–86, 1991–92, 1993–94, 1998–99, 1999–2000, 2002–03, 2003–04, 2005–06, 2007–08, 2012–13, 2017–18, 2022–23, 2024–25

== European record ==
Season	Competition	Round	Opponent	Home	Away	Aggregate
1993–94	UEFA Cup Winners' Cup	Qualifying round	(Albania) Albpetrol	3–1	0–0	3–1
1993–94	UEFA Cup Winners' Cup	First round	(Bulgaria) CSKA Sofia	1–3	0–8	1–11
1997–98	UEFA Cup Winners' Cup	Qualifying round	(Hungary) BVSC Budapest	1–3	0–2	1–5

== Current squad ==
As of 1 October 2026. Note: Flags indicate national team as defined under FIFA eligibility rules; some limited exceptions apply. Players may hold more than one non-FIFA nationality.

No.	Pos.	Nation	Player
1	GK	LIE	Thomas Hobi
2	DF	SUI	Alessandro Hossmann
4	DF	SUI	Suad Gerzic
5	DF	LIE	Niklas Beck
6	DF	LIE	Severin Schlegel
7	MF	SUI	Sascha Djokic
8	MF	LIE	Fabio Wolfinger
9	FW	MKD	Mitko Gjorgjievski
10	FW	SUI	Resandan Yogarajah
11	FW	LIE	Willy Pizzi
14	MF	SUI	Santiago Cecchini

No.	Pos.	Nation	Player
17	FW	LIE	Kenny Kindle
18	DF	SUI	Tino Dietrich (captain)
20	FW	LIE	Rafael Blumenthal
21	MF	LIE	Samuel Cernadas
23	FW	MKD	Ardit Destani
25	MF	LIE	Francesco Sestito
26	DF	FRA	Samuel Prisset
27	FW	LIE	Fabio Luque-Notaro
30	GK	LIE	Lorenzo Lo Russo
34	GK	SUI	Nicola Hartmann
87	DF	SUI	Filip Degen

== Notable former players ==
- (Liechtenstein) Mario Frick
- (Germany) Rudolf Brunnenmeier
- (Germany) Michael Nushöhr
- (Liechtenstein) Thomas Beck
- (Liechtenstein) Martin Telser
- (Lesotho) Ralekoti Mokhahlane

== Former chairmen ==
- (Liechtenstein) Robi Agnolazza
- (Liechtenstein) Stefan Wolfinger
