= FC Ruggell =

Association football club in Liechtenstein

Ruggell
- Full name: Fußballclub Ruggell
- Founded: 9 March 1958; 68 years ago
- Ground: Freizeitpark Widau; Ruggell, Liechtenstein
- Capacity: 500
- Chairman: Sandro Cudazzo
- Manager: Michael Mäder
- League: 2. Liga
- 2017–18: 2. Liga, Group 1 (OFV), 4th
- Website: https://fcruggell.li/
Home colours	Away colours

FC Ruggell is a Liechtensteiner amateur football team that plays in Ruggell. They currently play in the Swiss Football League, in 2. Liga, which is the sixth tier of Swiss football. Like all Liechtensteiner clubs, they play in the Swiss football pyramid.

They have reached the final of the Liechtenstein Football Cup on 7 occasions, most recently in 2019, where they lost 3–2 against FC Vaduz.

== History ==
=== Formation and early years (1958–1970) ===
The club was founded after 10 sports enthusiasts from Ruggell met at the Gasthaus Rössle - a local Inn - at midday of 9 March 1958. The first match played under the name FC Ruggell was in the Liechtenstein Junior Tournament in Triesen, which Ruggell's Youth C-Team took place in, with their first match happening on 7 September 1958. The following year the club competed in a senior league match for the first time, spending the 1959/60 season in the Swiss 4. Liga. In 1963 the club reached the final of the Liechtenstein Cup for the first time, losing 3:1 against FC Schaan. The team won its first honour in 1970, winning the league title in 4. Liga but losing the promotion playoffs to FC Gams.

=== 3. Liga (1970–1983) ===
In 1973 Ruggell won their league once again, however this time they won their playoff matches against FC Buchs and FC Untervaz, promoting them to the 3. Liga for the first time in their history. The club remained in the 3. Liga for several years after, never getting into any promotion playoffs, however did have some success in the Swiss Cup (which clubs from Liechtenstein were allowed to participate in at the time. In 1975, they beat the second division teams of Altstätten and Rorschach but were knocked out in the third round by FC Triesen. During the 1980s Ruggell's youth teams had more success, with the youth C, D and E teams winning their competitions, however the senior team wasn't performing as well, typically finishing in the lower end of the 3. Liga table. In 1981 they reached the Liechtenstein Cup Final for the fourth time, after a 5–0 victory over Vaduz in the semi-final, but lost to FC Balzers 3–0 after extra time.

=== Playoffs and decline (1983–2000) ===
1983 was the 25th anniversary of the founding of FC Ruggell, with several sporting events done in celebration. At the end of the 1984–85 season, the club was joint on points with the league leaders FC Diepoldsau, after winning a crucial final day match against local rivals FC Schann. This meant that a final match between the two teams was scheduled to decide who had won the division, with Ruggell winning the match, giving them their first 3. Liga title and their first time in the playoffs for promotion to the 2. Liga, however they failed to get promoted. In the 1988–89 season, the club had a women's team for the first time.

In the 1994–95 season, the club was relegated back to the 4. Liga, however was promoted back to the 3. Liga the following season. The club was then promoted and relegated between these two divisions until the new millennium.

=== Recent history (2000–present) ===
In 2001 Ruggell reached the Final of the Liechtenstein Cup for the first time in 20 years, but once again they lost, this time in a 9–0 defeat to FC Vaduz. On 31 August 2002, the club's new ground - the Freizeitpark Widau - was officially opened. In 2007 the club reached the Liechtenstein Cup final for the 6th time but lost 8–0 to FC Vaduz. The team remained consistently in the 3 Liga for the rest of the 2000s and 2010s until the end of the 2015–16 season, when the club was promoted the 2. Liga for the first time. The team were the runners up of the Liechtenstein cup in 2019, having lost to FC Vaduz 3–2. On April 9, 2020, the club announced that starting from next season Michael Mäder would the club's new head coach.

== Honours ==
FC Ruggell's former crest

=== Domestic competitions ===
- Liechtenstein Football Cup
  - Runners-up (7): 1963, 1973, 1978, 1981, 2001, 2007, 2019

=== Switzerland competitions ===
- Swiss 3. Liga
  - Winners (3): 1984–85, 2015–2016
- Swiss 4. Liga
  - Winners (4): 1969–70, 1972–73, 1995–96, 1998–99

== Current squad ==
As of 28 December 2025. Note: Flags indicate national team as defined under FIFA eligibility rules; some limited exceptions apply. Players may hold more than one non-FIFA nationality.

No.	Pos.	Nation	Player
1	GK	LIE	Martin Ospelt
2	DF	LIE	Simon Maag
3	DF	LIE	Giuseppe Bellisario
4	DF	CRO	Ivan Ivic
5	MF	LIE	Riccardo Licci
6	DF	BRA	Gabriel Brilhante
7	MF	SUI	Enes Ismaili
8	MF	LIE	Michael Scherer
9	FW	CRO	Dario Ivic
10	MF	LIE	Philipp Ospelt
11	MF	LIE	Florian Allgäuer
12	GK	LIE	Gian Andri Bischof
13	FW	LIE	Collin Haas
15	MF	LIE	Valerian Scheidl
17	FW	AUT	Deniz Mujić
19	MF	LIE	Samuel Noser
20	MF	AUT	Theo Vonbrül
21	GK	AUT	Clemens Vonbrül

No.	Pos.	Nation	Player
22	MF	LIE	Benjamin Luchs
23	DF	BIH	Haris Mehmedagić
25	DF	LIE	Jonas Hilti
26	MF	SUI	Juled Ismaili
28	MF	AUT	Yildiray Ünlü
29	FW	GHA	Richard Amon
30	MF	LIE	Marlon Büchel
31	FW	LIE	Noah Biedermann
32	FW	LIE	Efe-Devran Uz
33	MF	LIE	Sandro Wieser
34	GK	AUT	Reuf Duraković
42	MF	ITA	Nevio Oliva
61	DF	LIE	Olcay Gür
66	DF	LIE	Seyhan Yildiz
70	MF	BRA	Yuri Silva
77	FW	LIE	Agim Zeqiri
90	MF	AUT	Yusuf Özüyer
