= FC Triesen =

Association football club in Liechtenstein

Triesen
- Full name: Fussballclub Triesen
- Founded: 5 June 1932; 94 years ago
- Ground: Sportanlage Blumenau; Triesen, Liechtenstein
- Capacity: 2,100
- Chairman: Edy Kindle
- League: 4. Liga
- Website: fctriesen.li
Home colours	Away colours

FC Triesen is a Liechtensteiner football club that plays in Triesen. It is one of the seven official teams in the nation, and it plays in the Swiss Football League in 3. Liga, which is the seventh tier. The team annually competes in the Liechtensteiner Cup which was won by the team 8 times in its history. Currently the team is coached by former Liechtenstein international Raphael Rohrer.

== Honours ==
- Liechtenstein Football Championship

Winners (3): 1934, 1935, 1937

- Liechtenstein Football Cup

Winners (8): 1946, 1947, 1948, 1950, 1951, 1965, 1972, 1975

Runners-up (10): 1949, 1952, 1953, 1954, 1958, 1959, 1964, 1967, 1968, 1969

== Current squad ==
As of 28 December 2025. Note: Flags indicate national team as defined under FIFA eligibility rules; some limited exceptions apply. Players may hold more than one non-FIFA nationality.

No.	Pos.	Nation	Player
1	GK	LIE	Selcuk Bicer
3	DF	LIE	Fabio Bicker
4	DF	LIE	Rafael Grünenfelder
5	DF	LIE	Fabian Bergetze
6	MF	SUI	Mike Almer
7	FW	SRB	Tritan Fejzaj
9	FW	LIE	Kilian Büchel
10	MF	ITA	Gabriele Preite
11	FW	LIE	Noah Miler
12	GK	POR	Sergio Ferreira
13	MF	TUR	Oruchan Soylu
14	MF	LIE	Patrick Bargetze
15	MF	SUI	Ramon Zogg
16	MF	LIE	Daniel Salzgeber
17	MF	LIE	Lucas Neusüss

No.	Pos.	Nation	Player
18	FW	LIE	Christian Matt
19	FW	SUI	Raphael Auer
20	MF	LIE	Dany Ferreira
21	MF	SUI	Manuel Lefèbvre
22	DF	POR	Hugo Gomes
23	MF	KOS	Ramadan Kryezi
24	MF	ITA	Andrea Mirarchi
27	FW	ITA	William Zippo
29	FW	ALG	Mohammed Ouanes
30	MF	LIE	Kevin Ferreira
—	MF	LIE	Niklas Brötz
