= FC Schaan =

Association football club in Liechtenstein

Schaan
- Full name: Fussballclub Schaan
- Founded: 1 July 1949; 76 years ago
- Ground: Sportsplatz Rheinwiese; Schaan, Liechtenstein
- Capacity: 1,500
- Chairman: Michael Winkler
- League: 4. Liga
- Website: https://fcschaan.li/
Home colours	Away colours

FC Schaan is a Liechtensteiner professional football team that plays in Schaan. The reserve team is called FC Azzurri Schaan. It is one of the seven official teams in the nation and it plays in the Swiss Football League in 4. Liga, which is the eighth tier. The team annually competes in the Liechtensteiner Cup which was won by the team 3 times in its history. The club runs its youth system in conjunction with FC Vaduz.

== Honours ==
- Liechtenstein Football Cup
  - Winners (3): 1954–55, 1962–63, 1993–94
  - Runners-up (11): 1955–56, 1956–57, 1959–60, 1960–61, 1961–62, 1964–65, 1965–66, 1969–70, 1970–71, 1992–93, 2015–16

== European record ==
Season	Competition	Round	Opponent	Home	Away	Aggregate
1994–95	UEFA Cup Winners' Cup	Qualifying round	(Bulgaria) Pirin Blagoevgrad	0–1	0–3	0–4

== FC Azzurri Schaan ==
FC Azzurri Schaan is the name of FC Schaan's reserve team.

== Current squad ==
As of 28 December 2025. Note: Flags indicate national team as defined under FIFA eligibility rules; some limited exceptions apply. Players may hold more than one non-FIFA nationality.

No.	Pos.	Nation	Player
1	GK	AUT	Mario Marinkovic
2	DF	SRB	Altin Jahiji
3	DF	LIE	Johannes Schädler
4	DF	LIE	Kieran Walser
5	DF	LIE	Noah Graber
6	DF	KOS	Ihsan Ajdari
7	MF	LIE	Lucas Eberle
8	MF	LIE	Fabio Quaderer
9	FW	LIE	Marco Oehri
10	DF	LIE	Matthias Quaderer
11	FW	LIE	Julian Hasler
13	DF	LIE	Jonas Beck

No.	Pos.	Nation	Player
14	MF	LIE	Alexander Ochsner
15	DF	SUI	Leo Loos
17	MF	LIE	Nicolas Kaiser
18	DF	LIE	Fabian Biedermann
19	FW	CRO	Matias Antunovic
20	FW	HUN	Endre Kepenyes
21	MF	LIE	Liam Kranz
23	FW	LIE	Ridvan Kardesoglu
24	FW	BIH	Nikola Gatic
28	FW	AUT	Stefan Maccani
68	GK	LIE	Jonas Strunk
97	GK	POR	Igor Miguéis
