= 2027 in Liechtenstein =

- Decades: 2000s; 2010s; 2020s
- See also: History of Liechtenstein; List of years in Liechtenstein

Events in the year 2027 in Liechtenstein.

== Events ==
- 14 March – 2027 Liechtenstein local elections
- 2 August – Solar eclipse of August 2, 2027 (partial eclipse)

== Holidays ==
- 1 January – New Year's Day
- 2 January – Saint Berchtold's Day
- 6 January – Epiphany
- 2 February – Candlemas
- 19 March – Saint Joseph's Day
- 29 March – Easter Monday
- 1 May – International Workers' Day
- 6 May – Ascension Day
- 17 May – Whit Monday
- 27 May – Corpus Christi
- 15 August – Assumption Day/National Day
- 8 September – Nativity of Mary
- 1 November – All Saints' Day
- 8 December – Immaculate Conception
- 24 December – Christmas Eve
- 25 December – Christmas Day
- 26 December – Saint Stephen's Day
- 31 December – New Year's Eve

== See also ==
- 2027 in Europe
