= Sfard =

Sfard may refer to:

== Places ==
- ספרד, the Hebrew name for Spain
- The name of the ancient city of Sardis in Lydian

== People ==
- Anna Sfard, Israeli psychologist of mathematics education, mother of Michael
- Michael Sfard, Israeli political activist, son of Anna
