= 2023 in Liechtenstein =

- Decades: 2000s; 2010s; 2020s
- See also: History of Liechtenstein; List of years in Liechtenstein

Events in the year 2023 in Liechtenstein.

== Incumbents ==
- Prince: Hans-Adam II
- Regent: Alois
- Prime Minister: Daniel Risch

== Events ==
Ongoing – COVID-19 pandemic in Liechtenstein

- 29 January – 2023 Liechtenstein constitutional referendum: Voters in Liechtenstein reject a proposed ban on casinos. The proposal, which Prince Hans-Adam II opposed, was rejected by around 73 percent of voters.

== Deaths ==
- 5 December – Prince Constantin of Liechtenstein, 51 (born 1972)

== See also ==
- COVID-19 pandemic in Europe
- 2023 in the European Union
- City states
