= Debt Mediators Australia =

Debt arbitrator

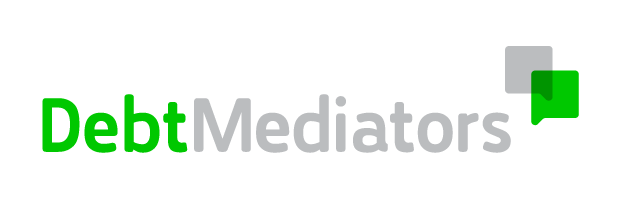
- Type: Private
- Industry: Financial services
- Founded: 1999
- Founder: Michael Paris
- Headquarters: Stafford, Australia
- Key people: Ben Paris
- Products: Debt action plans Debt agreements Personal insolvency agreements Bankruptcy Budgeting
- Services: Consumer Debt Assistance
- Website: https://www.debtmediators.com.au/

Debt Mediators Australia is an Australian company based in the financial services industry. The company was founded in 1999 by Michael Paris. The company provides debt reduction and consolidation services. Many of Debt Mediators Australia's clients are $30,000 or more in debt, and many clients are teens and people in their early twenties. Debt Mediators Australia is a registered debt agreement administrator and a member of the Personal Insolvency Professionals Association.

According to company spokesman Ben Paris, the company advises 25,000 indebted young people a year. Paris is frequently cited as an expert in Generation Y debt issues. For instance, in 44 Letters from the Liquid World by Zygmunt Bauman, Paris is quoted as saying that many "young people 'borrow way beyond their means.'" About young people drowning in debt, Paris was quoted on 60 Minutes as saying, "They're not going to be able to afford kids. They're not going to be able to afford a home, and more than likely they're going to be on a pension." The Bulletin quotes Paris as blaming a “credit-based lifestyle” for the surprising amount of debt that many people are in, in Australia. The Brisbane Times quoted Paris as saying, "Everyone's keeping up with the Joneses, but the Joneses can't even afford it."

Several of the company’s clients have been on the news--to discuss how they got in debt and how they got out of debt.
