= Liquid Love =

Liquid Love may refer to:

- Liquid Love (Freddie Hubbard album), 1975
- Liquid Love (Shy Child album), 2010
- Liquid Love (book), a 2003 book by Zygmunt Bauman
