= 2026 in Liechtenstein =

- Decades: 2000s; 2010s; 2020s
- See also: History of Liechtenstein; List of years in Liechtenstein

Events in the year 2026 in Liechtenstein.

== Incumbents ==
- Prince: Hans-Adam II
- Regent: Alois
- Prime Minister: Brigitte Haas

== Events ==
- 15 August – The House of Liechtenstein announces the amending of the royal succession law, allowing for women to become prince of Liechtenstein beginning with the heirs of Hereditary Prince Alois.

== Holidays ==
- 1 January – New Year's Day
- 2 January – Saint Berchtold's Day
- 6 January – Epiphany
- 2 February – Candlemas
- 19 March – Saint Joseph's Day
- 6 April – Easter Monday
- 1 May – International Workers' Day
- 14 May – Ascension Day
- 25 May – Whit Monday
- 4 June – Corpus Christi
- 15 August – Assumption Day/National Day
- 8 September – Nativity of Mary
- 1 November – All Saints' Day
- 8 December – Immaculate Conception
- 24 December – Christmas Eve
- 25 December – Christmas Day
- 26 December – Saint Stephen's Day
- 31 December – New Year's Eve

== Deaths ==
- September 5 – Klaus Wanger, 85, member (1993–2009) and president (2001–2009) of the Landtag of Liechtenstein

== See also ==
- 2026 in Europe
