= Michael Sfard =

Israeli lawyer and activist (born 1972)

- מיכאל סְפַרְד
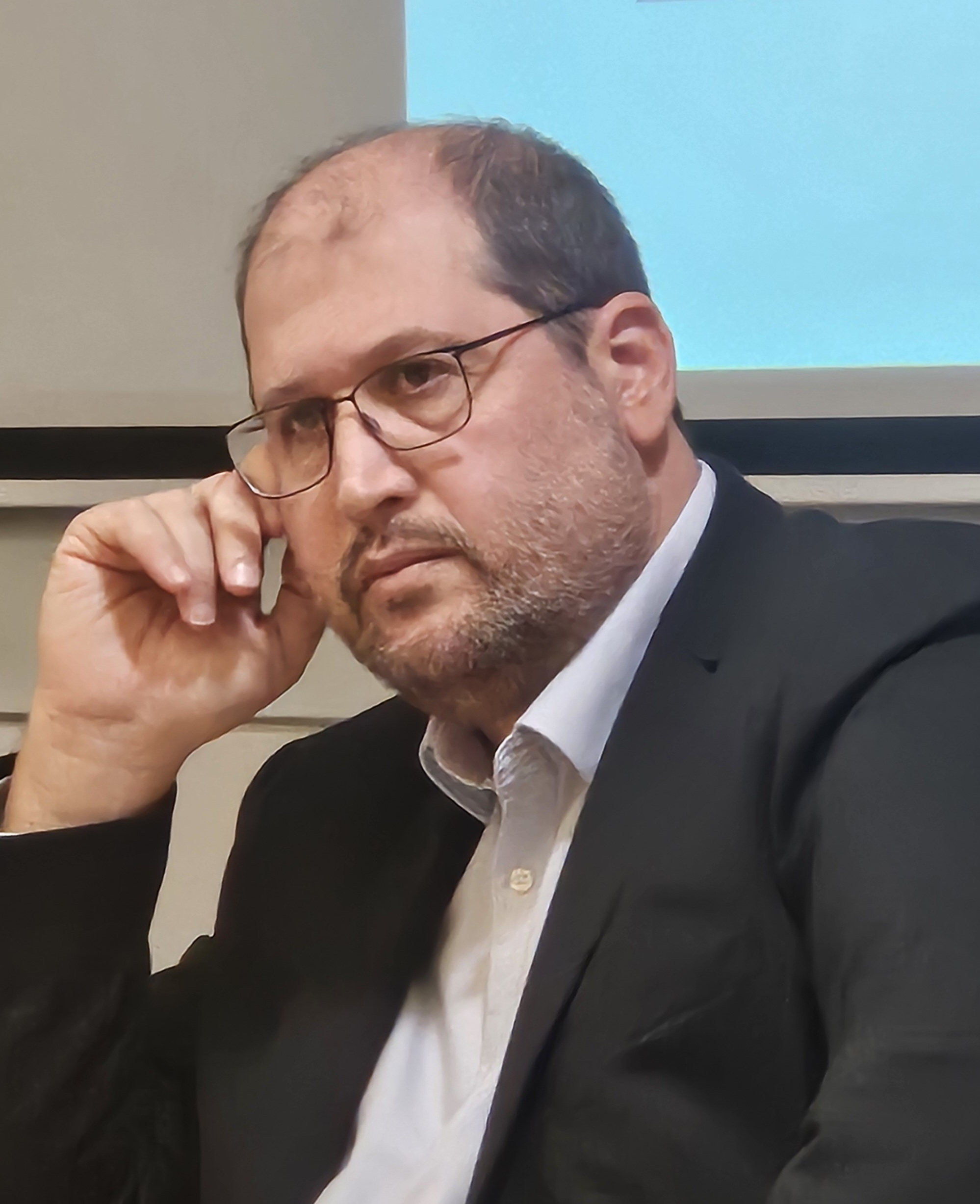
- Sfard in 2025
- Born: April 21, 1972 (age 54); Kiryat HaYovel, Jerusalem
- Education: Hebrew University of Jerusalem (LLB); University College London (LLM)
- Occupations: International human rights lawyer and activist
- Parents: Leon Sfard (father); Anna Sfard (mother)
- Awards: Sami Michael Award (2024)
- Website: sfard.co.il

Michael Sfard (Hebrew: מיכאל סְפַרְד; born 1972) is an Israeli lawyer and political activist specializing in international human rights law and the laws of war. He has served as counsel in various cases on these topics in Israel. Sfard has represented a variety of Israeli and Palestinian human rights and peace organizations, movements and activists at the Israeli Supreme Court.

== Life and work ==
Michael Sfard was born in 1972 in the Rehov Brazil public housing complex in Kiryat HaYovel, Jerusalem to mathematician Leon Sfard and University of Haifa professor Anna Sfard. Sfard is the grandson of Holocaust survivor and sociologist Zygmunt Bauman and writer Janina Bauman.

Sfard's parents were expelled from Poland in 1968 for their involvement in the University of Warsaw student uprisings. When he was five, his family moved to an apartment building in Ma'alot Dafna that was home to many journalists.

Sfard attended the Hebrew University of Jerusalem and was awarded a Bachelor of Laws (LLB) upon completion of his studies. He later earned as Master of Laws (LLM) from University College London. He completed his legal apprenticeship under Avigdor Feldman and worked with him for several years as an attorney.

Sfard served in the Nahal Brigade of the Israel Defense Forces (IDF) in Lebanon as a military paramedic. While in law school, Sfard served as a reservist in the IDF in the Gaza Strip.According to Sfard, before his reserve duty in Gaza, he believed "left-wing soldiers" should agree to patrol the Palestinian territories "to stop bad things from happening" rather than be conscientious objectors.

While serving in Gaza his views changed and in a later reservist session, Sfard refused to serve on the grounds of being a conscientious objector. As a result, he spent three weeks in military prison due to his refusal to serve as escort for Israeli settlers in Hebron. He was released from the army in 1994 and attended a course on Jewish-Arab encounters at Neve Shalom.

In 2000, Sfard and his wife moved to London so that he could pursue a master's degree and to also "to get away" from Israel. He studied international human rights law and "discovered the subject [he] wanted to work in" before returning to Israel the following year stating that emigration from Israel was "a tragedy."

Shortly after his return to Israel, Sfard attended the first conference of the group Courage to Refuse. "saw 200 people who thought and felt like [he] did", and decided to be an activist. In early 2004, Sfard opened his own office in Tel Aviv.

Sfard has described Shulamit Aloni as a "major influence" who introduced him through her activities to the world of human rights in Israel.

Sfard's has expressed his views on the role the media play in his work. He feels that "the media are an important part of the work. They are a tool." In addition, he said that media can influence or create the debate. But, he also said that "I, as any lawyer, have a fear of cameras entering the sanctified zone between the lawyer and the client."

Articles by Sfard have been published by Haaretz, The Independent and The Observer.

=== Legal activities ===
Sfard has represented a variety of Israeli and Palestinian human rights and peace organizations, movements and activists at the Israeli Supreme Court. His clients are "mostly Palestinians who live in the West Bank and need permits to come into Israel."

According to the New York Times, he has brought many cases to challenge the Israeli occupation of the Palestinian territories, represented hundreds of Israeli soldiers who have refused to serve, with the work mostly being financed "by Israel's premier left-wing nonprofit organizations, which in turn are financed in part by European governments". Sfard and his law office provide legal counsel for Yesh Din. Sfard is legal counsel for Peace Now.

Sfard has supported legal causes such as:

- A group of Israeli Human Rights organizations that petitioned the High Court against the IDF's decision to reduce the size of the humanitarian "safety zone" during bombardments of Gaza in 2004.
- Litigation on behalf of the Israeli human rights organization HaMoked, against the "permit system" which governs the area between the separation fence and the 1949 armistice line.
- Represented Peace Now in a petition against settlement outposts. Sfard litigated the cases advocating for the demolition of houses and the evacuation of settlers from the outposts of Amona and Migron.
- Represented Brian Avery of the International Solidarity Movement, who was injured by IDF soldiers during the course of his activities in Jenin. Avery accepted a settlement for NIS 600,000 (US$150,000) from the state of Israel in exchange for dropping the lawsuit.
- Represented 17 Bedouins, who lived near Beer Sheva, claiming the land they were on, including Al-Araqeeb, belonged to them rather than to the State of Israel. The judge ruled in favor of the State saying that the land was not "assigned to the plaintiffs, nor held by them under conditions required by law" and that they still had to "prove their rights to the land by proof of its registration in the Tabu". Furthermore, the judge said that the Bedouin knew they were supposed to register, but didn't, saying "although the complainants are not entitled to compensation, it has been willing to negotiate with them…it is a shame that these negotiations did not reach any agreement." The court ordered the Bedouins to pay legal costs of NIS 50,000.
- Represented Jonathan (Yoni) Ben Artzi who refused to enlist for military service. Ben Artzi considered himself a pacifist and total conscientious objector and therefore objected to serving in the army in any capacity.

== Reception ==
The New York Times described Sfard as "the left’s leading lawyer in Israel".

The New America Foundation described Sfard as "Israel's pre-eminent legal expert on settlements and the challenges posed by the broader infrastructure of Israeli occupation to the daily life of Palestinians, to the two-state solution, to American policy and to Israel's democracy" and "Israel's most respected human rights lawyer".

In 2011, a settler from Kiryat Arba was indicted after calling for Sfard's assassination in an Internet posting.

Israeli Knesset Member Danny Danon of the right-wing Likud party has accused Sfard of "trying to bypass democracy" through leveraging the Israeli "legal system [to promote ideas] because his ideas are not welcome in Israeli society." Similarly, Gerald Steinberg, president of NGO Monitor, said that Sfard "sees the courts as the way to force the changes that he perceives as necessary for Israel, [b]ut he doesn't convince the Israeli public."

Naftali Balanson, Managing Editor of NGO Monitor, said Sfard "is at the center of the NGO industry that exploits the rhetoric of human rights in the context of the Arab-Israeli conflict."

== Books ==
- Hanin, Dov; Sfard, Michael; Rotbard, Sharon, eds. (2004). משפטי הסרבנים: התובע הצבאי נגד חגי מטר, מתן קמינר, שמרי צמרת, אדם מאור, נעם בהט ; התובע הצבאי נגד יונתן בן ארצי [The Refusenik Trials: The Military Prosecution of Hagai Matar, Matan Kaminer, Noam Bahat Shimri Tsameret, Adam Maor. The Military Prosecution of Yonatan Ben-Artzi] (in Hebrew). Tel Aviv: Babel.
- Klingberg, Marcus; Sfard, Michael (2007). המרגל האחרון [The Last Spy] (in Hebrew). Tel Aviv: Ma'ariv Library.
- Arieli, Shaul; Sfard, Michael (2008). חומה ומחדל: גדר ההפרדה, ביטחון או חמדנות [The Wall of Folly] (in Hebrew). Tel Aviv: Yedioth Books.
- Sfard, Michael (2018). The Wall and the Gate: Israel, Palestine, and the Legal Battle for Human Rights. Henry Holt and Company. ISBN 9781250122711.
- Ben-Naftali, Orna; Sfard, Michael; Viterbo, Hedi (2018). The ABC of the OPT: A Legal Lexicon of the Israeli Control over the Occupied Palestinian Territory. Cambridge, United Kingdom: Cambridge University Press. ISBN 9781107156524.
