= 2021 in Liechtenstein =

- Decades: 2000s; 2010s; 2020s
- See also: History of Liechtenstein; List of years in Liechtenstein

Events in the year 2021 in Liechtenstein.

== Incumbents ==
- Prince: Hans-Adam II
- Regent: Alois
- Prime Minister: Adrian Hasler (until 25 March), Daniel Risch (from 25 March)

== Events ==
Ongoing – COVID-19 pandemic in Liechtenstein

- 7 February – The 2021 Liechtenstein general election were held, electing 25 members of the Landtag.
- 25 March – Daniel Risch became the nation's 14th Prime Minister after taking over the position from Adrian Hasler.
- 25 May – The 2020–21 Liechtenstein Cup semifinals and finals were canceled due scheduling reasons.

== Sports ==
=== 2021–22 Liechtenstein Cup ===
==== First Round ====
- 28 September
  - FC Vaduz III 1 – 3 FC Balzers II
  - FC Schaan II 5 – 4 FC Triesen II
  - FC Ruggell II 2 – 2 (5 – 4 p) USV Eschen/Mauren II
- 29 September
  - FC Triesenberg II 0 – 1 USV Eschen/Mauren III

==== Second Round ====
- 29 October
  - FC Ruggell II 2 – 0 USV Eschen/Mauren III
- 2 November
  - FC Schaan II 0 – 6 FC Triesen
- 3 November
  - FC Balzers II 0 – 2 FC Vaduz II
- 10 November
  - FC Triesenberg 1 – 2 FC Schaan

== Deaths ==
- 28 March – Dieter Walch, 81, paediatrician and politician (b. 1940)
- 16 July – Rudolf Lampert, 65, politician (b. 1956)
- 21 August – Marie, Princess of Liechtenstein, 81 (b. 1940)
- 28 December – Herbert Hilbe, 83, politician (b. 1938)

== See also ==
- COVID-19 pandemic in Europe
- 2021 in Europe
