= 2022 in Liechtenstein =

- Decades: 2000s; 2010s; 2020s
- See also: History of Liechtenstein; List of years in Liechtenstein

Events in the year 2022 in Liechtenstein.

== Incumbents ==
- Prince: Hans-Adam II
- Regent: Alois
- Prime Minister: Daniel Risch

== Events ==
Ongoing – COVID-19 pandemic in Liechtenstein

- 4 April – Russia restricts diplomats, journalists, and politicians from the European Union, Iceland, Norway, Switzerland, and Liechtenstein from obtaining a visa by a simplified procedure.
- 20 May – A heat wave sweeps Western Europe, with settlements in France, Switzerland, Liechtenstein and western Austria beating all-time high records for the month.
- 26 June – A referendum was held in which voters decided on an exemption for pensioners from paying the annual deductible of the national health insurance.
- 18 September – A referendum was held in which votes decided against maintaining COVID-19 restrictions.

== Sports ==
=== 2022–23 Liechtenstein Cup ===
==== Round of 16 ====
- 16 August
  - FC Vaduz III 1 – 6 FC Schaan
  - FC Ruggell II 1 – 1 (a.e.t.) (4 - 5 p) FC Vaduz II
  - FC Triesenberg 5 – 3 FC Triesen
  - USV Eschen/Mauren II 0 - 9 FC Balzers
- 17 August
  - FC Ruggell 1 - 4 USV Eschen/Mauren
  - FC Schaan II 3 - 7 USV Eschen/Mauren III
  - FC Triesenberg II 1 - 4 FC Balzers II
- 31 August
  - FC Triesen II 0 - 18 FC Vaduz

==== Quarterfinals ====
- 20 September
  - USV Eschen Mauren III - FC Valduz
- 11 October
  - FC Balzers II - FC Schaan
- 12 October
  - FC Vaduz II - FC Balzers
  - FC Triesenberg - USV Eschen/Mauren

== See also ==
- 2022 in Europe
