= 2017 in Europe =

This is a list of events that took place in Europe in 2017.

Incumbents
| Country | Flag | Main Article |
|---|---|---|
| Albania | (Albania) | 2017 in Albania |
| Azerbaijan | (Azerbaijan) | 2017 in Azerbaijan |
| Belarus | (Belarus) | 2017 in Belarus |
| Belgium | (Belgium) | 2017 in Belgium |
| Bosnia and Herzegovina | (Bosnia and Herzegovina) | 2017 in Bosnia and Herzegovina |
| Bulgaria | (Bulgaria) | 2017 in Bulgaria |
| Croatia | (Croatia) | 2017 in Croatia |
| Czech Republic | (Czech Republic) | 2017 in the Czech Republic |
| Cyprus | (Cyprus) | 2017 in Cyprus |
| Denmark | (Denmark) | 2017 in Denmark |
| Estonia | (Estonia) | 2017 in Estonia |
| European Union | (European Union) | 2017 in the European Union |
| Finland | (Finland) | 2017 in Finland |
| France | (France) | 2017 in France |
| Germany | (Germany) | 2017 in Germany |
| Georgia | (Georgia (country)) | 2017 in Georgia |
| Greece | (Greece) | 2017 in Greece |
| Hungary | (Hungary) | 2017 in Hungary |
| Iceland | (Iceland) | 2017 in Iceland |
| Ireland | (Republic of Ireland) | 2017 in Ireland |
| Italy | (Italy) | 2017 in Italy |
| Latvia | (Latvia) | 2017 in Latvia |
| Liechtenstein | (Liechtenstein) | 2017 in Liechtenstein |
| Lithuania | (Lithuania) | 2017 in Lithuania |
| Luxembourg | (Luxembourg) | 2017 in Luxembourg |
| Malta | (Malta) | 2017 in Malta |
| Moldova | (Moldova) | 2017 in Moldova |
| Monaco | (Monaco) | 2017 in Monaco |
| Netherlands | (Netherlands) | 2017 in the Netherlands |
| North Macedonia | (North Macedonia) | 2017 in North Macedonia |
| Norway | (Norway) | 2017 in Norway |
| Poland | (Poland) | 2017 in Poland |
| Portugal | (Portugal) | 2017 in Portugal |
| Romania | (Romania) | 2017 in Romania |
| Russia | (Russia) | 2017 in Russia |
| Serbia | (Serbia) | 2017 in Serbia |
| Slovakia | (Slovakia) | 2017 in Slovakia |
| Slovenia | (Slovenia) | 2017 in Slovenia |
| Spain | (Spain) | 2017 in Spain |
| Sweden | (Sweden) | 2017 in Sweden |
| Switzerland | (Switzerland) | 2017 in Switzerland |
| Turkey | (Turkey) | 2017 in Turkey |
| Ukraine | (Ukraine) | 2017 in Ukraine |
| United Kingdom | (United Kingdom) | 2017 in the United Kingdom |

== Events ==
=== January ===
- January 1 – At least 39 people are killed in an attack on a nightclub in Istanbul.
- January 5 – A cold wave across Europe leaves at least 61 dead, including several migrants and homeless people.
- January 18 – 30 people are missing and feared dead after an avalanche buries a small hotel in the mountains of central Italy, following a series of earthquakes.
- January 20 – At least 16 people are killed and about 40 injured after a bus carrying Hungarian students crashes and bursts into flames on a highway in northern Italy.

=== February ===
- February 2 – The European Parliament unanimously approves visa-free regime in the Schengen Area for Georgia.
- February 5 – In the largest protest since the 1989 Revolution, an estimated 600,000 people rally in main Romanian cities against a Government Ordinance decriminalizing some graft offenses.
- February 12 – Former foreign minister Frank-Walter Steinmeier is elected Germany's president.
- February 24 – Slovenia permits same-sex marriages for the first time under a law giving gay couples largely the same rights as heterosexuals though barring them from jointly adopting children.

=== March ===
- March 2 – A methane gas explosion kills eight miners and injures six in western Ukraine.
- March 9 – Donald Tusk is re-elected as President of the European Council despite opposition from his home country, Poland.
- March 13 – János Áder is re-elected for a second five-year term as President of Hungary by the country's parliament during a secret vote.
- March 15 – Mark Rutte's centre-right VVD wins Dutch general election, positioning him for a third successive term as prime minister.
- March 16 – Turkey's Minister of the Interior Süleyman Soylu threatens to send to Europe, 15,000 refugees a month.
- March 22 – Three people die and at least 40 are injured after an attacker drives a car along a pavement in Westminster, stabs a policeman and is shot dead by police in the grounds of Parliament.

=== April ===
- April 2 – Conservative Prime Minister Aleksandar Vučić wins Serbia's presidential election by a huge margin.
- April 3 – An explosion on a train carriage in Saint Petersburg's underground metro kills at least 14 people and injures dozens more.
- April 7 – Five people die and 14 are seriously injured after a hijacked truck ploughs into a shopping centre during a terrorist attack in Stockholm.
- April 16 – Turkish President Recep Tayyip Erdoğan and the country's prime minister declare victory in a referendum designed to hand Erdoğan sweeping powers.
- April 28 – Ilir Meta is voted in as President of Albania amid an opposition boycott.
- April 29 – Turkey blocks access to Wikipedia, citing a law that allows the government to ban certain websites for the protection of the public.

=== May ===
- May 7 – Emmanuel Macron wins French presidential election over rival Marine Le Pen.
- May 13 – Portugal's Salvador Sobral wins the grand final of the Eurovision Song Contest 2017 with his song "Amar pelos dois".
- May 22 – 22 people are killed and hundreds are injured when a suicide bomber attacks concertgoers at Manchester Arena.

=== June ===
- June 3
  - Seven people are killed and 48 injured in a terrorist attack in London after assailants use a vehicle to plow into pedestrians on London Bridge and attack others with knives in nearby Borough Market.
  - More than 1,500 people are injured after Juventus fans watching the Champions League final stampede in a Turin square after mistaking firecrackers for an explosion or gunshots.
  - Malta's Prime Minister Joseph Muscat wins a second five-year term in office in early general elections.
- June 5 – Montenegro becomes the 29th member of NATO.
- June 8 – British Prime Minister Theresa May's Conservative wins the parliamentary elections but falls short of a majority.
- June 14
  - At least 79 people are dead or missing and presumed dead in London's Grenfell Tower fire.
  - Leo Varadkar becomes Ireland's first openly gay Taoiseach.
- June 17 – A raging forest fire envelops a stretch of road in central Portugal, killing at least 61 people, including about 30 motorists who are trapped in their cars.
- June 18 – Emmanuel Macron's La République En Marche! wins absolute majority in French parliamentary elections.
- June 27 - 2017 cyberattacks on Ukraine
- June 29 – Serbian parliament elects the new government of Prime Minister Ana Brnabić, the first woman and first openly gay person to hold the office.
- June 30 – German lawmakers vote by a wide margin to legalize same-sex marriage, a landmark decision which comes just days after Chancellor Angela Merkel drops her longstanding opposition to a free vote on the issue.

=== August ===
- 17 August - 2017 Barcelona attack

=== September ===
- 24 September – 2017 German federal election
  - The (CDU/CSU), led by incumbent chancellor Angela Merkel, wins the highest percentage of the vote with 33%, though it suffered a large swing against it of more than 8%.
  - The Social Democratic Party of Germany (SPD) achieved its worst result since post-war Germany at 21%.
  - The Alternative for Germany (AfD), which was previously unrepresented in the Bundestag, became the third largest party in the Bundestag with 12.6% of the vote. It was the first time since 1957 that a party to the political right of the CDU/CSU gained seats in the Bundestag.

=== October ===
- October - Austria bans the face-covering Islamic burka.

== Deaths ==
=== January ===
- 1 January
  - Tony Atkinson, Welsh economist (b. 1944)
  - Derek Parfit, English philosopher (b. 1942)
- 2 January
  - John Berger, English art critic, novelist, painter and poet (b. 1926)
  - Viktor Tsaryov, Russian footballer (b. 1931)
- 3 January – Igor Volk, Ukrainian-born Russian cosmonaut and test pilot (b. 1937)
- 4 January
  - Ezio Pascutti, Italian footballer (b. 1937)
  - Georges Prêtre, French conductor (b. 1924)
- 7 January – Mário Soares, 17th President and 105th Prime Minister of Portugal (b. 1924)
- 8 January – Peter Sarstedt, English singer, instrumentalist and songwriter (b. 1941)
- 9 January – Zygmunt Bauman, Polish sociologist and philosopher (b. 1925)
- 10 January
  - Roman Herzog, President of Germany (b. 1934)
  - Oliver Smithies, English-born American geneticist and physical biochemist (b. 1925)
- 11 January – François Van der Elst, Belgian footballer (b. 1954)
- 12 January
  - Giulio Angioni, Italian writer and anthropologist (b. 1939)
  - Graham Taylor, English footballer and manager (b. 1944)
- 13 January
  - Gilberto Agustoni, Swiss prelate of the Roman Catholic Church (b. 1922)
  - Lord Snowdon, English photographer and filmmaker (b. 1930)

== See also ==
- 2017 in the European Union
- List of state leaders in 2017 § Europe
