= 2007 in Liechtenstein =

- Decades: 1980s; 1990s; 2000s; 2010s; 2020s
- See also: History of Liechtenstein; List of years in Liechtenstein

Events in the year 2007 in Liechtenstein.

== Incumbents ==
- Prince: Hans-Adam II
- Regent: Alois
- Prime Minister: Otmar Hasler

== Events ==
- 28 January – The 2007 Liechtenstein local elections take place, which elected the municipal councils and mayors of the eleven municipalities.
- February – Hundreds of people, mainly from the nations of Somalia and Eritrea, attempt to seek asylum in the nation. Border guards are stationed on the Switzerland and Austria border to combat the number of incoming asylum seekers, with the main objective of maintaining law and order for all Liechtensteiners. This measure lasts for about 90 days, with over 800 people seeking asylum in the nation in this time.
- 1 March – A company of 171 Swiss soldiers mistakenly enter the nation during a training exercise due to bad weather conditions.
- 1 July – The nations first two consuls are appointed to represent Liechtenstein in the United States with one in Macon, Georgia and the other in Los Angeles, California.

== Sports ==
=== 2006–07 Liechtenstein Cup ===
==== Semi-finals ====
- 7 April – USV Eschen/Mauren II 0 - 2 FC Ruggell
- 11 April – FC Vaduz 3 – 1 USV Eschen/Mauren

==== Finals ====
- 1 May – FC Vaduz 8 – 0 FC Ruggell

=== 2007–08 Liechtenstein Cup ===
==== First round ====
- 11 August
  - FC Ruggell II 0 – 1 FC Balzers III
  - FC Triesenberg II 0 – 6 FC Schaan II
- 12 August – FC Vaduz III 1 – 5 FC Triesen
- 22 August – FC Triesen II 0 – 2 FC Vaduz II

==== Second round ====
- 18 September
  - FC Balzers II 2 – 1 FC Triesenberg
  - FC Triesen 0 – 4 FC Schaan
- 19 September
  - FC Balzers III 0 – 6 FC Schaan II
  - FC Vaduz II 0 – 10 FC Balzers

==== Quarter-finals ====
- 23 October – FC Schaan II 0 – 5 FC Vaduz
- 30 October – FC Ruggell 1 – 0 FC Balzers II
- 31 October – FC Schaan 1 – 4 USV Eschen/Mauren
- 7 November – USV Eschen/Mauren II 0 – 8 FC Balzers

=== UEFA Euro 2008 qualifying ===
- 24 March – Liechtenstein 1 – 4 Northern Ireland
- 28 March – Liechtenstein 1 – 0 Latvia
- 2 June – Iceland 1 – 1 Liechtenstein
- 6 June – Liechtenstein 0 – 2 Spain
- 22 August – Northern Ireland 3 – 1 Liechtenstein
- 12 September – Denmark 4 – 0 Liechtenstein
- 13 October – Liechtenstein 0 – 3 Sweden
- 17 October – Liechtenstein 3 – 0 Iceland
- 17 November – Latvia 4 – 1 Liechtenstein

== See also ==
- 2007 in Europe
- City states
