= Commognition =

Theory of thinking and learning as forms of communication

Commognition is a theory of thinking and learning in learning sciences research, introduced by Anna Sfard in her 2008 book. It is a portmanteau of communication and cognition as if thinking is a person's communication with themselves. She proposes that individual cognition and interpersonal communication are two forms of a single phenomenon rather than distinct processes. She claims that mathematics, as any other domain of knowing, is a historically established discourse, and learning mathematics is the process of becoming a participant in that discourse. Commognition developed from Sfard's 1998 distinction between "acquisition" and "participation" metaphors for learning, an article that became one of the most cited in educational research. The framework has been taken up and extended by mathematics education researchers, but also in chemistry, physics, science, statistics and teacher education, and a 2025 synthesis of Scopus-indexed studies reported that its use has grown since 2020.

== Development ==
The framework's immediate precursor is Sfard's 1998 article "On two metaphors for learning and the dangers of choosing just one", in which she argued that theories of learning divide between an acquisition metaphor, in which learning is the accumulation of possessions such as concepts and schemes, and a participation metaphor, in which it is a matter of becoming a member of a community, and that neither metaphor can be relied on alone. The article circulated widely outside mathematics education, and Sfard returned to its distinction in 2025 to assess what the participation metaphor had yielded over the intervening four decades. Sfard developed commognition in response to what she described as weaknesses in twentieth-century theories of human development. In her account, "acquisitionist" schools such as behaviorism and cognitivism conceptualized learning as the acquisition of entities (behaviors, concepts, mental schemes) and, because they attended only to the individual, could not explain historical change in human ways of acting. "Participationist" thinkers following Lev Vygotsky instead described human learning as growing participation in historically established forms of activity. Commognition, Sfard wrote, took this line one step further by treating domains of knowing, mathematics among them, as discursive activities—a move she traced to two sources: the arguments of Vygotsky and Ludwig Wittgenstein against separating thought from its expression, and postmodern philosophers, among them Lyotard, Foucault and Rorty, who described science and knowledge-building as discourse.

The term appeared in Sfard's publications in the early 2000s and was fully outlined in Thinking as Communicating (2008). In the book's introduction, Sfard located the project's beginnings in puzzles from her research on mathematics learning: systematic student errors, young children's non-standard handling of numbers, and the failure of decades of reform to improve mathematics learning in any lasting way. She argued that such puzzles could not be resolved without operationally defined concepts to replace the ambiguous everyday vocabulary of thinking and learning. The first part of the book presents the general theory of thinking as communicating. The second applies it to mathematics.

Thinking as Communicating
- First edition (hardback) cover
- Author: Anna Sfard
- Language: English
- Series: Learning in Doing: Social, Cognitive and Computational Perspectives
- Subject: Mathematics education, thinking, developmental psychology
- Genre: Non-fiction
- Publisher: Cambridge University Press
- Publication date: 21 January 2008
- Publication place: United Kingdom
- Media type: Print (hardcover and paperback), e-book
- Pages: 324
- ISBN: 978-0-521-86737-5 (hardback)
- OCLC: 125402253
- Dewey Decimal: 153
- LC Class: QA42 .S43 2008

Sfard continued developing the approach after 2008. In a 2018 chapter, she framed commognition as a research discourse defined by its keywords, its data, its methods of analysis and its endorsed claims, and summarized the storylines that commognitive research had by then produced, including accounts of how numerical, algebraic and functional discourses develop in learners and of how identity-building talk interacts with mathematical activity. With Man Ching Esther Chan, she later compared problem-solving dialogues recorded twenty-five years apart in Montreal and Melbourne, using the comparison to develop commognitive methods for analyzing why opportunities to learn are sometimes not taken up.

In a 2025 article, Sfard returned to the distinction with which the project had begun—the contrast she had drawn in 1998 between the acquisition and participation metaphors for learning—and set out the vocabulary her group had arrived at after almost three decades of work. The paper replaced the noun "activity" with "practice", defined as a network of interconnected routines together with the range of situations in which they apply, and presented routines and practices as the framework's units of analysis, in place of the "knowledge" and "concepts" of acquisitionist research. It also proposed a hypothetical five-step action cycle—recognize, simulate, select, interpret, perform—that connects the framework to neuroscientific research on prediction and simulation and is intended to explain why human performance varies from one situation to another.

Sfard received the Hans Freudenthal Medal of the International Commission on Mathematical Instruction for 2007, and the award citation summed up her research program in one term, commognition, which she had coined to dissolve "the classical dichotomy between communication and cognition". Sfard wrote the entry on commognition in the second edition of the Encyclopedia of Mathematics Education, and the International Commission on Mathematical Instruction devoted a unit of its Awardees Multimedia Online Resources project, created and recorded by Sfard, to "Learning, Commognition and Mathematics".

== Framework ==
The theory's point of departure is a definition: thinking is "the individualized version of interpersonal communication," a communicative interaction in which one person plays the parts of all interlocutors, and which need not proceed in words. Sfard presented this as a non-dualist position that rejects the form-content dichotomy and the Cartesian split between the bodily and the mental. She derived it from Vygotsky's claim that uniquely human capacities originate in historically established collective activities: if thinking is such a capacity, its collective predecessor must be interpersonal communication. Because thinking and communicating are taken to be one kind of process, the theory holds that both can be investigated with a single set of analytic tools.

Within this vocabulary, mathematics is a discourse: a form of communication made distinct by four characteristics. These are its keywords, such as "three", "set" or "function"; its visual mediators, such as numerals, algebraic symbols and graphs; its routines, the patterned ways in which characteristic tasks such as defining or proving are performed; and its endorsed narratives, the theorems, definitions and computational rules that the community of the discourse accepts as true. Learning mathematics is accordingly defined as individualizing mathematical discourse: gradually becoming able to use the discourse agentively, in response to one's own needs.

The model sets mathematics apart from most other discourses in one respect: Sfard described it as autopoietic, a discourse that creates the very objects its participants talk about. New mathematical objects arise, on this account, through objectification, the introduction of nouns that come to be understood as names for new discourse-independent objects. Sfard identified three discursive devices at work: saming, giving a common name to things previously seen as unrelated; encapsulating, replacing talk about many objects with talk about a single entity such as a set; and reifying, turning talk about a process (adding 5 to 7) into talk about an object (the sum of 5 and 7). A new noun then undergoes what she called alienation: it comes to be used in impersonal statements, as if its referent existed independently of the discourse.

Routines occupy a central place in the theory. Sfard analyzed a routine as a pair consisting of a task (the performer's vision of what must be repeated from precedent situations, where a precedent is a past event deemed similar to the present one) and a procedure (the prescription for action, deduced from what was done in the precedent events). The same procedure can ground different kinds of routines depending on how the performer sees the task: in explorations, the goal is producing an endorsed narrative; in rituals, the performer recapitulates others' actions for the sake of social approval rather than for any product. Most routines, Sfard held, fall between the two poles, and learning often takes the form of deritualization, in which the performer's attention gradually shifts from the performance itself to its outcome and the routine becomes more flexible and better connected to other routines.

The theory distinguishes two kinds of discursive change. Object-level learning extends the stock of endorsed narratives about existing objects. Meta-level learning changes the meta-rules of the discourse itself, as happens when the integers are extended to rational numbers, and some old truths, such as "multiplication makes bigger", cease to hold. The new discourse may be incommensurable with its predecessor, and encounters between incommensurable discourses produce what Sfard termed commognitive conflict. Such a conflict becomes an opportunity for learning, she proposed, only under a "learning-teaching agreement" in which participants concur on which discourse leads, who teaches and who learns, and what the process should look like. Because newcomers cannot yet judge the outcomes of the new discourse, meta-level learning is, on this account, bound to begin with rituals.

Commognitive research takes discourse, rather than the individual mind, as the object of inquiry. Its data are recordings and verbatim transcripts of interaction, and the analyst is required to alternate between an insider's and an outsider's perspective on the discourse under study.

=== Subjectifying and identity ===
Alongside mathematizing (talking about mathematical objects) participants in a mathematics classroom are engaged in subjectifying, an overt or covert talk about the participants themselves. Where subjectifying takes the form of stories about a learner's enduring properties rather than about her actions, Sfard calls it identifying. With Anna Prusak she operationalized identity as a set of "reifying, significant, endorsable stories about a person", and cast learning as an effort to close the gap between a current identity and a designated identity.

Because this definition makes identity a species of discursive construct, it brings the social and emotional dimensions of learning within reach of the same analytic tools the framework applies to cognition, rather than leaving them to a separate theory. Sfard and Einat Heyd-Metzuyanim accordingly described learning mathematics as an interplay of mathematizing and identifying, and argued that identity-constituting narratives (labelling a student "weak", for instance) tend to function as self-fulfilling prophecies with long-term effects on learning. Heyd-Metzuyanim used the framework to trace how a "disabled mathematical identity" is co-constructed in teacher–student interaction, and how cycles of identifying and mathematizing can reinforce one another into mathematical failure. Sfard set out the position at length in 2019, defending stories as the appropriate unit for identity research.

Mellony Graven and Heyd-Metzuyanim called the 2005 article "incredibly influential in the field of mathematics education", but reminded that comparatively few of the many papers citing it actually adopt its operationalization of identity as reifying, endorsable and significant stories. The two later surveyed the strand in the Fourth International Handbook of Mathematics Education.

=== Culture, language and practical activity ===
A line of commognitive research addresses the cultural embeddedness of learning, on the premise that any mathematical discourse, "when taught in different institutional or cultural settings, may give rise to different learning processes". Dong-Joong Kim, Joan Ferrini-Mundy and Sfard compared how English-speaking and Korean-speaking university students talk about infinity, using the two languages' different resources to ask how language bears on mathematical thinking. Noah Morris analyzed Tongan-language narratives about uncertainty and concluded that a discourse of probability is close to superfluous in everyday Tongan communication. Sfard asked the same question of Chinese in a 2022 letter on fraction lessons taught in English schools under the Chinese "Shanghai model", where teachers rejected diagrams not partitioned into equal parts. The character 分 (fēn), which appears in the name of every Chinese fraction, can serve as both noun and verb, and she conjectured that a fraction is read in Chinese as a prescription for the act of partitioning as well as a name for its product, so that the judgments that had puzzled observers expressed a coherent mathematical discourse rather than unquestioning rule-following. Sfard and Prusak's study of a single Israeli classroom containing recent immigrants from the former Soviet Union alongside native Israelis traced differences in learning to the identity narratives current in each group.

Underlying this work is the claim that object-oriented, or practical, activity and discursive activity develop by prompting one another. Practical and discursive activities, on Sfard's account, "co-evolved in cycles, functioning like two legs that by a constant attempt to get ahead of the other one keep moving the whole system toward an ever greater complexity". Studies of how children individualize numerical routines have examined this interaction at the level of a single learner.

=== Societal learning and the growth of complexity ===
Sfard presented the framework's account of societal learning (i.e., the capacity of human beings to build each generation's ways of acting on those of the generations before) as its most general contribution, because it managed to answer a question that traditional theories of learning had left unanswered. On the commognitive account, that capacity rests on the co-constitutive interaction between discourses and physical tools, which together function as "practically unbounded compressors, repositories, and disseminators of complexity".

The compression is achieved through objectification, which is "widely practiced across mathematics as a means of compressing the discourse, and thus of making it possible to say more with less": lengthy stretches of text, such as those describing a process, are periodically replaced by a single noun, and the compressed discourse can be objectified again in its turn. Because the operation can be repeated on its own products, and because physical tools are likewise miniaturized and built on existing tools, the complexity a community can carry accumulates without an evident upper bound. Societal learning being, on Sfard's account, "the signature feature of the human species", she proposed that commognition "may be said to have made a tentative contribution to solving the puzzle of human uniqueness".

== Reception ==
=== Reviews of Thinking as Communicating ===
Reviewers of the 2008 book agreed on the scale and internal coherence of what it attempted. Gerry Stahl called it "one of the most impressive unified, homogenous theories of learning" and credited Sfard with carrying the linguistic turn of twentieth-century philosophy into learning science. Jay Lemke considered the argument "very carefully reasoned" and thought of the book as a well-specified practice theory that replaces the mentalist notions of Cartesian dualism with a single account of how mathematical sense is made. Paul Cobb wrote that the numerous constructs Sfard proposed did achieve the operational rigor she sought, and that her work stood apart from related research on discourse in the precision with which it analyzed particular discourses and the process of becoming their participant. For Cobb, its handling of three levels of analysis at once is impressive: historically established mathematical discourse, the local discourse of the classroom, and individual students' developing discourses. He called it "one of the most important current developments in research on thinking and learning". Tony Wing, a practicing mathematics teacher, validated it as an essential reading for its pragmatic originality and distinguished its rehabilitation of imitation, and Mathew Felton and Mitchell Nathan welcomed the prospect of treating central and peripheral questions of mathematics education all within a single framework.

The reservations these reviewers raised fell into three groups. The first was methodological: defining thinking as communication risks a self-fulfilling prophecy, Felton and Nathan argued, since evidence such as kinesthetic and visual imagery, eye movements and reaction times may then be discounted, and Wing asked whether all perceptual functioning really includes discursive responses. The second concerned scope: Stahl objected to the book's thin coverage of neighboring theories, and remarked that its empirical base consisted of brief dyadic and adult–child excerpts, mostly translated from Hebrew. The third concerned what the account appeared to leave out—affect, in Wing's and Lemke's reading, with Lemke suggesting that affect might itself be an internalized form of originally interpersonal processes and so belonged inside the theory; mathematical creation as against the communication of ready-made mathematics, so that a learner inventing new mathematics as Ramanujan had done seemed remote from the argument; and equity, since the circularities Sfard saw as inherent in meta-level learning implied, on Cobb's reading, unavoidable inequities in students' motivation to learn mathematics at school, a conclusion he found disquieting enough to hope that parts of her analysis might require modification.

Several of these reservations were addressed by work published after the reviews appeared. The place of affect and of social factors, raised by Wing and by Lemke, became the subject of the commognitive research on subjectifying and identity that Sfard and Heyd-Metzuyanim developed from 2012 onward, in which the emotional and social dimensions of learning are analyzed with the same discursive tools the framework applies to cognition. The narrowness of the empirical base noted by Stahl has been reduced by studies conducted in a range of languages and educational settings and by applications outside mathematics.

=== Applications ===
Commognitive studies have been carried out from early childhood through university level and in teacher education, and return to a recurring set of questions: how particular mathematical discourses—numerical, algebraic, functional, geometric, probabilistic and proof-related—develop in individual learners and historically; what teaching does, and fails to do, to occasional changes in the meta-rules of a discourse; how routines shift from ritual toward exploratory participation; and how language, culture and identity bear on who takes up a discourse and how. Work in this vein has examined middle-school problem solving, the shift of commognitive responsibility from teacher to student in one-to-one tutoring, the largely implicit meta-rules of university proof lectures, the use of nineteenth-century correspondence to help a student work out what counts as rigor, history-based teacher-education tasks designed to provoke commognitive conflict, a meta-level transition achieved between peers in geometry, and teaching aimed at meta-level learning in a lesson introducing complex numbers. Much of it appeared in a special issue of The Journal of Mathematical Behavior titled "Advances in Commognitive Research", edited by Jason Cooper and Igor' Kontorovich.

Researchers have also extended the framework's vocabulary. Igor' Kontorovich accounted for students' apparently self-contradictory answers to square-root tasks by introducing intra-commognitive conflicts, between incommensurable strands within a single learner's discourse, together with precedent pockets; Irene Biza introduced the discursive footprint, the trace that curricular encounters with a topic across mathematical domains leave in students' later discourse; Talli Nachlieli and Michal Tabach carried deritualization from individual learners to whole classes by way of a classroom-level precedent-search-space; and Jason Cooper and Irit Lavie networked commognition with Vygotskian accounts of the zone of proximal development, proposing interdiscursivity and arguing, against the received commognitive position, that first steps into an incommensurable discourse need not be ritualized.

==== Beyond mathematics education ====
Although developed within mathematics education, the framework has been applied elsewhere in the learning sciences. Shelley Rap and Ron Blonder used it to analyze chemistry learning in social-network groups; Ofek Sivan, David Perl-Nussbaum and Edit Yerushalmi studied physics teachers' professional development on measurement uncertainty; Victoria Wong and colleagues identified patterns in student discourse on quantitative science problems; Desi Rahmatina and Norasykin Mohd Zaid analyzed undergraduates' statistical routines; and Karis Jones applied the notion of commognitive conflict to preservice English teachers encountering poetic discourse online. Olov Viirman and Elena Nardi, following biology students through mathematical modelling tasks, concluded that cross-disciplinary contexts are well suited to commognitive research.

In a commentary on that special issue, Nathalie Sinclair described commognition as "a cumulative, coherent and convincing theory that is also seductive, singular and selective". She counted the close connection between theory and method among its strengths, and read the growth of its vocabulary past thirty terms as a sign of the generativity of its premises, while warning that the resulting complexity could hamper accessibility for newcomers. Her reservations were that commognitive research showed "a certain totalising or territorialising tendency" to describe every phenomenon in exclusively commognitive terms, that its commitment to a single mathematical discourse sat awkwardly with more pluralist views of mathematics, and that the communication analyzed across the issue was almost entirely spoken and written words, with no physical or digital tools in sight. Writing in 2022, fourteen years after the book's publication, she thought commognition was "far from being widely accepted, or for that matter, understood".

=== Adoption ===
A meta-synthesis of thirty-two Scopus-indexed commognitive studies reported that adoption began rising in 2020, that close to two-thirds of the studies were conducted at the higher-education level, that all of them used qualitative methods, and that the largest shares came from Indonesia, New Zealand, Sweden and South Africa. Dzulfikar et al. attributed the growth to the framework's capacity to address cognitive, interactional and affective questions through a single kind of discourse analysis, and identified error analysis and commognitive conflict as subjects that remained little studied.

== Sources ==
- Sfard, Anna (2008). Thinking as Communicating: Human Development, the Growth of Discourses, and Mathematizing. Cambridge: Cambridge University Press. doi:10.1017/CBO9780511499944. ISBN 978-0-521-86737-5.
