= Irena Bauman =

British architect

- Born: 1955 (age 69–70); Warsaw
- Occupation: Architect

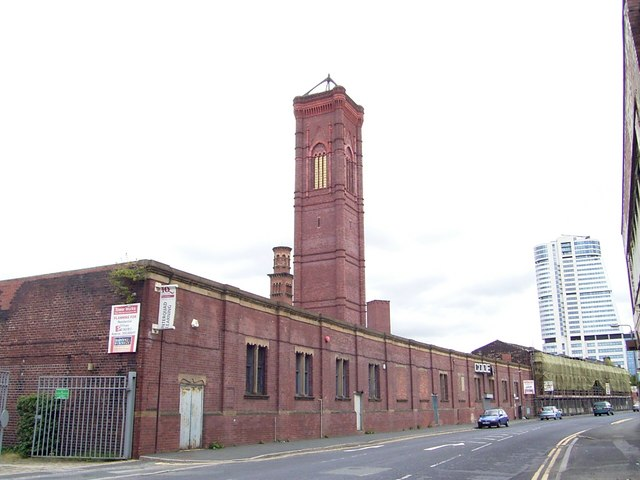
Tower Works in Holbeck

Irena Bauman (born 1955) is an architect and co-founder and director of Bauman Lyons Architects. She co-founded this firm with Maurice Lyons in 1992. Bauman is a professor of Sustainable Urbanism at Sheffield University School of Architecture and is also an external examiner at the Welsh School of Architecture and Manchester School of Architecture. Bauman holds several positions such as Chair of the Regional Design Review Panel, Chair of Yorkshire Design Review, Patron of Urban Design Group, and she is a Fellow of Royal Society of Arts. She was also the Commissioner for Commission for Architecture and the Built Environment for the UK from 2002 to 2009.

== Life and education ==
Irena Bauman was born in Warsaw in 1955. She is the daughter of Zygmunt Bauman, a Polish sociologist and philosopher. Bauman moved from Israel to Leeds in 1972, when she was 15 years old. In 1981, she received a BA in architecture from Liverpool University.

== Career ==
Bauman's work includes Huddersfield Media Centre project and Tower Works in Holbeck, Leeds, West Yorkshire, next to the Leeds and Liverpool Canal; a £48 million pound project to redesign a former factory, notable for its three listed towers. She prefers working locally as part of her practice's aim to "maximise productivity and gain a deeper understanding of place." She has said that her firm will not travel more than 70 miles for work because she likes to get to know the "politics and culture" of the places she works. The firm also largely generates its own work rather than just accepting commissions.

Bauman has said that she "[believes] resilience [following issues such as climate change, unemployment, and violence] to be one of the key issues of the 21st century" and that architects play a role in building up the resilience of the places in which they work. Her firm's goal is to think about social justice and sustainability from an architectural standpoint.

She helped coordinate an international conference titled Architecture and Resilience on Human Scale which was held at the Sheffield School of Architecture in September 2015.

== Awards ==
2000, she won a Royal Institute of British Architects award for her work on the south promenade of Bridlington.

== Writing ==
The focus of her book How to Be a Happy Architect is the value of architecture in society and the ethics behind architecture. Bauman has stated, "As architects we have a choice of how to practice and there are ethical choices we can make both as professionals and as individuals. I want to teach students architecture and urban design that is underpinned by a value system that makes it worthwhile to get out of bed every morning."

She has also written columns for Building Design magazine discussing ethics behind architecture.

Additionally, she compiled case studies for the Royal Institute of British Architects on "retrofitting neighborhoods of the future", titled Retrofitting Neighbourhoods –Designing for Resilience.

== Publications ==
- How to be a Happy Architect Black Dog Publishing (1 July 2008) ISBN 978-1904772781
- Retrofitting Neighbourhoods –Designing for Resilience (potentially still a work in progress)

== Awards ==
- Royal Institute of British Architects award for her work on the south promenade of Bridlington (2000)
