= 2025 in Liechtenstein =

- Decades: 2000s; 2010s; 2020s
- See also: History of Liechtenstein; List of years in Liechtenstein

Events in the year 2025 in Liechtenstein.

== Incumbents ==
- Prince: Hans-Adam II
- Regent: Alois
- Prime Minister: Daniel Risch (until 10 April), Brigitte Haas (from 10 April)

== Events ==
- 1 January – Same-sex marriages comes into effect in Liechtenstein.
- 9 February – 2025 Liechtenstein general election: The Patriotic Union retains its plurality in the Landtag.
- 3 April – Radio Liechtenstein ceases broadcasting following an October 2024 referendum that saw voters approve ending state funding to the station.
- 10 April – Brigitte Haas is inaugurated as Liechtenstein's first female prime minister.
- 16 September – Liechtenstein signs a free trade agreement with the Mercosur bloc.

== Holidays ==
- 1 January – New Year's Day
- 2 January – Saint Berchtold's Day
- 6 January – Epiphany
- 2 February – Candlemas
- 13 February – Shrove Tuesday
- 19 March – Saint Joseph's Day
- 19 April – Good Friday
- 21 April – Easter Monday
- 1 May – International Workers' Day
- 29 May – Ascension Day
- 9 June – Whit Monday
- 19 June – Corpus Christi
- 15 August – Assumption Day/National Day
- 8 September – Nativity of Mary
- 1 November – All Saints' Day
- 8 December – Immaculate Conception
- 24 December – Christmas Eve
- 25 December – Christmas Day
- 26 December – Saint Stephen's Day
- 31 December – New Year's Eve

== Deaths ==
- 6 April – Peter Geiger, 82, historian (b. 1942)
- 16 August – Ewald Eberle, 92, Olympic alpine skier (1956) (b. 1933)
- 8 December – Arthur Konrad, 91, politician (b. 1934)

== See also ==
- 2025 in the European Union
