= 2013 in Liechtenstein =

- Decades: 1990s; 2000s; 2010s; 2020s
- See also: History of Liechtenstein; List of years in Liechtenstein

Events in the year 2013 in Liechtenstein.

== Incumbents ==
- Prince: Hans-Adam II
- Regent: Alois
- Prime Minister: Klaus Tschütscher (until 27 March), Adrian Hasler (since 27 March)

== Events ==
- February 3 – The 2013 Liechtenstein general election take place, resulting with the Patriotic Union (VU) suffering a large defeat, losing more than a third of its seats, while the Progressive Citizens' Party lost one seat in the landtag.
- May 1 - FC Vaduz defeat FC Balzers in penalties after a 1-1 game in the final of the 2012-2013 Liechtenstein Cup.
- July 19 – August 4 – Liechtenstein competed at the 2013 World Aquatics Championships in Barcelona, Spain.

== Deaths ==
- Markus Büchel, 54, Liechtenstein politician, Prime Minister (1993).

== See also ==
- 2013 in Europe
- City states
