= 2016 in Liechtenstein =

- Decades: 1990s; 2000s; 2010s; 2020s
- See also: History of Liechtenstein; List of years in Liechtenstein

Events in the year 2016 in Liechtenstein.

== Incumbents ==
- Prince: Hans-Adam II
- Regent: Alois
- Prime Minister: Adrian Hasler

== Population ==
- Liechtenstein- 37609
- Vaduz- 5400
- Shaan- 6000
- Balzers- 4400
- Eschen- 4400

== Events ==
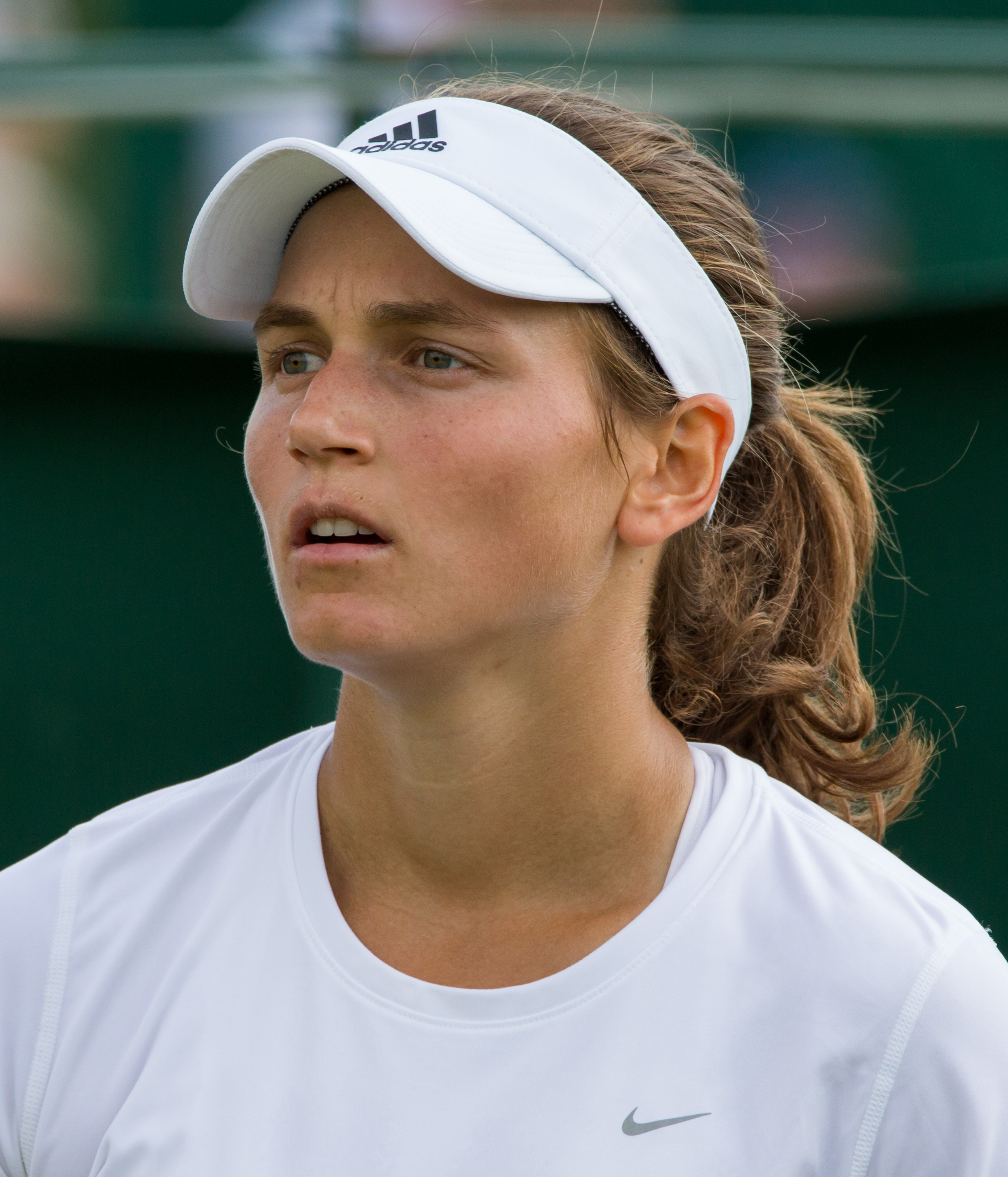
Stephanie Vogt competed in tennis at the 2016 Summer Olympics

- 5–21 August – Liechtenstein at the 2016 Summer Olympics: 3 competitors in 2 sports (swimming and tennis).
- 18 September – A referendum on amendments to the Family Allowances Act was held, with the outcome that the amendments were rejected by 82% of voters.

== Football Events ==
- 23 March – Liechtenstein football team draw 0-0 against Gibraltar.
- 28 March – Liechtenstein football team lost 3-2 at Rheinpark Stadion 3-2 to Faroe Islands in a tight affair. Both goals were scored by Sandro Wolfinger.
- 6 June – Liechtenstein football team lost 4-0 to Iceland as Birkir Sævarsson, Eiður Guðjohnsen, Kolbeinn Sigþórsson and Alfreð Finnbogason score a goal.
- 31 August – Liechtenstein football team lost 5-0 at Nordstrom Arena Horsens 5-0 to Denmark as Andreas Cornelius, Jens Stryger Larsen, Viktor Fischer and Nicolai Jørgensen score goals on Liechtenstein.
- 5 September – Liechtenstein football team lost 8-0 at Reino de Léon 8-0 to Spain with Sergi Roberto, Diego Costa, Álvaro Morata, David Silva and Vitolo score goals on them.
- 6 October – Liechtenstein football team lose 0-2 at Rheinpark Stadion 0-2 against Albania with Peter Jehle scoring an own goal and then Bekim Balaj scored for Albania.

== Deaths ==
- 16 February – Lorenz Hasler (b. 1946)

== See also ==
- 2016 in Europe
- City states
