= Konarski Secondary School in Rzeszów =

High school in Rzeszów, Poland

Konarski Secondary School in Rzeszów Liceum Ogólnokształcące im. księdza Stanisława Konarskiego w Rzeszowie
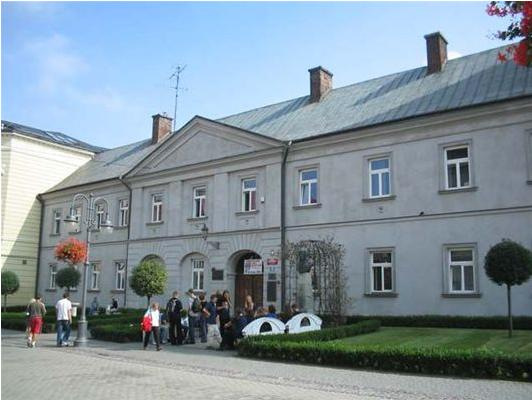

Location
- 3 Maja Street 15; Rzeszów, Poland
- Coordinates: 50.0359°N 22.0013°E

Information
- Former name: Collegium Resoviense (1658-1784); Rzeszów's Ober-Gymnasium (1785-1923)
- Type: Public
- Established: 1658
- Founder: Pope Clement IX
- Headmaster: Piotr Wanat
- Enrollment: 777
- Website: 1lo.rzeszow.pl

The Konarski Secondary School (1. Liceum Ogólnokształcące w Rzeszowie im. Księdza Stanisława Konarskiego) is a coeducational public secondary school in Rzeszów, Poland. Founded in 1658, it is one of the oldest secondary schools in Poland. Located in the old town in a historic building designed by Tylman van Gameren, it plays an important role in the cultural life of Rzeszów and Subcarpathia Province.

== History ==
Construction for the building began in 1644 and was funded by Zofia Prudencjanna Ligęza and her brother-in-law Jerzy Sebastian Lubomirski. The school was founded in 1658 but was not established until 1668 by Pope Clement IX. From 1658 until 1784 the school was named as Collegium Resoviense and was run by the Piarists Order. In the 17th and 18th centuries the school was recognized as an important cultural centre, akin to a "semi-university". In 1785, after the First Partition of Poland Austrian authorities removed the school from Piarist control and changed the name to Rzeszów's Ober-Gymnasium. During World War I and Polish-Soviet War teachers and students took part in fighting for the independence of Poland and in 1923 the school was named for Stanisław Konarski. In 1949 the school was reorganised into a four-year high school and in 1964 it became a coeducational high school. The school is part of the Association of Creative Schools and the Club of the Oldest Schools in Poland.

In 1984, the school was awarded the Commander's Cross of the Order of Polonia Restituta.

== Notable people ==
- Maurycy Allerhand (1868–1942) – lawyer, professor at the University of Lviv's Faculty of Law
- Wilhelm Friedberg (1873–1941) – university paleontology professor at Jagiellonian University, high school science teacher, geologist
- Roman Grodecki (1889–1964) – economist historian, professor at Jagiellonian University, member of Polish Academy of Arts and Sciences
- Jerzy Grotowski (1933–1999) – theatre theorist and director
- Julian Hochfeld (1911–1966) sociologist, economist, lawyer, and sociology professor at University of Warsaw
- Onufry Kopczyński (1736–1817) – educator and grammarian of the Polish language
- Stanisław Kot (1885–1975) – Minister of the Polish government, historian, and politician
- Paweł Kowal (1975– ) – former politician and former member of the European Parliament
- Tadeusz Łopuszański (1874–1955) – high school teacher, Minister of Religious Denominations and Public Education, and education reformer
- Prince Hieronim Lubomirski (1648–1706) – noble, politician, and military commander
- Ignacy Łukasiewicz (1822–1882) – pharmacist, engineer, businessman, inventor of kerosene lamp and the modern street lamp, and founder of the world's first oil refinery
- Józef Herman Osiński (1738–1802) – physicist, chemist, organizer of the first chemical laboratory in Poland, botanist
- Józef Sebastian Pelczar (1842–1924) – bishop
- Lucjan Piela (1943– ) – chemist and professor at University of Warsaw
- Julian Przyboś (1901–1970) – poet, essayist, translator
- Władysław Sikorski (1881–1943) – Prime Minister of the Polish Government in Exile and Commander–in–Chief of the Polish Armed Forces during World War II
- Roman Sitko (1880–1942) – Catholic priest, theologian, and educator
- Rafał Ślusarz (1962– ) – politician and former senator in the Parliament of Poland and Sejm
- Władysław Szafer (1886–1970) – botanist, geologist, and professor at Jagiellonian University]
- Józef Szajna (1922–2008) – set designer, director, playwright, theatre tenorist, painter, and graphic artist
- Jacek Szmatka (1950–2001) – sociologist, professor at Jagiellonian University
