= Postmodernity and Its Discontents =

- Author: Zygmunt Bauman
- Language: English
- Subject: Sociology, philosophy
- Genre: Non-fiction
- Publisher: Polity Press (1997)
- Publication date: February 1997
- Publication place: England
- Media type: Print (hardcover / paperback)
- Pages: 232 pp
- ISBN: 0745617905

Postmodernity and Its Discontents is a book written by Zygmunt Bauman, published in 1997. It is considered a landmark in Bauman's studies on postmodernism.(subscription required)(subscription required) The title references Sigmund Freud's 1930 book Civilization and Its Discontents.

== Overview ==
In his work, Bauman references Sigmund Freud's 1930 book Civilization and Its Discontents in the title, which was concerned with repression.

He posits that a shift had taken place in modern society in the latter half of the 20th century. It had changed from a society of producers into a society of consumers. According to Bauman, this change reversed the "modern" tradeoff espoused by Freud in his Civilization and Its Discontents, that freedom was given up in exchange for security and order. In Bauman's view of the postmodern society, the 'will to happiness' is a sacrificing of security. Security was given up in exchange for more freedom, freedom to purchase and consume with a sense of constant uncertainty. It establishes a new category of "strangers" who are excluded from society. .
