= 2024 in Liechtenstein =

- Decades: 2000s; 2010s; 2020s
- See also: History of Liechtenstein; List of years in Liechtenstein

Events in the year 2024 in Liechtenstein.

== Incumbents ==
- Prince: Hans-Adam II
- Regent: Alois
- Prime Minister: Daniel Risch

== Events ==
- 21 January and 25 February – 2024 Liechtenstein referendums

=== January ===
- 19-30 January – Liechtenstein competes at the 2024 Winter Youth Olympics in Gangwon, South Korea, with alpine skier Noah Gianesini and cross-country skier Janik Brunhart representing the country in two sports; no medals are won.

=== March ===
- 13-14 March – Foreign Minister Dominique Hasler visits Washington, D.C. for bilateral meetings and a dialogue at the Organization of American States.
- 21 March – Liechtenstein and the United States sign a memorandum of understanding on apprenticeships and work-based learning.

=== May ===
- 16 May – A bill legalizing same-sex marriage passes in the Landtag by a 24–1 vote.
- 30 May – Liechtenstein moves to tighten control over hundreds of Russian–linked trusts abandoned after U.S. sanctions; 350 trusts are re-managed, 40 liquidated, 85 remain unresolved.

=== July ===
- 23-29 July – Liechtenstein’s three-person delegation competes in Paris for the 2024 Summer Olympics. Cyclist Romano Püntener competes in men’s cross-country mountain biking, and finishes 28th with a time of 1:34:33.

=== August ===
- 14 August – Foreign Minister Dominique Hasler and US Ambassador Scott Miller sign an agreement establishing a Strategic and Economic Partnership Dialogue between Liechtenstein and the United States.
- 25 August – 2024 Vaduz mayoral by-election: Florian Meier (FBP) is elected mayor unopposed with 95% of the vote; voter turnout is 52.2%.

=== October ===
- 16 October – Liechtenstein contributes CHF 40,000 to the EIF Interim Facility to support trade and development in lesser-developed countries.
- 21 October – Liechtenstein joins the International Monetary Fund as its 191st member.

== Holidays ==
- 1 January - New Year's Day
- 2 January - Saint Berchtold's Day
- 6 January - Epiphany
- 2 February - Candlemas
- 13 February - Shrove Tuesday
- 19 March - Saint Joseph's Day
- 29 March - Good Friday
- 1 April - Easter Monday
- 1 May - International Workers' Day
- 9 May - Ascension Day
- 20 May - Whit Monday
- 30 May - Corpus Christi
- 15 August - Assumption Day/National Day
- 8 September - Nativity of Mary
- 1 November - All Saints' Day
- 8 December – Immaculate Conception
- 24 December – Christmas Eve
- 25 December - Christmas Day
- 26 December – Saint Stephen's Day
- 31 December – New Year's Eve

== Deaths ==
- 22 October – Werner Gstöhl, 87, politician (born 1936)

== See also ==
- 2024 in the European Union
