= Julian Hochfeld =

Polish sociologist (1911–1966)

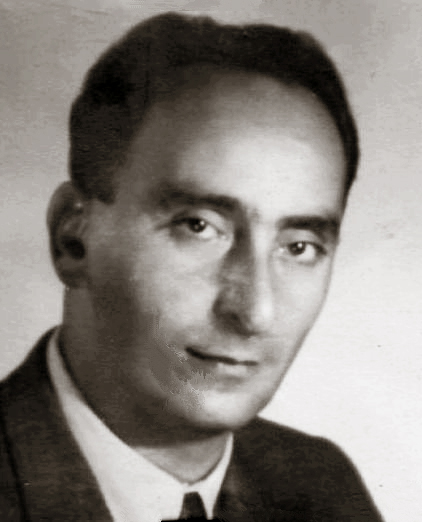
- Born: 16 August 1911; Rzeszów, Kingdom of Galicia and Lodomeria, Austria-Hungary
- Died: 21 July 1966 (aged 54); Paris, District of the Paris Region, French Fifth Republic
- Resting place: Powązki Military Cemetery
- Education: Ober-Gymnasium
- Alma mater: Jagiellonian University
- Political party: PZPR
- Other political affiliations: PPS
- Movement: Socialism
- Board member of: KC PZPR; UNESCO SHS
- Spouse: Anna Aniela née Bohuszewicz
- Parents: Wilhelm (father); Françoise (mother)
- Awards: Order of Polonia Restituta (Commander's Cross); Order of Polonia Restituta (Officer's Cross); Medal of the 10th Anniversary of People's Poland
- Years active: 20th century

Academic work
- Discipline: Political science
- Sub-discipline: Political economy and statistics
- Institutions: University of Warsaw
- Doctoral students: Zygmunt Bauman
- Main interests: Historical materialism
- Notable works: Studia o marksowskiej teorii społeczeństwa
- Military action
- Allegiance: Allied powers
- Branch: Polish Armed Forces in the West
- Engagement: 1939-45
- Unit: 2nd Polish Corps
- Conflict: World War II

Julian Hochfeld (16 August 1911, Rzeszów – 21 July 1966, Paris) was a Polish sociologist. His family originated of German Polish ethnicity, but preferred to stay in new Poland and then assimilated as Polish since the end of World War I. Professor of the University of Warsaw, he is remembered as a major contributor to theories of Polish communism, Marxism and socialism. In his last years he worked for UNESCO. He was a proponent of Open Marxism.
