= Michael Hviid Jacobsen =

Danish professor of sociology (born 1971)

- Born: May 13, 1971 (age 55); Næstved, Denmark
- Citizenship: Denmark
- Education: Holstebro Gymnasium
- Known for: Several book in Danish and English
- Scientific career
- Fields: Sociology
- Institutions: Aalborg University

Michael Hviid Jacobsen (born 13 May 1971 in Næstved, Denmark) is a Danish professor of sociology. Since 1997 he has been employed at Aalborg University, acting from 2009 as a professor at the Department of Sociology and Social Work. He is a frequent lecturer and often appears in the media as an expert within a wide range of topics, particularly in relation to our changing culture of death and criminal issues.

== Education ==
Michael Hviid Jacobsen graduated from Holstebro Gymnasium (upper secondary school) in 1992 with A-levels in social studies and languages and went on to study social science and business administration at Aalborg University. He was awarded a bachelor's degree in 1995, a master's degree in 1998 and a PhD degree in 2004. He has also been employed as an assistant professor and an associate professor of sociology at Aalborg University.

For a number of years, Michel Hviid Jacobsen was Head of Studies for the Sociology programme at Aalborg University. He was also the initiator of the master's degree programme in Criminology in 2011 and in charge of the development of the master's degree programme in Humanistic Palliation.

== Research ==
In his research, Michael Hviid Jacobsen explores a large variety of theoretical and empirical issues such as social theory, the sociology of death, crime, social psychology, emotions, ethics, ethnography and qualitative methods, interaction, metaphors and poetic sociology and utopias.

As a writer, editor and co-editor, he has published more than 60 books in Danish and English (an excerpt of his publication lists is available below), and his book What Use Is Sociology?, written in collaboration with Zygmunt Bauman and Keith Tester in 2013, has now been translated into more than ten languages. Moreover, he has published numerous scientific articles and book chapters.

Michael Hviid Jacobsen has edited a number of scientific journals, including Sociologiske Arbejdspapirer [Sociological Working Papers], Dansk Sociologi [Danish Sociology] and Acta Sociologica and is presently the editor of a number of book series published by Hans Reitzels Publishers and University Press of Southern Denmark.

== Awards ==
Michael Hviid Jacobsen has received a number of awards, e.g. the Health Foundation Youth Research Award in 2007 for his research into death.He was Knighted by the Queen of Denmark in 2023 for his contribution to research.

== Chronological Bibliography of some of Michael Hviid Jacobsen's published books ==
- Jacobsen, Michael Hviid (1997): The Myth of Homo Immortalis – Contours of a Thanatology of Radicalized Modernity. Upubliceret kandidatafhandling.
- Jacobsen, Michael Hviid (2001): The Transformation of Modernity – The Past, Present and Future of an Era (ed. with Mikael Carleheden)
- Jacobsen, Michael Hviid (2002): Liv, fortælling, tekst – strejftog i kvalitativ sociologi (ed. with Søren Kristiansen & Annick Prieur)
- Jacobsen, Michael Hviid (2003): Sociologiske visioner: Sytten bidrag fra en sociologisk brydningstid (editor)
- Jacobsen, Michael Hviid (2004): Zygmunt Bauman – den postmoderne dialektik
- Jacobsen, Michael Hviid (2005): Hverdagslivet – sociologier om det upåagtede (ed. with Søren Kristiansen)
- Jacobsen, Michael Hviid (2006): Baumans mosaik – essays af Zygmunt Bauman om etik, kritik og utopi, 1990-2005 (editor)
- Jacobsen, Michael Hviid (2007): Bauman Beyond Postmodernity: Critical Appraisals, Conversations and Annotated Bibliography 1989-2005 (with Sophia Marshman & Keith Tester)
- Jacobsen, Michael Hviid (2008): Public Sociology – Proceedings of the Anniversary Conference Celebrating Ten Years of Sociology in Aalborg (editor)
- Jacobsen, Michael Hviid (2009): Zygmunt Bauman: Fagre nye læringsliv – læring, pædagogik, uddannelse og ungdom i den flydende modernitet (editor)
- Jacobsen, Michael Hviid (2010): The Contemporary Goffman (editor)
- Jacobsen, Michael Hviid (2011): Humanistisk palliation – teori, metode, etik og praksis (ed. with Karen Marie Dalgaard)
- Jacobsen, Michael Hviid (2012): Utopia and Social Theory (ed. with Keith Tester)
- Jacobsen, Michael Hviid (2013): What Use Is Sociology? (with Zygmunt Bauman & Keith Tester)
- Jacobsen, Michael Hviid (2014): The Social Thought of Erving Goffman (with Søren Kristiansen)
- Jacobsen, Michael Hviid (2015): SociologiNU (with Rasmus Antoft, Rune Valentin Gregersen, Claus D. Hansen, Anja Jørgensen, Trond Beldo Klausen, Lisbeth B. Knudsen, Søren Kristiansen, Anders Petersen & Sune Qvotrup Jensen)
- Jacobsen, Michael Hviid (2016): Liquid Criminology: Doing Imaginative Criminological Research (ed. with Sandra Walklate)
- Jacobsen, Michael Hviid (2017): The Interactionist Imagination (editor)
