= 2017 in Liechtenstein =

- Decades: 1990s; 2000s; 2010s; 2020s
- See also: History of Liechtenstein; List of years in Liechtenstein

Events in the year 2017 in Liechtenstein.

== Incumbents ==
- Prince: Hans-Adam II
- Regent: Alois
- Prime Minister: Adrian Hasler

== Events ==
- 5 February – Liechtenstein general election, 2017.

=== Sport ===
- The 2016–17 Liechtenstein Cup is the 72nd season of Liechtenstein's annual cup competition. The first round, second round, and quarterfinals took place in 2016. The semifinals are held on 5 and 11 April 2017, and the final on 24 May. The cup winner qualifies to the first qualifying round of the 2017–18 UEFA Europa League. In the final, on 24 May 2017, FC Vaduz won 5:1 over USV Eschen/Mauren.

== Deaths ==
- 3 October – Manfred Biedermann (b. 1952)

== See also ==
- 2017 in Europe
- City states
