= 2027 Liechtenstein local elections =

- 14 March 2027

Local elections are set to be held in Liechtenstein on 14 March 2027 to elect the municipal councils and the mayors of the eleven municipalities.

== Mayoral elections ==
=== Declared candidates ===
Municipality	Party	Candidate	Date announced
Balzers	Patriotic Union	Karl Malin	15 May 2026
Balzers	Progressive Citizens' Party	Christine Wohlwend	27 April 2026
Eschen	Progressive Citizens' Party	Tino Quaderer	1 June 2026
Gamprin	Progressive Citizens' Party	Johannes Hasler	11 May 2026
Mauren	Patriotic Union	Peter Frick	30 June 2026
Mauren	Progressive Citizens' Party	Reto Kieber	9 March 2026
Planken	Progressive Citizens' Party	Sascha Quaderer	1 February 2026
Ruggell	Progressive Citizens' Party	Christian Öhri	2 March 2026
Schaan	Patriotic Union	Christoph Lingg	17 March 2026
Schaan	Progressive Citizens' Party	Markus Beck	21 April 2026
Schellenberg	Patriotic Union	Dietmar Hasler	28 June 2026
Schellenberg	Progressive Citizens' Party	Johannes Kaiser	23 March 2026
Triesen	Patriotic Union	Fabian Wolfinger	13 May 2026
Triesen	Progressive Citizens' Party	Clarissa Frommelt	4 May 2026
Triesenberg	Patriotic Union	Christoph Beck	10 February 2026
Vaduz	Progressive Citizens' Party	Florian Meier	20 April 2026
