= Liquid Love (book) =

2003 book by Zygmunt Bauman

- First edition
- Author: Zygmunt Bauman
- Subject: Human relations in post-modern world
- Published: 21 April 2003
- Publisher: Polity
- Pages: 162
- ISBN: 9780745624891

Liquid Love: On the Frailty of Human Bonds is a 2003 book by Zygmunt Bauman which discusses human relations in liquid modernity (late modernity). The book is part of series of books written by Bauman, which also include Liquid Modernity, Liquid Life, and Liquid Times.

== Chapters ==
The book is divided into four chapters as below:

1. Falling In and Out of Love
2. In and Out of the Toolbox of Sociality
3. On the Difficulty of Loving Thy Neighbour
4. Togetherness Dismantled

== Reviews ==
According to Alek Tarkowski, each of the book's four parts is relatively autonomous, "each of them a flock of thoughts that not only lacks a straightforward argument, but even makes it difficult for the reader to draw all the lines of thought together." However, the review ends with acknowledgement that the book emphasizes "a search for the politics of shared and common humanity" as the most important contemporary challenge. "Such politics depend upon a global, imagined solidarity and understanding—in other words, upon love," Tarkowski concludes.
