= Janina Bauman =

Polish journalist and writer

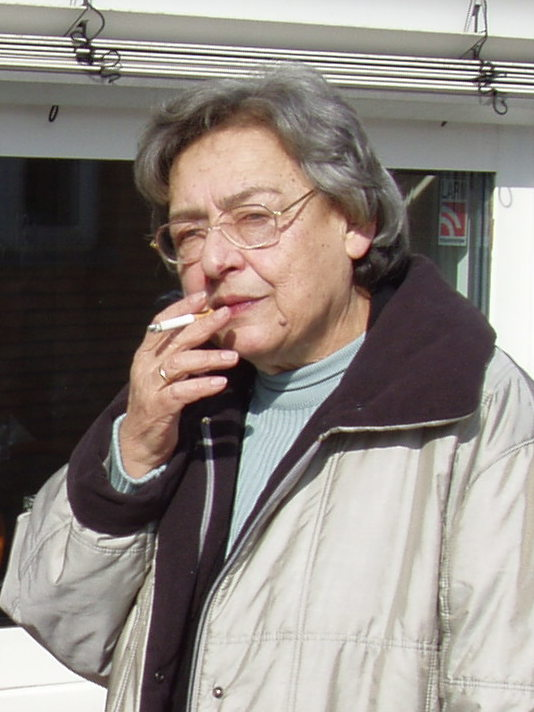
- Bauman in 2006
- Born: Janina Lewinson; 1926; Warsaw, Poland
- Died: 2009 (aged 82–83); Leeds, United Kingdom
- Citizenship: United Kingdom
- Occupation: Writer
- Spouse: Zygmunt Bauman
- Writing career
- Period: 1986–2009
- Genres: Mémoir, biography, history
- Subjects: Poland, World War II, Holocaust

Janina Bauman (née Lewinson; 18 August 1926, in Warsaw – 29 December 2009, in Leeds) was a Polish journalist and writer of Jewish origin.

== Biography ==
She was the daughter of Szymon Lewinson (1896–1940), a urologist and Polish Army officer murdered in the Katyn massacre, and of Alina, née Fryszman (1900–1980). She had one sister, Zofia (1930–1971). On her mother's side she was the granddaughter of the physician Aleksander Fryszman (1874–1939) and the niece of Jerzy Fryszman (1904–1976) and of Leon Płockier (1895–1965).

During World War II she was a prisoner in the Warsaw Ghetto with her mother and sister. They managed to escape and were sheltered by a peasant family in the countryside. After the war she studied journalism at the Warsaw Academy of Political and Social Science, where she met her future husband, Zygmunt Bauman. She subsequently worked in the film industry as a translator, researcher and script editor. She left Poland with her husband in 1968 after the antisemitic purges, that followed the March 1968 events. They initially went to Israel, however, after three years they decided to settle permanently in Leeds, England, where she lived until the end of her life.

In 2010 the Bauman Family established the Janina Bauman Prize to be awarded for a winning essay submitted to the Bauman Institute at the University of Leeds.

== Books ==
In Polish

- Bauman, Janina (1995). Powroty. Opowieść w czterech odsłonach. Poznań: Wydawnictwo Zysk i S-ka. p. 111. ISBN 83-7150-058-0.
- Bauman, Janina (2000). Nigdzie na ziemi. Warsaw: Wydawnictwo Żydowskiego Instytutu Historycznego. p. 258. ISBN 83-85888-32-2.
- Bauman, Janina (2009). Zima o poranku. Opowieść dziewczynki z warszawskiego getta. Kraków: Znak. p. 312. ISBN 978-83-240-1126-1.

In English

- Winter in the Morning (1986), based on diaries she kept as a young girl during the war
- A Dream of Belonging (1988). Both were republished in one volume as:
- Beyond These Walls (2009) all with Virago Press

== About Janina Bauman ==
- Janina Bauman, Als Mädchen im Warschauer Ghetto. Ein Überlebensbericht. Aus dem Englischen von Reinhard Wagner. Mit einem Nachwort von Władysław Bartoszewski. Verlag Max Hueber, Ismaning bei München 1986. ISBN 3-19-005510-6
- Peter Wagner : Between two wars: Janina and Zygmunt Bauman's analyses of the contemporary human condition , 2003

== See also ==
- Eva Hoffman
