= 2023 Liechtenstein constitutional referendum =

- 29 January 2023
- Do you want to accept the initiators' draft of the amendment to the constitution of 5 October 1921 (casino ban)?
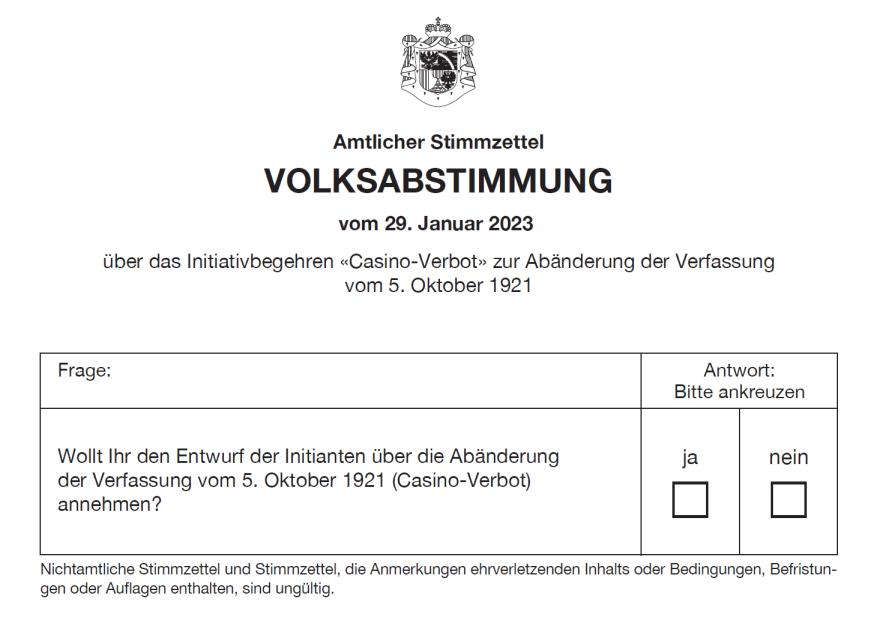
- Referendum ballot with question

Results
Choice	Votes	%
Yes	3,779	26.68%
No	10,383	73.32%
Valid votes	14,162	99.25%
Invalid or blank votes	107	0.75%
Total votes	14,269	100.00%
Registered voters/turnout	20,720	68.87%
- No 60–70% 70–80% 80–90%

A constitutional referendum was held in Liechtenstein on 29 January 2023. Voters voted on a proposal to ban casinos, with 73% voting against the proposal. If a ban had been approved, casinos in Liechtenstein would have been closed and banned by 2028.

== Background ==
Gambling was prohibited in Liechtenstein until 2010, when it was legalised. As of 2023, there are six casinos in the country, which doubled from three in 2019. The national casino association has conceded that it "sees no economic basis for so many casinos in the future". The industry generated CHF 28 million in gambling levies in 2022, which amounted to 3% of tax revenue in the year.

== Petition ==
The group IG VolksMeinung collected more than 2,000 signatures in favour of a ban, from the population of 38,000. The Landtag of Liechtenstein voted against the ban, so it therefore had to be decided by referendum.

== Results ==
Choice	Votes	%
For	3,779	26.68
Against	10,383	73.32
Total	14,162	100.00
Valid votes	14,162	99.25
Invalid votes	88	0.62
Blank votes	19	0.13
Total votes	14,269	100.00
Registered voters/turnout	20,720	68.87
Source: Abstimmungen
