= Zygmunt Bauman =

Polish sociologist and philosopher (1925–2017)

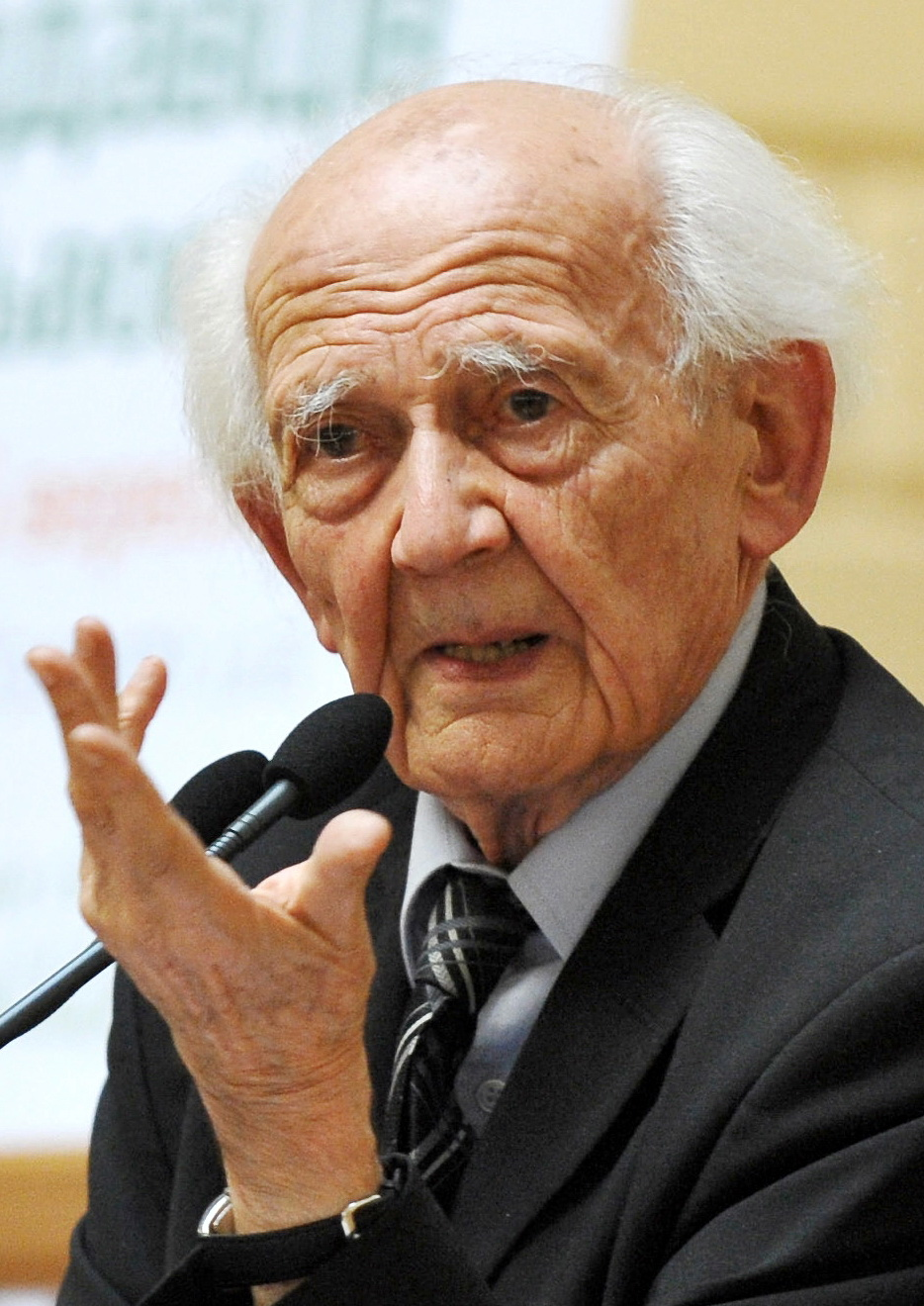
- Bauman in 2013
- Born: 19 November 1925; Poznań, Second Polish Republic
- Died: 9 January 2017 (aged 91); Leeds, West Yorkshire, England

Education
- Education: University of Warsaw; London School of Economics
- Thesis: Doktryna polityczna brytyjskiej Partii Pracy [The Political Doctrine of the British Labour Party] (1956)
- Doctoral advisor: Julian Hochfeld

Philosophical work
- School: Continental philosophy Western Marxism (early)
- Main interests: Ethics · Political philosophy · Sociology · Postmodernity · Postmodern art
- Notable ideas: Modernity's struggle with ambiguity, resulting in the Holocaust · postmodern ethics · critique of liquid modernity · liquid fear · allosemitism · retrotopia

Zygmunt Bauman (/ˈbaʊmən/; Polish: [ˈbauman]; 19 November 1925 – 9 January 2017) was a Polish–British sociologist and philosopher.

During the 1968 Polish political crisis he was driven out of the Polish People's Republic, was forced to give up his Polish citizenship, and emigrated to Israel.

In 1971 he moved to the United Kingdom, where he studied at the London School of Economics and became a professor of sociology at the University of Leeds.

Bauman was a social theorist, writing on matters as diverse as modernity and the Holocaust, consumerism in postmodernity, and liquid modernity.

== Early life and education ==
Bauman was born to a non-observant Polish Jewish family in Poznań, Second Polish Republic, in 1925. In 1939, when Poland was invaded by Nazi Germany and the Soviet Union, his family escaped eastwards into the USSR. During World War II, Bauman enlisted in the Soviet-controlled First Polish Army, working as a political instructor. He took part in the Battle of Kolberg (1945) and the Battle of Berlin. In May 1945, he was awarded the Military Cross of Valour. After World War II he became one of the Polish Army's youngest majors.

== Career ==
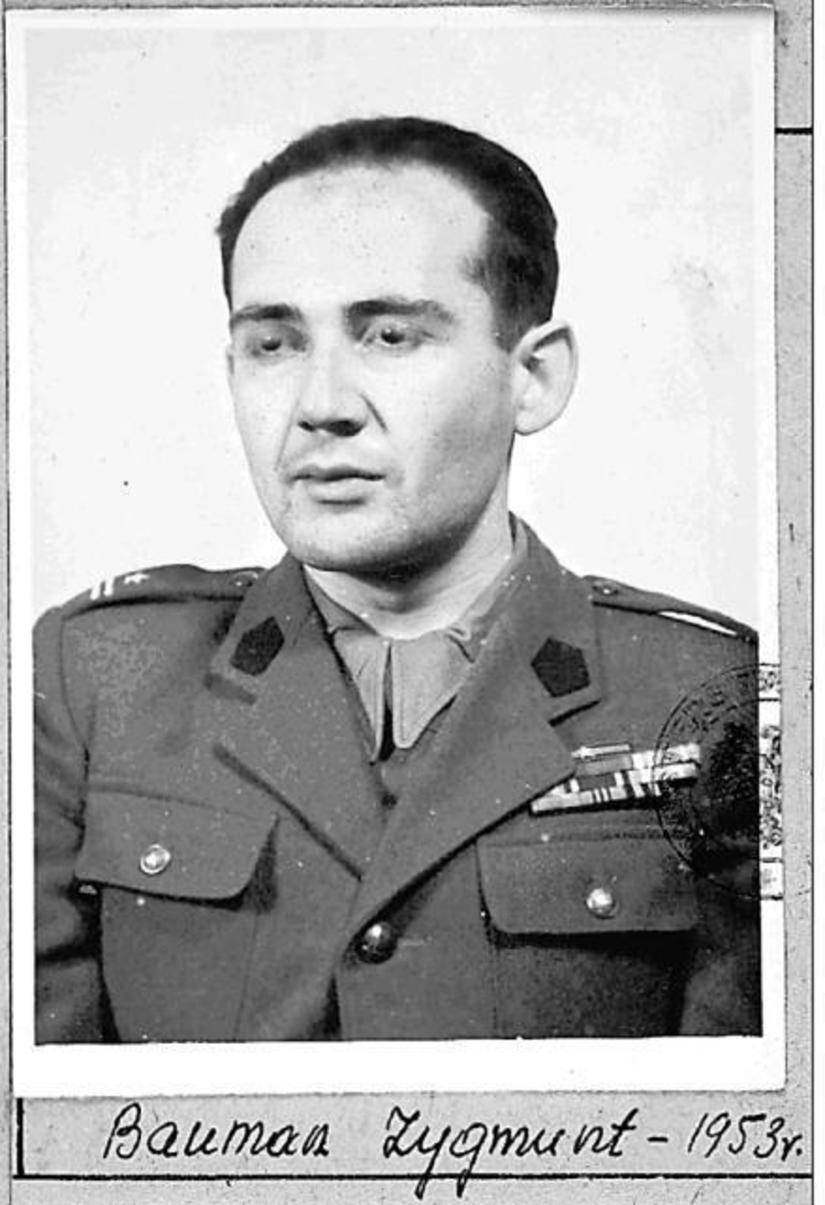
Bauman in 1953, as a major in the Polish Internal Security Corps

According to the Polish Institute of National Remembrance, from 1945 to 1953 Bauman was a political officer in the Internal Security Corps (KBW), a military intelligence unit formed to combat the Ukrainian Insurgent Army and the remnants of the Polish Home Army; however, the nature and extent of his involvement remain unknown, as well as the exact circumstances under which it was terminated. In an interview with The Guardian, Bauman confirmed he had been a committed Communist during and after World War II and had never made a secret of it. He admitted that joining the military intelligence service at age 19 was a mistake although he had a "dull" desk job and did not remember informing on anyone.

While serving in the Internal Security Corps, Bauman first studied sociology at the Warsaw Academy of Political and Social Science. In 1953, Bauman, already in the rank of major, was suddenly dishonourably discharged, after his father had approached the Israeli embassy in Warsaw with a view to emigrating to Israel. As Bauman did not share his father's Zionist tendencies and was indeed strongly anti-Zionist, his dismissal caused a severe, though temporary estrangement from his father. During the period of unemployment that followed, he completed his M.A. and in 1954 became a lecturer at the University of Warsaw, where he remained until 1968. He prepared his PhD dissertation on the political doctrine of the Labour Party under the supervision of Julian Hochfeld, and defended it at the University of Warsaw in 1956.

While at the London School of Economics, where his supervisor was Robert McKenzie, he prepared a comprehensive study on the British socialist movement, his first major book. Published originally in Polish in 1959, a revised edition appeared in English in 1972. Bauman went on to publish other books, including Socjologia na co dzień ("Everyday Sociology", 1964), which reached a large popular audience in Poland and later formed the foundation for the English-language text-book Thinking Sociologically (1990). Initially, Bauman remained close to orthodox Marxist doctrine; influenced by Georg Simmel and Antonio Gramsci, he became increasingly critical of Poland's Communist government. Owing to this, he was never awarded a professorship even after he completed his habilitation. After his former teacher, Julian Hochfeld, was made vice-director of UNESCO's Department for Social Sciences in Paris in 1962, Bauman inherited Hochfeld's chair.

Faced with increasing political pressure connected with a political purge led by Mieczysław Moczar, the Chief of the Polish Communist Security Police, Bauman renounced his membership of the governing Polish United Workers' Party in January 1968. The 1968 Polish political crisis culminated in a purge that drove many remaining Communist Poles of Jewish descent out of the country, including those intellectuals who had fallen from grace with the Communist government. Bauman, who had lost his chair at the University of Warsaw on 25 March, was among them. He had to give up Polish citizenship to be allowed to leave the country. In 1968, he went to Israel to teach at Tel Aviv University. In 1970, he moved to Great Britain, where he accepted the chair of sociology at the University of Leeds. There he intermittently also served as head of the department. After his appointment, he published almost exclusively in English, his third language, and his reputation grew. From the late 1990s, Bauman exerted a considerable influence on the anti- or alter-globalisation movement.

In a 2011 interview in the Polish weekly Polityka, Bauman criticised Zionism and Israel, saying Israel was not interested in peace and that it was "taking advantage of the Holocaust to legitimize unconscionable acts". He expressed that "the mission of the Holocaust survivors is to bring salvation to the world and to protect it from another catastrophe: to expose hidden but still vital evil tendencies in this world, in order to prevent a second disgrace to civilization." In this specific context, he compared the Israeli West Bank barrier to the walls of the Warsaw Ghetto, where thousands of Jews died in the Holocaust, but to emphasize that "inflicting suffering degrades and morally destroys those who inflict suffering – and, contrary to belief, does not ennoble the suffering in the least." The Israeli ambassador to Poland, Zvi Bar, called Bauman's comments "half truths" and "groundless generalizations". Janina Bauman, the wife of Bauman, along with her sister Sophie and her mother Alina survived the slaughter of the Jews of Warsaw and the crushing of the Warsaw ghetto.

In 2013, Bauman made his first visit to Israel since leaving the country 1970: he accepted an invitation offered by the Israeli Sociological Society to give a keynote lecture at the ISS Annual Meeting and conduct a seminar with doctoral sociology students. Bauman was a supporter of the Campaign for the Establishment of a United Nations Parliamentary Assembly, an organisation which advocates for democratic reform in the United Nations, and the creation of a more accountable international political system.

== Personal life and death ==
Bauman was married to writer Janina Bauman (née Lewinson; 18 August 1926 – 29 December 2009). They had three daughters, painter Lydia Bauman, architect Irena Bauman, and professor Anna Sfard, a leading theorist of education at the University of Haifa. His grandson Michael Sfard is a prominent civil rights activist and author in Israel. After losing his first wife, he married sociologist Aleksandra Jasińska-Kania in 2015. She survived him upon his death in 2017. Bauman died in Leeds on 9 January 2017.

== Work ==
Bauman's published work extends to 57 books and well over a hundred articles. Most of these address a number of common themes, among which are globalisation, modernity and postmodernity, consumerism, and morality.

=== Early work ===
Bauman's earliest publication in English is a study of the British labour movement and its relationship to class and social stratification, originally published in Poland in 1960. He continued to publish on the subject of class and social conflict until the early 1980s. His last book was on the subject of Memories of Class. Whilst his later books do not address issues of class directly, he continued to describe himself as a socialist, and he never rejected Marxism entirely. The neo-Marxist theorist Antonio Gramsci in particular remained one of his most profound influences, along with neo-Kantian sociologist and philosopher Georg Simmel.

=== Modernity and rationality ===
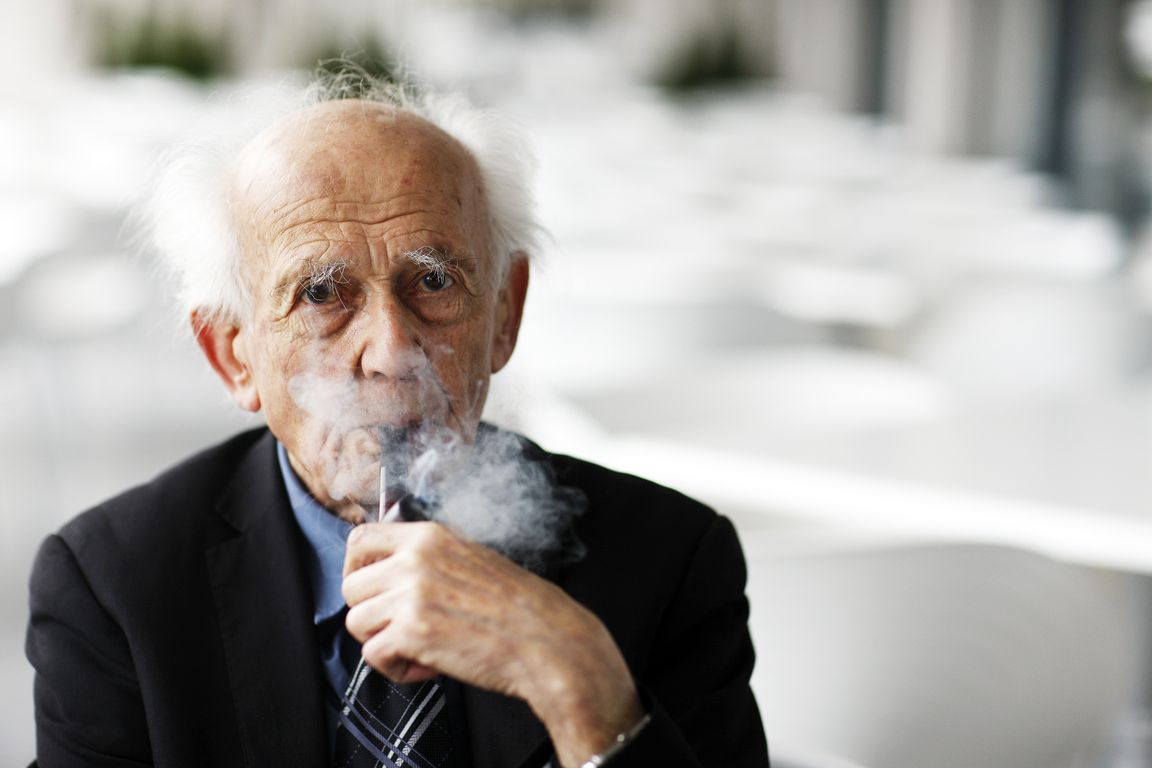
Bauman in Wrocław, 2011

In the late 1980s and early 1990s Bauman published a number of books that dealt with the relationship between modernity, bureaucracy, rationality and social exclusion. Bauman, following Sigmund Freud, came to view European modernity as a trade off: European society, he argued, had agreed to forego a level of freedom to receive the benefits of increased individual security. Bauman argued that modernity, in what he later came to term its 'solid' form, involved removing unknowns and uncertainties. It involved control over nature, hierarchical bureaucracy, rules and regulations, control and categorisation — all of which attempted to gradually remove personal insecurities, making the chaotic aspects of human life appear well-ordered and familiar. Later in a number of books Bauman began to develop the position that such order-making never manages to achieve the desired results.

When life becomes organised into familiar and manageable categories, he argued, there are always social groups who cannot be administered, who cannot be separated out and controlled. In his book Modernity and Ambivalence Bauman began to theorise about such indeterminate persons in terms of an allegorical figure he called, 'the stranger.' Drawing upon Georg Simmel's sociology and the philosophy of Jacques Derrida, Bauman came to write of the stranger as the person who is present yet unfamiliar, society's undecidable. In Modernity and Ambivalence Bauman attempted to give an account of the different approaches modern society adopts toward the stranger. He argued that, on the one hand, in a consumer-oriented economy the strange and the unfamiliar is always enticing; in different styles of food, different fashions and in tourism it is possible to experience the allure of what is unfamiliar. Yet this strange-ness also has a more negative side. The stranger, because he cannot be controlled or ordered, is always the object of fear; he is the potential mugger, the person outside of society's borders who is a constant threat.

One of Bauman's most famous books, Modernity and the Holocaust argues that the Holocaust was fundamentally enabled by the features of modernity itself—bureaucratic rationality, instrumental reason, and the social production of moral indifference. Drawing upon Hannah Arendt's books on totalitarianism and the Enlightenment, Bauman developed the argument that the Holocaust should not simply be considered to be an event in Jewish history, nor a regression to pre-modern barbarism. Rather, he argued, the Holocaust should be seen as deeply connected to modernity and its order-making efforts. Procedural rationality, the division of labour into smaller and smaller tasks, the taxonomic categorisation of different species, and the tendency to view obedience to rules as morally good, all played their role in the Holocaust coming to pass. He argued that for this reason modern societies have not fully grasped the lessons of the Holocaust; it tends to be viewed—to use Bauman's metaphor—like a picture hanging on the wall, offering few lessons. In Bauman's analysis the Jews became 'strangers' par excellence in Europe.

The Final Solution was pictured by him as an extreme example of the attempt made by society to excise the uncomfortable and indeterminate elements that exist within it. Bauman, like the philosopher Giorgio Agamben, contended that the same processes of exclusion that were at work in the Holocaust could, and to an extent do, still come into play today.

=== Postmodernity and consumerism ===
In the mid-to-late 1990s, Bauman began to explore postmodernity and consumerism. He posited that a shift had taken place in modern society in the latter half of the 20th century. It had changed from a society of producers into a society of consumers. According to Bauman, this change reversed Freud's "modern" tradeoff—i.e., security was given up in exchange for more freedom, freedom to purchase, consume, and enjoy life. In his books in the 1990s Bauman wrote of this as being a shift from "modernity" to "post-modernity". Since the turn of the millennium, his books have tried to avoid the confusion surrounding the term "postmodernity" by using the metaphors of "liquid" and "solid" modernity. In his books on modern consumerism, Bauman still writes of the same uncertainties that he portrayed in his writings on "solid" modernity; but in these books he writes of fears becoming more diffuse and harder to pin down. Indeed, they are, to use the title of one of his books, "liquid fears" – fears about paedophilia, for instance, which are amorphous and have no easily identifiable reference. Bauman is credited with coining the term "allosemitism" to encompass both philo-Semitic and anti-Semitic attitudes towards Jews as the other. Bauman reportedly predicted the negative political effect that social media have on voter's choice by denouncing them as 'trap' where people only "see reflections of their own face".

=== Art: a liquid element? ===
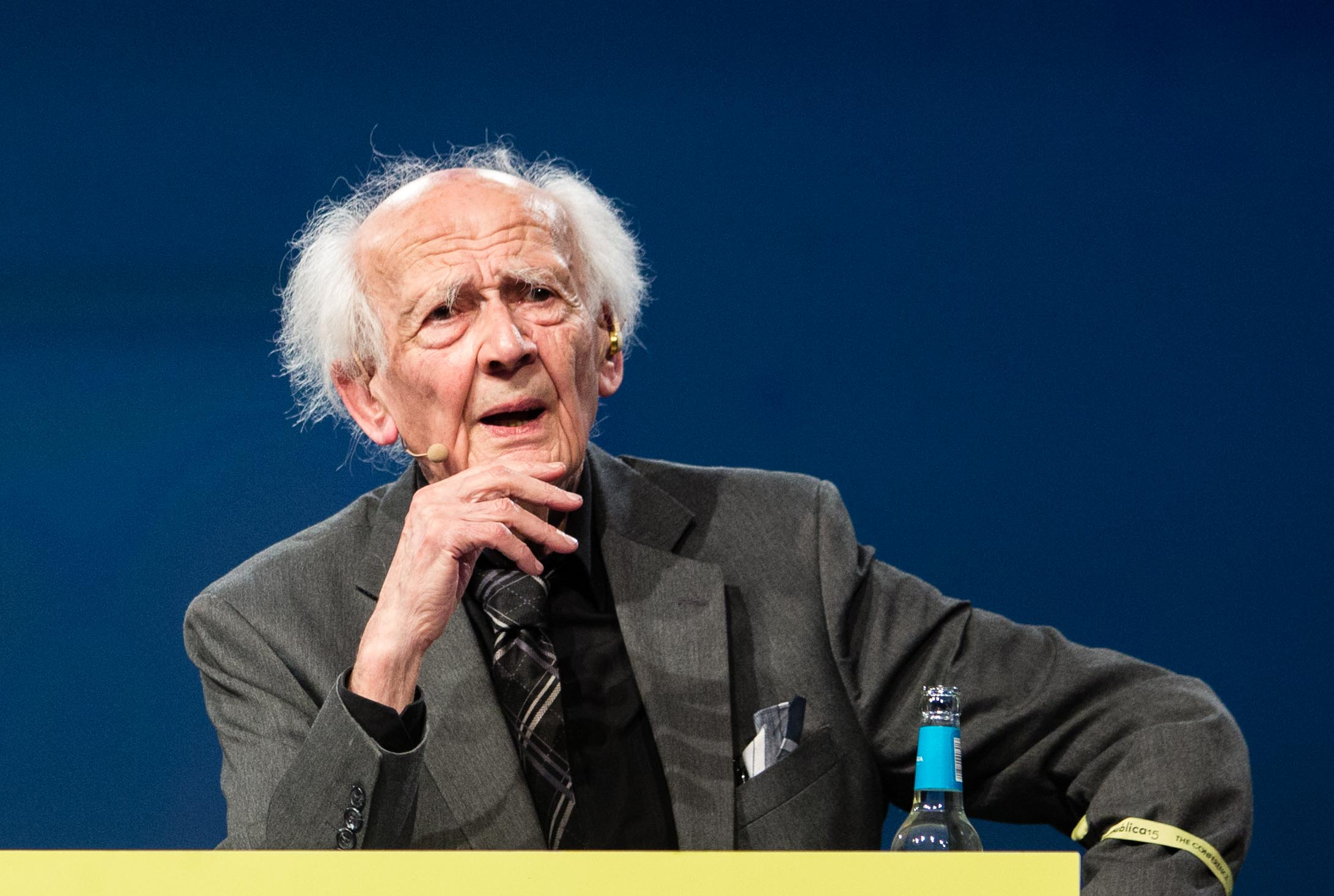
Bauman in Berlin, 2015

One of Bauman works focuses on the concept of art as influenced by the liquidity of appreciation. The author puts forward the idea that "we desire and seek a realization that usually consists of a constant becoming, in a permanent disposition of becoming". In essence, our aim is not the object of our longing but the action of longing itself, and the worst peril is reaching complete satisfaction. In this framework, Bauman explores how art can position itself in a world where the fleeting is the dominant paradigm. Art is substantially something that contributes to giving immortality to virtually anything: hence the philosopher wonders, "can art transform the ephemeral into an eternal matter?"

Bauman concludes that the current reality is characterized by individuals who do not have time nor space to relate with the everlasting, with absolute and established values. Art and the relation of people with them, both in creating it and in participating in it, is dramatically changing. Withal, the concept of culture and art can only find a sense in the liquid society if it abandons its traditional understanding and adopts the deconstructive approach. Bauman gives as examples artworks by Manolo Valdés, Jacques Villeglé, and Herman Braun-Vega. Citing Hannah Arendt, he asserts that "an object is cultural if it persists; its temporary aspect, its permanence, is opposite to the functional ... culture sees itself threatened when all the objects in the world, those produced today and those of the past, are exclusively considered from the point of view of utility for the social process of survival."

== Awards and honours ==
Bauman was awarded the European Amalfi Prize for Sociology and Social Sciences in 1992, the Theodor W. Adorno Award of the city of Frankfurt in 1998 and The VIZE 97 Prize in 2006. He was awarded in 2010, jointly with Alain Touraine, the Princess of Asturias Award for Communication and the Humanities. The University of Leeds established 'The Bauman Institute' within its School of Sociology and Social Policy in his honour in September 2010. The University of Lower Silesia, a small private higher education institution in Lower Silesia, Poland, planned to award Bauman an honorary doctorate in October 2013. As a response to a "several antisemitic attacks via social media internet sites", mixed with accusations of having a pro-socialist background against him by far-right groups, he eventually declined the doctorate. In 2015, the University of Salento awarded Bauman an honorary degree in Modern Languages, Literature and Literary Translation.

== Dismissal of plagiarism allegations ==
In 2014, Peter Walsh, a PhD candidate at the University of Cambridge, accused Bauman of plagiarism from several websites, including Wikipedia, in his book Does the Richness of the Few Benefit Us All? (2013). In this book Bauman is said to have copied verbatim paragraphs from Wikipedia articles on Slow Food and steady-state economy, along with their bibliography, without attributing sources, authors or the fact that they were copied from Wikipedia. While he used a paragraph from the article on the golden handshake, this citation was properly attributed to Wikipedia.

In a response, Bauman suggested that "obedience" to "technical" rules was unnecessary, and that he "never once failed to acknowledge the authorship of the ideas or concepts that I deployed, or that inspired the ones I coined". In a detailed critique of Walsh and co-author David Lehmann, cultural critics Brad Evans and Henry Giroux concluded: "This charge against Bauman is truly despicable. It's a reactionary ideological critique dressed up as the celebration of method and a back-door defence of sterile empiricism and culture of positivism. This is a discourse that enshrines data, correlations, and performance, while eschewing matters of substance, social problems, and power."

== Bibliography ==
=== Warsaw period ===
- 1957: Zagadnienia centralizmu demokratycznego w pracach Lenina [Questions of Democratic Centralism in Lenin's Works]. Warszawa: Książka i Wiedza.
- 1959: Socjalizm brytyjski: Źródła, filozofia, doktryna polityczna [British Socialism: Sources, Philosophy, Political Doctrine]. Warszawa: Państwowe Wydawnictwo Naukowe.
- 1960: Klasa, ruch, elita: Studium socjologiczne dziejów angielskiego ruchu robotniczego [Class, Movement, Elite: A Sociological Study on the History of the British Labour Movement]. Warszawa: Państwowe Wydawnictwo Naukowe.
- 1960: Z dziejów demokratycznego ideału [From the History of the Democratic Ideal]. Warszawa: Iskry.
- 1960: Kariera: cztery szkice socjologiczne [Career: Four Sociological Sketches]. Warszawa: Iskry.
- 1961: Z zagadnień współczesnej socjologii amerykańskiej [Questions of Modern American Sociology]. Warszawa: Książka i Wiedza.
- 1962 (with Szymon Chodak, Juliusz Strojnowski, Jakub Banaszkiewicz): Systemy partyjne współczesnego kapitalizmu [The Party Systems of Modern Capitalism]. Warsaw: Książka i Wiedza.
- 1962: Spoleczeństwo, w ktorym żyjemy [The Society we inhabit]. Warsaw: Książka i Wiedza.
- 1962: Zarys socjologii. Zagadnienia i pojęcia [Outline of Sociology. Questions and Concepts]. Warszawa: Państwowe Wydawnictwo Naukowe.
- 1963: Idee, ideały, ideologie [Ideas, Ideals, Ideologies]. Warszawa: Iskry.
- 1964: Zarys marksistowskiej teorii spoleczeństwa [ An Outline of the Marxist Theory of Society]. Warszawa: Państwowe Wydawnictwo Naukowe.
- 1964: Socjologia na co dzień [Everyday Sociology]. Warszawa: Iskry.
- 1965: Wizje ludzkiego świata. Studia nad społeczną genezą i funkcją socjologii [Visions of a Human World: Studies on the genesis of society and the function of sociology]. Warszawa: Książka i Wiedza.
- 1966: Kultura i społeczeństwo. Preliminaria [Culture and Society, Preliminaries]. Warszawa: Państwowe Wydawnictwo Naukowe.
- 2017: Szkice z teorii kultury [Essays in cultural theory]. Warszawa: Wydawnictwo Naukowe Scholar. ISBN 978-83-7383-878-9 [First edition of a manuscript originally completed in 1967]

=== Leeds period ===
- 1972: Between Class and Elite. The Evolution of the British Labour Movement. A Sociological Study. Manchester: Manchester University Press ISBN 0-7190-0502-7 (Polish original 1960)
- 1973: Culture as Praxis. London: Routledge & Kegan Paul. ISBN 0-7619-5989-0
- 1976: Socialism: The Active Utopia. New York: Holmes and Meier Publishers. ISBN 0-8419-0240-2
- 1976: Towards a Critical Sociology: An Essay on Common-Sense and Emancipation. London: Routledge & Kegan Paul. ISBN 0-7100-8306-8
- 1978: Hermeneutics and Social Science: Approaches to Understanding. London: Hutchinson. ISBN 0-09-132531-5
- 1982: Memories of Class: The Pre-History and After-Life of Class. London/Boston: Routledge & Kegan Paul. ISBN 0-7100-9196-6
- c. 1985 Stalin and the Peasant Revolution: A Case Study in the Dialectics of Master and Slave. Leeds: University of Leeds Department of Sociology. ISBN 0-907427-18-9
- 1987: Legislators and Interpreters: On Modernity, Post-Modernity, Intellectuals. Ithaca, NY: Cornell University Press. ISBN 0-8014-2104-7
- 1988: Freedom. Philadelphia: Open University Press. ISBN 0-335-15592-8
- 1989: Modernity and the Holocaust. Ithaca, NY: Cornell University Press 1989. ISBN 0-8014-2397-X
- 1990: Paradoxes of Assimilation. New Brunswick: Transaction Publishers.
- 1990: Thinking Sociologically. An Introduction for Everyone. Cambridge, MA: Basil Blackwell. ISBN 0-631-16361-1
- 1991: Modernity and Ambivalence. Ithaca, NY: Cornell University Press. ISBN 0-8014-2603-0
- 1992: Intimations of Postmodernity. London, New York: Routhledge. ISBN 0-415-06750-2
- 1992: Mortality, Immortality and Other Life Strategies. Cambridge: Polity. ISBN 0-7456-1016-1
- 1993: Postmodern Ethics. Cambridge, MA: Basil Blackwell. ISBN 0-631-18693-X
- 1994: Dwa szkice o moralności ponowoczesnej [Two sketches on postmodern morality]. Warszawa: IK.
- 1995: Life in Fragments. Essays in Postmodern Morality. Cambridge, MA: Basil Blackwell. ISBN 0-631-19267-0
- 1996: Alone Again – Ethics After Certainty. London: Demos. ISBN 1-898309-40-X
- 1997: Postmodernity and Its Discontents. New York: New York University Press. ISBN 0-7456-1791-3
- 1995: Ciało i przemoc w obliczu ponowoczesności [Body and Violence in the Face of Postmodernity]. Toruń: Wydawnictwo Naukowe Uniwersytetu Mikołaja Kopernika. ISBN 83-231-0654-1
- 1997 (with Roman Kubicki, Anna Zeidler-Janiszewska): Humanista w ponowoczesnym świecie – rozmowy o sztuce życia, nauce, życiu sztuki i innych sprawach [A Humanist in the Postmodern World – Conversations on the Art of Life, Science, the Life of Art and Other Matters]. Warszawa: Zysk i S-ka. ISBN 83-7150-313-X
- 1998: Work, Consumerism and the New Poor. Philadelphia: Open University Press. ISBN 0-335-20155-5
- 1998: Globalization: The Human Consequences. New York: Columbia University Press. ISBN 0-7456-2012-4
- 1999: In Search of Politics. Cambridge: Polity. ISBN 0-7456-2172-4
- 2000: Liquid Modernity. Cambridge: Polity ISBN 0-7456-2409-X
- 2000 (Peter Beilharz ed.): The Bauman Reader. Oxford: Blackwell Publishers. ISBN 0-631-21492-5)
- 2001: Community. Seeking Safety in an Insecure World. Cambridge: Polity. ISBN 0-7456-2634-3
- 2001: The Individualized Society. Cambridge: Polity. ISBN 0-7456-2506-1
- 2001 (with Keith Tester): Conversations with Zygmunt Bauman. Cambridge: Polity. ISBN 0-7456-2664-5
- 2001 (with Tim May): Thinking Sociologically, 2nd ed. Oxford: Blackwell Publishers. ISBN 0-631-21929-3
- 2002: Society Under Siege. Cambridge: Polity. ISBN 0-7456-2984-9
- 2003: Liquid Love: On the Frailty of Human Bonds, Cambridge: Polity. ISBN 0-7456-2489-8
- 2003: City of Fears, City of Hopes. London: Goldsmiths College. ISBN 1-904158-37-4
- 2004: Wasted Lives. Modernity and its Outcasts. Cambridge: Polity. ISBN 0-7456-3164-9
- 2004: Europe: An Unfinished Adventure. Cambridge: Polity. ISBN 0-7456-3403-6
- 2004: Identity: Conversations with Benedetto Vecchi. Cambridge: Polity. ISBN 0-7456-3308-0
- 2005: Liquid Life. Cambridge: Polity. ISBN 0-7456-3514-8
- 2006: Liquid Fear. Cambridge: Polity. ISBN 0-7456-3680-2
- 2006: Liquid Times: Living in an Age of Uncertainty. Cambridge: Polity. ISBN 0-7456-3987-9
- 2006: Moralność w niestabilnym świecie [Morality in an instable World]. Poznań: Księgarnia św. Wojciecha. ISBN 83-7015-863-3
- 2007: Consuming Life. Cambridge: Polity. ISBN 0-7456-4002-8
- 2008: Does Ethics Have a Chance in a World of Consumers? Cambridge, MA: Harvard University Press. ISBN 0-674-02780-9
- 2008: The Art of Life. Cambridge: Polity. ISBN 0-7456-4326-4
- 2009: Living on Borrowed Time: Conversations with Citlali Rovirosa-Madrazo. Cambridge: Polity. ISBN 978-0-7456-4738-8
- 2009: (with Roman Kubicki, Anna Zeidler-Janiszewska) Życie w kontekstach. Rozmowy o tym, co za nami i o tym, co przed nami. [Life in contexts. Conversations about what lies behind us and what lies ahead of us.] Warszawa: WAiP. ISBN 978-83-61408-77-2
- 2010: 44 Letters from the Liquid Modern World. Cambridge: Polity. ISBN 978-0-7456-5056-2
- 2011: Collateral Damage: Social Inequalities in a Global Age. Cambridge: Polity. ISBN 978-0-7456-5294-8
- 2011: Culture in a Liquid Modern World. Cambridge: Polity. ISBN 978-0-7456-5355-6
- 2012: This is Not a Diary. Cambridge: Polity. ISBN 978-0-7456-5570-3
- 2012: (with David Lyon) Liquid Surveillance: A Conversation. Cambridge: Polity. ISBN 978-0-7456-6282-4
- 2013 (with Leonidas Donskis): Moral Blindness: The Loss of Sensitivity in Liquid Modernity. Cambridge: Polity. ISBN 978-0-7456-6274-9
- 2013 (with Stanisław Obirek): O bogu i człowieku. Rozmowy. Kraków: Wydawnictwo Literackie. ISBN 978-83-08-05089-7
  - translated as Of God and Man. Cambridge: Polity. ISBN 978-0-7456-9568-6
- 2013 (with Michael Hviid Jacobsen and Keith Tester): What use is sociology? Conversations with Michael Hviid Jacobsen and Keith Tester. Cambridge: Polity. ISBN 978-0-7456-7124-6
- 2013: Does the Richness of the Few Benefit Us All? Cambridge: Polity. ISBN 978-0-7456-7109-3
- 2014: (with Carlo Bordoni) State of Crisis. Cambridge: Polity. ISBN 978-0-7456-8095-8
- 2015: (with Rein Raud) Practices of Selfhood. Cambridge: Polity. ISBN 978-0-7456-9017-9
- 2015: (with Irena Bauman, Jerzy Kociatkiewicz, and Monika Kostera) Management in a Liquid Modern World. Cambridge: Polity. ISBN 978-1-5095-0222-6
- 2015: (with Stanisław Obirek) Of God and Man, Cambridge: Polity Press.ISBN 978-0-7456-9568-6.
- 2015: (with Stanisław Obirek) On the World and Ourselves, Cambridge: Polity. ISBN 978-0-7456-8711-7.
- 2016: (with Leonidas Donskis) Liquid Evil. Cambridge: Polity. ISBN 978-1-5095-0812-9
- 2016: (with Ezio Mauro) Babel. Cambridge: Polity. ISBN 978-1-5095-0760-3
- 2016: Strangers at Our Door. Cambridge: Polity. ISBN 978-1-5095-1217-1
- 2017: Retrotopia. Cambridge: Polity. ISBN 978-1-5095-1531-8
- 2017: (with Thomas Leoncini) Nati Liquidi. Sperling & Kupfler. ISBN 978-88-200-6266-8
- 2017: Zygmunt Bauman. Das Vertraute unvertraut machen. Ein Gespräch mit Peter Haffner, Hoffmann und Campe, Hamburg 2017, ISBN 978-3-455-00153-2
- 2017: A Chronicle of Crisis: 2011–2016. Social Europe Editions. ISBN 1-9997151-0-1

== See also ==
- Leszek Kołakowski
