= Anna Sfard =

Israeli psychologist of mathematics education

- אנה ספרד
- Education: University of Warsaw; Hebrew University of Jerusalem
- Known for: Commognition
- Father: Zygmunt Bauman
- Scientific career
- Fields: Psychology
- Workplaces: University of Haifa
- Thesis: Teaching Theory of Algorithms in High-School (1989)
- Doctoral advisor: Menachem Magidor; Michael Maschler

Anna B. Sfard (Hebrew: אנה ספרד) is a retired Israeli psychologist of mathematics education, focusing on the roles of communication and reification in mathematical reasoning. She introduced commognition, a theory of learning that defines thinking as communicating with oneself. She is a professor emerita of Mathematics Learning Sciences at the University of Haifa.

== Education and career ==
Sfard is the daughter of sociologist and philosopher Zygmunt Bauman. She began studying physics at the University of Warsaw in Poland in 1967. However, before completing her studies there, she moved to Israel with her father during the 1968 Polish political crisis, and entered the Hebrew University of Jerusalem. She earned a bachelor's degree in mathematics and physics there in 1972, a master's degree in mathematics in 1977, and a Ph.D. in 1989. Her doctoral dissertation, Teaching Theory of Algorithms in High-School, was jointly supervised by Menachem Magidor and Michael Maschler.

After postdoctoral research in the UK, US, and Canada, she became an assistant professor of mathematics education at the University of Haifa in 1995. She was promoted to full professor there in 2001. She has also been Lappan-Phillips-Fitzgerald Professor of Mathematics Education at Michigan State University from 2003 to 2007, and Chair of Mathematics Education at the University of London from 2007 to 2009.

== Selected publications ==
Sfard is the author of the book Thinking as communicating: Human development, development of discourses, and mathematizing (Cambridge University Press, 2008).

She is also the author of two translations and the editor of several edited volumes in mathematics education.

Her research articles include:

- Sfard, Anna (February 1991), "On the dual nature of mathematical conceptions: reflections on processes and objects as different sides of the same coin", Educational Studies in Mathematics, 22 (1): 1–36, doi:10.1007/bf00302715
- Sfard, Anna; Linchevski, Liora (March 1994), "The gains and the pitfalls of reification – the case of algebra", Educational Studies in Mathematics, 26 (2–3): 191–228, doi:10.1007/bf01273663
- Sfard, Anna (March 1998), "On two metaphors for learning and the dangers of choosing just one", Educational Researcher, 27 (2): 4–13, doi:10.3102/0013189x027002004
- Sfard, Anna (2001), "There is more to discourse than meets the ears: looking at thinking as communicating to learn more about mathematical learning", Educational Studies in Mathematics, 46 (1–3): 13–57, doi:10.1023/a:1014097416157
- Sfard, Anna; Kieran, Carolyn (February 2001), "Cognition as communication: rethinking learning-by-talking through multi-faceted analysis of students' mathematical interactions", Mind, Culture, and Activity, 8 (1): 42–76, doi:10.1207/s15327884mca0801_04
- Sfard, Anna; Prusak, Anna (May 2005), "Telling identities: in search of an analytic tool for investigating learning as a culturally shaped activity", Educational Researcher, 34 (4): 14–22, doi:10.3102/0013189x034004014
- Sfard, Anna (October 2007), "When the rules of discourse change, but nobody tells you: making sense of mathematics learning from a commognitive standpoint", Journal of the Learning Sciences, 16 (4): 565–613, doi:10.1080/10508400701525253

== Recognition ==
Sfard was the recipient of the 2007 Hans Freudenthal Award of the International Commission on Mathematical Instruction, "in recognition of her highly significant and scientifically deep accomplishments within a consistent, long-term research programme focused on objectification and discourse in mathematics education".

She was elected as a Fellow of the American Educational Research Association in 2015. She was elected as an international associate of the National Academy of Education in 2016, and as an international honorary member of the American Academy of Arts and Sciences in 2023.

She was an invited speaker at the 2022 (virtual) International Congress of Mathematicians.
