= COVID-19 pandemic in Liechtenstein =

Aspect of viral disease pandemic

- Disease: COVID-19
- Pathogen: SARS-CoV-2
- Location: Liechtenstein
- First outbreak: Wuhan, China
- Index case: Vaduz
- Arrival date: 3 March 2020 (6 years, 5 months, 3 weeks and 2 days)
- Date: As of 5 May 2024
- Confirmed cases: 21,574
- Recovered: 21480
- Deaths: 94
- Fatality rate: 0.4%

Government website
- https://www.llv.li/en/individuals/health-care-and-care/diseases-and-risks/post-covid-19

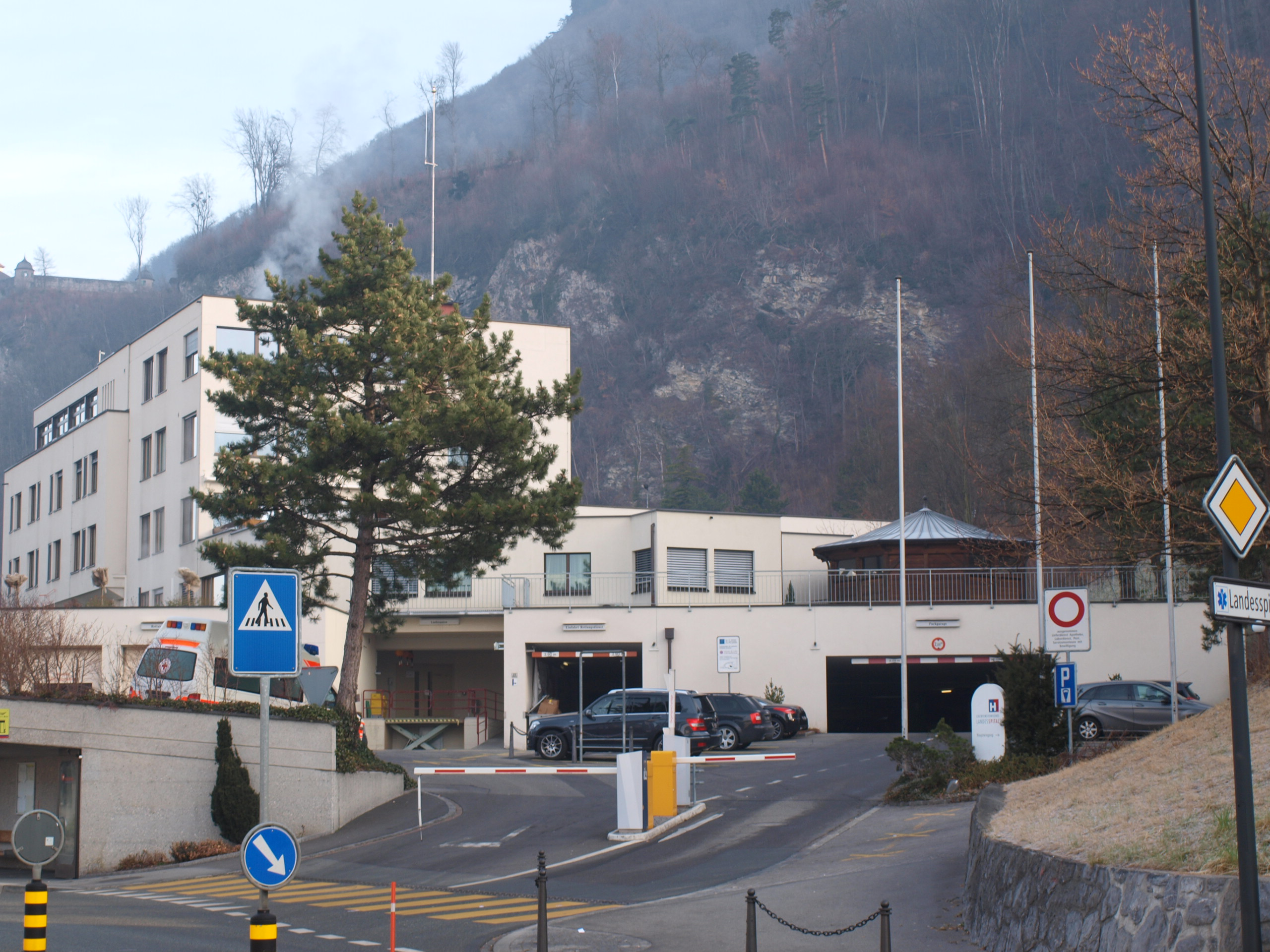
Liechtenstein State Hospital, which plays a key role in dealing with COVID-19 in Liechtenstein

The COVID-19 pandemic in Liechtenstein was a part of the worldwide pandemic of coronavirus disease 2019 (COVID-19) caused by severe acute respiratory syndrome coronavirus 2 (SARS-CoV-2). The virus was confirmed to have reached Liechtenstein in early March 2020.

As of 27 October 2023, a total of 74,330 vaccine doses had been administered.

== Background ==
On 12 January 2020, the World Health Organization (WHO) confirmed that a novel coronavirus was the cause of a respiratory illness in a cluster of people in Wuhan City, Hubei Province, China, which was reported to the WHO on 31 December 2019.

The case fatality ratio for COVID-19 was significantly lower than the 2002–2004 SARS outbreak, but the transmission was much greater.

== Timeline ==
=== February 2020 ===
On 11 February, the government of Liechtenstein set up a "new coronavirus 2019-nCoV" staff, which, under the chairmanship of the government councilor Mauro Pedrazzini, monitored developments related to the novel coronavirus and coordinated necessary measures for Liechtenstein. On 26 February, the government announced that the country was already preparing extensively for possible COVID-19 cases, although there had at the time been no confirmed reports. On 27 February, the government announced that the first two suspected cases in Liechtenstein had tested negative. In addition, the population was made aware of various informative pages on the novel coronavirus.

=== March 2020 ===
On 3 March, the first case was reported in the country with a person who had contact with an infected person in Switzerland. He developed symptoms and turned himself in to the state hospital where he was confirmed to have the new virus. He was isolated at the state hospital.

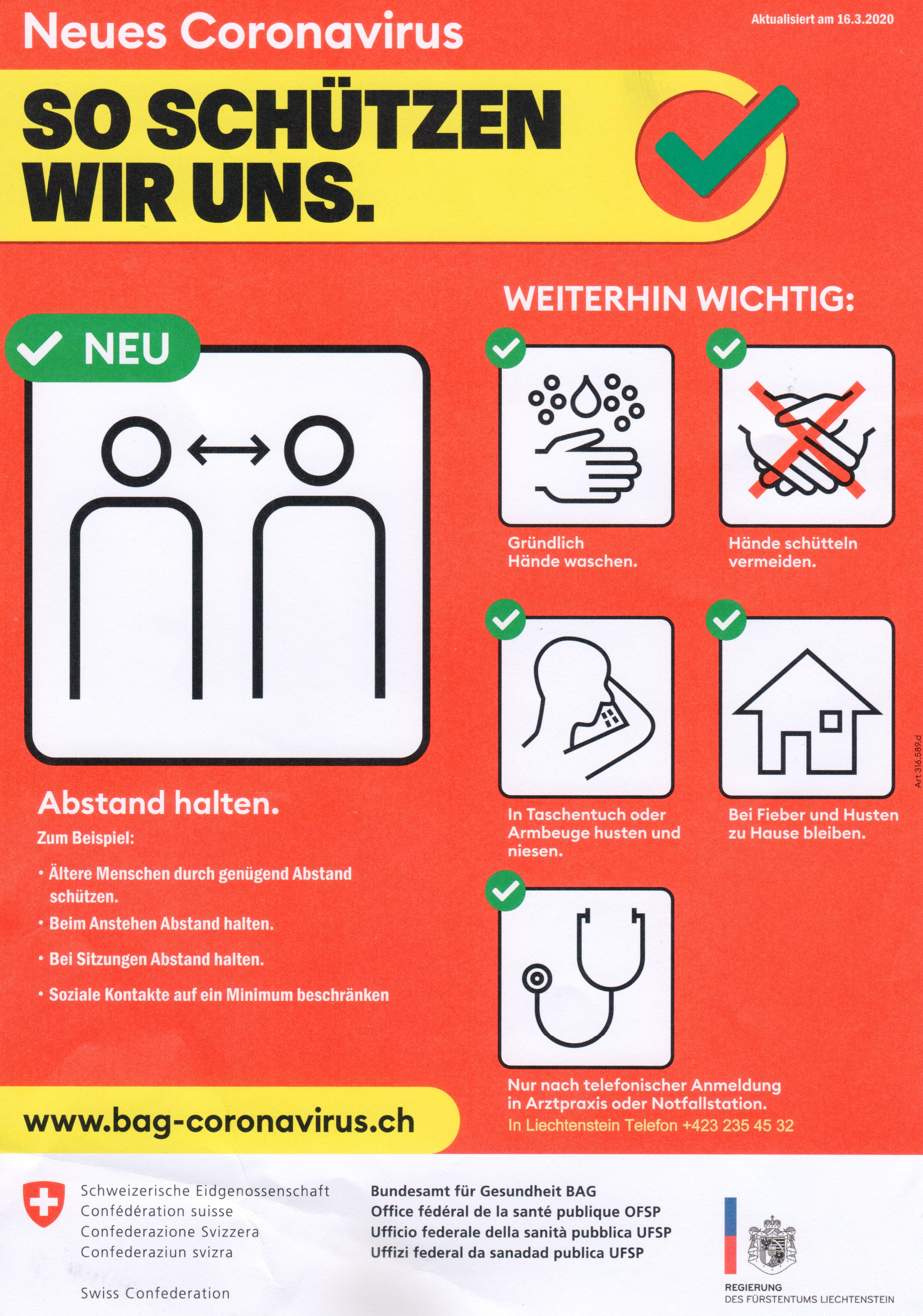
COVID-19 prevention guidance released by the governments of Switzerland and Liechtenstein

On 16 March, the government of Liechtenstein announced considerable restrictions on social life in Liechtenstein, such as restrictive event rules and bans on entertainment and leisure activities to slow the spread of COVID-19 in the country. On 17 March (general ban on events and further closings) and 20 March (further reduction of social contacts), the measures were tightened again by the government.

On 21 March, the Liechtenstein State Police announced that three police officers had tested positive for COVID-19. All were in quarantine. By 21 March, a total of 44 people living in Liechtenstein had tested positive for COVID-19.

On 23 March, 51 positive cases from Liechtenstein were reported. The government also announced that it would increase the number of hospital beds in Liechtenstein and set up a new test facility.

On 25 March, a total of 53 people living in Liechtenstein had tested positive for COVID-19.

=== April 2020 ===
On 4 April, one person died of COVID-19 in Liechtenstein.

On 28 April, the total number of confirmed COVID-19 cases rose to 83.

=== July 2020 ===
Masks were made mandatory on public transportation on the 6th of July.

=== October 2020 ===
On 24 October, the total number of confirmed COVID-19 cases stood at 227

The following day, the total number increased to 413.

=== January 2021 ===
On 1 January, there were 2088 confirmed cases.

=== April 2022 ===
On 1 April 2022, all Covid-19 measures were abolished including mask and certificate mandates.

== Statistics ==
=== Cases ===
The government of Liechtenstein reported daily notifications on its website about the number of reported cases in the country. As of January 2025, the data is no longer updated and the link leads to a 404 page.

New cases per day

View source data.

=== Deaths ===
Deaths per day

View source data.

=== Tests ===
The following tests were carried out on suspected cases of COVID-19 on the basis of communications from the Government of Liechtenstein:

| Date | Accomplished tests (cumulative) | Tests per 10,000 people |
|---|---|---|
| 27 Feb. 2020 | 2 | 0.52 |
| 28 Feb. 2020 | 5 | 1.29 |
| 2 March 2020 | 8 | 2.07 |
| 3 March 2020 | 14 | 3.62 |
| 4 March 2020 | 16 | 4.14 |
| 5 March 2020 | 18 | 4.66 |
| 6 March 2020 | 22 | 5.69 |
| 9 March 2020 | 24 | 6.21 |
| 10 March 2020 | 37 | 9.57 |
| 11 March 2020 | 50 | 12.94 |
| 12 March 2020 | 57 | 14.75 |
| 14 March 2020 | 99 | 25.61 |
| 23 March 2020 | 750 | 194.05 |
| 26 March 2020 | ~900 | 232.86 |

== See also ==
- COVID-19 pandemic by country and territory
- COVID-19 pandemic in Europe
- COVID-19 pandemic in Switzerland
- COVID-19 pandemic in Austria
