= Liechtenstein National Day =

Public holiday in Liechtenstein

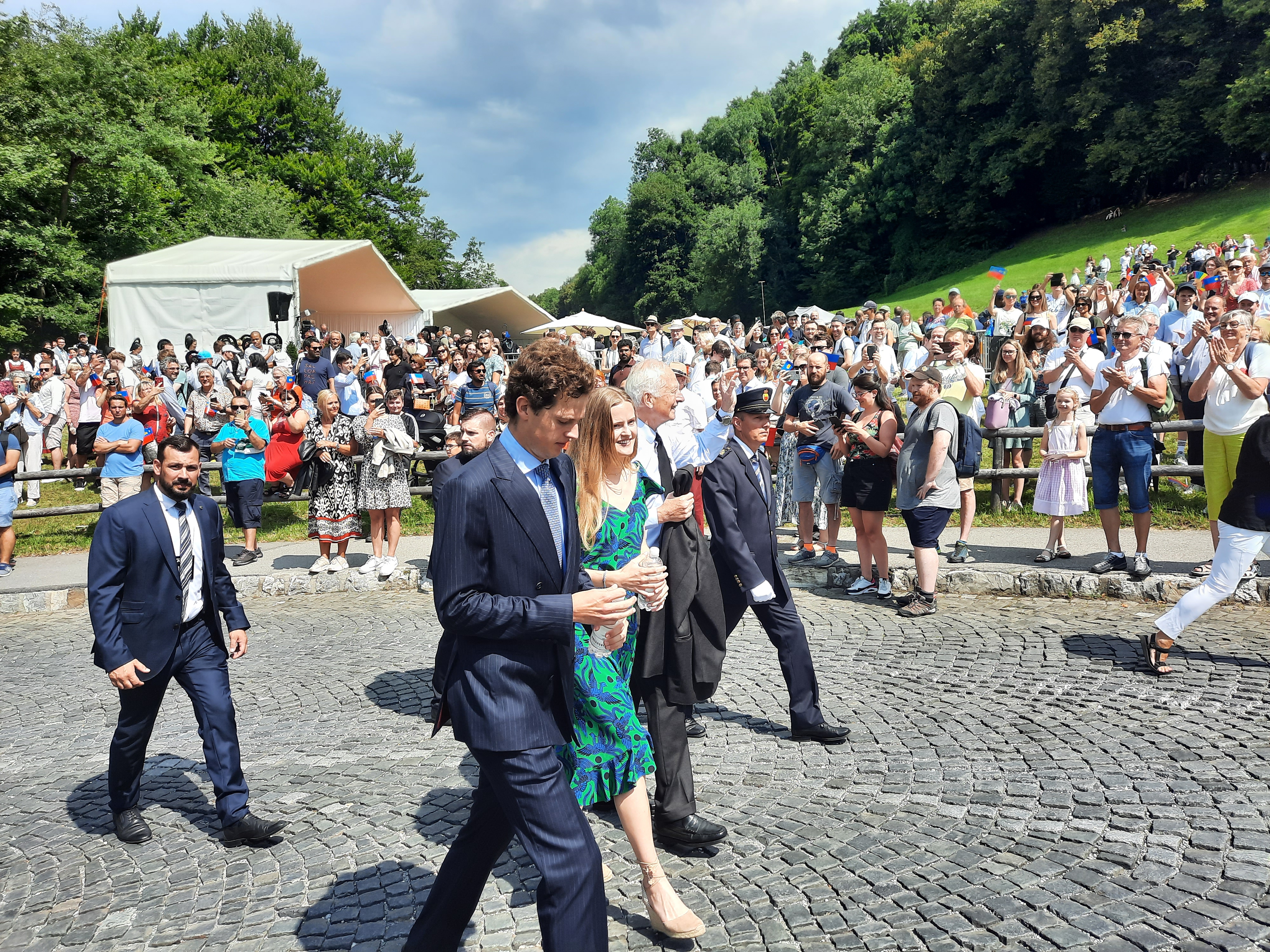
Hans-Adam II at the Liechtenstein National Day 2023

Liechtenstein National Day (German: Staatsfeiertag Liechtenstein) is public holiday held annually on August 15 that jointly celebrates the Assumption of Mary and Liechtenstein's continued independence and values as a country. It was originally created to also celebrate the birthday of Franz Joseph II, which was on the following day.

The day typically involves a ceremony held outside Vaduz Castle with speeches by the prince and the President of the Landtag of Liechtenstein. Afterwards, a folk festival is hosted in Vaduz by a chosen municipality, and then in the evening torches are carried through the Fürstensteig, bonfires are lit, and then a ceremonial firework show is held in Vaduz.

== History ==
The holiday was conceived in 1940 as a means of reinforcing the Liechtenstein's loyalty to the prince and the country's continued independence during World War II. It was also designed to defy the German National Movement in Liechtenstein (VDBL), who sought the annexation of Liechtenstein into Nazi Germany. The first celebration was held on 15 August 1940, during which the VDBL caused provocation by burning a swastika in Triesen and later in Planken. The VDBL ignored the holiday and instead celebrated the birthday of Adolf Hitler on April 20.

The following year in 1941, the fireworks were held for the first time. The process of carrying torches through the Fürstensteig and lighting the bonfires originate from 1943. The holiday continued following the war, and since 1963 the annual folk festival has been held in Vaduz. Since 2022, after the event was cancelled for two years due to the COVID-19 pandemic, the folk festival is now hosted by a chosen municipality but still in Vaduz.

Following the death of Franz Joseph II in 1989, under the recommendation of Hans-Adam II, the Landtag of Liechtenstein voted to keep the holiday. Today, the holiday is not as strong towards personal loyalty to the prince but places a heavier focus on the value of Liechtenstein as a country.
