= 2024–25 FC Vaduz season =

FC Vaduz
2024–25 season
- Manager: Marc Schneider
- Stadium: Rheinpark Stadion
- Swiss Challenge League: 9th
- Liechtenstein Cup: Semi-finals
- UEFA Conference League: Second qualifying round
- Top goalscorer: League: All: Fabrizio Cavegn (2)
- Biggest defeat: St Patrick's Athletic 3–1 Vaduz
- All statistics correct as of 21 July 2024.

The 2024–25 season is the 93rd season in the history of FC Vaduz, and the club's fourth consecutive season in the Swiss Challenge League. In addition to the domestic league, the team is scheduled to participate in the Liechtenstein Cup and the UEFA Conference League.

== Transfers ==
=== In ===
Pos.	Player	Transferred from	Fee	Date	Source
MF	(Germany) Adriano Onyegbule	(Switzerland) Basel	Loan	3 January 2025	

== Friendlies ==
=== Pre-season ===
22 June 2024 Friendly	Vaduz (Liechtenstein)	4–2	(Switzerland) Kriens	Vaduz
14:00	Hasler 13'; Wieser 26'; De Donno 57', 89'		Siegrist 9'; Slišković 22'	Stadium: Rheinpark Stadion

29 June 2024 Friendly	Schwarz-Weiß Bregenz (Austria)	2–3	(Liechtenstein) Vaduz	Bregenz, Austria
11:00	Vucenovic 36'; Krnjić 71'	Report	Eberhard 21'; Schwizer 28' (pen.); Emini 52'

5 July 2024 Friendly	WSG Tirol (Austria)	2–4	(Liechtenstein) Vaduz	Hall in Tirol, Austria
14:00	Müller 38' (pen.); Diarra 56'	Report	Cavegn 4', 78'; Emini 53'; De Donno 82'

13 July 2024 Friendly	Vaduz (Liechtenstein)	0–1	(Switzerland) St. Gallen	Vaduz
14:00		Report	Witzig 54'	Stadium: Rheinpark Stadion; Attendance: 1,568; Referee: Hüseyin Sanli

== Competitions ==
=== Overall record ===
Competition	First match	Last match	Starting round	Record							
Competition	First match	Last match	Starting round	Pld	W	D	L	GF	GA	GD	Win %
Swiss Challenge League	21 July 2024		Matchday 1	14	5	5	4	18	20	−2	35.71
Liechtenstein Cup				2	2	0	0	23	0	+23	100.00
UEFA Conference League	25 July 2024		Second qualifying round	2	0	1	1	3	5	−2	0.00
Total				18	7	6	5	44	25	+19	38.89

Last updated: 1 August 2024
Source: Soccerway

=== Swiss Challenge League ===
==== League table ====
Pos	Team	Pld	W	D	L	GF	GA	GD	Pts	Promotion, qualification or relegation
4	Lausanne Ouchy	36	14	11	11	54	43	+11	53	
5	Wil	36	14	11	11	60	55	+5	53	
6	Vaduz	36	13	12	11	48	49	−1	51	Qualification for Conference League second qualifying round (Note: Vaduz qualified for the Conference League second qualifying round by winning the 2024–25 Liechtenstein Cup.)
7	Bellinzona (Note: Bellinzona were deducted 3 points on 16 December 2024 (confirmed on 22 January 2025), for failing to report social contribution payments. This decision was partially overturned by CAS on 25 April 2025 (Bellinzona are still fined SFr 30,000).)	36	11	11	14	47	60	−13	44	
8	Xamax	36	12	5	19	57	65	−8	41	

Source: Swiss Challenge League
Rules for classification: 1) Points; 2) Goal difference; 3) Goals scored; 4) Head-to-head goal difference; 5) Head-to-head goals scored 6) Away goals scored; 7) Draw.

==== Results summary ====
Overall								Home						Away					
Pld	W	D	L	GF	GA	GD	Pts	W	D	L	GF	GA	GD	W	D	L	GF	GA	GD
2	0	1	1	0	2	−2	1	0	1	0	0	0	0	0	0	1	0	2	−2

Last updated: 28 July 2024.

==== Results by round ====
Round	1	2	3	4	5	6	7	8	9	10	11	12	13	14	15	16	17	18	19
Ground	H	A	H	A	H	A	H	A	H	A	H	A	A	H	A	H	A	H	A
Result	D	L	W	D	W	L	L	L	W	D	W	D	D	W	D	D	W	W	
Position	5	9																	

Updated to match(es) played on 28 July 2024. Source:
A = Away; H = Home; W = Win; D = Draw; L = Loss

==== Matches ====
The match schedule was released on 18 June 2024.

21 July 2024 1	Vaduz	0–0	Stade Nyonnais	Vaduz
14:15	Wieser (yellow card) 38'; Mertens (yellow card) 59'; Simani (yellow card) 75'; De Donno (yellow card) 81'		Petit-Viretti (red card) 45+2'; Machado Correia (yellow card) 62'	Stadium: Rheinpark Stadium; Attendance: 1,145; Referee: David Huwiler

28 July 2024 2	Thun	2–0	Vaduz	Thun
16:30	Bertone 53'; Frith 81'			Stadium: Stockhorn Arena; Attendance: 4,172; Referee: Maxime Odiet

4 August 2024 3	Vaduz	3–2	Wil	Vaduz
14:15				Stadium: Rheinpark Stadium

11 August 2024 4	Schaffhausen	1–1	Vaduz

25 August 2024 5	Vaduz	3–1	Lausanne Ouchy

30 August 2024 6	Xamax	4–1	Vaduz

20 September 2024 7	Vaduz	2–5	Aarau

24 September 2024 8	Étoile Carouge	1–0	Vaduz

29 September 2024 9	Vaduz	2–1	Bellinzona

5 October 2024 10	Aarau	0–0	Vaduz

19 October 2024 11	Vaduz	2–0	Thun

25 October 2024 12	Wil	0–0	Vaduz

1 November 2024 13	Lausanne Ouchy	2–2	Vaduz

8 November 2024 14	Vaduz	2–1	Xamax

22 November/3 December 2024 15	Stade Nyonnais	1–1	Vaduz

29 November 2024 16	Vaduz	2–2	Schaffhausen

8 December 2024 17	Bellinzona	1–2	Vaduz

14 December 2024 18	Vaduz	3–2	Étoile Carouge

24 January 2025 19	Thun	3–1	Vaduz

1 February 2025 20	Vaduz	1–1	Stade Nyonnais

9 February 2025 21	Vaduz	1–0	Wil

14 February 2025 22	Xamax	0–0	Vaduz

23 February 2025 23	Vaduz	0–1	Aarau

2 March 2025 24	Étoile Carouge	3–2	Vaduz

7 March 2025 25	Schaffhausen	1–1	Vaduz

16 March 2025 26	Vaduz	3–1	Bellinzona

28 March 2025 27	Vaduz	0–1	Lausanne Ouchy

1 April 2025 28	Wil	0–3	Vaduz

6 April 2025 29	Vaduz	2–1	Xamax

12 April 2025 30	Bellinzona	3–1	Vaduz

18 April 2025 31	Aarau	2–2	Vaduz

27 April 2025 32	Vaduz	1–0	Étoile Carouge

2 May 2025 33	Stade Nyonnais	1–0	Vaduz

11 May 2025 34	Vaduz	3–3	Thun

16 May 2025 35	Vaduz	1–0	Schaffhausen

23 May 2025 36	Lausanne Ouchy	2–0	Vaduz

=== Liechtenstein Cup ===
17 September 2024 Round of 16	Triesen	0–13	Vaduz
			Del Toro 12', 33'; Cavegn 14', 37'; Simani 39'; De Donno 60', 82'; Eberhard 65', 69', 74'; Crescenti 83'; Mertens 88'; Kräuchi 90'

16 October 2024 Quarter-finals	Triesenberg II	0–10	Vaduz
			Keckeisen 2'; Cavegn 4', 8', 20' (pen.); Navarro 14', 26'; Lüchinger 50'; Schwizer 55'; De Donno 79'; Del Toro 82'

23 April 2025 Semi-finals	Eschen/Mauren	3–7	Vaduz
	Adejumo 53'; Timbó 61'; Becegato de Mello 89'		Traber 20'; Eberhard 37'; Eduardo 46', 54'; Hammerich 65'; Cavegn 73'; Deme 75'

21 May 2025 Final	Balzers	2–3	Vaduz
	Murati 15'; Forrer 49'		Cavegn 65', 79'; Navarro 75'

=== UEFA Conference League ===
==== Second qualifying round ====
The draw was held on 19 June 2024.

25 July 2024 First leg	St Patrick's Athletic (Republic of Ireland)	3–1	(Liechtenstein) Vaduz	Dublin, Republic of Ireland
19:45 UTC+1	Mulraney 6', 17'; Redmond 77'	Report	Emini (yellow card) 16'; Beeli (yellow card) 29'; Kräuchi (yellow card) 55'; Del Toro 64'; Berisha (yellow card) 90'	Stadium: Richmond Park; Referee: Tom Owen (Wales)

1 August 2024 Second leg	Vaduz (Liechtenstein)	2–2 (3–5 agg.)	(Republic of Ireland) St Patrick's Athletic	Vaduz
19:30 UTC+2	Cavegn 22' (pen.), 76'	Report	Elbouzedi 28'; Palmer 81'	Stadium: Rheinpark Stadion
