= 2018–19 Liechtenstein Cup =

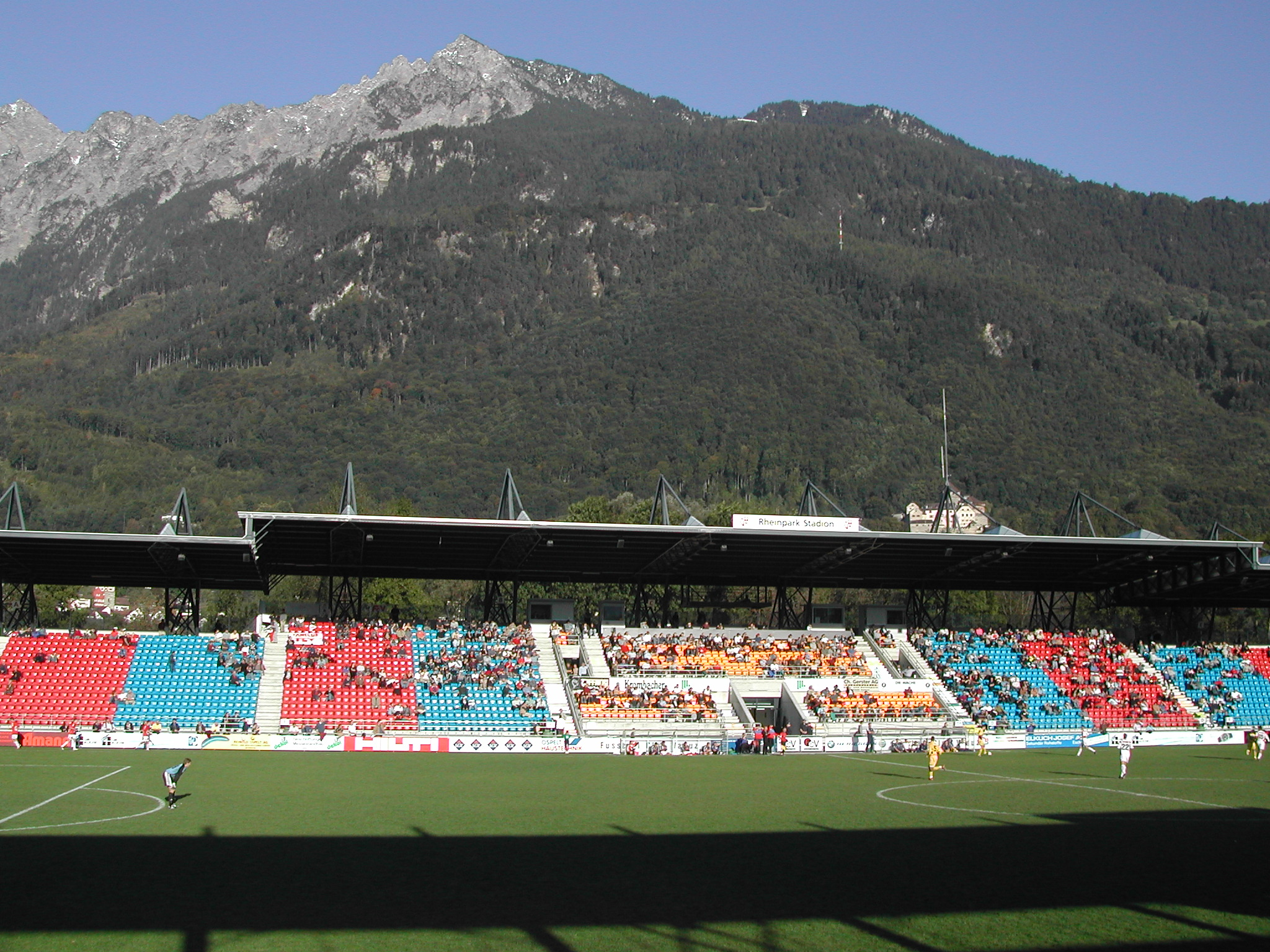

Tournament details
- Country: Liechtenstein
- Teams: 7 (and 8 reserve teams)

Final positions
- Champions: FC Vaduz
- Runners-up: FC Ruggell

Tournament statistics
- Matches played: 14
- Goals scored: 52 (3.71 per match)

The 2018–19 Liechtenstein Cup was the 74th season of Liechtenstein's annual cup competition. Seven clubs competed with a total of 15 teams for one spot in the first qualifying round of the 2019–20 UEFA Europa League. FC Vaduz were the defending champions.

== Participating clubs ==
**2018–19 Challenge League** (2nd tier)	**2018–19 1. Liga** (4th tier)	**2018–19 2. Liga Interregional** (5th tier)	**2018–19 2. Liga** (6th tier)	**2018–19 3. Liga** (7th tier)	**2018–19 4. Liga** (8th tier)	**2018–19 5. Liga** (9th tier)
**FC Vaduz** ^{TH}	**USV Eschen/Mauren**	FC Balzers	**FC Ruggell**	FC Balzers II; USV Eschen/Mauren II; FC Triesenberg	FC Balzers III; FC Ruggell II; **FC Schaan**; FC Schaan II; FC Triesen; FC Triesen II	USV Eschen/Mauren III; FC Triesenberg II

Teams in bold are still active in the competition.

^{TH} Title holders.

== First round ==
The first round involved all except the four highest-placed teams. Five teams received a bye to the second round by drawing of lot. FC Vaduz II did not enter the competition.

Team 1	Score	Team 2
**21 August 2018**
**FC Triesenberg** (7)	4–1	FC Balzers II (7)
**22 August 2018**
FC Schaan II (8)	0–3	**FC Ruggell II** (8)
**28 August 2018**
FC Triesenberg II (9)	1–2	**USV Eschen/Mauren III** (9)

== Second round ==
The second round involved all except the four highest-placed teams.

Team 1	Score	Team 2
**12 September 2018**
FC Triesen (8)	0–1	**USV Eschen/Mauren II** (7)
**25 September 2018**
**FC Ruggell II** (8)	4–1	FC Balzers III (8)
FC Triesen II (8)	1–5	**FC Schaan** (8)
USV Eschen/Mauren III (9)	0–4	**FC Triesenberg** (7)

== Quarterfinals ==
The quarterfinals involved the four teams who won in the second round, as well as the top four highest placed teams (FC Vaduz, FC Balzers, USV Eschen/Mauren and FC Ruggell).

Team 1	Score	Team 2
**23 October 2018**
FC Triesenberg (7)	1–5	**USV Eschen/Mauren** (4)
FC Ruggell II (8)	0–3	**FC Schaan** (8)
**24 October 2018**
USV Eschen/Mauren II (7)	1–5	**FC Ruggell** (6)
**7 November 2018**
FC Balzers (5)	1–2	**FC Vaduz** (2)

== Semifinals ==
Team 1	Score	Team 2
**9 April 2019**
USV Eschen/Mauren (4)	0–1	**FC Vaduz** (2)
FC Schaan (8)	0–1 (a.e.t.)	**FC Ruggell** (6)

== Final ==
2 May 2019
17:00

FC Vaduz	3–2	FC Ruggell
Wieser 36'; Coulibaly 52'; Sülüngöz 77'	Report	Kollmann 45'; Zeqiri 86' (pen.)

Rheinpark Stadion, Vaduz
Attendance: 1,122
Referee: Alessandro Dudic (Switzerland)
