= Fabrizio Cavegn =

Swiss footballer (born 2002)

Personal information
- Full name: Fabrizio Cavegn
- Date of birth: 26 August 2002 (age 24)
- Place of birth: Ilanz, Switzerland
- Height: 1.78 m (5 ft 10 in)
- Position: Forward

Team information
- Current team: Bristol Rovers
- Number: 29

Youth career
- FCO Südostschweiz

Senior career*
Years	Team	Apps	(Gls)
2020–2021	FC Chur 97	12	(3)
2021–2023	FC St. Gallen II	53	(42)
2022–2023	FC St. Gallen	4	(0)
2023–2025	FC Vaduz	73	(25)
2025–	Bristol Rovers	57	(14)

International career
- Switzerland U21
- * Club domestic league appearances and goals as of 16:26, 14 November 2026 (UTC)

Fabrizio Cavegn (born 28 August 2002) is a Swiss professional footballer who plays as a forward for English club Bristol Rovers.

== Club career ==
=== Early career ===
Born in Ilanz, Cavegn began his career at FCO Südostschweiz and FC Chur 97, before moving to FC St. Gallen in 2021. He played for the St. Gallen second team, including scoring a hat-trick in October 2022 against FC Bulle. He made 4 league appearances and 1 Cup appearance for the St. Gallen first team, scoring once in the Cup.

He moved FC Vaduz in April 2023, signing a two-year contract. In January 2024 his contract was extended to 2026. He was linked with a transfer away from the club in April 2025. Cavegn was a two-time Liechtenstein Football Cup champion with Vaduz, qualifying the club for European football.

=== Bristol Rovers ===
On 1 August 2025, Cavegn signed for English League Two club Bristol Rovers on a three-year deal for an undisclosed fee. On 26 August, he scored his first goals in English football, scoring a second-half brace from the bench in a 4–4 EFL Trophy draw with Tottenham Hotspur U21, also scoring his penalty in the subsequent shoot-out victory. He scored his first league goal on 13 September 2025. Having scored this first league goal, he scored in the following two matches also, being named the Club's Player of the Month for September.

On 1 January 2026, Cavegn scored a first hat-trick in English football, scoring all three goals as the Gas defeated Shrewsbury Town 3–0 for a first victory in fourteen matches. Having finished his first season with a total of fifteen goals in all competitions, he was named Supporters' Club Young Player of the Season and Player of the Year

== International career ==
Cavegn represented Switzerland at under-21 level.

== Career statistics ==
As of match played 14 November 2026

Appearances and goals by club, season and competition
Club	Season	League			National Cup		League Cup		Europe		Other		Total	
Club	Season	Division	Apps	Goals	Apps	Goals	Apps	Goals	Apps	Goals	Apps	Goals	Apps	Goals
FC Chur 97	2020–21	2. Liga Interregional	12	3	0	0	—		—		—		12	3
FC St. Gallen II	2021–22	1. Liga Classic	26	20	—		—		—		—		26	23
FC St. Gallen II	2022–23	Promotion League	27	22	—		—		—		—		27	22
FC St. Gallen II	Total		53	42	0	0	—		—		—		53	42
FC St. Gallen	2022–23	Swiss Super League	4	0	1	1	—		—		—		5	1
FC Vaduz	2023–24	Swiss Challenge League	36	12	4	1	—		2 (Note: Appearance(s) in UEFA Conference League)	1	—		42	14
FC Vaduz	2024–25	Swiss Challenge League	36	13	4	8	—		2	2	—		42	23
FC Vaduz	2025–26	Swiss Challenge League	1	0	0	0	—		1	0	—		2	0
FC Vaduz	Total		73	25	8	9	0	0	5	3	0	0	86	37
Bristol Rovers	2025–26	EFL League Two	43	11	2	1	1	0	—		5 (Note: Appearance(s) in EFL Trophy)	3	51	15
Bristol Rovers	2026–27	EFL League Two	14	3	1	1	1	0	—		0	0	16	4
Bristol Rovers	Total		57	14	3	2	2	0	0	0	5	3	67	19
Career total			200	84	12	12	2	0	5	3	5	3	224	102

== Honours ==
FC Vaduz

- Liechtenstein Football Cup: 2023–24, 2024–25

Individual

- Bristol Rovers Player of the Year: 2025–26
- Bristol Rovers Supporters' Club Young Player of the Season: 2025–26
