= Slišković =

Slišković is a surname. Notable people with the surname include:

- Blaž Slišković (born 1959), Bosnian football manager and player, father of Vladimir
- Dragan Slišković (1942–2009), Yugoslav footballer
- Gloria Slišković (born 2005), Bosnian footballer
- Iva Slišković (born 1984), Croatian basketball player
- Ivan Slišković (born 1991), Croatian handball player
- Luka Slišković (born 1995), Swiss footballer
- Petar Slišković (born 1991), Croatian footballer
- Vladimir Slišković (born 1983), Bosnian football manager and player
- Zoran Slišković (born 1966), Croatian footballer
