= 2025–26 Swiss Challenge League =

Swiss Challenge League
- Season: 2025–26
- Dates: 25 July 2025 – May 2026
- Champions: Vaduz (4th title)
- Promoted: Vaduz
- Relegated: Bellinzona
- Conference League: Vaduz
- Matches: 140
- Goals: 396 (2.83 per match)
- Top goalscorer: Shkelqim Demhasaj (Xamax, 16 goals)
- Biggest home win: 6–0; Vaduz–Bellinzona (22 Aug '25)
- Biggest away win: 1–5; Bellinzona–Xamax (2 Aug '25); 0–4; Rapperswil-Jona–Vaduz (12 Dec '25); 0–4; Bellinzona–Yverdon (27 Feb '26)
- Highest scoring: 4–5; Nyon–Aarau (22 Aug '25)
- Longest winning run: Vaduz (11) (rounds 9 to 19)
- Longest unbeaten run: Vaduz (12) (rounds 8 to 19)
- Longest winless run: Bellinzona (12) (rounds 1 to 12); Nyon (12) (rounds 15 to 26)
- Longest losing run: Bellinzona (4) (rounds 9 to 12); Wil (4) (rounds 4 to 7)
- Highest attendance: 7.186; Aarau–Vaduz (13 Mar '26)
- Lowest attendance: 285; Bellinzona–Vaduz (21 Nov '25)
- All statistics correct as of 6 April 2026.

The 2025–26 Swiss Challenge League (referred to as the Dieci Challenge League for sponsoring reasons) is the 128th season of the second tier of competitive football in Switzerland and the 23rd season under its current name.

== Teams ==
On 24 May 2025, Rapperswil-Jona returned to the Challenge League after a 6-year absence. On 22 May 2025, Yverdon-Sport, relegated from the Super League, returned to the second series after a two-year absence. They replace last season's Challenge League champions Thun, who returned to the top flight after a 5-year absence, and Schaffhausen, who were relegated to the Swiss Promotion League after 12 seasons in the Challenge League.

=== Team changes ===
Promoted from 2024–25 Swiss Promotion League	Relegated from 2024–25 Swiss Super League	Promoted to 2025–26 Swiss Super League	Relegated to 2025-26 Swiss Promotion League
Rapperswil-Jona	Yverdon-Sport	Thun	Schaffhausen

=== Stadia and locations ===
Locations of clubs in the 2025-26 Swiss Challenge League teams

Team	Location	Stadium	Capacity	Ref
FC Aarau	Aarau	Stadion Brügglifeld	8,000	
AC Bellinzona	Bellinzona	Stadio Comunale	5,000	
Étoile Carouge FC	Carouge	Stade de la Fontenette	3,600	
FC Stade Lausanne-Ouchy	Lausanne	Stade Olympique (Note: Stade-Lausanne-Ouchy's home stadium Stade Juan-Antonio-Samaranch in Lausanne can not accommodate SLO for the Challenge League. SLO will play at the Stade Olympique de la Pontaise in Lausanne.)	15,850	
FC Rapperswil-Jona	Rapperswil-Jona	Stadion Grünfeld	3,200	
FC Stade Nyonnais	Nyon	Stade de Colovray	7,200	
FC Vaduz	(Liechtenstein) Vaduz	Rheinpark Stadion	7,584	
FC Wil 1900	Wil	Lidl Arena	6,958	
Neuchâtel Xamax	Neuchâtel	Stade de la Maladière	11,997	
Yverdon-Sport	Yverdon	Stade Municipal	4,200	

No. of teams	Cantons	Team(s)
3
3	Vaud	Lausanne Ouchy, Nyon, Yverdon-Sport
2
2	St. Gallen	Rapperswil-Jona, Wil
1
1	Aargau	Aarau
1	Liechtenstein	Vaduz
1	Geneva	Étoile Carouge
1	Neuchâtel	Xamax
1	Ticino	Bellinzona

=== Personnel and kits ===
Team	Manager	Captain	Kit manufacturer	Shirt sponsor
Aarau	(Italy) Brunello Iacopetta	(Switzerland) Marco Thaler	Craft	Aargauische Kantonalbank
Bellinzona	(Italy) Giuseppe Sannino	(Switzerland) Dragan Mihajlović	Acerbis	Dieci
Étoile Carouge	(Brazil) Pedro Nogueira	(Angola) Signori António	Adidas	Scrasa
Lausanne Ouchy	(Slovenia) Dalibor Stevanović	(Ivory Coast) Edmond Akichi	Adidas	Cronos Finance
Nyon	(Switzerland) Andrea Binotto	(Algeria) Melvin Mastil	Adidas	Dieci
Rapperswil-Jona	(Switzerland) Selcuk Sasivari	(Switzerland) Rijad Saliji	Macron	Dieci
Vaduz	(Switzerland) Marc Schneider	(Liechtenstein) Nicolas Hasler	Puma	MBPI
Wil	(Switzerland) Marco Hämmerli	(Switzerland) Kastrijot Ndau	Adidas	WeberPartner
Xamax	(France) Anthony Braizat	(Kosovo) Eris Abedini	Capelli	Groupe E
Yverdon-Sport	(Switzerland) Martin Andermatt	(Switzerland) Anthony Sauthier	Macron	None

=== Managerial changes ===
Team	Outgoing manager	Date of departure	Position in table	Incoming manager	Date of appointment
Bellinzona	(Italy) Giuseppe Sannino	30 June 2025	Pre-season	(Spain) Xavi Andrés Ibarra	1 July 2025
Étoile Carouge	(Romania) Adrian Ursea	30 June 2025	Pre-season	(Brazil) Pedro Nogueira	1 July 2025
Yverdon-Sport	(Italy) Paolo Tramezzani	30 June 2025	Pre-season	(Romania) Adrian Ursea	1 July 2025
Bellinzona	(Spain) Xavi Andrés Ibarra	23 July 2025	Pre-season	(Spain) Manuel Benavente	24 July 2025
Bellinzona	(Spain) Manuel Benavente	24 October 2025	10th	(Italy) Giuseppe Sannino	24 October 2025
Rapperswil-Jona	(Switzerland) David Sesa	2 November 2025	8th	(Switzerland) Selcuk Sasivari	3 November 2025
Yverdon-Sport	(Romania) Adrian Ursea	9 March 2026	3rd	(Switzerland) Martin Andermatt	9 March 2026

== Table ==
Pos	Team	Pld	W	D	L	GF	GA	GD	Pts	Promotion, qualification or relegation
1	Vaduz (C, P)	36	25	6	5	75	41	+34	81	Promotion to Swiss Super League and qualification for the Conference League second qualifying round (Note: Vaduz qualified for the Conference League second qualifying round by winning the 2025–26 Liechtenstein Cup.)
2	Aarau	36	25	5	6	77	47	+30	80	Qualification for promotion play-off
3	Yverdon-Sport	36	20	7	9	75	48	+27	67	
4	Lausanne Ouchy	36	14	8	14	59	51	+8	50	
5	Xamax	36	14	7	15	55	56	−1	49	
6	Rapperswil-Jona	36	14	2	20	52	62	−10	44	
7	Wil	36	10	10	16	39	55	−16	40	
8	Étoile Carouge	36	10	10	16	46	54	−8	40	
9	Nyon	36	5	13	18	33	60	−27	28	
10	Bellinzona (R)	36	5	8	23	40	77	−37	23	Relegation to Swiss Promotion League

Source: Swiss Challenge League
Rules for classification: 1) Points; 2) Goal difference; 3) Goals scored; 4) Head-to-head goal difference; 5) Head-to-head goals scored 6) Away goals scored; 7) Draw.
(C) Champions; (P) Promoted; (R) Relegated

== Results ==
=== First and second rounds ===
Home \ Away	AAR	BEL	ETC	NYO	RAP	SLO	VAD	WIL	XAM	YVE
Aarau	—	1–0	2–1	0–1	2–1	3–0	1–0	2–0	2–0	1–2
Bellinzona	5–1	—	0–3	2–0	1–1	0–3	0–1	0–2	1–5	0–0
Étoile Carouge	1–3	2–0	—	1–1	0–2	1–2	1–1	0–0	0–2	2–1
Nyon	4–5	3–1	0–0	—	1–0	1–2	0–1	2–1	1–1	2–2
Rapperswil-Jona	0–1	2–1	1–0	1–0	—	1–2	0–4	1–2	1–3	0–3
Lausanne Ouchy	1–2	2–2	2–0	3–3	0–2	—	1–1	1–1	3–0	4–0
Vaduz	3–2	6–0	3–1	3–0	3–2	3–2	—	2–1	1–0	2–1
Wil	1–3	0–0	1–0	1–0	1–3	0–0	0–2	—	2–1	2–4
Xamax	1–2	1–0	2–1	1–1	2–1	0–2	1–1	3–1	—	2–2
Yverdon-Sport	1–2	2–0	2–0	1–0	1–0	3–2	3–4	4–0	3–1	—

Source: Swiss Football League
Legend: Blue = home team win; Yellow = draw; Red = away team win.

=== Third and Fourth Rounds ===
Home \ Away	AAR	BEL	ETC	NYO	RAP	SLO	VAD	WIL	XAM	YVE
Aarau	—	1–0	1–3	5–1	5–3	3–0	2–0	2–2	1–0	2–2
Bellinzona	0–0	—	0–3	4–0	2–4	2–1	0–2	2–4	5–0	0–4
Étoile Carouge	0–3	2–2	—	0–0	2–1	1–1	1–2	2–0	1–3	2–2
Nyon	1–1	1–1	2–2	—	2–1	1–3	1–3	0–1	0–0	1–4
Rapperswil-Jona	4–5	2–1	2–1	2–1	—	1–0	0–0	2–0	2–3	1–4
Lausanne Ouchy	4–2	5–0	0–1	1–1	1–2	—	5–2	0–2	2–1	0–3
Vaduz	1–2	3–2	3–3	1–0	2–1	2–2	—	3–1	1–0	2–1
Wil	2–2	3–3	1–3	0–0	0–2	1–0	1–3	—	5–2	0–1
Xamax	1–3	2–1	3–0	4–1	3–2	3–0	1–3	0–0	—	1–2
Yverdon-Sport	1–2	5–2	3–5	1–0	3–1	0–2	2–1	0–0	2–2	—

Source: Swiss Football League
Legend: Blue = home team win; Yellow = draw; Red = away team win.

== Season statistics ==
As of 12 May 2026

=== Top scorers ===
Rank	Player	Club	Goals
1	(Kosovo) Shkelqim Demhasaj	Xamax	21
2	(France) Elias Filet	Aarau	20
3	(Switzerland) Valon Fazliu	Aarau	14
3	(Italy) Antonio Marchesano	Yverdon	14
5	(Brazil) Cleilton Itaitinga	Étoile Carouge	13
6	(Ghana) Daniel Afriyie	Aarau	12
6	(France) Joris Manquant	Nyon	12

=== Assists ===
Rank	Player	Club	Assists
1	(Switzerland) Valon Fazliu	Aarau	11
2	(Switzerland) Elias Pasche	Yverdon	9
3	(Switzerland) Dominik Schwizer	Vaduz	8
4	(Ghana) Daniel Afriyie	Aarau	7
4	(France) Salim Ben Seghir	Xamax	7
4	(France) Landry Nomel	Lausanne-Ouchy	7
4	(Switzerland) Anthony Sauthier	Yverdon	7
4	(Switzerland) Hélios Sessolo	Yverdon	7
4	(Switzerland) Willy Vogt	Bellinzona	7

=== Hat-tricks ===
Player	For	Against	Result	Date
(Switzerland) Valon Fazliu	Aarau	Nyon	4-5 (A)	22 August 2025
(France) Joris Manquant	Nyon	Aarau	4-5 (H)	22 August 2025
(Switzerland) Nathan Garcia	Lausanne-Ouchy	Nyon	3-3 (H)	1 November 2025

=== Clean sheets ===
Rank	Player	Club	Clean sheets
1	(Switzerland) Gentrit Muslija	Wil	12
2	(Germany) Leon Schaffran	Vaduz	11
3	(Switzerland) Marvin Hübel	Aarau	10
4	(Switzerland) Kevin Martin	Yverdon	8
5	(Portugal) Dany da Silva	Lausanne-Ouchy	7

=== Discipline ===
- Most yellow cards: 14
  - (Switzerland) Néhemie Lusuena (Lausanne-Ouchy)
- Most red cards: 2
  - (Colombia) Duván Mosquera (Bellinzona)

== Awards ==
- Player of the Season : (France) Elias Filet (Aarau)
- Coach of the Season : (Switzerland) Marc Schneider (Vaduz)

== Promotion play-off ==
The promotion play-off between the eleventh placed team of the 2025–26 Swiss Super League and the runner up of the Swiss Challenge League will be held following the conclusion of the regular season. The play-off is held over two legs, played home and away, and was originally scheduled on the 20 and 23 May 2026. A draw held on 13 March 2026 decided that the Challenge League side will host the first leg and the Super League side will host the second leg.

Grasshopper's place in the play-off was confirmed on 12 May 2026, following a 3–2 home win against Winterthur. It will be their third consecutive participation in the relegation play-off. Aarau failed to secure direct promotion on the last matchday of the Challenge League on 15 May 2026, but will receive a second chance in the play-off. It will be a reprise of last year's play-off. The relegation play-off was pushed forward by two days, as eleventh placed Grasshopper's home ground Letzigrund would not be available on the date of the second leg. The new dates will be 18 and 21 May 2026.

=== First leg ===
18 May 2026
20:15 CEST (UTC+2)

Aarau	0–0	Grasshopper
	Report

Stadion Brügglifeld, Aarau
Attendance: 8,450
Referee: Anojen Kanagasingam

=== Second leg ===
21 May 2026
20:15 CEST (UTC+2)

Grasshopper	2–1 (a.e.t.)	Aarau
Zvonarek 30'; Ngom 110'	Report	Filet 44'

Letzigrund, Zürich
Attendance: 18,763
Referee: Urs Schnyder

Grasshopper wins 2–1 on aggregate.
