= Javi Navarro (footballer, born 1997) =

Spanish footballer

Personal information
- Full name: Javier Navarro Rodríguez
- Date of birth: 1 January 1997 (age 29)
- Place of birth: Barcelona, Spain
- Height: 1.84 m (6 ft 0 in)
- Position: Winger

Team information
- Current team: Enosis Neon Paralimni

Youth career
- 2004–2012: Espanyol
- 2012–2014: Cornellà
- 2014–2015: Vila Olímpica
- 2015–2016: Málaga

Senior career*
Years	Team	Apps	(Gls)
2016–2018	Europa	38	(9)
2018–2020	Cádiz B	58	(8)
2019–2021	Cádiz	8	(1)
2020	→ Ponferradina (loan)	14	(0)
2020–2021	→ Albacete (loan)	3	(0)
2021–2022	Sanluqueño	32	(3)
2022	San Fernando	14	(0)
2023–2024	Schaffhausen	19	(6)
2024	Wil	16	(1)
2024–2026	Vaduz	48	(2)
2026–	Enosis Neon Paralimni	0	(0)
- * Club domestic league appearances and goals as of 26 May 2026

Javier "Javi" Navarro Rodríguez (born 1 January 1997) is a Spanish footballer who plays as a left winger for Cypriot Second Division club Enosis Neon Paralimni.

== Club career ==
Born in Barcelona, Catalonia, Navarro represented RCD Espanyol, UE Cornellà and CE Vila Olímpica before joining Málaga CF in July 2015. On 7 September 2016, after finishing his formation, he joined Tercera División side CE Europa, and made his senior debut during the campaign.

On 13 June 2017, despite struggling with injuries, Navarro signed a new one-year deal with the Escapulats. The following 31 January, he was transferred to Cádiz CF and was assigned to the reserves also in the fourth division.

Navarro made his first team debut for the Andalusians on 18 August 2019; after coming on as a half-time substitute for Jon Ander Garrido, he scored the equalizer in a 3–1 home defeat of SD Ponferradina in the Segunda División. The following 29 January, he moved to the latter club on loan for the remainder of the season.

On 16 September 2020, Navarro joined fellow second division side Albacete Balompié, on loan for one year. The following 18 January, after suffering a knee injury, his loan was cut short, and his contract was terminated on 13 July 2021.

On August 30 2021, Navarro joined Sanluqueño, on a one-year contract.

On 11 June 2022, Navarro joined San Fernando in the same division, after getting relegated with Sanluqueño.

On 2 January 2023, it was announced that Navarro was joining Schaffhausen of the Swiss second division.

On 29 January 2024, Navarro signed a contract with Wil until the end of the 2023–24 season.

On 10 May 2024, Navarro signed a two-year contract with Vaduz.

== Career statistics ==
As of 19 November 2025

Appearances and goals by club, season and competition
Club	Season	League			National Cup		Continental (Note: Appearances in UEFA Conference League)		Total	
Club	Season	Division	Apps	Goals	Apps	Goals	Apps	Goals	Apps	Goals
Cádiz	2019–20	LaLiga2	8	1	2	0	—		10	1
Ponferradina	2019–20	LaLiga2	14	0	0	0	—		14	0
Albacete	2020–21	LaLiga2	3	0	0	0	—		3	0
Sanluqueño	2021–22	Primera RFEF	32	3	1	0	—		33	3
San Fernando	2022–23	Primera RFEF	14	0	0	0	—		14	0
Schaffhausen	2022–23	Swiss Challenge League	9	5	0	0	—		9	5
Schaffhausen	2023–24	Swiss Challenge League	10	1	2	1	—		12	2
Schaffhausen	Total		19	6	2	1	—		21	7
Wil	2024–25	Swiss Challenge League	16	1	0	0	—		16	1
Vaduz	2024–25	Swiss Challenge League	30	1	4	3	2	0	36	4
Vaduz	2025–26	Swiss Challenge League	7	0	2	6	4	0	13	6
Vaduz	Total		37	1	6	9	6	0	49	10
Career total			143	12	11	10	6	0	160	22
