= Danilo Del Toro =

Swiss footballer (born 1997)

Personal information
- Full name: Danilo Del Toro
- Date of birth: 24 June 1997 (age 29)
- Place of birth: Schaffhausen, Switzerland
- Position: Midfielder

Team information
- Current team: FC Schaffhausen
- Number: 10

Youth career
- FC Schaffhausen
- Grasshopper Club
- FC Winterthur

Senior career*
Years	Team	Apps	(Gls)
2017–2022	FC Schaffhausen	166	(19)
2022–2024	Neuchâtel Xamax	61	(15)
2024–2025	FC Vaduz	35	(6)
2025–	FC Schaffhausen	37	(9)
- * Club domestic league appearances and goals as of 30 September 2026

Danilo Del Toro (born 24 June 1997) is a Swiss professional footballer who plays as a midfielder for Swiss Promotion League club FC Schaffhausen.

== Youth career ==
Del Toro played at the FC Schaffhausen youth team before joining Grasshopper Club and then playing for the U18 and U21 teams of FC Winterthur. In the summer of 2016 Del Toro came back to FC Schaffhausen and joined the second team before recommending himself for the first team.

=== FC Schaffhausen ===
On 21 September 2016, Del Toro joined FC Schaffhausen on a season-long loan. On 2 September 2017, Del Toro signed a permanent contract with FC Schaffhausen until 30 June 2019 On 22 October 2019 Del Toro signed a contract extension until the end of the 2021/2022 season. Del Toro has played in 81 competitive games scoring 9 and providing 17 assist at the time of the contract extension.

=== Neuchâtel Xamax ===
On 30 May 2022, Del Toro joined rivals Xamax FCS on a free transfer after FC Schaffhausen lost to FC Luzern 4-2 on aggregate in promotion playoffs to get promoted to the Swiss Super League, Del Toro scored in the first leg in a 2-2 draw. On 26 February 2023, Del Toro scored the winner in a 2-1 win against FC Vaduz. On 7 August 2023 Del Toro scored the 3rd goal in a 3-2 win against FC Aarau.

=== FC Vaduz ===
On 15 May 2024, Del Toro joined FC Vaduz on a 2 year deal on a free transfer. On 25 July 2024, Del Toro scored in a second qualifying round of the UEFA Conference League against St Patrick's Athletic in a 3-1 loss. Vaduz later lost on aggregate 5-3 knocking them out of the qualifiers. He was part of the team that won the 2025 Liechtensteiner Cup.

=== Return to FC Schaffhausen ===
In July 2025, Del Toro returned to FC Schaffhausen for the 2025–26 Promotion League season.

== Personal life ==
Born in Switzerland, Del Toro is of Italian descent and holds dual-citizenship.

== Honours ==
FC Vaduz

- Liechtenstein Football Cup: 2024–25
