= 1989–90 Liechtenstein Cup =

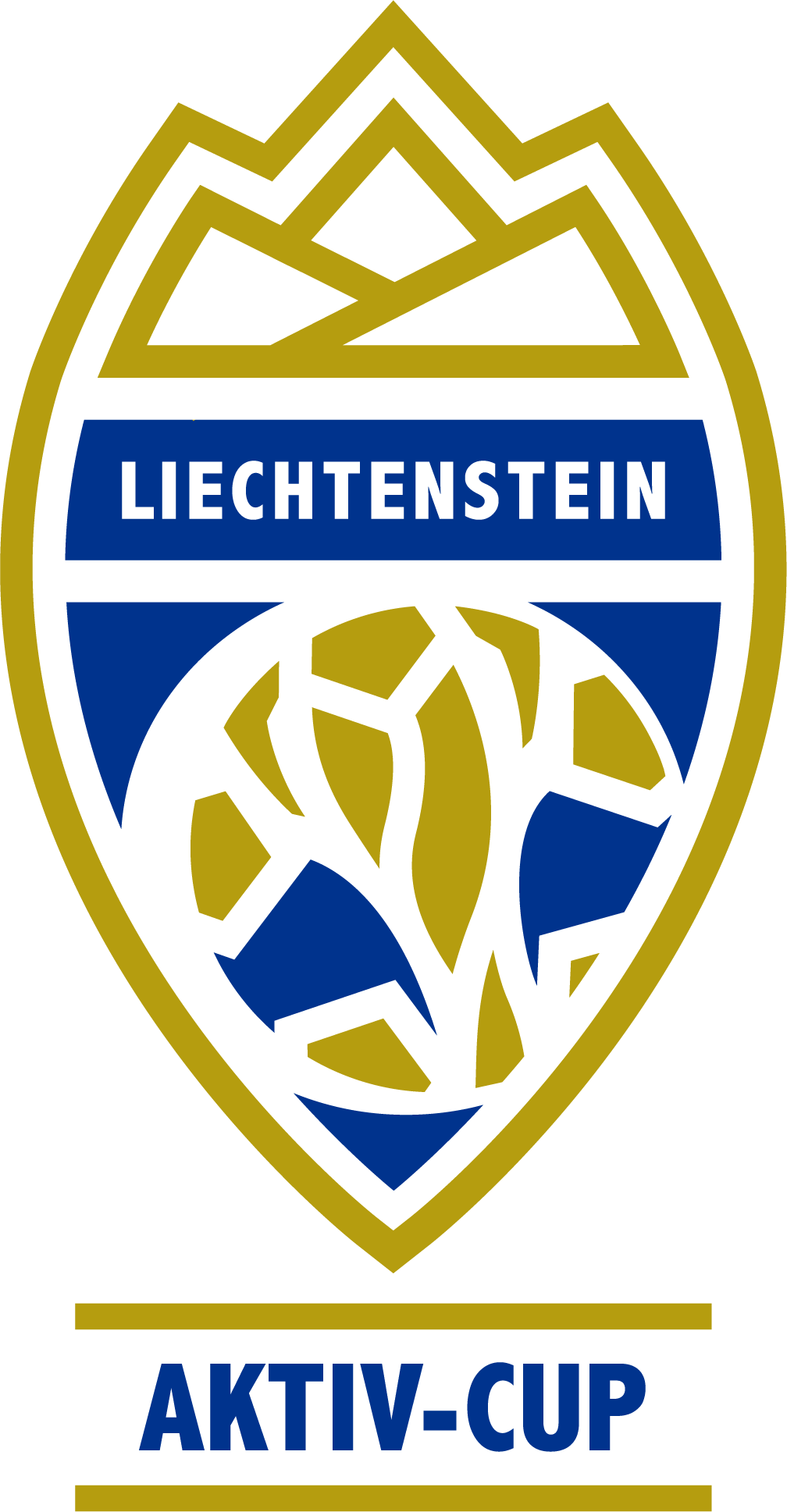
- Logo of the Cup of the Liechtenstein Football Association

Tournament details
- Country: Liechtenstein

Final positions
- Champions: FC Vaduz
- Runners-up: USV Eschen/Mauren

The 1989–90 Liechtenstein Cup was the forty-fifth season of Liechtenstein's annual cup competition. Seven clubs competed with a total of fifteen teams. FC Balzers were the defending champions, and FC Vaduz won the competition again.

== First round ==
Team 1	Score	Team 2
USV Eschen/Mauren II	2–1	FC Triesen
FC Ruggell	3–2	FC Vaduz II
FC Triesenberg	0–2	FC Vaduz
FC Schaan	1–2	USV Eschen/Mauren
FC Triesenberg II	2–3	FC Ruggell II
FC Schaan II	1–4	FC Triesen II
FC Schaan Azzurri	2–5	FC Balzers II
FC Balzers	bye	

== Quarterfinals ==
Team 1	Score	Team 2
FC Ruggell	2–5	FC Balzers
FC Balzers II	1–6	USV Eschen/Mauren
USV Eschen/Mauren II	1–4	FC Vaduz
FC Ruggell II	4–1	FC Triesen II

== Semifinals ==
Team 1	Score	Team 2
USV Eschen/Mauren	3–0	FC Balzers
FC Triesen II	1–4	FC Vaduz

== Final ==
24 May 1990

FC Vaduz	4–1	USV Eschen/Mauren

Triesen
