= 2022–23 FC Schaffhausen season =

FC Schaffhausen
2022–23 season
- Chairman: Roland Klein
- Manager: Hakan Yakin (until 12 August); Bigi Meier (interim)
- Stadium: Wefox Arena Schaffhausen
- Swiss Challenge League: 7th
- Swiss Cup: Round 3
- Top goalscorer: League: Raúl Bobadilla (6); All: Raúl Bobadilla (8)

The 2022–23 season is the 127th season in the history of FC Schaffhausen and their 9th consecutive season in the second division. The club are participating in Swiss Challenge League and the Swiss Cup. The season covers the period from 1 July 2022 to 30 June 2023.

== Players ==
As of 28 July 2022

Note: Flags indicate national team as defined under FIFA eligibility rules; some limited exceptions apply. Players may hold more than one non-FIFA nationality.

No.	Pos.	Nation	Player
1	GK	SUI	Francesco Ruberto
3	DF	SUI	Louis Lurvink
4	DF	PER	Jean-Pierre Rhyner
5	DF	SUI	Serge Müller
7	FW	BRA	Patrick Luan
8	MF	URU	Agustín González
9	MF	MKD	Amel Rustemoski
10	MF	FRA	Yassin Maouche
11	MF	GER	Robin Kalem (on loan from Grasshopper)
15	DF	ALB	Bujar Lika
20	DF	URU	Axel Müller

No.	Pos.	Nation	Player
21	MF	RUS	Vladislav Cherny (on loan from Arminia Bielefeld)
23	FW	SUI	Leonit Sahitaj
27	DF	KOS	Jetmir Krasniqi
32	FW	PAR	Raúl Bobadilla
34	DF	KOS	Valon Hamdiu
40	GK	SUI	Kilian Manera
45	MF	SUI	Luka Stevic
64	MF	SUI	Miro Soldo
77	MF	SUI	Willy Vogt
78	MF	KOS	Leonardo Uka (on loan from Grasshopper)

== Pre-season and friendlies ==
Win Draw Loss Fixtures

24 June 2022 Friendly	Grasshopper (Switzerland)	1–5	(Switzerland) Schaffhausen	Niederhasli
14:00 CEST (UTC+2)				Stadium: GC/Campus

2 July 2022 Friendly	Winterthur (Switzerland)	3–0	(Switzerland) Schaffhausen	Winterthur
11:00 CEST (UTC+2)				Stadium: Stadion Schützenwiese

9 July 2022 Friendly	Young Boys (Switzerland)	7–0	(Switzerland) Schaffhausen	Bern
14:00 CEST (UTC+2)				Stadium: Stadion Wankdorf

2 December 2022 Friendly	Grasshoppers U21 (Switzerland)	3–3	(Switzerland) Schaffhausen	Belek, Turkey
12:00 CET (UTC+1)

13 January 2023 Friendly	Universitatea Cluj (Romania)	4–2	(Switzerland) Schaffhausen
13:00 CET (UTC+1)

18 January 2023 Friendly	Grasshopper (Switzerland)	1–0	(Switzerland) Schaffhausen
14:00 CET (UTC+1)

21 January 2023 Friendly	Schaffhausen (Switzerland)	2–1	(Switzerland) Brühl
12:00 CET (UTC+1)

23 March 2023 Friendly	Karlsruher SC (Germany)	v	(Switzerland) Schaffhausen	Karlsruhe, Germany
14:00 CET (UTC+1)		Report		Stadium: Wildpark Platz 6 (Kunstrasenplatz)

== Competitions ==
=== Overall record ===
Competition	First match	Last match	Starting round	Final position	Record							
Competition	First match	Last match	Starting round	Final position	Pld	W	D	L	GF	GA	GD	Win %
Swiss Challenge League	15 July 2022	27 May 2023	Matchday 1	7th	35	11	8	16	48	57	−9	31.43
Swiss Cup	21 August 2022	8 November 2022	Round 1	Round 3	3	2	0	1	10	4	+6	66.67
Total					38	13	8	17	58	61	−3	34.21

Last updated: 23 May 2023
Source: Soccerway

=== Swiss Challenge League ===
==== League table ====
Pos	Team	Pld	W	D	L	GF	GA	GD	Pts	Promotion or qualification
5	Wil	36	16	8	12	62	52	+10	56	
6	Thun	36	12	13	11	62	55	+7	49	
7	Schaffhausen	36	12	8	16	51	59	−8	44	
8	Vaduz	36	7	16	13	54	56	−2	37	Qualification for the Europa Conference League first qualifying round (Note: Vaduz qualified for the Europa Conference League first qualifying round by winning the 2022–23 Liechtenstein Cup.)
9	Bellinzona	36	11	4	21	38	71	−33	37	

Source: Swiss Challenge League
Rules for classification: 1) Points; 2) Goal difference; 3) Goals scored; 4) Head-to-head goal difference; 5) Away goals scored; 6) Draw.

==== Results summary ====
Overall								Home						Away					
Pld	W	D	L	GF	GA	GD	Pts	W	D	L	GF	GA	GD	W	D	L	GF	GA	GD
35	11	8	16	48	57	−9	41	6	4	8	23	29	−6	5	4	8	25	28	−3

Last updated: 23 May 2023.
Source: Swiss Challenge League

==== Results by round ====
Round	1	2	3	4	5	6	7	8	9	10	11	12	13	14	15	16	17	18	19	20	21	22	23	24	25	26	27	28	29	30	31	32	33	34	35	36
Ground	H	A	H	H	A	H	A	H	A	H	A	A	H	A	H	A	A	H	A	H	A	H	A	H	H	A	H	A	H	A	A	H	H	A	H	A
Result	W	L	W	L	W	L	D	L	W	D	L	D	L	L	D	L	L	W	D	W	W	D	W	L	L	L	W	W	L	L	D	W	L	L	D	
Position																																				

Updated to match(es) played on 23 May 2023. Source: Swiss Challenge League
A = Away; H = Home; W = Win; D = Draw; L = Loss

==== Matches ====
The league fixtures were announced on 17 June 2022.

15 July 2022 1	Schaffhausen	1–0	Thun	Schaffhausen
19:30 CEST (UTC+2)				Stadium: Wefox Arena Schaffhausen

22 July 2022 2	Lausanne	5–1	Schaffhausen	Lausanne
20:15 CEST (UTC+2)				Stadium: Stade de la Tuilière

29 July 2022 3	Schaffhausen	2–0	Neuchâtel Xamax	Schaffhausen
19:30 CEST (UTC+2)				Stadium: Wefox Arena Schaffhausen; Referee: Fedayi San

14 April 2023 29	Schaffhausen	3–4	Yverdon	Schaffhausen
CEST (UTC+2)				Stadium: Wefox Arena Schaffhausen

21 April 2023 30	Wil	3–1	Schaffhausen	Wil
CEST (UTC+2)				Stadium: Sportpark Bergholz

28 April 2023 31	Lausanne	1–1	Schaffhausen	Lausanne
CEST (UTC+2)				Stadium: Stade de la Tuilière

5 May 2023 32	Schaffhausen	2–1	Bellinzona	Schaffhausen
CEST (UTC+2)				Stadium: Wefox Arena Schaffhausen

12 May 2023 33	Schaffhausen	2–4	Stade Lausanne-Ouchy	Schaffhausen
CEST (UTC+2)				Stadium: Wefox Arena Schaffhausen

19 May 2023 34	Aarau	2–0	Schaffhausen	Aarau
CEST (UTC+2)				Stadium: Stadion Brügglifeld

23 May 2023 35	Schaffhausen	1–1	Neuchâtel Xamax	Schaffhausen
CEST (UTC+2)				Stadium: Wefox Arena Schaffhausen

=== Swiss Cup ===
21 August 2022 Round 1	Ibach	v	Schaffhausen	Ibach
15:00 CEST (UTC+2)				Stadium: Gerbihof
