= 1990–91 Liechtenstein Cup =

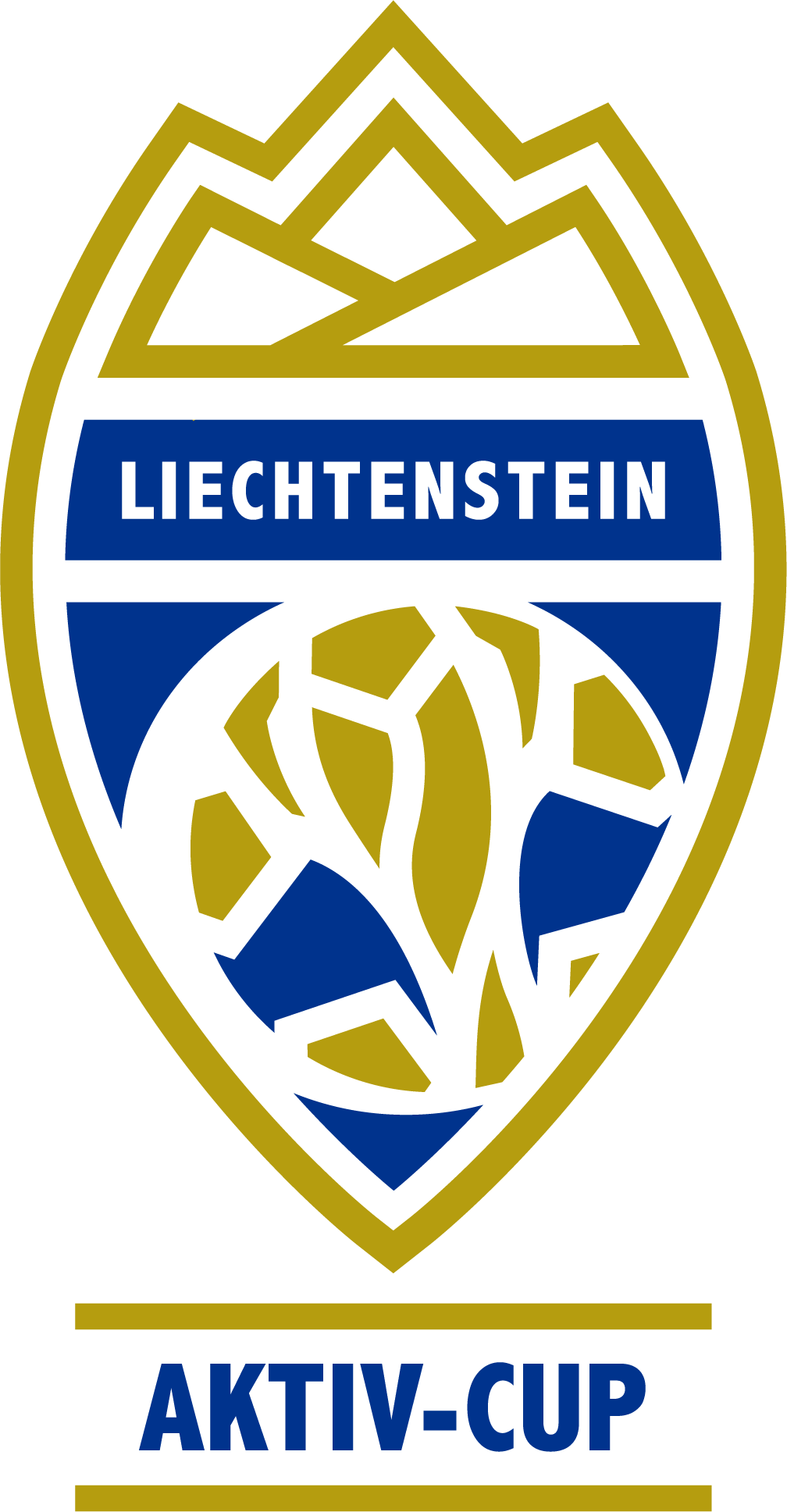
- Logo of the Cup of the Liechtenstein Football Association

Tournament details
- Country: Liechtenstein

Final positions
- Champions: FC Balzers
- Runners-up: FC Vaduz

The 1990–91 Liechtenstein Cup was the forty-sixth season of Liechtenstein's annual cup competition. Seven clubs competed with a total of sixteen teams. FC Vaduz were the defending champions, and FC Balzers won the competition.

== First round ==
Team 1	Score	Team 2
FC Vaduz II	1–2	USV Eschen/Mauren
FC Triesen II	2–5	FC Schaan
FC Schaan II	0–9	FC Balzers
USV Eschen/Mauren II	2–4	FC Triesen
FC Triesenberg II	1–7	FC Ruggell II
FC Balzers II	1–3	FC Vaduz
FC Schaan Azzurri	7–3	FC Triesenberg
FC Triesen Español	2–3	FC Ruggell

== Quarterfinals ==
Team 1	Score	Team 2
FC Schaan Azzurri	2–8	FC Balzers
FC Ruggell	0–8	USV Eschen/Mauren
FC Schaan	0–1	FC Vaduz
FC Ruggell II	0–5	FC Triesen

== Semifinals ==
Team 1	Score	Team 2
FC Triesen	1–2	FC Balzers
FC Vaduz	2–0	USV Eschen/Mauren

== Final ==
9 May 1991

FC Balzers	2–1	FC Vaduz

Triesen
