= 1988–89 Liechtenstein Cup =

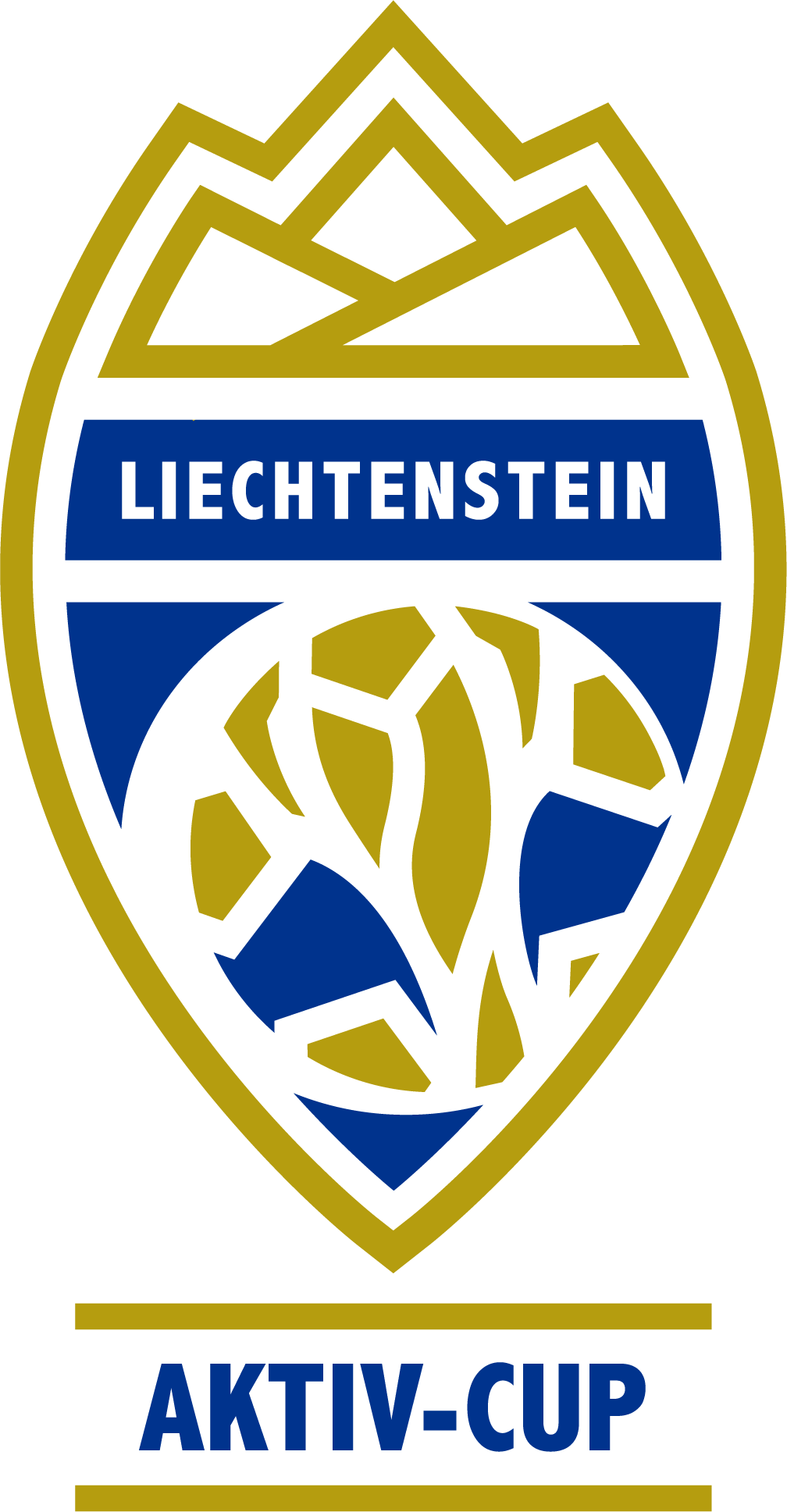
- Liechtensteiner Cup Logo

Tournament details
- Country: Liechtenstein

Final positions
- Champions: FC Balzers
- Runners-up: USV Eschen/Mauren

The 1988–89 Liechtenstein Cup was the forty-fourth season of Liechtenstein's annual cup competition. Seven clubs competed with a total of fifteen teams. FC Vaduz were the defending champions, and FC Balzers won the competition.

== First round ==
Team 1	Score	Team 2
FC Triesenberg	3–3 (a.e.t.) (7–6 p)	FC Schaan
USV Eschen/Mauren II	2–3	FC Triesen
FC Schaan II	1–6	FC Balzers
FC Ruggell II	0–6	FC Vaduz II
FC Balzers II	1–2	USV Eschen/Mauren
FC Triesenberg II	2–4	FC Triesen II
FC Schaan Azzurri	0–5	FC Ruggell
FC Vaduz	bye	

== Quarterfinals ==
Team 1	Score	Team 2
FC Triesenberg	2–3	USV Eschen/Mauren
FC Triesen	1–5	FC Balzers
FC Vaduz II	2–1	FC Ruggell
FC Triesen II	0–7	FC Vaduz

== Semifinals ==
Team 1	Score	Team 2
USV Eschen/Mauren	1–0	FC Vaduz
FC Vaduz II	1–1 (a.e.t.) (2–4 p)	FC Balzers

== Final ==
4 May 1989

FC Balzers	4–2	USV Eschen/Mauren

Triesen
