= 1991–92 Liechtenstein Cup =

Tournament details
- Country: Liechtenstein

Final positions
- Champions: FC Vaduz
- Runners-up: FC Balzers

The 1991–92 Liechtenstein Cup was the forty-seventh season of Liechtenstein's annual cup competition. Seven clubs competed with a total of sixteen teams for one spot in the qualifying round of the Cup Winners' Cup. FC Balzers were the defending champions, and FC Vaduz won the competition.

== First round ==
| Team 1 | Score | Team 2 |
|---|---|---|
| FC Triesenberg | 0–3 | FC Vaduz |
| FC Schaan II | 0–3 | FC Triesen Español |
| FC Triesen II | 0–4 | FC Schaan |
| FC Triesen | 2–3 | FC Balzers II |
| FC Triesenberg II | 2–4 | USV Eschen/Mauren II |
| FC Vaduz II | 1–2 | FC Balzers |
| FC Schaan Azzurri | 3–4 | FC Ruggell |
| FC Ruggell II | 0–5 | USV Eschen/Mauren |

== Quarterfinals ==
| Team 1 | Score | Team 2 |
|---|---|---|
| FC Triesen Español | 2–0 | USV Eschen/Mauren |
| FC Schaan | 1–3 | FC Balzers |
| USV Eschen/Mauren II | 2–1 | FC Ruggell |
| FC Balzers II | 0–1 | FC Vaduz |

== Semifinals ==
| Team 1 | Score | Team 2 |
|---|---|---|
| USV Eschen/Mauren II | 2–3 | FC Balzers |
| FC Triesen Español | 0–1 | FC Vaduz |

== Final ==
28 May 1992

| FC Vaduz | 2–1 | FC Balzers |

Triesen
