= Selcuk Sasivari =

Swiss football manager (born 1989)

Personal information
- Date of birth: 29 August 1989 (age 37)
- Place of birth: Dietikon, Switzerland
- Position: Left-back

Senior career*
Years	Team	Apps	(Gls)
- FC Dietikon
- Blue Stars Zürich
- FC Schlieren

Managerial career
- 2019–2023: Schaffhausen (assistant)
- 2023: Schaffhausen (interim)
- 2023: Schaffhausen (assistant)
- 2024–2025: Lugano (assistant)
- 2025–: Rapperswil-Jona
- * Club domestic league appearances and goals

Selcuk Sasivari (born 29 August 1989) is a Swiss-Turkish football manager who is the current head coach of FC Rapperswil-Jona in the Swiss Challenge League.

== Early life ==
Sasivari is a native of Dietikon, Switzerland.

== Playing career ==
While working as a manager, Sasivari played as a full-back for FC Schlieren.

== Managerial career ==
In 2017, Sasivari obtained the UEFA A License.

Since 2020, he's been assistant coach for Swiss Challenge League side FC Schaffhausen, where he's worked with both Martin Andermatt, Murat Yakin, and Hakan Yakin. Following Hakan Yakin's departure in May 2023, he took over as caretaker for the final two games of the season. He returned to being assistant coach under Bigi Meier afterwards.

On 3 November 2025, he was appointed as the head coach of FC Rapperswil-Jona in the Swiss Challenge League.

== Personal life ==
Sasivari has worked as a computer scientist.
