= Nicola Kollmann =

Liechtenstein footballer

Personal information
- Full name: Nicola Andreas Kollmann
- Date of birth: 23 November 1994 (age 31)
- Place of birth: Vaduz, Liechtenstein
- Height: 1.73 m (5 ft 8 in)
- Position: Midfielder

Senior career*
Years	Team	Apps	(Gls)
–2012	Ruggell		
2012–2015	Schaan	13	(0)
2015–2024	Ruggell		

International career^{‡}
2010	Liechtenstein U19	3	(0)
2013–2016	Liechtenstein U21	12	(0)
2020–2022	Liechtenstein	6	(0)
- * Club domestic league appearances and goals as of 31 May 2025 ‡ National team caps and goals as of 10 June 2022

Nicola Kollmann (born 23 November 1994) is a retired Liechtenstein footballer who played as a midfielder and was capped by the Liechtenstein national team.

== Career ==
Kollmann made his international debut for Liechtenstein on 7 October 2020 in a friendly match against Luxembourg, which finished as a 2–1 away win.

== Career statistics ==
=== International ===
As of 10 June 2022

Liechtenstein
Year	Apps	Goals
2020	1	0
2021	3	0
2022	2	0
Total	6	0
