= Adrian Ursea =

Romanian footballer and manager

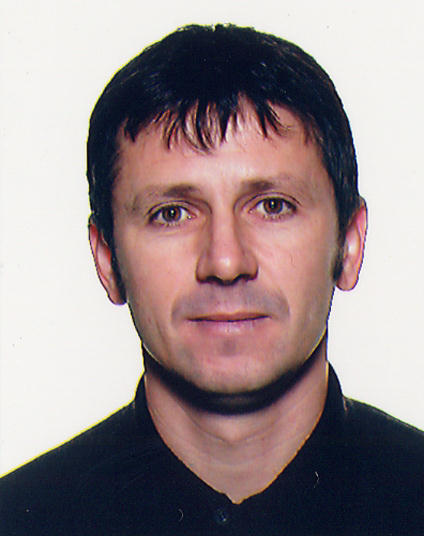

Personal information
- Full name: Adrian Dante Ursea
- Date of birth: 14 September 1967 (age 59)
- Place of birth: Slobozia, Romania
- Height: 1.72 m (5 ft 8 in)
- Position: Midfielder

Youth career
- 1982–1986: Petrolul Ploiești

Senior career*
Years	Team	Apps	(Gls)
1986–1991	Petrolul Ploiești	102	(15)
1988–1989	→ Victoria București (loan)	43	(5)
1991–1992	Locarno	13	(4)
1992–1994	Chênois	7	(2)
1994	Rapid București	4	(0)
1995	Étoile Carouge		
1995–1996	Bulle		
1996–1997	Vevey		
1997–1999	Stade Nyonnais	20	(6)
1999–2000	Fribourg		
2000–2001	Vevey		
Total		189	(32)

Managerial career
- 2000–2001: Vevey (player-coach)
- 2001–2003: Servette (assistant)
- 2003: Servette (caretaker)
- 2003–2004: Servette (assistant)
- 2004: Servette (caretaker)
- 2005: Meyrin
- 2007–2011: Neuchâtel Xamax (technical director)
- 2011–2016: Neuchâtel Xamax (academy manager)
- 2016–2018: Nice (assistant)
- 2019: Servette U21
- 2019–2020: Nice (assistant)
- 2020–2021: Nice
- 2023–2025: Étoile Carouge
- 2025–2026: Yverdon Sport
- * Club domestic league appearances and goals

Adrian Dante Ursea (born 14 September 1967) is a Romanian professional football manager and former player.

== Early life ==
Born in Slobozia, Ursea completed his schooling in Ploiești.

== Playing career ==
Ursea played 102 games for the Romanian top flight side Petrolul Ploiești, and also played for various clubs in Switzerland.

== Coaching career ==
After his retirement, Ursea went into coaching, and for four years was technical director at Swiss side Neuchâtel Xamax. On 4 December 2020, he became the manager of OGC Nice after Patrick Vieira was dismissed. He left Nice by the end of the 2020–21 season.

== Managerial statistics ==
As of 8 March 2026

Managerial record by team and tenure
Team	From	To	Record								Ref
Team	From	To	G	W	D	L	GF	GA	GD	Win %	Ref
Servette (caretaker)	21 March 2003	20 June 2003	12	4	3	5	15	23	−8	33.33	
Servette (caretaker)	17 August 2004	12 October 2004	7	4	2	1	11	7	+4	57.14	
Meyrin	1 July 2005	22 October 2005	14	1	6	7	10	22	−12	7.14	
Nice	4 December 2020	23 May 2021	30	11	5	14	37	42	−5	36.67	
Étoile Carouge	1 July 2023	30 June 2025	75	42	13	20	142	95	+47	56.00	
Yverdon-Sport	1 July 2025	present	29	18	4	7	57	35	+22	62.07	
Total			167	80	33	54	272	224	+48	47.90	—

== Honours ==
=== Coach ===
Étoile Carouge

- Swiss Promotion League: 2023–24
