= 2025–26 Liechtenstein Cup =

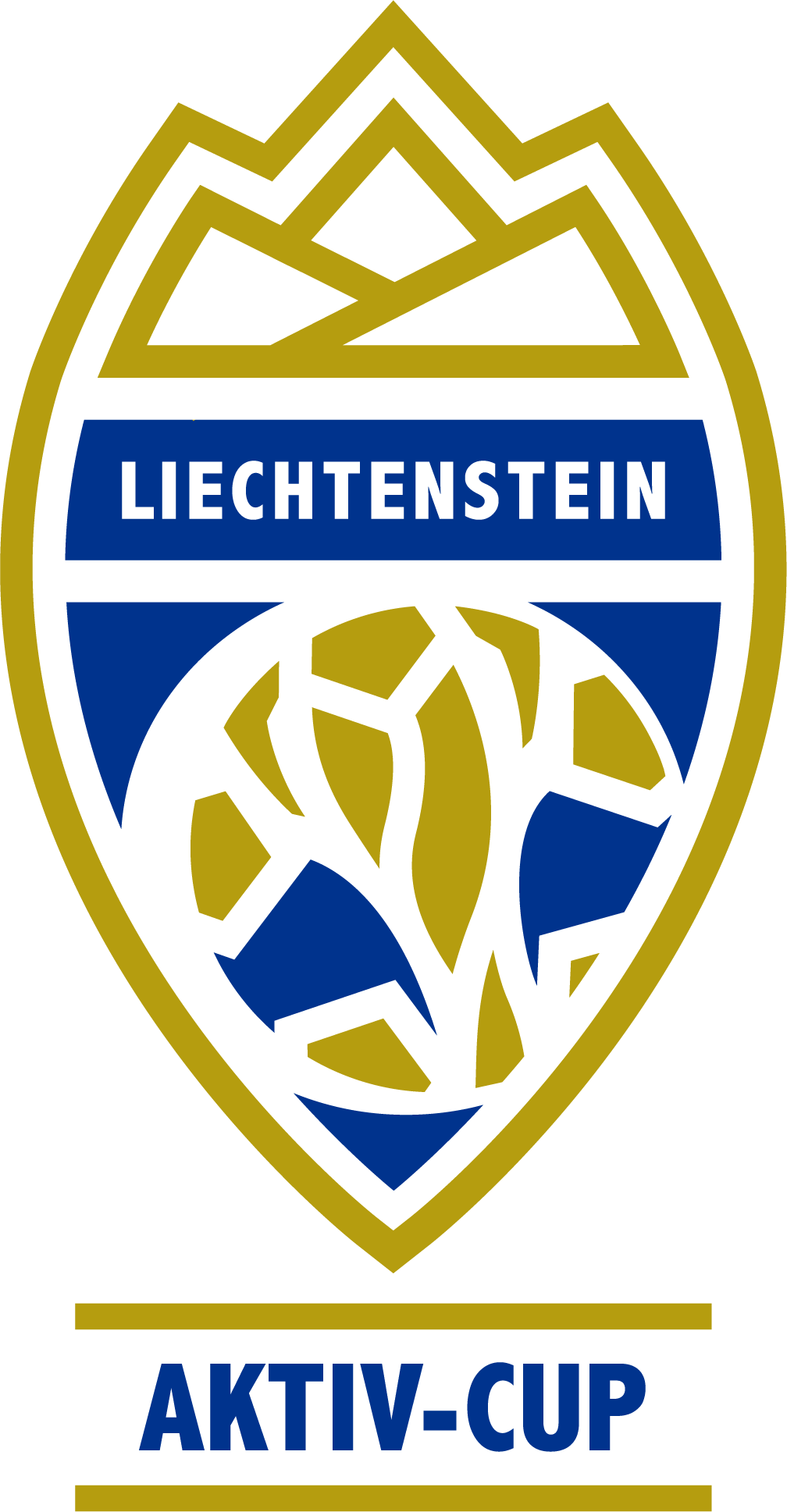

Tournament details
- Country: Liechtenstein
- Teams: 7 (and 12 reserve teams)

Final positions
- Champions: FC Vaduz
- Runners-up: USV Eschen/Mauren

Tournament statistics
- Matches played: 17
- Goals scored: 99 (5.82 per match)

The 2025–26 Liechtenstein Cup was the 81st season of Liechtenstein's annual cup competition. The winners qualified for the second qualifying round of the 2026–27 UEFA Conference League.

Vaduz successfully defended their title by beating Eschen/Mauren 4-3 in the final.

== Participating clubs ==
A total of 19 teams have registered to participate in the Liechtenstein Cup 2025/26. The lower-class team has home advantage in all cup rounds up to and including the semi-finals.

| 2024–25 Swiss Challenge League (2nd tier) | 2024–25 1. Liga (4th tier) | 2024–25 2. Liga inter (5th tier) | 2024–25 2. Liga (6th tier) | 2024–25 3. Liga (7th tier) | 2024–25 4. Liga (8th tier) | 2024–25 5. Liga (9th tier) |
| Vaduz ^{TH} | Eschen/Mauren | Balzers | Ruggell; Schaan; Vaduz II | Triesen; Triesenberg | Balzers II; Eschen/Mauren II; Eschen/Mauren III; Ruggell II; Schaan II; Vaduz III | Balzers III; Triesenberg II; Triesen II; Ruggell III A; Ruggell III B |

^{TH} Title holders.

== Pre-qualification ==
The draw was made on 8 July 2025.

The five third teams, and a randomly drawn second team, will play a preliminary qualification match. USV Eschen/Mauren II were drawn as the only second team to enter pre-qualification.

The pre-qualification matches will take place from 12 August 2025 to 14 August 2025.

| Team 1 | Score | Team 2 |
|---|---|---|
12 August 2025
| Ruggell III A (9) | 4–1 | Balzers III (9) |
13 August 2025
| Ruggell III B (9) | 1–7 | Eschen/Mauren II (8) |
14 August 2025
| Eschen/Mauren III (8) | 1–5 (a.e.t.) | Vaduz III (8) |

== Round of 16 ==
The pre-qualification winners and remaining 13 teams entered the Round of 16. Vaduz, Eschen/Mauren and Balzers 1st teams are seeded, and were unable to be drawn against each other in this round.

The draw was made by Liechtenstein women's national team player Sina Kollmann.

The round of 16 matches are scheduled to take place on 16 and 17 September 2025.

| Team 1 | Score | Team 2 |
|---|---|---|
17 September 2025
| Triesen II (9) | 0–4 | Balzers (5) |
| Triesenberg II (9) | 0–12 | Vaduz (2) |
| Balzers II (8) | 0–4 | Eschen/Mauren II (8) |
| Schaan (6) | 1–4 | Ruggell (6) |
18 September 2025
| Ruggell II (8) | 1–3 | Triesen (7) |
19 September 2025
| Ruggell III A (9) | 3–7 (a.e.t.) | Vaduz III (8) |
24 September 2025
| Schaan II (8) | 0–6 | Triesenberg (7) |
15 October 2025
| Vaduz II (6) | 0–0 (a.e.t.) (3–4 p) | Eschen/Mauren (4) |

== Quarter-finals ==
The draw was made on 25 September 2025 by Liechtenstein Under 17's coach Mathias Mayer.

The quarter finals consisted of the 8 winners from the previous round.

| Team 1 | Score | Team 2 |
|---|---|---|
29 October 2025
| Vaduz III (8) | 2–3 | Triesen (7) |
| Ruggell (6) | 0–1 | Eschen/Mauren (4) |
4 November 2025
| Triesenberg (7) | 1–5 | Vaduz (2) |
5 November 2025
| Eschen/Mauren II (8) | 1–4 | Balzers (5) |

== Semi-finals ==
The draw was made on 11 November 2025 by Liechtenstein men's national football team player Maximilian Göppel

The semi finals consisted of the 4 winners from the previous round.

| Team 1 | Score | Team 2 |
|---|---|---|
14/15 April 2026
| Balzers (5) | 2–4 | Vaduz (2) |
| Triesen (7) | 1–11 | Eschen/Mauren (4) |

== Final ==
The final consists of the two semi-final winners.

5 May 2026
20:00

| Vaduz | 4–3 | Eschen/Mauren |
|---|---|---|
| Beyer 30', 77'; Schwizer 39'; Hammerich 66' | Report | 41' Radojicic; 61' Krbanjevic; 90+2' Gjorgjievski |

Rheinpark Stadion, Vaduz
Attendance: 999
Referee: Jonathan Jaussi (Switzerland)

== Bracket ==
Pre-qualification
9 | Ruggell III A | 4
9 | Balzers III | 1
8 | Eschen/Mauren III | 1
8 | Vaduz III (a.e.t.) | 5
9 | Ruggell III B | 1
8 | Eschen/Mauren II | 7

Round of 16
9 | Ruggell III A | 3
8 | Vaduz III (a.e.t.) | 7
8 | Ruggell II | 1
7 | Triesen | 3
6 | Schaan | 1
6 | Ruggell | 4
6 | Vaduz II | 0 (3)
4 | Eschen/Mauren (p) | 0 (4)
8 | Balzers II | 0
8 | Eschen/Mauren II | 4
9 | Triesen II | 0
5 | Balzers | 4
9 | Triesenberg II | 0
2 | Vaduz | 12
8 | Schaan II | 0
7 | Triesenberg | 6

Quarter-finals
8 | Vaduz III | 2
7 | Triesen | 3
6 | Ruggell | 0
4 | Eschen/Mauren | 1
8 | Eschen/Mauren II | 1
5 | Balzers | 4
7 | Triesenberg | 1
2 | Vaduz | 5

Semi-finals
7 | Triesen | 1
4 | Eschen/Mauren | 11
5 | Balzers | 2
2 | Vaduz | 4

Final
2 | Vaduz | 4
4 | Eschen/Mauren | 3
