= Axel Müller (footballer) =

Uruguayan footballer (born 1996)

Personal information
- Full name: Hans Axel Müller Odriozola
- Date of birth: 2 October 1996 (age 30)
- Place of birth: Tacuarembó, Uruguay
- Height: 1.70 m (5 ft 7 in)
- Position: Midfielder

Team information
- Current team: Albion
- Number: 13

Youth career
- 2008–2011: Tacuarembó
- 2012–2017: Nacional
- 2015–2016: → Pescara (loan)

Senior career*
Years	Team	Apps	(Gls)
2018–2019	Nacional	0	(0)
2018	→ Racing Montevideo (loan)	11	(1)
2019	→ Montevideo Wanderers (loan)	12	(2)
2020	Cerro Largo	3	(0)
2021–2023	Schaffhausen	63	(0)
2023–	Albion	11	(0)
- * Club domestic league appearances and goals as of 14 October 2023

Hans Axel Müller Odriozola (born 2 October 1996) is a Uruguayan professional footballer who plays as a midfielder for Albion.

== Career ==
Müller is a youth academy graduate of Nacional. He spent 2015–16 season on loan at youth team of Italian club Pescara, where he scored 15 goals from 28 matches. Following his impressive performance with the youth team, Pescara senior team manager Massimo Oddo named him on bench for senior team's Serie B matches against Cesena and Spezia.

With no opportunities at Nacional, Müller was loaned out to Racing Montevideo and Montevideo Wanderers during 2018 and 2019 seasons respectively. While at Racing, he made his professional debut on 21 July 2018 in a 1–1 draw against Peñarol. He scored his first goal on 14 October 2018 in Racing's 2–1 win against Montevideo Wanderers.

Müller signed a two-year contract with Cerro Largo in January 2020. On 23 September 2020 it was reported that Müller's contract had been terminated by mutual agreement.

After getting released by Cerro Largo, Müller started to train with Swiss Challenge League club Schaffhausen in October 2020. In January 2021, he signed a contract with the club until June 2022.

== Personal life ==
Müller also holds a German passport. He is passionate about Paddle tennis and has represented his country in a youth tournament held in Morocco. He has a twin sister named Ingrid.
