= Mischa Beeli =

Swiss footballer (born 2004)

Personal information
- Date of birth: 5 February 2004 (age 22)
- Place of birth: Chur, Switzerland
- Height: 1.82 m (6 ft 0 in)
- Position: Defender

Team information
- Current team: Vaduz
- Number: 14

Youth career
- 2019-2024: St. Gallen

Senior career*
Years	Team	Apps	(Gls)
2021–2024	St. Gallen II	85	(0)
2024–	Vaduz	53	(0)

International career^{‡}
2019	Switzerland U15	2	(0)
2019	Switzerland U16	2	(0)
2021–2022	Switzerland U18	5	(0)
2022	Switzerland U19	8	(0)
2024	Switzerland U20	5	(0)
2025	Switzerland U21	1	(0)
- * Club domestic league appearances and goals as of 28 September 2026 ‡ National team caps and goals as of 24 March 2025

Mischa Andrea Beeli (born 5 February 2004) is a Swiss professional footballer who plays as a defender for Liechtensteiner Swiss Super League club Vaduz.

== Career ==
Beeli was on the Swiss U15, U16, U18, U19, U20, and U21 national teams.

=== Vaduz ===
On 28 May 2024, Beeli Signed a 2 year contract until 2026 with FC Vaduz from FC St. Gallen.
