= Sandro Wieser =

Liechtensteiner professional footballer (born 1993)

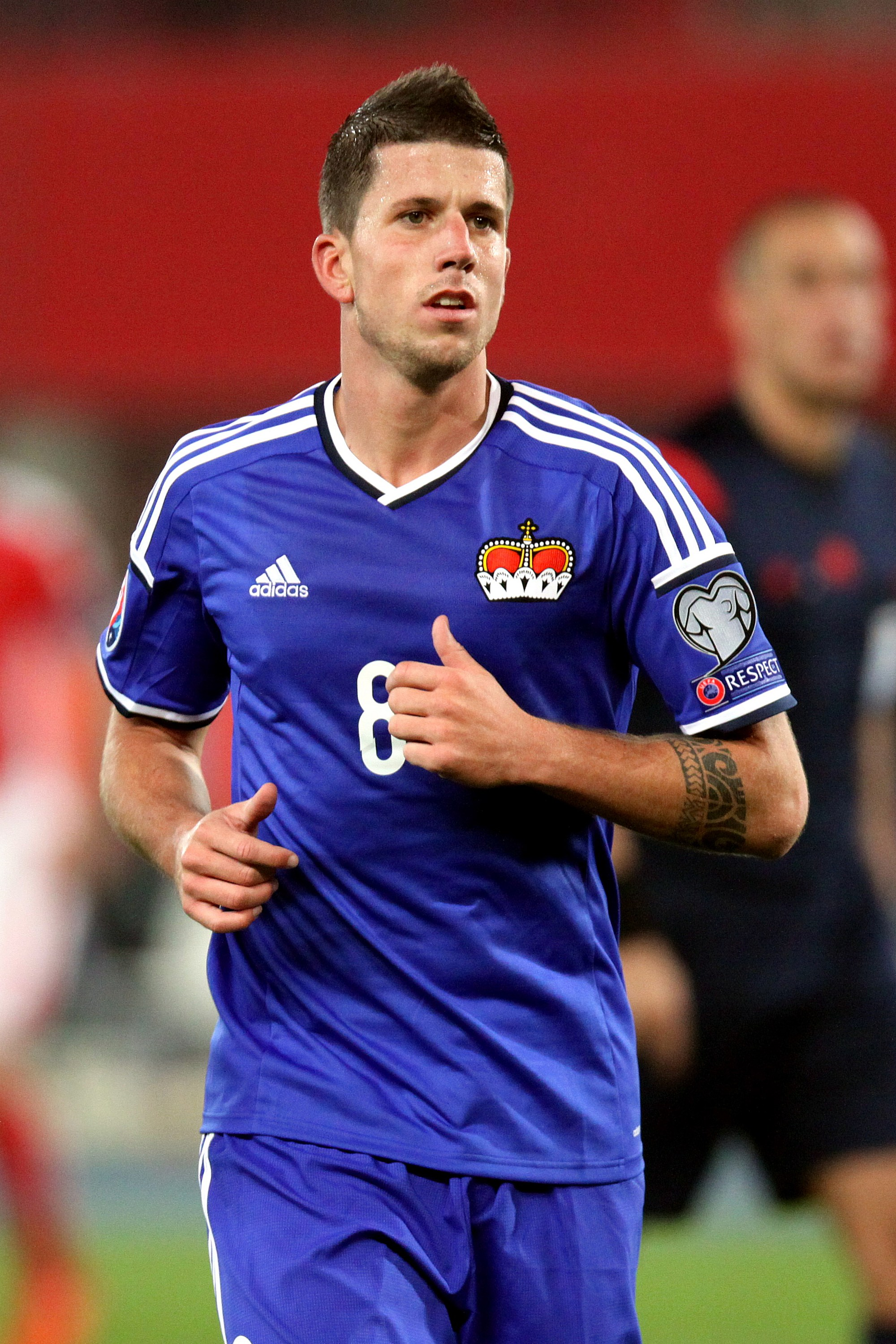
- Wieser with Liechtenstein in 2015

Personal information
- Full name: Sandro Wieser
- Date of birth: 3 February 1993 (age 33)
- Place of birth: Vaduz, Liechtenstein
- Height: 1.87 m (6 ft 2 in)
- Position: Midfielder

Team information
- Current team: Ruggell
- Number: 33

Youth career
- 2001–2003: FC Triesen
- 2003–2006: Vaduz
- 2006–2009: Basel

Senior career*
Years	Team	Apps	(Gls)
2009–2011	Basel U-21	29	(4)
2011–2012	Basel	2	(0)
2012–2013	1899 Hoffenheim II	18	(0)
2012–2015	1899 Hoffenheim	1	(0)
2013–2014	→ SV Ried (loan)	11	(0)
2014–2015	→ FC Aarau (loan)	14	(2)
2015–2016	FC Thun	23	(2)
2016–2018	Reading	0	(0)
2017–2018	→ Roeselare (loan)	10	(1)
2018–2025	Vaduz	120	(6)
2025–2026	Tuggen	13	(2)
2026–	Ruggell		

International career^{‡}
2009–2014	Liechtenstein U-21	6	(0)
2010–	Liechtenstein	69	(2)
- * Club domestic league appearances and goals as of 6 June 2026 ‡ National team caps and goals as of 6 June 2025

Sandro Wieser (born 3 February 1993) is a Liechtensteiner professional footballer who plays as a midfielder for Ruggell and the Liechtenstein national team.

== Club career ==
=== Early career ===
Born in Vaduz, Wieser began his youth career with FC Triesen and moved onto FC Vaduz. In 2006, he continued his youth career with FC Basel playing in the U-16, U-18 and U-21 teams. He signed his first professional contract on his 18th birthday. He played his debut on 20 March 2011 in the 2–1 away win against Grasshopper Club Zürich. At the end of the 2010–11 Swiss Super League season Sandro Wieser won the Super League Championship title with FC Basel.

Because Wieser was born in 1993, he was eligible to play for the newly formed Basel Under-19 team in the 2011–12 NextGen series. He played in his first game against Tottenham Hotspur on 17 August 2011.

On 27 December, Basel announced that Wieser would transfer to German club TSG 1899 Hoffenheim in the January 2012 transfer window. Wieser however didn't manage to earn a spot in Hoffenheim's first squad, being capped in the Bundesliga only once in 18 months. As a result of this, he was put on loan, first in summer 2013 to Austrian side SV Ried and then in next summer to Swiss FC Aarau, each time the loan was terminated to a year.

=== Foul on Yapi Yapo ===
FC Zürich launched legal proceedings against Wieser after the 21-year-old committed a knee-high challenge on Gilles Yapi Yapo in a match on 9 November 2014, leaving the former Ivory Coast international's career in serious doubt. Yapi Yapo suffered torn anterior and cruciate ligaments, a torn meniscus, a torn kneecap tendon, serious cartilage damage and deep bruising to his thigh after the incident. Wieser was shown a straight red card for the tackle, and was later suspended for six matches by the Swiss league. With Yapi Yapo highly unlikely to ever play again, club president Ancillo Canepa launched legal proceedings against Wieser.

=== Reading ===
On 18 August 2016, Wieser signed a three-year contract with English Championship side Reading.

On 31 August 2017, transfer deadline day, Wieser joined K.S.V. Roeselare on a season-long loan deal.

On 1 June 2018, Wieser was released a year early from his Reading contract by mutual consent.

=== FC Vaduz return ===
On 12 June 2018, Wieser signed a three-year contract with FC Vaduz. On 22 July 2018 he scored his first goal for the club in Vaduz's first match of the 2018–19 Swiss Challenge League, a 3–1 victory over FC Chiasso.

=== FC Tuggen ===
On 19 May 2025, Wieser joined Swiss fourth tier club FC Tuggen, retiring as a professional footballer as he joined the amateur club.

== International career ==
Wieser received his first call-up to the senior team in 2009, and made his debut against Iceland on 11 August 2010.

== Career statistics ==
=== Club ===
As of 17 November 2025

Appearances and goals by club, season and competition
Club	Season	League			National Cup		League Cup		Continental		Other		Total	
Club	Season	Division	Apps	Goals	Apps	Goals	Apps	Goals	Apps	Goals	Apps	Goals	Apps	Goals
Basel	2010–11	Swiss Super League	2	0	0	0	—		—		—		2	0
Basel	2011–12	Swiss Super League	0	0	0	0	—		—		—		0	0
Basel	Total		2	0	0	0	—		—		—		2	0
1899 Hoffenheim	2011–12	Bundesliga	1	0	0	0	—		—		—		1	0
1899 Hoffenheim	2012–13	Bundesliga	0	0	0	0	—		—		0	0	0	0
1899 Hoffenheim	2013–14	Bundesliga	0	0	0	0	—		—		—		0	0
1899 Hoffenheim	2014–15	Bundesliga	0	0	0	0	—		—		—		0	0
1899 Hoffenheim	Total		1	0	0	0	—		—		0	0	1	0
SV Ried (loan)	2013–14	Austrian Bundesliga	11	0	3	0	—		—		—		14	0
Aarau (loan)	2014–15	Swiss Super League	14	2	1	1	—		—		—		15	3
Thun	2015–16	Swiss Super League	23	2	2	1	—		2	0	—		27	2
Reading	2016–17	Championship	0	0	0	0	0	0	—		0	0	0	0
Reading	2017–18	Championship	0	0	0	0	0	0	—		—		0	0
Reading	Total		0	0	0	0	0	0	—		0	0	0	0
Roeselare (loan)	2017–18	Belgian First Division B	10	1	1	0	—		—		—		11	1
Vaduz	2018–19	Swiss Challenge League	29	3	3	1	—		4	0	—		36	4
Vaduz	2019–20	Swiss Challenge League	17	0	0	0	—		5	0	2	0	24	0
Vaduz	2020–21	Swiss Super League	16	0	0	0	—		1	0	—		17	0
Vaduz	2021–22	Swiss Challenge League	0	0	0	0	—		—		—			
Vaduz	2022–23	Swiss Challenge League	6	0	0	0	—		—		—		6	0
Vaduz	2023–24	Swiss Challenge League	27	3	0	0	—		2	0	—		29	3
Vaduz	2024–25	Swiss Challenge League	25	0	0	0	—		1	0	—		26	0
Vaduz	Total		120	6	3	1	—		13	0	2	0	138	7
Career total			181	11	10	3	0	0	15	0	2	0	208	13

=== International ===
Liechtenstein national team
Year	Apps	Goals
2010	5	0
2011	5	0
2012	4	0
2013	7	0
2014	4	0
2015	6	1
2016	7	0
2017	3	0
2018	7	1
2019	5	0
2023	8	0
2024	5	0
2025	3	0
Total	69	2

Statistics accurate as of match played 6 June 2025

=== International goals ===
Scores and results list Liechtenstein's goal tally first.

#	Date	Venue	Opponent	Score	Result	Competition
1.	14 June 2015	Rheinpark Stadion, Vaduz, Liechtenstein	Moldova	1–0	1–1	UEFA Euro 2016 qualification
2.	9 September 2018	Rheinpark Stadion, Vaduz, Liechtenstein	Gibraltar	2–0	2–0	2018–19 UEFA Nations League D

== Honours ==
Basel

- Swiss champion at U-16 level: 2007–08
- Swiss Cup winner at U-16 level: 2007–08
- Swiss champion at U-18 level: 2009–10
- Swiss Super League champion: 2011
