= 2024–25 Liechtenstein Cup =

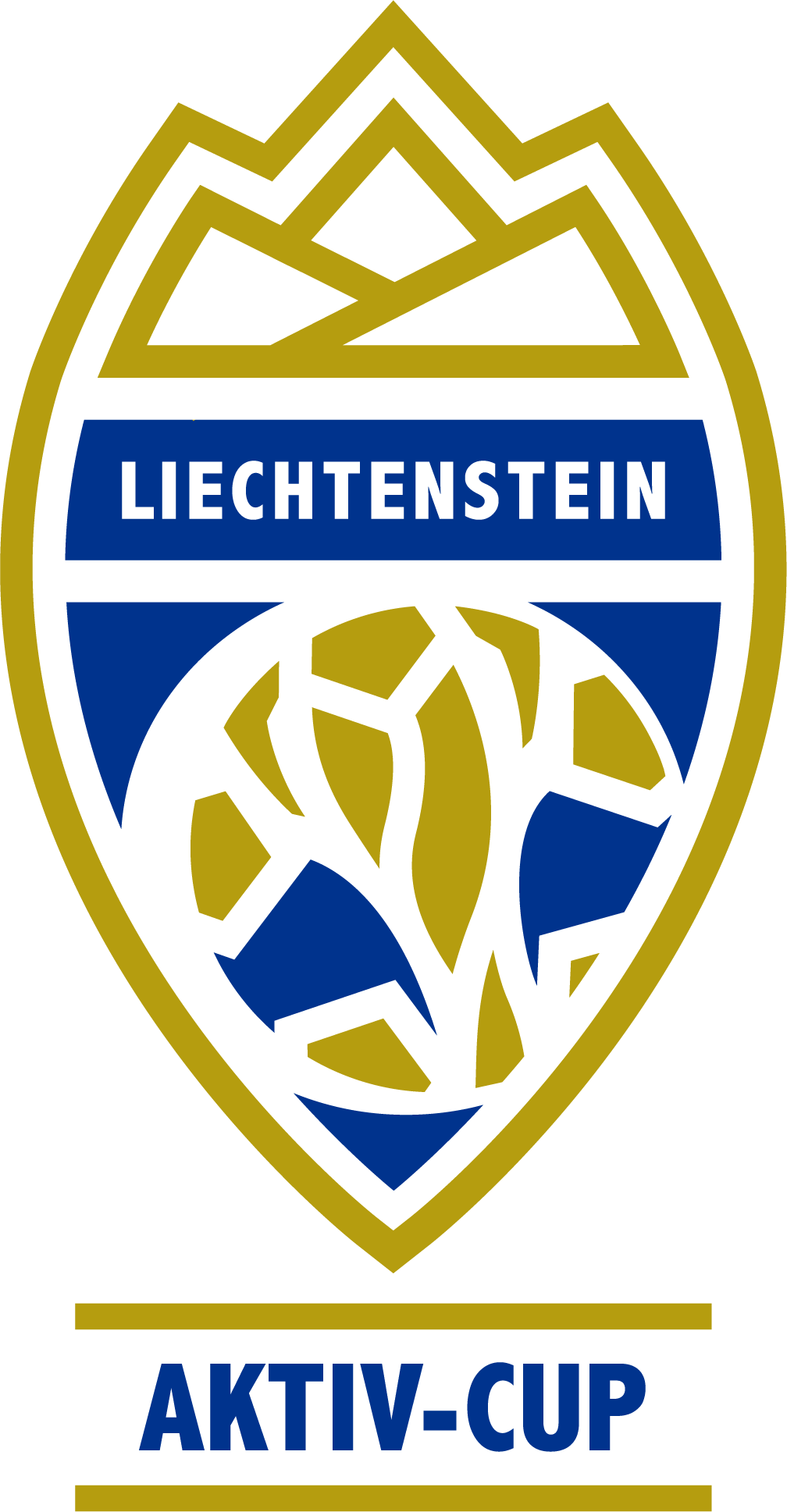

Tournament details
- Country: Liechtenstein
- Teams: 7 (and 10 reserve teams)

Final positions
- Champions: Vaduz (51st title)
- Runners-up: Balzers

The 2024–25 Liechtenstein Cup was the 80th season of Liechtenstein's annual cup competition. The winners qualified for the second qualifying round of the 2025–26 UEFA Conference League.

Vaduz won the cup (their eleventh consecutive Liechtenstein Cup win and fifty-first overall), defeating Balzers 3–2 in the final.

== Participating clubs ==
A total of 17 teams registered to participate in the Liechtenstein Cup 2024/25. The lower-class team has home advantage in all cup rounds up to and including the semi-finals.

2024–25 Swiss Challenge League (2nd tier)	2024–25 1. Liga (4th tier)	2024–25 2. Liga inter (5th tier)	2024–25 2. Liga (6th tier)	2024–25 3. Liga (7th tier)	2024–25 4. Liga (8th tier)	2024–25 5. Liga (9th tier)
Vaduz ^{TH}	Eschen/Mauren	Balzers	Ruggell; Schaan; Vaduz II	Triesen; Triesenberg	Balzers II; Eschen/Mauren II; Eschen/Mauren III; Ruggell II; Schaan II; Triesen II; Vaduz III	Balzers III; Triesenberg II

^{TH} Title holders.

== Pre-qualification ==
The draw was made on 10 July 2024 by two players from Liechtenstein's women's national team, Katharina Risch and Bettina Huber.

The three third teams entered in a preliminary qualification round. USV Eschen/Mauren III received a bye to the round of 16 by drawing lots, meaning that FC Balzers III and FC Vaduz III played each other to determine the last round of 16 team.

Team 1	Score	Team 2
14 August 2024
Balzers III (9)	2–6	Vaduz III (8)

== Round of 16 ==
The pre-qualification winners with USV Eschen/Mauren III, which received a bye, and remaining 14 teams entered the Round of 16. The draw was made on the same day as a pre-qualification draw by the Katharina Risch and Bettina Huber.

Team 1	Score	Team 2
4 September 2024
Ruggell II (8)	2–1	Schaan (6)
10 September 2024
Vaduz III (8)	0–8	Ruggell (6)
17 September 2024
Triesen (7)	0–13	Vaduz (2)
Eschen/Mauren II (8)	3–0	Schaan II (8)
Balzers II (8)	0–5	Vaduz II (6)
Triesenberg II (9)	3–2	Triesen II (8)
18 September 2024
Triesenberg (7)	0–4	Eschen/Mauren (4)
Eschen/Mauren III (8)	1–6	Balzers (5)

== Quarter-finals ==
The draw was made on 19 September 2024 by the former Liechtenstein national football team player Daniel Hasler.

The quarter finals consisted of the 8 winners from the previous round.

Team 1	Score	Team 2
16 October 2024
Triesenberg II (9)	0–10	Vaduz (2)
29 October 2024
Ruggell II (8)	3–1	Eschen/Mauren II (8)
30 October 2024
Vaduz II (6)	1–2 (a.e.t.)	Eschen/Mauren (4)
Ruggell (6)	1–3 (a.e.t.)	Balzers (5)

== Semi-finals ==
The draw was made on 4 November 2024 by the Liechtensteiner sport journalist Ernst Hasler.

The semi finals consisted of the 4 winners from the previous round.

Team 1	Score	Team 2
9 April 2025
Ruggell II (8)	0–15	Balzers (5)
23 April 2025
Eschen/Mauren (4)	3–7	Vaduz (2)

== Final ==
The final consisted of the two semi-final winners.

20 May 2025
19:00

Balzers	2–3	Vaduz
Murati 15'; Forrer 49'		Cavegn 65', 79' (pen.); Navarro 75'

Rheinpark Stadion, Vaduz
Attendance: 1,185
Referee: Hüseyin Sanli (Switzerland)
