= Luka Slišković =

Swiss footballer (born 1995)

Personal information
- Date of birth: 4 April 1995 (age 31)
- Place of birth: Zofingen, Switzerland
- Height: 1.80 m (5 ft 11 in)
- Position: Forward

Team information
- Current team: Kriens
- Number: 9

Youth career
- 2002–2008: FC Sursee
- 2008–2010: Kriens
- 2011: Luzern
- 2011–2012: Kriens
- 2012–2013: Luzern

Senior career*
Years	Team	Apps	(Gls)
2013–2016	Luzern II	44	(28)
2016–2017	Luzern	0	(0)
2016	→ Biel-Bienne (loan)	10	(2)
2016–2017	→ Winterthur (loan)	26	(5)
2017	→ Winterthur II (loan)	4	(0)
2017–2020	Winterthur	99	(31)
2017	Winterthur II	1	(1)
2020–2022	1. FC Magdeburg	20	(0)
2022	1. FC Magdeburg II	2	(1)
2022–2023	Schaffhausen	18	(0)
2024–	Kriens	68	(28)

International career^{‡}
2014	Switzerland U20	2	(0)
- * Club domestic league appearances and goals as of 28 September 2026 ‡ National team caps and goals as of 18:05, 14 September 2020 (UTC)

Luka Slišković (born 4 April 1995) is a Swiss professional footballer who plays as a forward for Kriens.

== Career ==
Slišković made his professional debut for 1. FC Magdeburg in the first round of the 2020–21 DFB-Pokal, starting against Darmstadt 98 before being substituted out in the 67th minute for Sirlord Conteh. The match finished as a 3–2 loss after extra time. On 31 August 2022, his contract with Magdeburg was dissolved.

On 2 September 2022, Slišković returned to Switzerland and signed with Schaffhausen.

On 5 February 2024, Slišković returned to Kriens.
