= Liechtenstein Football Cup =

National men's association football cup in Liechtenstein

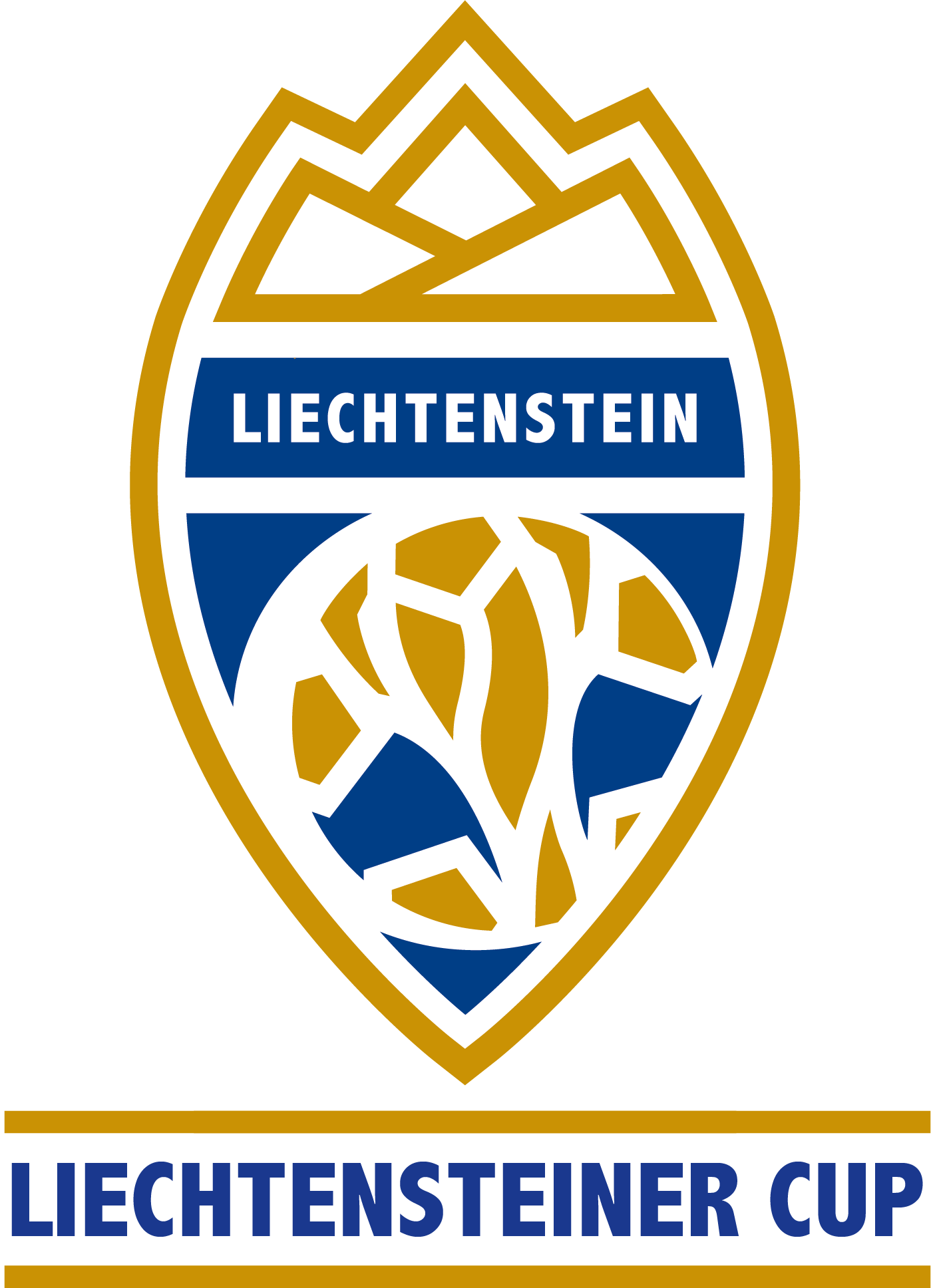
- Founded: 1945
- Region: Liechtenstein
- Teams: 7 (and 10 reserve teams)
- Qualifier for: UEFA Conference League
- Current champions: FC Vaduz (52nd title)
- Most championships: FC Vaduz (52 titles)
- Website: lfv.li/aktiv-cup
- 2025–26 Liechtenstein Cup

The Liechtenstein Football Cup is Liechtenstein's premier football competition, and has been organised annually by the Liechtenstein Football Association (LFV) since 1946. The winner qualifies to take part in the UEFA Conference League.

As there is no national league in Liechtenstein, the Liechtenstein Football Cup is the only national football competition in the country. The country has only seven clubs, all of which historically have already established themselves in the Swiss league competitions. The national cup competition is currently the only route for Liechtenstein to be represented at the European football club competitions, since Liechtensteiner clubs are prevented from qualifying for European competition via the Swiss league system.

== Competition format ==
The competition has an unusual format in that not only can the first teams of the main seven football clubs enter, but also the reserve sides, which all play in lower divisions in the Swiss league system. This can lead to some unusual scenarios, such as in the second round of the 2006–07 cup, where FC Triesenberg's second team went through, but the first team was knocked out.

Teams from the same football club can be drawn together from the semi-finals onwards. In the 2009–10 competition semi-final stage, USV Eschen/Mauren were drawn with USV Eschen/Mauren II, and again in 2022-23 semi-finals, where FC Balzers were drawn with FC Balzers II.

The top 3 clubs based on league position can only meet from the quarter-finals onwards. A qualifying round also takes place if more than 16 teams enter, and a draw is made to determine which of the third-teams are required to participate in this round.

== List of winners ==
FC Vaduz have won the competition on 51 occasions, which is a domestic football cup world record.

Season	Winner	Final score	Runner-up
1945–46	FC Triesen	3–1	FC Vaduz
1946–47	FC Triesen	2–0	FC Vaduz
1947–48	FC Triesen	4–2	FC Vaduz
1948–49	FC Vaduz	2–1	FC Triesen
1949–50	FC Triesen	3–2	FC Vaduz
1950–51	FC Triesen	3–1	FC Vaduz
1951–52	FC Vaduz	2–0	FC Triesen
1952–53	FC Vaduz	4–2	FC Triesen
1953–54	FC Vaduz	1–0	FC Triesen
1954–55	FC Schaan	1–0	FC Vaduz
1955–56	FC Vaduz	4–1	FC Schaan
1956–57	FC Vaduz	4–0	FC Schaan
1957–58	FC Vaduz	2–0	FC Triesen
1958–59	FC Vaduz	3–0	FC Triesen
1959–60	FC Vaduz	3–2	FC Schaan
1960–61	FC Vaduz	3–0	FC Schaan
1961–62	FC Vaduz	4–0	FC Schaan
1962–63	FC Schaan	3–1	FC Ruggell
1963–64	FC Balzers	1–0	FC Triesen
1964–65	FC Triesen	4–3	FC Schaan
1965–66	FC Vaduz	7–0	FC Schaan
1966–67	FC Vaduz	2–1	FC Triesen
1967–68	FC Vaduz	4–2	FC Triesen
1968–69	FC Vaduz	1–0	FC Triesen
1969–70	FC Vaduz	2–1	FC Schaan
1970–71	FC Vaduz	4–2	FC Schaan
1971–72	FC Triesen	2–1	FC Vaduz
1972–73	FC Balzers	2–1	FC Ruggell
1973–74	FC Vaduz	2–2 (4–3 PSO)	FC Balzers
1974–75	FC Triesen	5–2	FC Balzers
1975–76	USV Eschen/Mauren	3–1	FC Balzers
1976–77	USV Eschen/Mauren	0–0 (4–2 PSO)	FC Vaduz
1977–78	USV Eschen/Mauren	3–1	FC Ruggell
1978–79	FC Balzers	3–1	USV Eschen/Mauren
1979–80	FC Vaduz	1–1 (4–2 PSO)	FC Balzers
1980–81	FC Balzers	3–0	FC Ruggell
1981–82	FC Balzers	5–0	USV Eschen/Mauren
1982–83	FC Balzers	1–1 (5–3 PSO)	USV Eschen/Mauren
1983–84	FC Balzers	2–0	FC Vaduz
1984–85	FC Vaduz	3–1	USV Eschen/Mauren
1985–86	FC Vaduz	2–0	FC Balzers

Season	Winner	Final score	Runner-up
1986–87	USV Eschen/Mauren	1–0	FC Vaduz
1987–88	FC Vaduz	2–0	USV Eschen/Mauren
1988–89	FC Balzers	4–2	USV Eschen/Mauren
1989–90	FC Vaduz	4–1	USV Eschen/Mauren
1990–91	FC Balzers	2–1	FC Vaduz
1991–92	FC Vaduz	2–1	FC Balzers
1992–93	FC Balzers	5–2	FC Schaan
1993–94	FC Schaan	3–0	FC Balzers
1994–95	FC Vaduz	3–1	USV Eschen/Mauren
1995–96	FC Vaduz	1–0	USV Eschen/Mauren
1996–97	FC Balzers	3–2	FC Vaduz
1997–98	FC Vaduz	5–1	USV Eschen/Mauren
1998–99	FC Vaduz	3–2	FC Balzers
1999–00	FC Vaduz	6–0	FC Balzers
2000–01	FC Vaduz	9–0	FC Ruggell
2001–02	FC Vaduz	6–1	USV Eschen/Mauren
2002–03	FC Vaduz	6–0	FC Balzers
2003–04	FC Vaduz	5–0	FC Balzers
2004–05	FC Vaduz	4–1	USV Eschen/Mauren
2005–06	FC Vaduz	4–2	FC Balzers
2006–07	FC Vaduz	8–0	FC Ruggell
2007–08	FC Vaduz	4–0	FC Balzers
2008–09	FC Vaduz	2–1	USV Eschen/Mauren
2009–10	FC Vaduz	1–1 (4–2 PSO)	USV Eschen/Mauren
2010–11	FC Vaduz	5–0	USV Eschen/Mauren
2011–12	USV Eschen/Mauren	2–2 (4–2 PSO)	FC Vaduz
2012–13	FC Vaduz	1–1 (3–0 PSO)	FC Balzers
2013–14	FC Vaduz	6–0	USV Eschen/Mauren
2014–15	FC Vaduz	5–0	FC Triesenberg
2015–16	FC Vaduz	11–0	FC Schaan
2016–17	FC Vaduz	5–1	USV Eschen/Mauren
2017–18	FC Vaduz	3–0	FC Balzers
2018–19	FC Vaduz	3–2	FC Ruggell
2019–20	Abandoned due to COVID-19 pandemic		
2020–21	Abandoned due to COVID-19 pandemic		
2021–22	FC Vaduz	3–1	USV Eschen/Mauren
2022–23	FC Vaduz	4–0	FC Balzers
2023–24	FC Vaduz	5–0	FC Triesenberg
2024–25	FC Vaduz	3–2	FC Balzers
2025–26	FC Vaduz	4–3	USV Eschen/Mauren

== Records ==
A list of all Liechtenstein clubs reflecting their success in the Liechtenstein Cup after 76 competitions (from 1946 to 2023, exclude 2019–2021).

"League Tier" indicates in which tier of the Swiss Football League the clubs are active (status: season 2023–24).

Club	League Tier	Finals	Won	Lost
FC Vaduz	1	65	52	13
FC Balzers	4	28	11	17
FC Triesen	7	18	8	10
USV Eschen/Mauren	4	24	5	19
FC Schaan	8	14	3	11
FC Ruggell	6	7	–	7
FC Triesenberg	7	2	–	2
