= 2006–07 Toto Cup Al =

Tournament details
- Country: Israel
- Teams: 12

Final positions
- Champions: Maccabi Herzliya (1st title)
- Runners-up: Hapoel Kfar Saba

Tournament statistics
- Matches played: 63
- Goals scored: 151 (2.4 per match)
- Top goal scorer: (Brazil) José Filho Duarte (7)

The 2006–07 Toto Cup Al was the third edition under the current Toto Cup format. The final was played at Ramat Gan Stadium, Ramat Gan, on April 17, 2007.

The winners were Maccabi Herzliya, beating Hapoel Kfar Saba in the final 2–1 thanks to a goal in the game extra time by Omer Buchsenbaum.

== Group stage ==
The matches were played from August 5, 2006 to February 28, 2007.

=== Group A ===
Pos	Team	Pld	W	D	L	GF	GA	GD	Pts	MHE	HAR	HPT	MHA	MTA	MNE
1	Maccabi Herzliya (A)	10	4	4	2	16	11	+5	16		2–2	3–1	1–2	0–2	3–0
2	Hakoah Amidar Ramat Gan (A)	10	4	4	2	12	8	+4	16	0–1		4–1	1–1	1–0	0–2
3	Hapoel Petah Tikva	10	4	2	4	11	16	−5	14	0–2	1–1		2–2	1–0	2–0
4	Maccabi Haifa	10	2	7	1	11	8	+3	13	0–0	0–1	3–0		1–1	0–0
5	Maccabi Tel Aviv	10	2	4	4	12	12	0	10	3–3	0–2	0–1	1–1		0–0
6	Maccabi Netanya	10	1	5	4	7	14	−7	8	1–1	0–0	1–2	1–1	3–5	

Source: football.org.il (in Hebrew)
Rules for classification: 1st points; 2nd goal difference; 3rd matches won; 4th goals scored; 5th head-to-head; 6th decision match
(A) Advanced to the Semifinals

=== Group B ===
Pos	Team	Pld	W	D	L	GF	GA	GD	Pts	HKS	BEI	HTA	ASH	BnY	MPT
1	Hapoel Kfar Saba (A)	10	7	1	2	23	15	+8	22		1–2	3–1	2–1	4–2	1–0
2	Beitar Jerusalem (A)	10	6	2	2	16	9	+7	20	2–0		0–0	3–2	1–2	3–0
3	Hapoel Tel Aviv	10	3	5	2	7	6	+1	14	1–2	2–1		0–0	0–0	0–0
4	F.C. Ashdod	10	3	3	4	14	12	+2	12	2–4	0–1	0–0		4–1	1–0
5	Bnei Yehuda	10	1	5	4	11	18	−7	8	3–3	2–2	0–2	1–1		0–1
6	Maccabi Petah Tikva	10	1	2	7	2	13	−11	5	1–3	0–1	0–1	0–3	0–0	

Source: football.org.il (in Hebrew)
Rules for classification: 1st points; 2nd goal difference; 3rd matches won; 4th goals scored; 5th head-to-head; 6th decision match
(A) Advanced to the Semifinals

=== Semifinals ===
March 13, 2007
17:00

Maccabi Herzliya	2 – 0	Hakoah Ramat Gan
Aharoni 31'; Buchsenbaum 90'	Report

Haberfeld Stadium, Rishon LeZion
Referee: Wachsberger

March 14, 2007
17:00

Beitar Jerusalem	0 – 3	Hapoel Kfar Saba
	Report	Duarte 8', 21', 38' (pen.)

Herzliya Municipal Stadium, Herzliya
Referee: Prost

=== Final ===
April 17, 2007
19:45

Maccabi Herzliya	2 – 1 (a.e.t.)	Hapoel Kfar Saba
Radi 58'; Buchsenbaum 115'	Report	Yeboah 82'

Ramat Gan Stadium, Ramat Gan
Referee: Hachmon

== See also ==
- Toto Cup
- 2006–07 Israeli Premier League
- 2006–07 in Israeli football
