= 2006–07 Toto Cup Leumit =

Toto Cup Leumit
- Season: 2006–07
- Champions: Ironi Kiryat Shmona (1st title)

The 2006–07 Toto Cup Leumit was the 18th time the cup was being contested. The final was played at Kiryat Eliezer Stadium on 13 February 2007.

The winners were Ironi Kiryat Shmona, beating Bnei Sakhnin on penalties in the final after a 1–1 after 120 minutes.

== Group stage ==
Key to colours in group tables
Teams progressed to the Semifinals
Teams eliminated from the competition

=== Group A ===
Pos	Team	Pld	W	D	L	GF	GA	GD	Pts	BnS	HAC	HHA	HJE	MAN	HRH
1	Bnei Sakhnin	10	9	0	1	24	7	+17	27		3–1	3–2	2–0	2–0	4–0
2	Hapoel Acre	10	6	1	3	19	10	+9	19	1–0		1–2	3–1	2–1	5–0
3	Hapoel Haifa	10	3	4	3	8	8	0	13	0–2	1–0		0–0	1–1	2–0
4	Hapoel Jerusalem	10	4	1	5	14	16	−2	13	1–4	1–3	1–0		0–2	3–0
5	Maccabi Ahi Nazareth	10	3	3	4	11	13	−2	12	0–1	1–1	0–0	2–4		1–0
6	Hapoel Ramat HaSharon	10	0	1	9	4	26	−22	1	2–3	0–2	0–0	0–3	2–3	

Source: walla.co.il (in Hebrew)
Rules for classification: 1st points; 2nd goal difference; 3rd matches won; 4th goals scored; 5th head-to-head; 6th decision match

=== Group B ===
Pos	Team	Pld	W	D	L	GF	GA	GD	Pts	HBS	IKS	HAS	HRA	HNI	HBL
1	Hapoel Be'er Sheva	10	6	1	3	23	7	+16	19		1–1	0–1	2–0	7–0	2–0
2	Ironi Kiryat Shmona	10	5	2	3	17	9	+8	17	1–0		1–2	0–1	4–1	4–1
3	Hapoel Ashkelon	10	5	1	4	11	9	+2	16	0–1	2–1		3–1	0–1	0–2
4	Hapoel Ra'anana	10	4	1	5	10	15	−5	13	1–4	1–3	1–3		0–0	3–0
5	Hapoel Nazareth Illit	10	3	3	4	7	18	−11	12	3–2	0–0	0–0	0–1		2–1
6	Hapoel Bnei Lod	10	3	0	7	8	18	−10	9	0–4	0–2	1–0	0–1	3–0	

Source: walla.co.il (in Hebrew)
Rules for classification: 1st points; 2nd goal difference; 3rd matches won; 4th goals scored; 5th head-to-head; 6th decision match

=== Semifinals ===
16 January 2007
15:00

Hapoel Acre	1–2	Ironi Kiryat Shmona
Hanuka 70' (pen.)	Report	Seti 7' Yavruyan 66'

Kiryat Eliezer Stadium, Haifa
Referee: Abu-Zaila
16 January 2007
17:00

Hapoel Be'er Sheva	1–3	Bnei Sakhnin
Aharoni 32'	Report	Ganayem 36'; Khalaila 67'; Culma 90'

Kiryat Eliezer Stadium, Haifa
Referee: Lankri

=== Final ===
13 February 2007
17:00

Bnei Sakhnin	1–1 (a.e.t.)	Ironi Kiryat Shmona
Sani 56'	Report	Dora 7'
Penalties
Kadousi (penalty scored); Sani (penalty scored); Rabah (penalty missed); Brick (penalty missed)	2–4	(penalty scored) Tzarfati; (penalty scored) Lavi; (penalty scored) Yavruyan; (penalty scored) Hasarma

Kiryat Eliezer Stadium, Haifa
Attendance: 2,000
Referee: R. Ben-Itzhak

== See also ==
- Toto Cup
- 2006–07 Liga Leumit
- 2006–07 in Israeli football
