= Haberfeld =

Haberfeld is a surname. Notable people with the surname include:

- David Haberfeld (born 1969), Australian musician and producer
- Győző Haberfeld (1889 – c. 1945), Hungarian gymnast
- Haim Haberfeld, Israeli trade union and football federation leader
- Hanna Zemer, née Haberfeld (1925–2003), Israeli journalist and first female editor-in-chief of a major Israeli newspaper
- Mario Haberfeld (born 1976), Brazilian auto racing driver

== See also ==
- Haberfeld Stadium, multi-purpose stadium in Rishon LeZion, Israel
