= History of the Bosnia and Herzegovina national football team =

Bosnia and Herzegovina
- Nickname(s): Zmajevi (The Dragons); Zlatni ljiljani (The Golden Lilies)
- Association: Football Association of Bosnia and Herzegovina (N/FSBiH)
- Confederation: UEFA (Europe)
- Most caps: Edin Džeko (152)
- Top scorer: Edin Džeko (73)
- Home stadium: Bilino Polje

FIFA ranking
- Highest: 13 (August 2013)
- Lowest: 173 (September 1996)

World Cup
- Appearances: 2 (first in 2014)
- Best result: Round of 32 (2026)

The history of football in Bosnia and Herzegovina dates back to the early 1900s during the Austro-Hungarian rule.

The beginnings of the Bosnia and Herzegovina national football team itself date back to the team's formation and first ever international match in November 1995 days after the end of Bosnian War.

The team has qualified for two major tournaments so far: the FIFA World Cup in 2014 and 2026.

== History ==
=== Football under Yugoslav colors ===
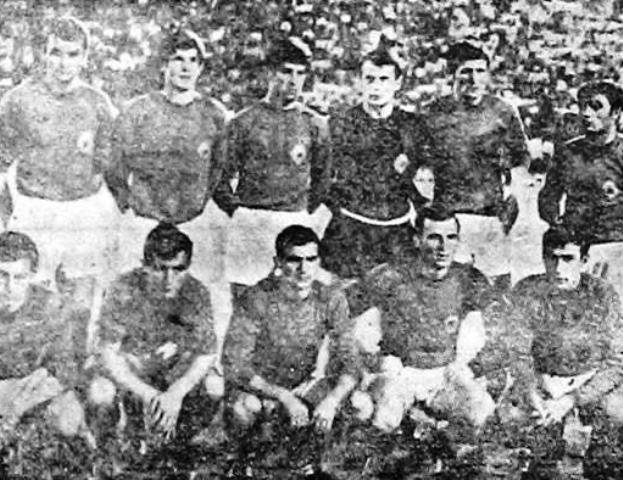
Yugoslavia squad at the UEFA Euro 1968 with players from SR Bosnia-Herzegovina; Mirsad Fazlagić (first standing), Vahidin Musemić (second) and Ivica Osim (fifth).

The game reached Bosnia and Herzegovina at the start of the 20th century, with Sarajevo (in 1903) and Mostar (in 1905) being the first cities to embrace it. Banja Luka, Tuzla, Zenica and Bihać were next along with numerous smaller towns as the sport began to spread.

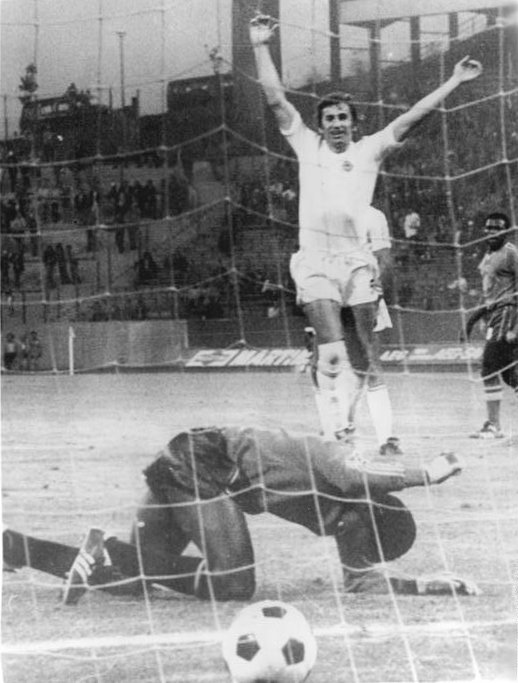
Sarajevan Josip Katalinski celebrates a Yugoslav goal vs Zaire at the 1974 FIFA World Cup.

The country was under Austro-Hungarian rule when official competition began in 1908, though these activities were on a small scale within each territory. At the outbreak of World War I, there were four clubs in Sarajevo—SAŠK, Slavija, Đerzelez (also known as Sarajevski), and Makabi Sarajevo (also known as Barkohba),—with approximately 20 more outside the capital.

The creation of the Kingdom of Yugoslavia after 1918 brought an increase in the number of leagues, with a national championship being played since 1923. Until 1940 it featured three teams from Bosnia and Herzegovina: Sarajevo clubs SAŠK and Slavija and Krajišnik from Banja Luka. In 1920, the direct predecessor of the football organization of Bosnia-Herzegovina was founded as the Sarajevo football subassociation. The unified championship ran until the 1939–40 season, followed by the start of the Second World War.

The Football Association of Bosnia and Herzegovina was founded after the Second World War, being affiliated to the Yugoslav Football Association, then part of the newly founded SFR Yugoslavia.

Bosnia and Herzegovina's best sides at the time were Sarajevo, Željezničar (Sarajevo) and Velež (Mostar) which regularly played in the Yugoslav First League, second league and cup competitions with moderate success, while its best players with the likes of Safet Sušić, Vahid Halilhodžić, Faruk Hadžibegić, Ivica Osim, Blaž Slišković, Mehmed Baždarević, Dušan Bajević; who notably scored a hat-trick at 1974 FIFA World Cup, Josip Katalinski, Asim Ferhatović, and others were chosen to represent the Yugoslavia national football team.

After the completion of UEFA Euro 1968, two players from SR Bosnia and Herzegovina, Mirsad Fazlagić and Ivica Osim, were chosen in the UEFA Team of the Tournament whilst representing the Yugoslavia national team that ended up reaching the final of the tournament.

Bosnian-Herzegovinian players who represented Yugoslavia at Major Competitions (1920–1990)
Competition	Players	Coaches
(Belgium) 1920 Summer Olympics	None	-
(France) 1924 Summer Olympics	None	-
(Netherlands) 1928 Summer Olympics	None	-
(Uruguay) 1930 FIFA World Cup	None	-
(United Kingdom) 1948 Summer Olympics	Miroslav Brozović, Branko Stanković	-
(Brazil) 1950 FIFA World Cup	Predrag Đajić, Branko Stanković	-
(Finland) 1952 Summer Olympics	Branko Stanković	-
(Switzerland) 1954 FIFA World Cup	Branko Stanković, Lev Mantula	-
(Australia) 1956 Summer Olympics	Kruno Radiljević, Ibrahim Biogradlić, Muhamed Mujić	-
(Sweden) 1958 FIFA World Cup	None	-
(France) 1960 UEFA Euro	Milan Galić, Tomislav Knez, Muhamed Mujić	-
(Italy) 1960 Summer Olympics	Milan Galić, Tomislav Knez, Velimir Sombolac	-
(Chile) 1962 FIFA World Cup	Vlatko Marković, Andrija Anković, Milan Galić, Muhamed Mujić, Nikola Stipić	-
(Japan) 1964 Summer Olympics	Ivan Ćurković, Mirsad Fazlagić, Svetozar Vujović, Ivica Osim	-
(Italy) 1968 UEFA Euro	Mirsad Fazlagić, Ivica Osim, Vahidin Musemić, Boško Antić, Idriz Hošić	-
(West Germany) 1974 FIFA World Cup	Enver Marić, Enver Hadžiabdić, Josip Katalinski, Franjo Vladić, Dušan Bajević, Rizah Mešković	-
(Socialist Federal Republic of Yugoslavia) 1976 UEFA Euro	Džemal Hadžiabdić, Josip Katalinski, Enver Marić, Vahid Halilhodžić, Edhem Šljivo, Franjo Vladić	-
(Soviet Union) 1980 Summer Olympics	Boro Primorac, Srebrenko Repčić, Miloš Šestić, Zoran Vujović, Zlatko Vujović, Dževad Šećerbegović, Vladimir Matijević	-
(Spain) 1982 FIFA World Cup	Edhem Šljivo, Zoran Vujović, Zlatko Vujović, Safet Sušić, Miloš Šestić, Vahid Halilhodžić, Predrag Pašić	-
(France) 1984 UEFA Euro	Mirsad Baljić, Miloš Šestić, Safet Sušić, Mehmed Baždarević, Zlatko Vujović, Faruk Hadžibegić, Sulejman Halilović	-
(United States) 1984 Summer Olympics	Mehmed Baždarević, Vlado Čapljić, Mirsad Baljić, Admir Smajić	-
(South Korea) 1988 Summer Olympics	Semir Tuce, Cvijan Milošević, Davor Jozić, Refik Šabanadžović	Ivica Osim, Džemaludin Mušović
(Italy) 1990 FIFA World Cup	Faruk Hadžibegić, Davor Jozić, Safet Sušić, Zlatko Vujović, Fahrudin Omerović, Refik Šabanadžović, Mirsad Baljić	Ivica Osim, Džemaludin Mušović

=== Early years of Bosnia-Herzegovina ===
Shortly after Bosnia and Herzegovina's independence from Yugoslavia, at the outbreak of Bosnian War, a selection of Bosnia and Herzegovina players under the name "Bosnia-Herzegovina Humanitarian Stars" took part in humanitarian friendly matches away from home versus K.R.C. Genk and 1. FC Kaiserslautern during March 1993. Blaž Slišković was the captain of this Bosnia and Herzegovina national side. A few months later, Bosnia and Herzegovina football team (players assembled mainly from then FK Sarajevo) under manager Fuad Muzurović played their first match against another national team, and it took place in Tehran against Iran. Bosnia and Herzegovina won 3–1. However the result was never registered as Bosnia and Herzegovina was not yet a member of FIFA.

"Congratulations on your victory. This is your way of fighting. This is the best way to present your young state to the world."

— Akbar Hashemi Rafsanjani, former President of Iran on Bosnia and Herzegovina 3–1 friendly win over Iran on June 06, 1993.

During the same period, on 22 July 1995, Bosnia and Herzegovina national team played another humanitarian match against Fortuna Düsseldorf, largely thanks to Aleksandar Ristić (Düsseldorf coach at the time) and Enver Marić (Düsseldorf goalkeeper coach) who were the most responsible for bringing the team to Germany at the time. Haris Škoro scored a brace for Bosnia and Herzegovina at the game which finished 2–2.

The team's first FIFA recognized friendly match, coming just nine days after the Dayton Peace Agreement brought an end to the Bosnian War, was played in Tirana against Albania on 30 November 1995. Then still a Republic of Bosnia and Herzegovina (as Dayton Agreement was formally signed on 14 December 1995 starting modern-day state of Bosnia and Herzegovina), the team was granted provisional FIFA membership to play this football game which Bosnia and Herzegovina lost 2–0. The team played in the shirts bought in neighbouring country's sports shops hours before the flight. The starting eleven playing under head coach Fuad Muzurović at that friendly contest were: Ismir Pintol, Vedin Musić, Ibrahim Duro, Muhamed Konjić, Senad Begić, Nedžad Fazlagić, Esmir Džafić, Enes Demirović, Husref Musemić, Asim Hrnjić, and Almir Turković.

Ticket stub for Bosnia home game v Croatia 1998 FIFA World Cup qualification at Stadio Renato Dall'Ara, Bologna due to the renovation of the Koševo Stadium.

Bosnia and Herzegovina national football team was not eligible to take part in FIFA World Cup 1994 qualifiers as the country only became a member of FIFA in July 1996. UEFA affiliation came in 1998 in Dublin and again the country missed out on taking part in UEFA Euro 1996 qualifiers. In doing so Bosnia and Herzegovina became the only nation in the world in the modern times to first become a member of the World football organisation FIFA followed by becoming member of its continental organisation, UEFA. The national team's first international victory as a FIFA member came against 1994 FIFA World Cup runners-up Italy on 6 November 1996. The former Yugoslav country was ranked 170, while Italy were fifth at the time (a gap of 165 spots).

==== Post-war period ====
Pos	Team	Pld	W	D	L	GF	GA	GD	Pts	Qualification
1	Denmark	8	5	2	1	14	6	+8	17	Qualification to 1998 FIFA World Cup
2	Croatia	8	4	3	1	17	12	+5	15	Advance to second round
3	Greece	8	4	2	2	11	4	+7	14	
4	Bosnia and Herzegovina	8	3	0	5	9	14	−5	9	
5	Slovenia	8	0	1	7	5	20	−15	1	

Bosnia and Herzegovina's first qualifying attempt for any major tournament saw them grouped with Greece, Denmark, and two former Yugoslav republics Croatia and Slovenia during qualifiers for the 1998 FIFA World Cup. On 1 September 1996, captained by Mehmed Baždarević, Bosnia and Herzegovina made their UEFA debut going down 3–0 versus Greece in their first ever official major tournament qualifying match. Bosnia and Herzegovina finished the group in fourth position, having beaten Slovenia twice, and beating Denmark 3–0 at home. Fuad Muzurović led the team at its first qualifying campaign. In the eventual tournament, Denmark reached Quarter-finals stage while Croatia took bronze.

Pos	Team	Pld	W	D	L	GF	GA	GD	Pts	Qualification
1	Czech Republic	10	10	0	0	26	5	+21	30	Qualify for final tournament
2	Scotland	10	5	3	2	15	10	+5	18	Advance to play-offs
3	Bosnia and Herzegovina	10	3	2	5	14	17	−3	11 (Note: Head-to-head points: Bosnia and Herzegovina 7, Lithuania 6, Estonia 4.)	
4	Lithuania	10	3	2	5	8	16	−8	11	
5	Estonia	10	3	2	5	15	17	−2	11	
6	Faroe Islands	10	0	3	7	4	17	−13	3	

Source: UEFA
Rules for classification: Qualification tiebreakers
Notes:

Mišo Smajlović's Bosnia and Herzegovina side only won 3 games from 10 played in the UEFA Euro 2000 qualifying campaign. The results were two losses against the Czech Republic, two losses against Scotland, a win and a draw against the Faroe Islands and Estonia respectively and a win and a loss against Lithuania. The team finished in third place level on points with Lithuania and Estonia but with a better head-to-head record.

On 25 April 2000, Bosnia and Herzegovina played a humanitarian game for Bosnian and Herzegovinian orphans against FIFA's World Stars XI in front of 25,000 people at the Koševo Stadium in Sarajevo. The game finished 0–1 in favour of the Stars through a Roberto Baggio penalty. Dunga and Ali Daei also made appearances for the World XI.

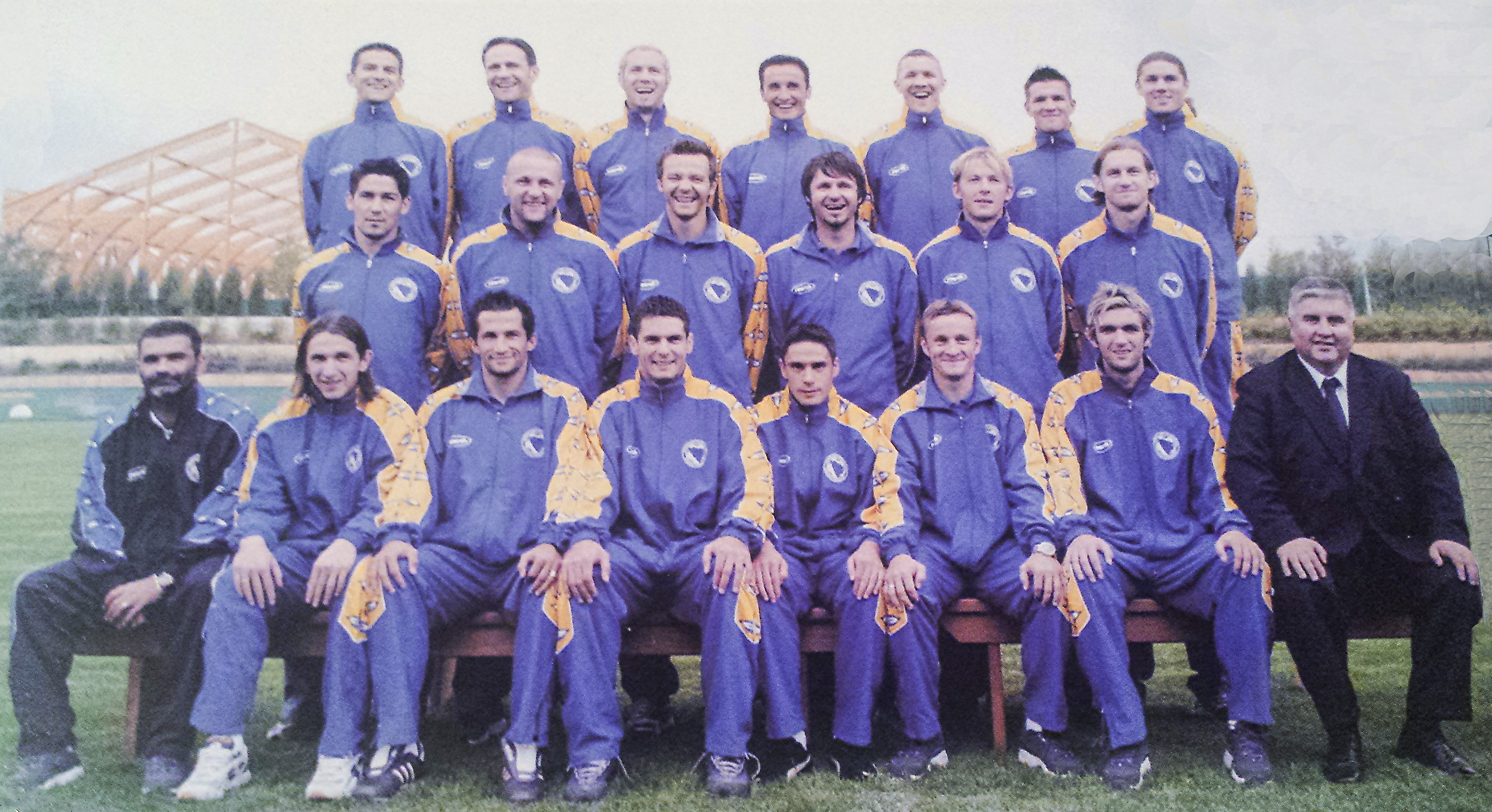
Bosnia-Herzegovina squad in March 2002 under manager Blaž Slišković ahead of UEFA Euro 2004 qualifying campaign.

Pos	Team	Pld	W	D	L	GF	GA	GD	Pts	Qualification
1	Spain	8	6	2	0	21	4	+17	20	Qualification to 2002 FIFA World Cup
2	Austria	8	4	3	1	10	8	+2	15	Advance to UEFA play-offs
3	Israel	8	3	3	2	11	7	+4	12	
4	Bosnia and Herzegovina	8	2	2	4	12	12	0	8	
5	Liechtenstein	8	0	0	8	0	23	−23	0	

In the World Cup 2002 qualifying round, the Bosnians and Herzegovinians continued the bad form and finished in fourth place, behind Spain, Austria and Israel having only beaten Liechtenstein both home and away. After this campaign Blaž Slišković was named to replace coach Mišo Smajlović.

Pos	Team	Pld	W	D	L	GF	GA	GD	Pts	Qualification
1	Denmark	8	4	3	1	15	9	+6	15	Qualify for final tournament
2	Norway	8	4	2	2	9	5	+4	14 (Note: Head-to-head points: Norway 4, Romania 1.)	Advance to play-offs
3	Romania	8	4	2	2	21	9	+12	14	
4	Bosnia and Herzegovina	8	4	1	3	7	8	−1	13	
5	Luxembourg	8	0	0	8	0	21	−21	0	

Source: UEFA
Rules for classification: Qualification tiebreakers
Notes:

Despite poor start, Bosnia had a chance to top their Euro 2004 qualifying group with a victory on the last match-day. Blaž Slišković's men started the qualifying campaign with two losses, home to Romania and away to Norway in Oslo. The following year, team beat Luxembourg and came out with a 2–0 win versus Denmark in Copenhagen. Romania however proved too strong once again for the Bosnians and Herzegovinians, scoring once in each half to prevail in Craiova. In September 2003 Bosnia and Herzegovina, thanks to Zlatan Bajramović's 87th-minute strike, beat Norwegians in Zenica. This followed with a victory over Luxembourg. Bosnia and Herzegovina climbed to third on the table with 12 points, and had a chance to top the group with a win over Denmark in Sarajevo. However, the game finished in a heartbreaking 1–1 home draw for the home side who had to settle for a fourth-place finish instead.

Pos	Team	Pld	W	D	L	GF	GA	GD	Pts	Qualification
1	Serbia and Montenegro	10	6	4	0	16	1	+15	22	Qualification to 2006 FIFA World Cup
2	Spain	10	5	5	0	19	3	+16	20	Advance to second round
3	Bosnia and Herzegovina	10	4	4	2	12	9	+3	16	
4	Belgium	10	3	3	4	16	11	+5	12	
5	Lithuania	10	2	4	4	8	9	−1	10	
6	San Marino	10	0	0	10	2	40	−38	0	

Rules for classification: Tiebreakers

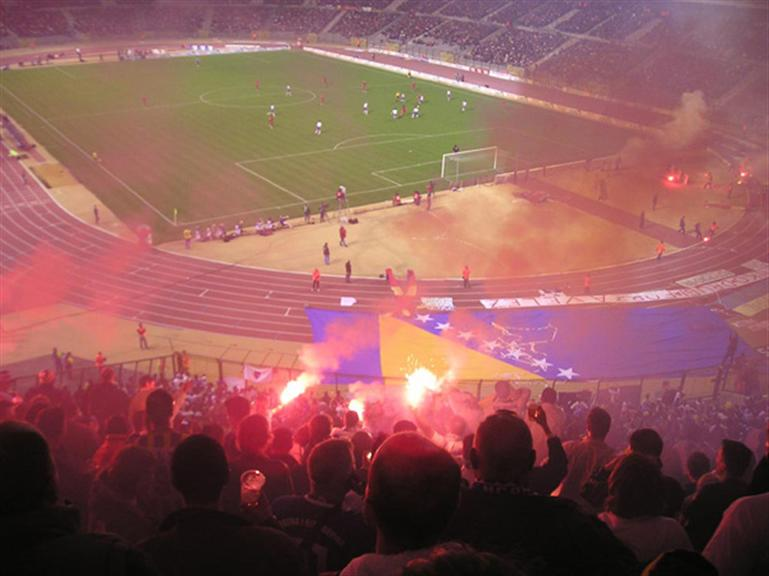
Bosnia against Belgium at King Baudouin Stadium in Brussels during the 2006 FIFA World Cup qualifier.

In the World Cup 2006 qualifying round, the Bosnians and Herzegovinians played Spain, drawing twice, Belgium (one win, one loss), Serbia and Montenegro (one draw, one loss), San Marino (two wins), but spilled crucial points at home against Lithuania playing only 1–1 (having won away). Against Serbia and Montenegro, Bosnia and Herzegovina drew at home but lost the second leg in Belgrade with a score 1–0. Bosnia and Herzegovina was hoping to finish in at least second position with an away win over their neighbours and hoping Spain to lose. Against Spain, Bosnia and Herzegovina led 1–0 for most of the match thanks to Zvjezdan Misimović's goal in the 39th minute but the game ended in draw when Carlos Marchena of Spain scored to level the game in the 96th minute at the Estadio Mestalla in Valencia, and after Bosnia had two players sent off. The match finished 1–1. Bosnia and Herzegovina finished third, and undefeated at home, in their World Cup 2006 qualifying group four points behind second placed Spain and four points in front of fourth placed Belgium.

Pos	Team	Pld	W	D	L	GF	GA	GD	Pts	Qualification
1	Greece	12	10	1	1	25	10	+15	31	Qualify for final tournament
2	Turkey	12	7	3	2	25	11	+14	24	Qualify for final tournament
3	Norway	12	7	2	3	27	11	+16	23	
4	Bosnia and Herzegovina	12	4	1	7	16	22	−6	13	
5	Moldova	12	3	3	6	12	19	−7	12 (Note: Tied on head-to-head points (3). Head-to-head goal difference: Moldova +1, Hungary −1.)	
6	Hungary	12	4	0	8	11	22	−11	12	
7	Malta	12	1	2	9	10	31	−21	5	

Rules for classification: Qualification tiebreakers
Notes:

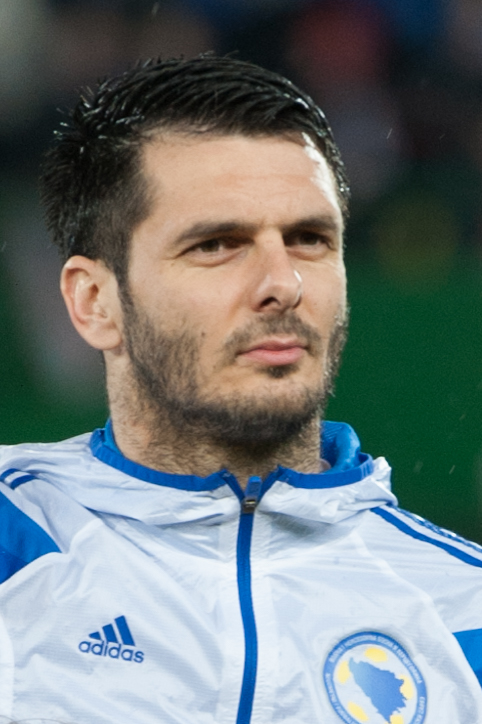
Emir Spahić captained Bosnia and Herzegovina at 2014 FIFA World Cup.

2008 UEFA European Football Championship qualifying campaign began with a 5–2 victory over Malta away. However, losses to Hungary and Greece at home, and a draw with Moldova in Chisinau led to Fuad Muzurović appointed as interim coach following the departure of Blaž Slišković. In addition to this change, 13 first team players refused to play for the national team, calling for four key Bosnia and Herzegovina Football Association officials at the time – Milan Jelić, Iljo Dominković, Sulejman Čolaković, and Ahmet Pašalić – to resign.

Edin Džeko, Vedad Ibišević, Sejad Salihović, Senijad Ibričić and Boris Pandža who played in the 2007 UEFA European Under-21 play-offs vs Czech Republic, commenced their senior careers at this point as a result of the recent changes within the squad.

Soon after Bosnia and Herzegovina beat Norway 2–1 in Oslo. In August 2007, the national team played a friendly match in Sarajevo against Croatia. Losing 3–5, with Zlatan Muslimović scoring a hat trick for Bosnia and Herzegovina.

After the game against Norway, Bosnia and Herzegovina continued with two further wins at home, a 3–2 victory against Turkey and a marginal victory against Malta. Edin Džeko and Elvir Rahimić made debut appearances for the Bosnia and Herzegovina against Turkey in Sarajevo. After these two games, two defeats at home to Hungary and Moldova followed. Bosnia and Herzegovina then suffered further defeats against Greece, Norway and Turkey, finishing their qualifiers in the fourth position. Following yet another failed campaign Meho Kodro was named as a replacement coach for Fuad Muzurović, however Meho Kodro was quickly dismissed after only a few months in charge.

In the game against Norway, at the Ullevål Stadium in Oslo on 24 March 2007, Bosnian fans caused an hour-long delay due to an unprecedented amount of flares that had been thrown onto the pitch in protest against corruption in the (now former) Football Federation of Bosnia. On 1 June 2008, former Bosnia and Herzegovina players Meho Kodro and Elvir Bolić organised a friendly humanitarian game in Sarajevo called "Kodro, Bola and Friends" between former Bosnian football legends, in order to gain support, to say its time for changes in the Bosnian Football Association. The game was organised to commence at the same time as Bosnia and Herzegovina national side faced Azerbaijan in a friendly in Zenica. The attendance in Sarajevo was 15,000 while in Zenica only about 50. The game in Sarajevo was organised by the Federalna TV who broadcast the humanitarian game live. A significant number of Bosnian International players were involved in the game, which ended 11–9 in favour of Team Kodro.

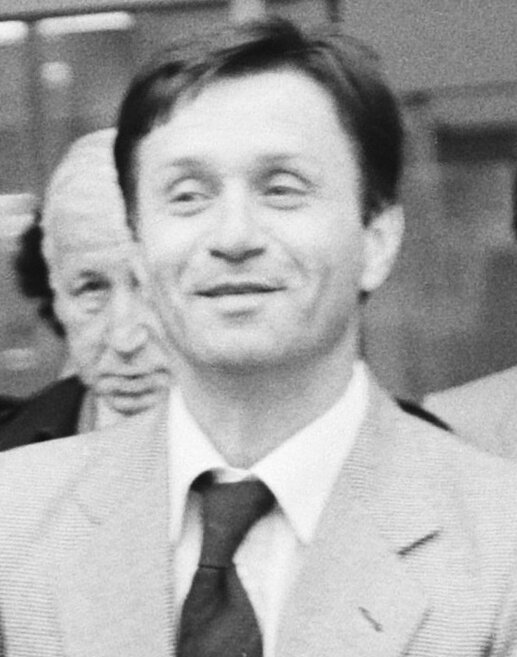
Miroslav Blažević took senior Bosnia-Herzegovina side to their first ever play-offs.

Pos	Team	Pld	W	D	L	GF	GA	GD	Pts	Qualification
1	Spain	10	10	0	0	28	5	+23	30	Qualification to 2010 FIFA World Cup
2	Bosnia and Herzegovina	10	6	1	3	25	13	+12	19	Advance to second round
3	Turkey	10	4	3	3	13	10	+3	15	
4	Belgium	10	3	1	6	13	20	−7	10	
5	Estonia	10	2	2	6	9	24	−15	8	
6	Armenia	10	1	1	8	6	22	−16	4	

Bosnia and Herzegovina football association announced Miroslav Blažević as the new manager for the World Cup 2010 qualifiers. In October 2009, the team qualified for the UEFA Second round in the 2010 FIFA World Cup qualification finishing second with a game to spare in a group won by then European champions Spain. Edin Džeko was the top scorer of the group, and achieved equal second place overall in the Europe section with 9 goals. Bosnia and Herzegovina played Portugal losing both games by single goal. Along the standard qualification process the team beat Belgium, Estonia and Armenia at both home and away, and drew one game with Turkey. Haris Medunjanin, Miralem Pjanić and Asmir Begović made their first appearances for the national side during these qualifiers.

14 November 2009

Portugal	1–0	Bosnia and Herzegovina

Estádio da Luz, Lisbon
18 November 2009

Bosnia and Herzegovina	0–1	Portugal

Bilino Polje, Zenica

Portugal won 2–0 on aggregate and qualified for the 2010 FIFA World Cup.

In the eventual tournament, Portugal went out in round of 16 stage of 2010 FIFA World Cup to the eventual champion Spain.

=== Major finals debut ===
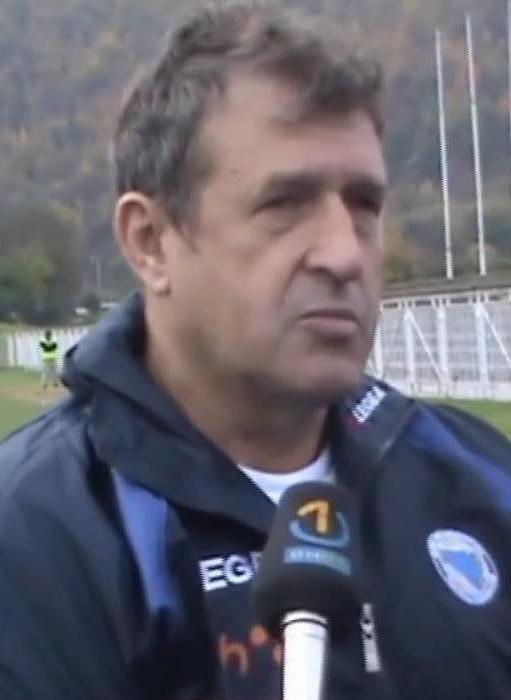
Safet Sušić guided Bosnia and Herzegovina to their first ever FIFA World Cup in Brazil.

Pos	Team	Pld	W	D	L	GF	GA	GD	Pts	Qualification
1	France	10	6	3	1	15	4	+11	21	Qualify for final tournament
2	Bosnia and Herzegovina	10	6	2	2	17	8	+9	20	Advance to play-offs
3	Romania	10	3	5	2	13	9	+4	14	
4	Belarus	10	3	4	3	8	7	+1	13	
5	Albania	10	2	3	5	7	14	−7	9	
6	Luxembourg	10	1	1	8	3	21	−18	4	

Source: UEFA
Rules for classification: Qualification tiebreakers

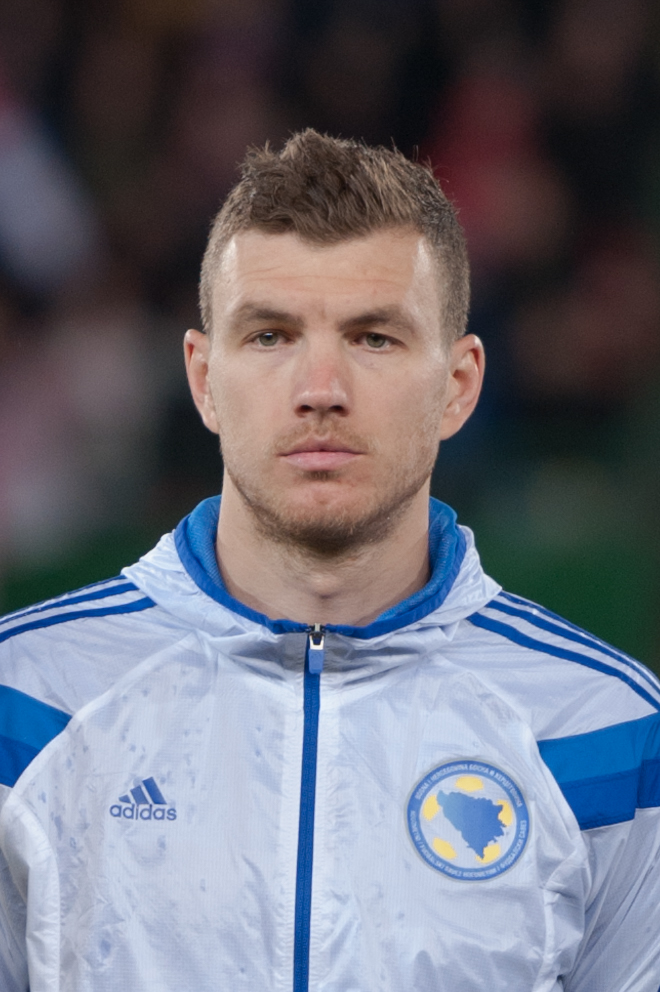
Edin Džeko is the top goalscorer and current captain.

The national team coached by Safet Sušić reached their second consecutive play-off berth during qualification for the UEFA Euro 2012 as they were unable to beat France national football team in Paris to qualify directly. The Bosnians and Herzegovinians had to win the game to top Group D and qualify for the tournament. Edin Džeko scored and they led 0–1 until the 77th minute when Scottish referee Craig Thomson awarded a penalty to France. The French leveled the game which meant that Bosnia and Herzegovina finished second, one point behind France.

Bosnia and Herzegovina was drawn to play Portugal, who were the eighth-ranked team in the world at the time, for the second play-off in a row. After a scoreless first leg, qualification would be decided in Portugal. Cristiano Ronaldo (two goals) and Nani both scored as Portugal went on to record a 6–2 win. Bosnia and Herzegovina went 2–0 down after 25 minutes. Zvjezdan Misimović scored in the 41st minute to reduce the score to 2–1 from a penalty kick before Cristiano Ronaldo again restored a two-goal advantage after the interval. At this point, Bosnia and Herzegovina were reduced to ten men as Senad Lulić received two yellow cards in less than a minute; In the 65th minute, Bosnia and Herzegovina captain Emir Spahić, reduced the deficit to one goal once again, knowing that a score draw was all that was required for Bosnia and Herzegovina to qualify for UEFA Euro 2012. However, Bosnia and Herzegovina lost 6–2 on the day, and on aggregate.

11 November 2011

Bosnia and Herzegovina	0–0	Portugal

Bilino Polje, Zenica
15 November 2011

Portugal	6–2	Bosnia and Herzegovina

Estádio da Luz, Lisbon

Portugal won 6–2 on aggregate and qualified for UEFA Euro 2012.

In the eventual tournament, Portugal went out in semi-final stage of Euro 2012 on penalties, yet with irony, to the eventual champion Spain, a repeat to the World Cup two years ago.

==== 2014 FIFA World Cup ====
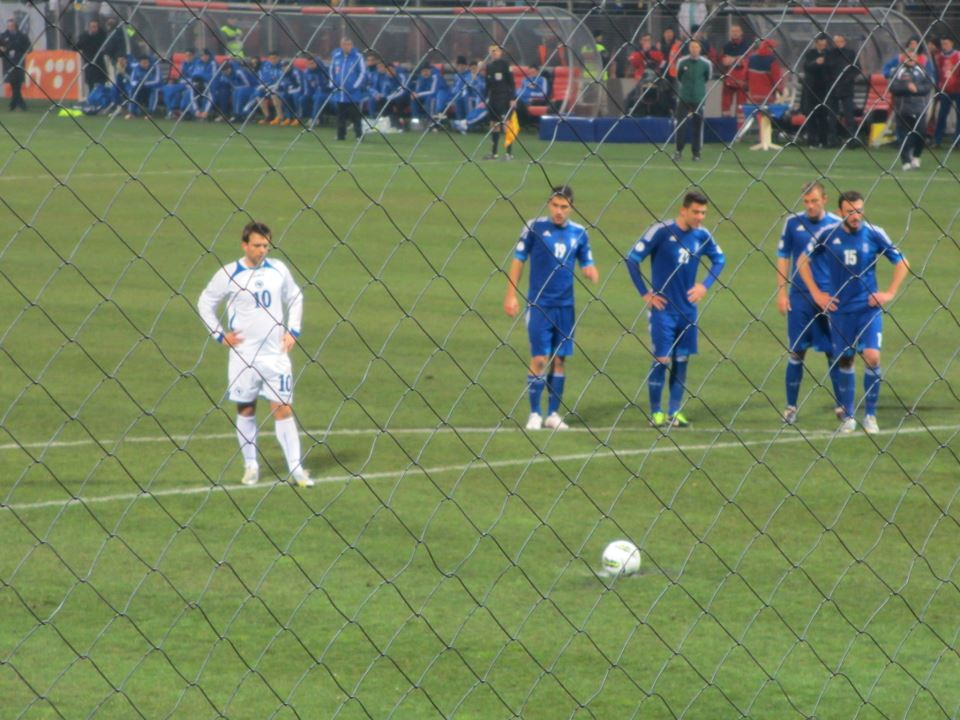
Zvjezdan Misimović scored five goals during 2014 FIFA World Cup qualifiers; lines up for a spot kick vs Greece at Bilino Polje Stadium.

Pos	Team	Pld	W	D	L	GF	GA	GD	Pts	Qualification
1	Bosnia and Herzegovina	10	8	1	1	30	6	+24	25	Qualification to 2014 FIFA World Cup
2	Greece	10	8	1	1	12	4	+8	25	Advance to second round
3	Slovakia	10	3	4	3	11	10	+1	13	
4	Lithuania	10	3	2	5	9	11	−2	11	
5	Latvia	10	2	2	6	10	20	−10	8	
6	Liechtenstein	10	0	2	8	4	25	−21	2	

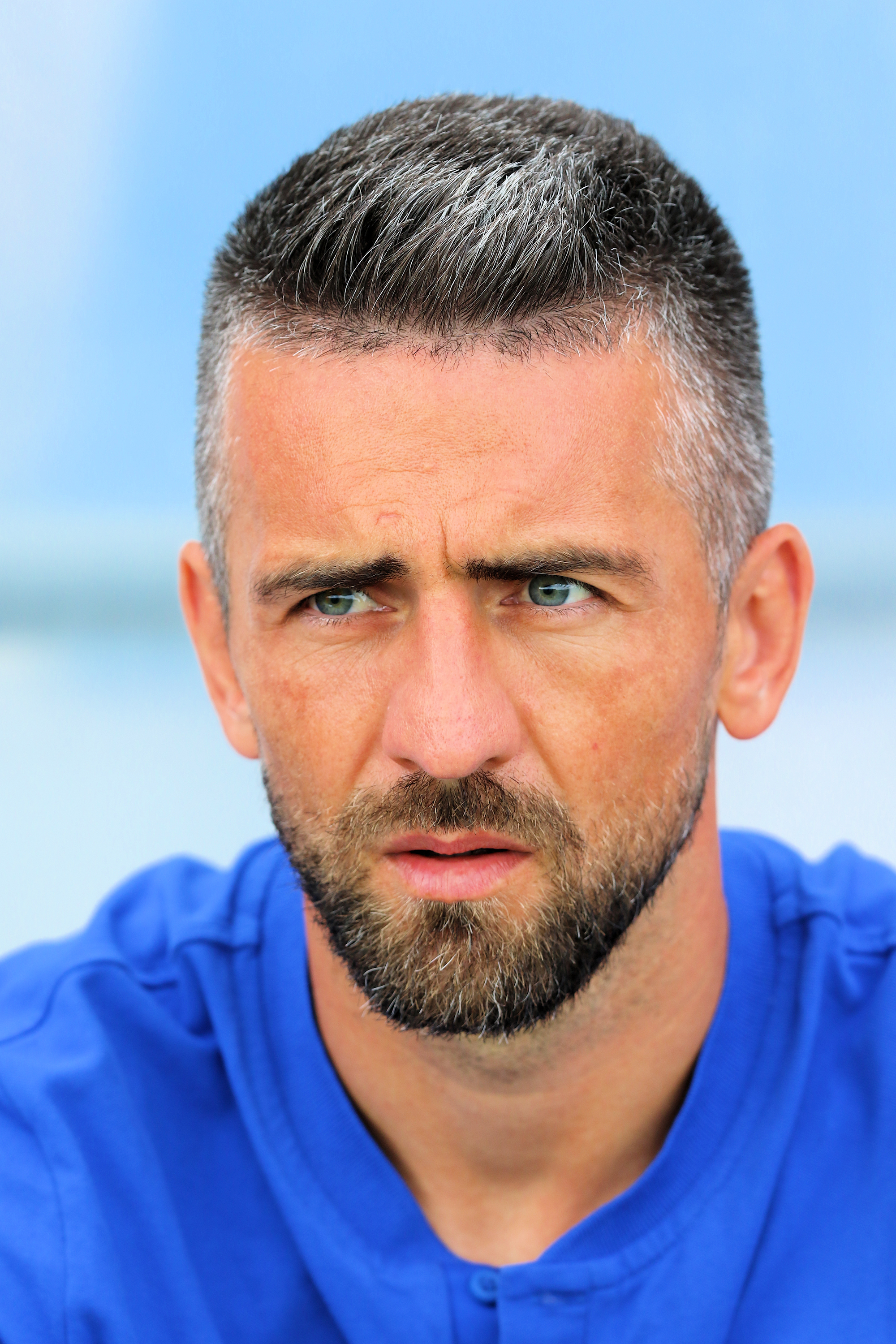
Vedad Ibišević scored Bosnia's first ever FIFA World Cup goal in a 2–1 loss to Argentina.

During the qualifying stage, Bosnia and Herzegovina managed by Safet Sušić, were drawn to face Greece, Slovakia (both of whom took part in 2010 FIFA World Cup), Lithuania, Latvia and Liechtenstein in Group G. The national side started the qualifiers with a 1–8 away victory over minnows Liechtenstein, recording the side's equal largest victory to date. The team continued the high goalscoring run, beating Latvia 4–1 and Lithuania 3–0, both at home, as well as holding out Greece to a 0–0 draw in Piraeus. Due to an injury, Miralem Pjanić missed out on a crucial qualifier reverse leg against Greece on 22 March 2013 which Bosnians won 3–1 with Edin Džeko scoring twice. This followed with a 5–0 win against Latvia in Riga.

A 0–1 loss to Slovakia on 6 September 2013 at home in Zenica allowed Greece to come level on points, however Bosnia and Herzegovina maintained its advantage (goal difference) with a hard-fought 2–1 win over Slovakia in Žilina four days later. Izet Hajrović, in only his second cap, scored a stunning 25m-strike with his very first contact with the ball (after coming on as a sub) to win it for the Bosnians. Bosnia and Herzegovina qualified for the World Cup for the first time in their history following a home 4–1 victory over Liechtenstein and a 1–0 away victory against Lithuania in Kaunas on 15 October 2013 with the lone strike coming courtesy of Vedad Ibišević. The national team finished level on 25 points with Greece, but their superior goal difference earned the top spot and an automatic place in the 2014 FIFA World Cup in Brazil. Edin Džeko with ten goals and Vedad Ibišević with eight goals scored, made for one of the most lethal partnerships in front of opposition goal during the European qualification phase.

Pos	Team	Pld	W	D	L	GF	GA	GD	Pts	Qualification
1	Argentina	3	3	0	0	6	3	+3	9	Advance to knockout stage
2	Nigeria	3	1	1	1	3	3	0	4	Advance to knockout stage
3	Bosnia and Herzegovina	3	1	0	2	4	4	0	3	
4	Iran	3	0	1	2	1	4	−3	1	

Source: FIFA
Rules for classification: Tie-breaking criteria

Bosnia and Herzegovina's starting lineup in their first ever World Cup match against Argentina

Bosnia headed into the finals tournament with confidence boosting friendly wins over both Mexico and Ivory Coast where they played with the lone centre forward in Edin Džeko and defensive midfielder in Muhamed Bešić, a 4–2–3–1 formation that Bosnia would take into World Cup due to concerns over the strength of opposition.

Drawn to face two time World Cup champions Argentina on 15 June 2014 at the famous Estádio do Maracanã in Rio de Janeiro for their first ever World Cup game, team also faced 2013 Africa Cup of Nations champions Nigeria, and Iran in Group F.

Pos	Team	Pld	W	D	L	GF	GA	GD	Pts	Qualification
1	Argentina	3	3	0	0	6	3	+3	9	Advance to knockout stage
2	Nigeria	3	1	1	1	3	3	0	4	Advance to knockout stage
3	Bosnia and Herzegovina	3	1	0	2	4	4	0	3	
4	Iran	3	0	1	2	1	4	−3	1	

Source: FIFA
Rules for classification: Tie-breaking criteria

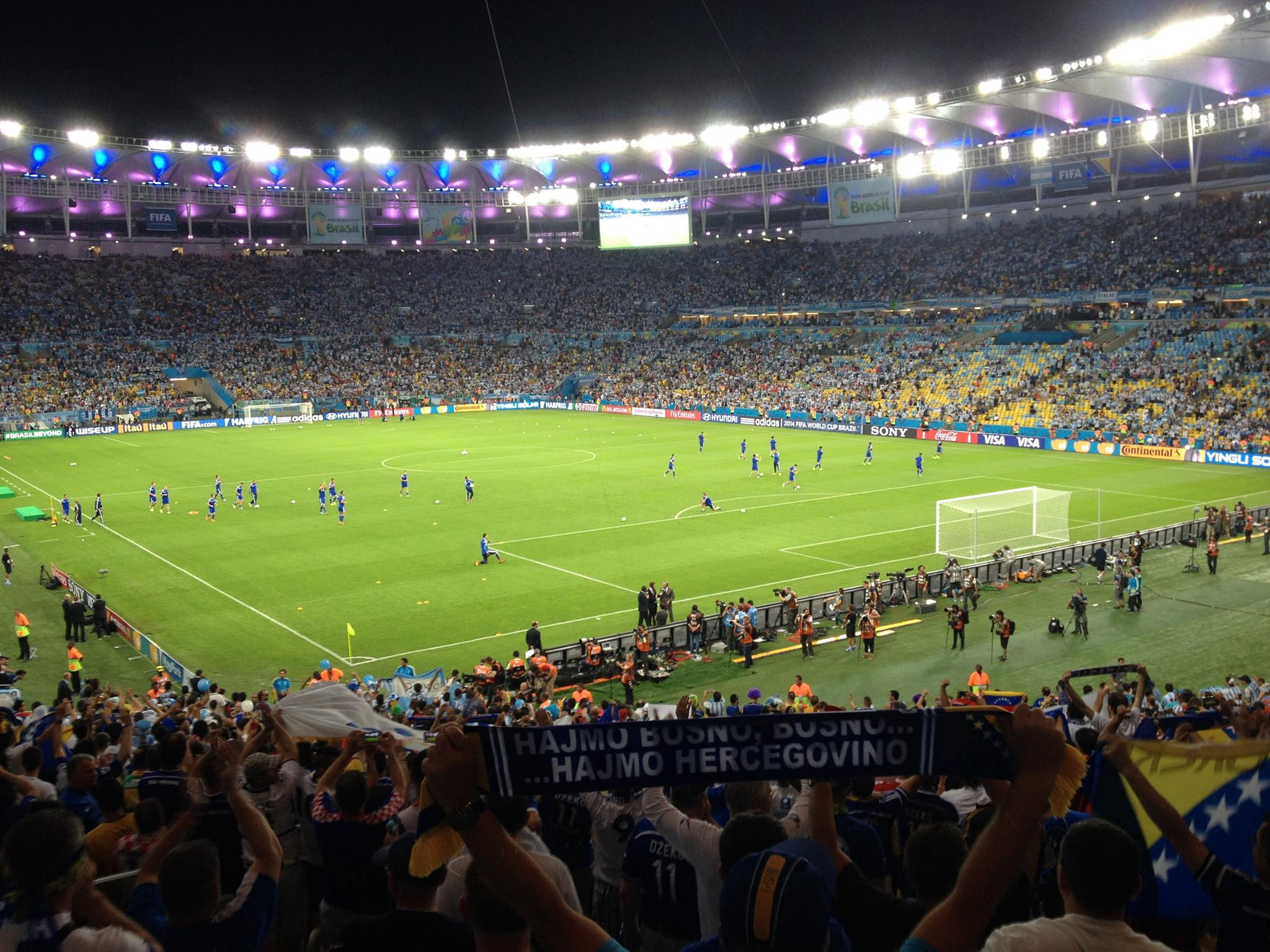
Bosnia players ahead of FIFA World Cup match vs Argentina on 15 June 2014 at Maracanã.

Bosnia and Herzegovina conceded three minutes into their World Cup debut against Argentina with a Sead Kolašinac own goal. In the 65th minute, Messi increased the Argentine lead scoring from the edge of the penalty area before Vedad Ibišević scored Bosnia's first ever World Cup goal for a final result of 1–2. On 21 June, at the Arena Pantanal in Cuiabá, Bosnia and Herzegovina played against Nigeria. Peter Odemwingie scored the only goal of the game, however during the first half Edin Džeko had a goal incorrectly disallowed for being offside by the assistant referee. The call was wrong by more than two meters which sparked controversy outcries from the Bosnian fans, especially after the circulation of a photo catching the match referee Peter O'Leary celebrating with the Nigerian goalkeeper for the match Vincent Enyeama. During the second half stoppage time Džeko was also unfortunate to have had his close range shot deflected onto the post by Nigerian goalkeeper. On 9 November 2014, Peter O’Leary, the game referee speaking to New Zealand Herald newspaper admitted Džeko's goal was disallowed in error.

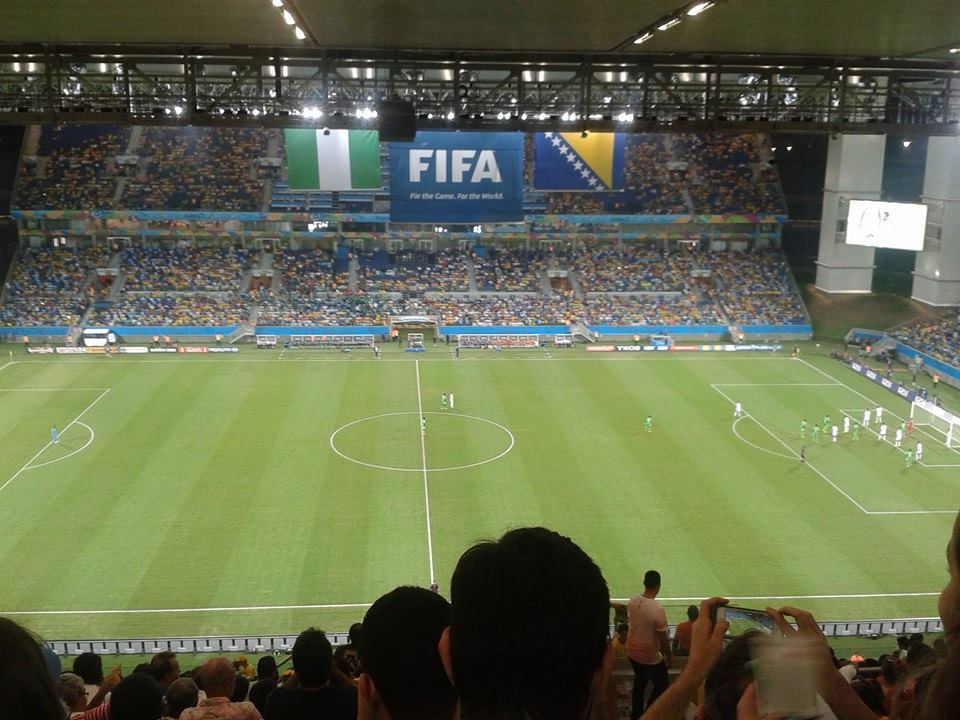
FIFA motto "For the Game. For the World." displayed during match marred with controversy between Nigeria and Bosnia at Arena Pantanal attended by 40,499 fans.

On 25 June, Bosnia-Herzegovina recorded its first World Cup victory, beating Iran 3–1, with the goals scored by Edin Džeko, Miralem Pjanić and Avdija Vršajević. Due to Bosnia's early elimination from the tournament, coach Safet Sušić experimented with the starting XI for this game, returning to a two-man front line that featured throughout qualifiers, and giving young players (who took no part in qualifiers) World Cup game time with the likes of Anel Hadžić (3rd cap), Tino-Sven Sušić (4th cap), Sead Kolašinac (6th cap) and Muhamed Bešić (12th cap). Bosnia finished the tournament in Group stage placed third, with three points from three matches played.

Bosnia were drawn to face Belgium, Israel, Wales, Cyprus and Andorra in UEFA Euro 2016 qualifying Group B.

Bosnia started the qualifiers with a shock 1–2 home loss to lowly Cyprus (ranked 121 places behind Bosnia in FIFA Ranking at the time). (Note: August 2014 FIFA World Rankings.) This followed with two draws, 0–0 with Wales in Cardiff, and 1–1 in Zenica vs Belgium. With both Edin Džeko and Vedad Ibišević out of their next game due to injuries, Bosnia were defeated by Israel in Haifa 0–3.

On 17 November 2014, Safet Sušić was sacked as manager of Bosnia due to a run of poor results, collecting just two points from four matches, in UEFA Euro 2016 qualifying. Bosnia was 7 points behind first placed Israel, who also played one game less.

==== Rise and fall period ====
Pos	Team	Pld	W	D	L	GF	GA	GD	Pts	Qualification
1	Belgium	10	7	2	1	24	5	+19	23	Qualify for final tournament
2	Wales	10	6	3	1	11	4	+7	21	Qualify for final tournament
3	Bosnia and Herzegovina	10	5	2	3	17	12	+5	17	Advance to play-offs
4	Israel	10	4	1	5	16	14	+2	13	
5	Cyprus	10	4	0	6	16	17	−1	12	
6	Andorra	10	0	0	10	4	36	−32	0	

Source: UEFA
Rules for classification: Qualification tiebreakers

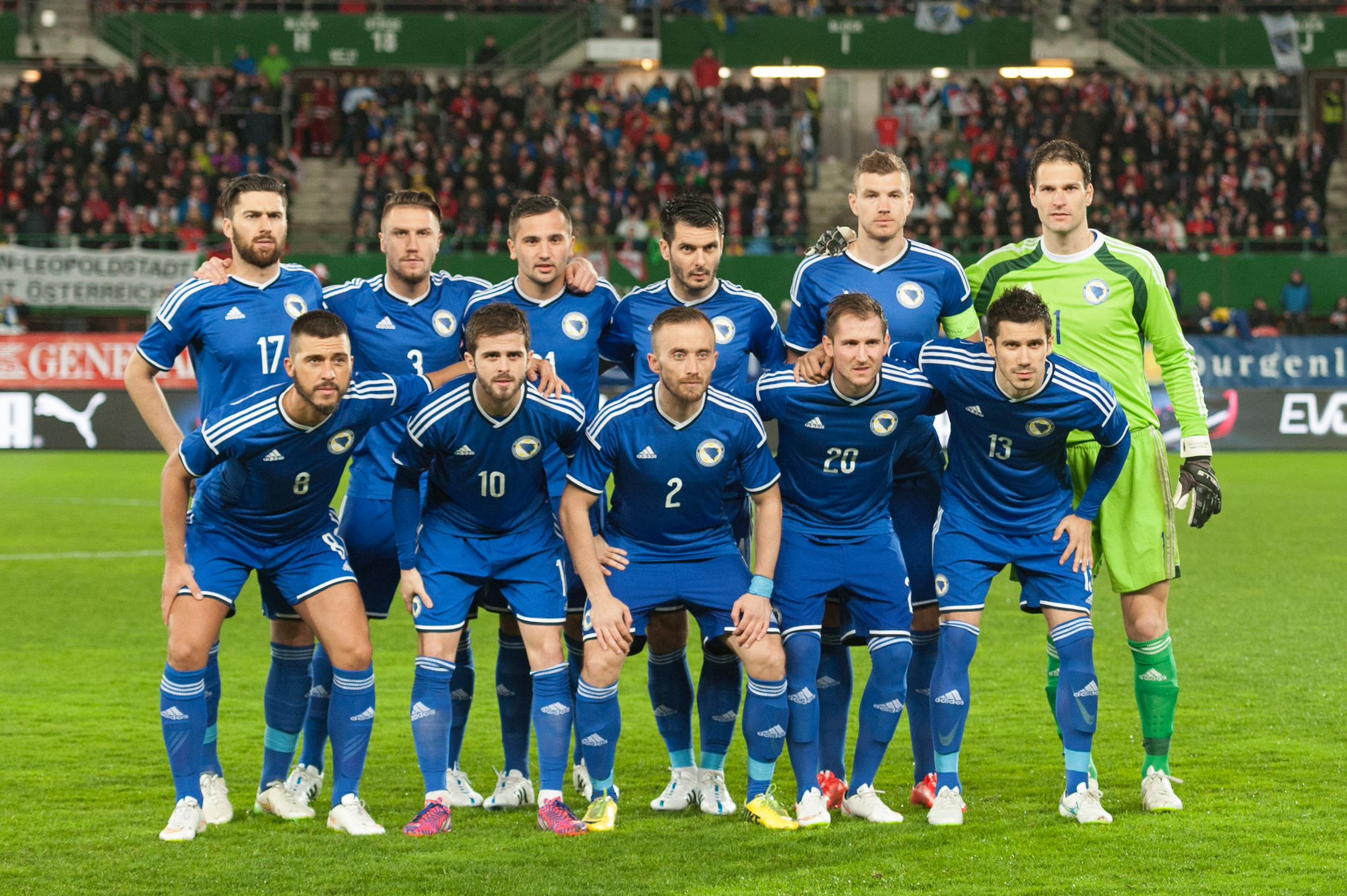
BiH squad in March 2015 vs Austria. Manager: Mehmed Baždarević Top left to right: Zukanović, Bičakčić, Hadžić, Spahić, Džeko, Begović. Bottom left to right: Medunjanin, Pjanić, Vršajević, Hajrović, Mujdža.

On 13 December 2014, Mehmed Baždarević was named the new manager of the Bosnia and Herzegovina national football team, and on 28 March 2015, debuted with a 3–0 victory over Andorra. Bosnia then continued its revival under Bazdarevic and beat Israel 3–1 in Zenica, with Edin Višća scoring his first goals for the national team. Bosnia lost their next game 3–1 to Belgium. This was followed by a routine 3–0 victory over Andorra, placing the Bosnians back within reach of the 3rd place playoff spot. Bosnia's next match in Zenica was against Wales, who were sitting atop the qualifying group. Bosnia was without key players Džeko, Bešić, and Kolašinac for the final two group stage matches. Bosnia and Herzegovina secured a playoff spot with victories over both Wales, 2–0 in Zenica, and Cyprus, 3–2 in Nicosia where Milan Đurić scored the decisive winner.

Bosnia were the highest seeded team coming into play-offs and drew to face Republic of Ireland, who finished behind Germany and Poland and ahead of Scotland in their qualifying group. Ireland's Walters and O'Shea were suspended for the first leg, as was Bešić for Bosnia, with Given and Long also ruled out injured for the Irish while Bosnia was near full strength. The Bosnians could not make the home advantage count as the fog-affected first leg finished in 1–1 draw. Regular starters Šunjić and Mujdža could not take part in second leg for Bosnia-Herzegovina due to injuries sustained in the first leg. Jonathan Walters, back for Ireland for the return leg, struck twice from set play in a packed Aviva Stadium, taking his side to UEFA Euro 2016 with a 3–1 aggregate win. Ibišević failed to reduce the deficit in injury time as his volley shot hit the crossbar. Bosnia and Herzegovina along with the Netherlands and Greece were the only nations from Pot 1 not to qualify for the finals. All three took part at the 2014 FIFA World Cup.

13 November 2015

Bosnia and Herzegovina	1–1	Republic of Ireland

Bilino Polje, Zenica
16 November 2015

Republic of Ireland	2–0	Bosnia and Herzegovina

Aviva Stadium, Dublin

Republic of Ireland won 3–1 on aggregate and qualified for UEFA Euro 2016.

At the finals, Republic of Ireland reached the round of 16 losing 1–2 to host nation France after being ahead 1–0 at half time; while Wales and Belgium famously faced each other in the quarter-finals stage of UEFA Euro 2016.

==== 2016 Kirin Cup – champions ====
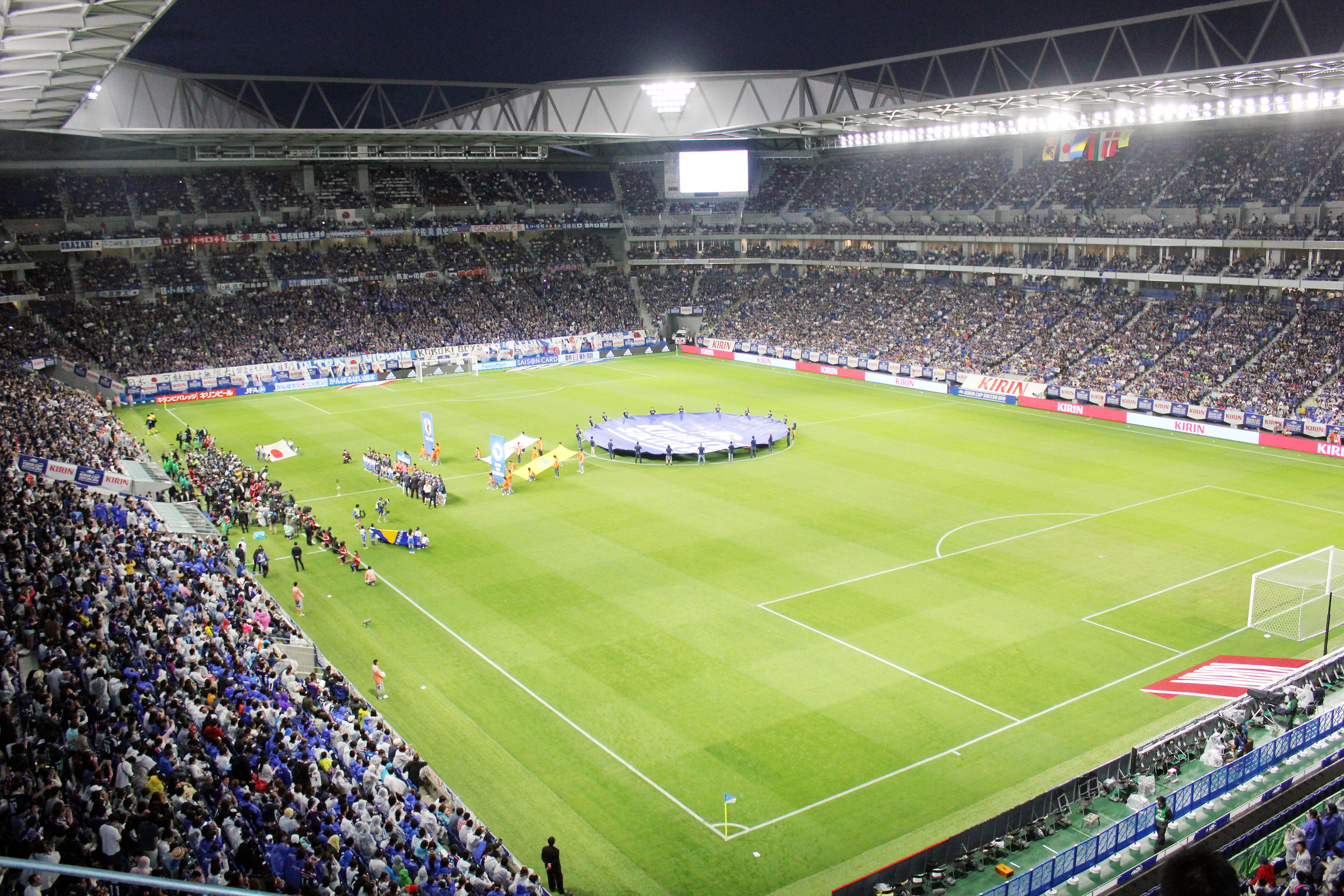
Japan hosting Bosnia at Suita City Stadium in Osaka during the final of 2016 Kirin Cup.

History was made for Baždarević's Bosnia-Herzegovina when the team won the 2016 edition of the Kirin Cup, beating Denmark and Japan along the way. Bosnia traveled to Japan without its most capped players in Roma duo Edin Džeko and Miralem Pjanić as well as Chelsea goalkeeper Asmir Begović and veteran defender Emir Spahić; giving opportunity to less experienced players to make their mark. In the first semi final, Milan Đurić scored a second half brace vs Denmark to draw the game level at full time, before Bosnia defeated Denmark on penalties in its first ever penalty shootout. In the final, Bosnia met host nation Japan, who outclassed Bulgaria in the other semi final 7–2. Đurić struck twice yet again to seal a historic 2–1 win at Suita City Football Stadium in Osaka, giving the Bosnia-Herzegovina national football team its first ever international trophy.

After the tournament, Đurić was nicknamed Bosnian Samurai by the Bosnian media due to his hair style and for being the tournament's top scorer and best player.

Pos	Team	Pld	W	D	L	GF	GA	GD	Pts	Qualification
1	Belgium	10	9	1	0	43	6	+37	28	Qualification to 2018 FIFA World Cup
2	Greece	10	5	4	1	17	6	+11	19	Advance to second round
3	Bosnia and Herzegovina	10	5	2	3	24	13	+11	17	
4	Estonia	10	3	2	5	13	19	−6	11	
5	Cyprus	10	3	1	6	9	18	−9	10	
6	Gibraltar	10	0	0	10	3	47	−44	0	

Source: FIFA
Rules for classification: Qualification tiebreakers

Bosnia failed to make back-to-back FIFA World Cup's after lackluster performances saw them spill crucial points during qualifiers on the way to 2018 FIFA World Cup in Russia. The team was in front in many matches of the UEFA Group H campaign including in a draw with Greece in Athens (Greeks scoring in 95th minute to level the match 1–1), Bosnia then led 2–0 at half time vs Cyprus away but lost that 2–3, and finally leading Belgium 2–1 in Sarajevo at half time but lost 3–4.

Following the retirement of several key, veteran players such as Senad Lulić, Vedad Ibišević, and Haris Medunjanin, Bosnia began the process of slowly rebuilding their national team with younger players. On 4 January 2018, Robert Prosinečki was named the new manager of the Bosnia and Herzegovina national football team. He made an immediate impact as the new manager of Bosnia-Herzegovina, topping 2018–19 UEFA Nations League B and ensuring promotion to League A and a qualifying playoff spot (but may still qualify directly) for UEFA Euro 2020. The team also went 9 matches without defeat (equaling the previous record under Sušić), having conceded just 1 goal in qualifiers for the elite round of UEFA Nations League, and finished 13th in Europe overall.

Pos	Team	Pld	W	D	L	GF	GA	GD	Pts	Promotion (Note: Due to revamp of the format for the 2020–21 UEFA Nations League, no teams were eventually relegated.)
1	Bosnia and Herzegovina (P)	4	3	1	0	5	1	+4	10	Promotion to League A
2	Austria	4	2	1	1	3	2	+1	7	
3	Northern Ireland	4	0	0	4	2	7	−5	0	

Source: UEFA
Rules for classification: Tiebreakers
(P) Promoted
Notes:

In spite of their successful Nations League performance, the UEFA Euro 2020 qualifying saw Bosnia with a stagnation of their performance. The Bosnian side started with a hard-fought 2–1 win over Armenia, before being held to a 2–2 draw by Greece at home in spite of holding a 2–0 lead. However, the biggest disappointment turned out to be a shock 0–2 away loss to Finland, before suffering a tough fought 1–2 away loss to Italy in Turin, putting them at only 4 points after four matches. Subsequent losses to Armenia, Greece, and Italy ensured Bosnia would not be able to finish in top two, as Bosnia finished 4th in their group with 13 points. However, the team was still able to qualify for the playoffs due to its successful Nations League's performance.

Pos	Team	Pld	W	D	L	GF	GA	GD	Pts	Qualification
1	Italy	10	10	0	0	37	4	+33	30	Qualify for final tournament
2	Finland	10	6	0	4	16	10	+6	18	Qualify for final tournament
3	Greece	10	4	2	4	12	14	−2	14	
4	Bosnia and Herzegovina	10	4	1	5	20	17	+3	13	Advance to play-offs via Nations League
5	Armenia	10	3	1	6	14	25	−11	10	
6	Liechtenstein	10	0	2	8	2	31	−29	2	

Source: UEFA

Bosnian manager Dušan Bajević was appointed following the resignation of Robert Prosinečki in hurried perpetration for the 2020–21 UEFA Nations League A, where Bosnia would have to deal with Poland, Netherlands and Italy, and for the UEFA Euro 2020 qualifying play-offs, which was rescheduled following the COVID-19 outbreak.

On 4 September 2020, Bosnia played an away match against Italy. Facing an Italian squad that had been entirely revamped, Bosnia managed to get an early lead thanks to Edin Džeko, but failed to defend it as the match ended 1–1. The game increased optimism among Bosnian supporters for having demonstrated a fair performance. However, Bosnia could not capitalize on the successful opening game when they returned home against Poland, losing 1–2 despite taking the lead.

In October, Bosnia faced up against the Dutch at home and gained another encouraging goalless draw. That was followed with an away trip to Poland, where Anel Ahmedhodžić earned a red card for a foul on Robert Lewandowski, ultimately losing 0–3 due to this moment, even though Bosnia had held the upper hand in the early minutes prior to the red card. The loss ensured that Bosnia would be unable to finish in first place, and pushed the Bosnians into a fight to avoid relegation. Unfortunately, Bosnia's away trip to the Netherlands ended up with another nightmare when Bosnia lost 1–3 to the Dutch, and by this point, Bosnia and Herzegovina had been relegated. With the national team completely demoralized with the defeat, the Bosnians headed home with hopes to salvage some pride against a confident Italian side, at least to prevent Italy from winning the group, but it didn't change as Bosnia lost 0–2 and was finally relegated in a denting fashion with two draws and four defeats.

Pos	Team	Pld	W	D	L	GF	GA	GD	Pts	Qualification or relegation
1	Italy	6	3	3	0	7	2	+5	12	Qualification for Nations League Finals
2	Netherlands	6	3	2	1	7	4	+3	11	
3	Poland	6	2	1	3	6	6	0	7	
4	Bosnia and Herzegovina (R)	6	0	2	4	3	11	−8	2	Relegation to League B

Source: UEFA
Rules for classification: Tiebreakers
(R) Relegated

Following the first two games of the 2020–21 UEFA Nations League, Bosnia and Herzegovina played in the UEFA Euro 2020 qualification play-offs, where the opponent in their first game happened to be Northern Ireland, a team that Bosnia beat twice in the previous Nations League season. However, a surprise resurgence from the Northern Irish side managed to stun predictions, beating Bosnia on penalties (4–3) after a 1–1 draw, with Bosnia once again missing a major competition.

Semi-finals

8 October 2020
20:45

Bosnia and Herzegovina	1–1 (a.e.t.)	Northern Ireland
Krunić 14'	Report	McGinn 53'
Penalties
Pjanić (penalty scored); Hajradinović (penalty missed); Višća (penalty missed); Hotić (penalty scored); Džeko (penalty scored)	3–4	(penalty scored) Dallas; (penalty scored) Lafferty; (penalty missed) Saville; (penalty scored) Washington; (penalty scored) Boyce

Stadion Grbavica, Sarajevo
Attendance: 1,800
Referee: Antonio Mateu Lahoz (Spain)

On 21 January 2021, Bulgarian Ivaylo Petev was announced as the new manager ahead of the country's 2022 FIFA World Cup qualifiers. This marked the first time a Bosnia and Herzegovina manager was not from the former Yugoslavia.

Bosnia played their first 2022 World Cup qualifier game on 24 March 2021, in a game against Finland in Helsinki, which ended as a 2–2 draw. They subsequently played France in a home match at Grbavica, where they suffered a hard fought 0–1 loss.

In September, Bosnia was able to earn an away point against reigning World Cup champions France with a 1–1 draw following an opening goal by Edin Džeko, only to follow it up with a disappointing 2–2 draw against Kazakhstan in Zenica following a last minute goal by the Kazakhstanis. Then, in October, an injury riddled Bosnia again faced off against Kazakhstan, this time in Nur-Sultan, winning 2–0 in a must win game, and subsequently keeping their World Cup qualifying dreams alive. Three days later, Bosnia faced Ukraine in Lviv, where they earned a point following a 1–1 result.

Bosnia, now needing a minimum of 4 points from their two remaining matches (Finland and Ukraine) to qualify for a playoff spot, faced off against Finland in Zenica. Playing without an injured Edin Džeko, Bosnia lost 1-3 and were therefore eliminated from playoff contention, and subsequently lost any chance of qualifying for the 2022 FIFA World Cup. They then lost their final game in the qualifying round, a 0-2 home defeat against eventual 2nd place finishers Ukraine.

Pos	Team	Pld	W	D	L	GF	GA	GD	Pts	Qualification
1	France	8	5	3	0	18	3	+15	18	Qualification for 2022 FIFA World Cup
2	Ukraine	8	2	6	0	11	8	+3	12	Advance to play-offs
3	Finland	8	3	2	3	10	10	0	11	
4	Bosnia and Herzegovina	8	1	4	3	9	12	−3	7	
5	Kazakhstan	8	0	3	5	5	20	−15	3	

Source: FIFA, UEFA
Rules for classification: Tiebreakers

Following another disappointing World Cup qualification, Bosnia and Herzegovina turned to the 2022–23 UEFA Nations League B in an attempt to earn promotion to League A and at the same time guarantee a play-off spot for the UEFA Euro 2024.

Hard fought away draws against Finland and Montenegro and home wins versus Romania and Finland saw Bosnia and Herzegovina on top of the group after the first four games. A win against Montenegro at home in Zenica followed, officially securing them a UEFA Euro 2024 qualifying play-off spot, as well as a spot back in the UEFA Nations League A. This subsequently allowed Petev to experiment with younger players for the final away match against Romania, which ultimately ended as their first and only loss of the group.

Pos	Team	Pld	W	D	L	GF	GA	GD	Pts	Promotion or relegation
1	Bosnia and Herzegovina (P)	6	3	2	1	8	8	0	11	Promotion to League A
2	Finland	6	2	2	2	8	6	+2	8	
3	Montenegro	6	2	1	3	6	6	0	7 (Note: Head-to-head points: Montenegro 6, Romania 0.)	
4	Romania (R)	6	2	1	3	6	8	−2	7	Relegation to League C

Source: UEFA
Rules for classification: Tiebreakers
(P) Promoted; (R) Relegated
Notes:

Pos	Team	Pld	W	D	L	GF	GA	GD	Pts	Qualification
1	Portugal	10	10	0	0	36	2	+34	30	Qualify for final tournament
2	Slovakia	10	7	1	2	17	8	+9	22	Qualify for final tournament
3	Luxembourg	10	5	2	3	13	19	−6	17	Advance to play-offs via Nations League
4	Iceland	10	3	1	6	17	16	+1	10	Advance to play-offs via Nations League
5	Bosnia and Herzegovina	10	3	0	7	9	20	−11	9	Advance to play-offs via Nations League
6	Liechtenstein	10	0	0	10	1	28	−27	0	

Source: UEFA
Rules for classification: Qualification tiebreakers

=== New era - return to the finals ===
Pos	Team	Pld	W	D	L	GF	GA	GD	Pts	Qualification or relegation
1	Germany	6	4	2	0	18	4	+14	14	Advance to quarter-finals
2	Netherlands	6	2	3	1	13	7	+6	9	Advance to quarter-finals
3	Hungary (R)	6	1	3	2	4	11	−7	6	Qualification for relegation play-offs
4	Bosnia and Herzegovina (R)	6	0	2	4	4	17	−13	2	Relegation to League B

Source: UEFA
Rules for classification: Tiebreakers
(R) Relegated

==== 2026 FIFA World Cup ====
Pos	Team	Pld	W	D	L	GF	GA	GD	Pts	Qualification
1	Austria	8	6	1	1	22	4	+18	19	Qualification for 2026 FIFA World Cup
2	Bosnia and Herzegovina	8	5	2	1	17	7	+10	17	Advance to play-offs
3	Romania	8	4	1	3	19	10	+9	13	Advance to play-offs via Nations League
4	Cyprus	8	2	2	4	11	11	0	8	
5	San Marino	8	0	0	8	2	39	−37	0	

Source: FIFA, UEFA
Rules for classification: Tiebreakers

Under their new manager, former national team captain Sergej Barbarez, Bosnia and Herzegovina played well in their 2026 FIFA World Cup qualifying group. Following a victory over Romania at home on 15 November, Barbarez's side needed to defeat Austria three days later in the final group match to qualify directly for the World Cup. Despite holding on to a 1–0 lead until the 77th minute, the match ended in a draw. As a result, Barbarez's team finished second in the group, two points behind Austria, securing a spot in the playoffs. In the playoffs, Bosnia and Herzegovina was the overwhelming underdog, they defeated both Wales and Italy on penalties, qualifying for the 2026 World Cup and marking their second appearance as an independent nation.

Semi-finals

26 March 2026
20:45 (19:45 UTC+0)

Wales	1–1 (a.e.t.)	Bosnia and Herzegovina
D. James 51'	Report (FIFA); Report (UEFA)	Džeko 86'
Penalties
Wilson (penalty scored); Harris (penalty scored); Johnson (penalty missed); Williams (penalty missed)	2–4	(penalty missed) Demirović; (penalty scored) Tabaković; (penalty scored) Bašić; (penalty scored) Hadžiahmetović; (penalty scored) Alajbegović

Cardiff City Stadium, Cardiff
Attendance: 32,487
Referee: István Kovács (Romania)

Final

31 March 2026
20:45

Bosnia and Herzegovina	1–1 (a.e.t.)	Italy
Tabaković 79'	Report (FIFA); Report (UEFA)	Kean 15'
Penalties
Tahirović (penalty scored); Tabaković (penalty scored); Alajbegović (penalty scored); Bajraktarević (penalty scored)	4–1	(penalty missed) Esposito; (penalty scored) Tonali; (penalty missed) Cristante

Bilino Polje Stadium, Zenica
Attendance: 9,500
Referee: Clément Turpin (France)

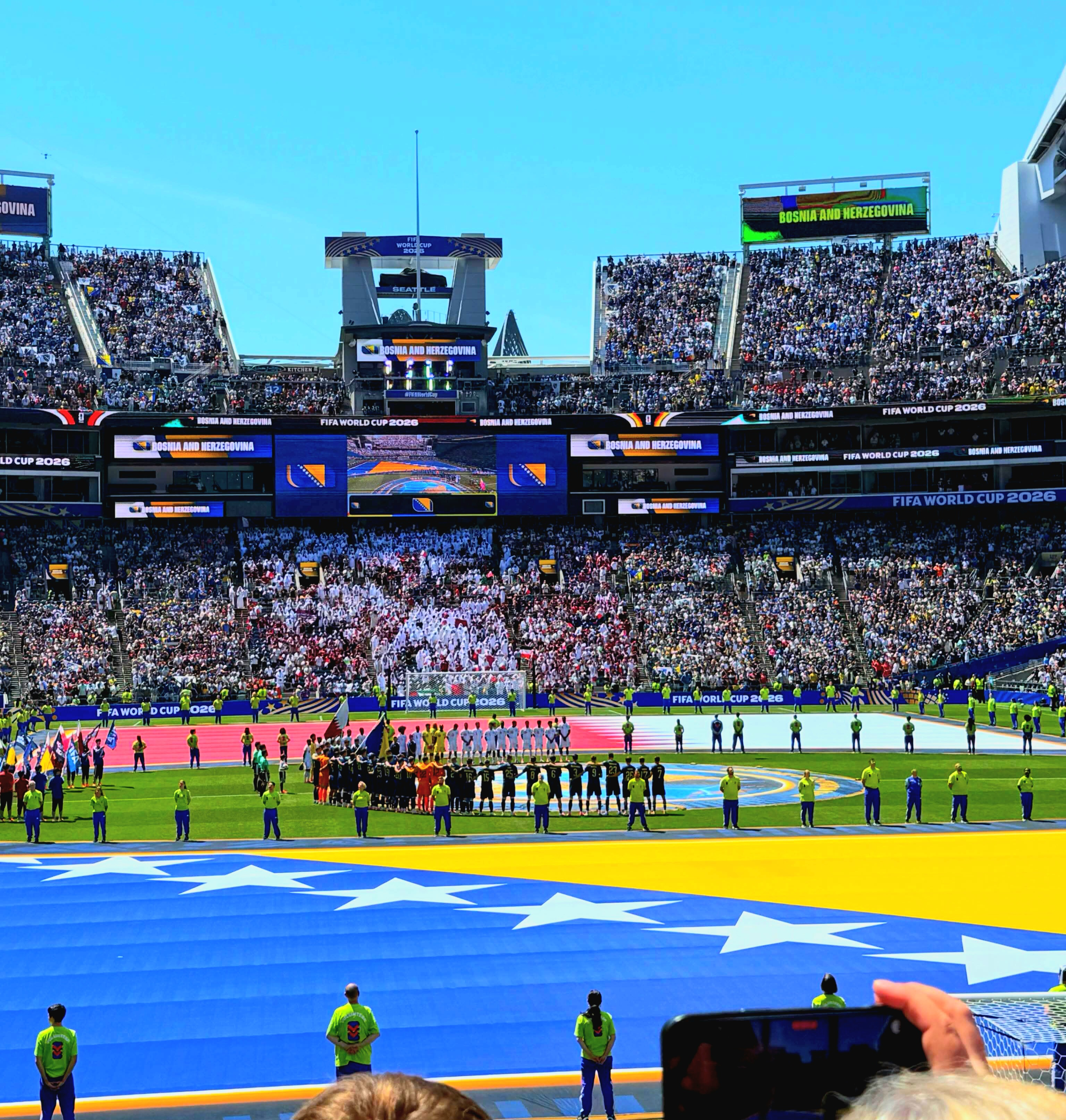
Bosnia-Herzegovina during 2026 FIFA World Cup at Lumen Field in Seattle.

At the tournament, Bosnia and Herzegovina finished in third based on goal difference, and their performance secured them as one of the eight best third-place teams, allowing them to progress to the knockout stage; a historic first for the nation.

Pos	Team	Pld	W	D	L	GF	GA	GD	Pts	Qualification
1	Switzerland	3	2	1	0	7	3	+4	7	Advance to knockout stage
2	Canada (H)	3	1	1	1	8	3	+5	4 (Note: Tied on head-to-head result (Canada 1–1 Bosnia and Herzegovina). Overall goal difference was used as the tiebreaker.)	Advance to knockout stage
3	Bosnia and Herzegovina	3	1	1	1	5	6	−1	4	Advance to knockout stage
4	Qatar	3	0	1	2	2	10	−8	1	

Source: FIFA
Rules for classification: Group stage tiebreakers
(H) Hosts
Notes:

In the round of 32, Bosnia and Herzegovina played against the United States. In the 45th minute, the US took the lead when Folarin Balogun scored. In the 64th minute, Balogun was sent-off with a straight red card after fouling Tarik Muharemović. Despite numerical superiority, Bosnia and Herzegovina struggled to convert their advantage, before Malik Tillman made it 2–0 in the 82nd minute when he scored from a free-kick, ensuring the US' progress to the round of 16.

July 1, 2026
5:00 p.m. UTC−7

United States	2–0	Bosnia and Herzegovina
Balogun 45'; Tillman 82'

Levi's Stadium, Santa Clara
Attendance: 68,827
Referee: Raphael Claus (Brazil)

== See also ==
- Bosnia and Herzegovina national football team records and statistics
- Bosnia and Herzegovina national football team results (1995–2019)
- Bosnia and Herzegovina national football team results (2020–present)
