= 2006–07 in Israeli football =

Football in Israel
- Season: 2006–07

Men's football
- Israeli Premier League: Beitar Jerusalem
- Liga Leumit: Ironi Kiryat Shmona
- Liga Artzit: Hapoel Ramat Gan
- State Cup: Hapoel Tel Aviv
- Supercup: Maccabi Herzliya

The 2006–07 season was the 59th season of competitive football in Israel, and the 80th season under the Israeli Football Association, established in 1928, during the British Mandate.

== IFA Competitions ==
=== League Competitions ===
Competition		Winner	Runner-up
Israeli Premier League		Beitar Jerusalem	Maccabi Netanya
Liga Leumit		Ironi Kiryat Shmona	Bnei Sakhnin
Liga Artzit		Hapoel Ramat Gan	Ironi Rishon LeZion
Liga Alef	North	Hapoel Bnei Jadeidi	Hapoel Umm al-Fahm
Liga Alef	South	Hapoel Maxim Lod	Hapoel Kfar Shalem
Liga Bet	North A	Beitar Ihud Mashhad	Ahva Arraba
Liga Bet	North B	Ironi Sayid Umm al-Fahm	Ironi Tiberias
Liga Bet	South A	Maccabi Kfar Yona	Beitar Kfar Saba
Liga Bet	South B	Maccabi Netivot	Hapoel Masos/Segev Shalom
Liga Gimel	Upper Galilee	Ahi Acre	F.C. Ahva Kafr Manda
Liga Gimel	Jezreel	Maccabi Beit She'an	Hapoel Kvalim Mesilot
Liga Gimel	Shomron	Maccabi Barta'a	Hapoel Bnei Jisr az-Zarqa
Liga Gimel	Sharon	Hapoel Pardesiya	F.C. Tira
Liga Gimel	Tel Aviv	F.C. Ironi Or Yehuda	Ortodixim Jaffa
Liga Gimel	Center-South	Bnei Eilat	F.C. Be'er Sheva
Ligat Nashim (Women's League)	Ligat Nashim Rishona	Maccabi Holon	ASA Tel Aviv University
Ligat Nashim (Women's League)	Ligat Nashim Shniya	Ironi Bat Yam	Beitar Jerusalem
Noar Leumit (U-20)		Beitar Jerusalem	Maccabi Petah Tikva

=== Cup Competitions ===
Competition		Winner	Runner-up
2006–07 Israel State Cup		Hapoel Tel Aviv	Hapoel Ashkelon
Toto Cup	Al	Maccabi Herzliya	Hapoel Kfar Saba
Toto Cup	Leumit	Ironi Kiryat Shmona	Bnei Sakhnin
Toto Cup	Artzit	Hapoel Ramat Gan	Sektzia Nes Tziona
Israeli Women's Cup		Maccabi Holon	ASA Tel Aviv University
Israel Noar State Cup		Beitar Jerusalem	F.C. Ashdod

== International Club Competitions ==
=== Champions League ===
==== Third qualifying round ====
Team 1	Agg.	Team 2	1st leg	2nd leg
Liverpool (England)	3–2	(Israel) Maccabi Haifa	1–1	2–1

=== Uefa Cup ===
==== Second qualifying round ====
Team 1	Agg.	Team 2	1st leg	2nd leg
Hapoel Tel Aviv (Israel)	4–2	(Slovenia) Domžale	1–2	3–0
Dinamo Bucharest (Romania)	2–1	(Israel) Beitar Jerusalem	1–0	1–1
Bnei Yehuda (Israel)	0–6	(Bulgaria) Lokomotiv Sofia	0–2	0–4

==== First round ====
Team 1	Agg.	Team 2	1st leg	2nd leg
Chornomorets Odesa (Ukraine)	1–4	(Israel) Hapoel Tel Aviv	0–1	1–3
Maccabi Haifa (Israel)	4–2	(Bulgaria) Litex Lovech	1–1	3–1

==== Group stage ====
===== Group A =====
Pos	Team	Pld	W	D	L	GF	GA	GD	Pts	Qualification	RAN	MHA	LIV	AUX	PTZ
1	(Scotland) Rangers	4	3	1	0	8	4	+4	10	Advance to knockout stage	—	2–0	—	—	1–0
2	(Israel) Maccabi Haifa	4	2	1	1	5	4	+1	7	Advance to knockout stage	—	—	—	3–1	1–0
3	(Italy) Livorno	4	1	2	1	5	5	0	5	Advance to knockout stage	2–3	1–1	—	—	—
4	(France) Auxerre	4	1	1	2	7	7	0	4		2–2	—	0–1	—	—
5	(Serbia) Partizan	4	0	1	3	2	7	−5	1		—	—	1–1	1–4	—

===== Group G =====
Pos	Team	Pld	W	D	L	GF	GA	GD	Pts	Qualification	PAN	PSG	HTA	RAP	MLA
1	(Greece) Panathinaikos	4	2	1	1	3	4	−1	7	Advance to knockout stage	—	—	2–0	0–0	—
2	(France) Paris Saint-Germain	4	1	2	1	6	4	+2	5	Advance to knockout stage	4–0	—	2–4	—	—
3	(Israel) Hapoel Tel Aviv	4	1	2	1	7	7	0	5	Advance to knockout stage	—	—	—	2–2	1–1
4	(Romania) Rapid București	4	0	4	0	3	3	0	4		—	0–0	—	—	1–1
5	(Czech Republic) Mladá Boleslav	4	0	3	1	2	3	−1	3		0–1	0–0	—	—	—

==== Round of 32 ====
Team 1	Agg.	Team 2	1st leg	2nd leg
Hapoel Tel Aviv (Israel)	2–5	(Scotland) Rangers	2–1	0–4
CSKA Moscow (Russia)	0–1	(Israel) Maccabi Haifa	0–0	0–1

==== Last 16 ====
Team 1	Agg.	Team 2	1st leg	2nd leg
Maccabi Haifa (Israel)	0–4	(Spain) Espanyol	0–0	0–4

=== Intertoto Cup ===
==== Second round ====
Team 1	Agg.	Team 2	1st leg	2nd leg
Maccabi Petah Tikva (Israel)	4–2	(Bosnia and Herzegovina) NK Zrinjski	1–1	3–1

==== Third round ====
Team 1	Agg.	Team 2	1st leg	2nd leg
Maccabi Petah Tikva (Israel)	3–4	(Cyprus) Ethnikos Achna FC	0–2	3–2

== National Teams ==
=== National team ===
==== Euro 2008 Qualifying (Group E) ====
Pos	Team	Pld	W	D	L	GF	GA	GD	Pts	Qualification
1	Croatia	12	9	2	1	28	8	+20	29	Qualify for final tournament
2	Russia	12	7	3	2	18	7	+11	24	Qualify for final tournament
3	England	12	7	2	3	24	7	+17	23 (Note: Head-to-head points: England 4, Israel 1.)	
4	Israel	12	7	2	3	20	12	+8	23	
5	Macedonia	12	4	2	6	12	12	0	14	
6	Estonia	12	2	1	9	5	21	−16	7	
7	Andorra	12	0	0	12	2	42	−40	0	

Source: UEFA
Rules for classification: Qualification tiebreakers

==== Friendlies ====
Date	Venue	Opponents	Score	Israel scorers
15 August 2006	Celje, Slovenia	Slovenia	1–1	Yossi Benayoun
7 February 2007	Ramat-Gan, Israel	Ukraine	1–1	Walid Badir

=== Women's National Team ===
==== 2009 UEFA Women's Championship Qualifying ====
===== Preliminary round – Group 2 =====
Played in Bosnia and Herzegovina:

Team	Pld	W	D	L	GF	GA	GD	Pts
Israel	3	3	0	0	9	2	+7	9
Bosnia and Herzegovina	3	1	1	1	7	7	0	4
Armenia	3	1	1	1	2	2	0	4
Latvia	3	0	0	3	1	8	−7	0

===== Qualifying Stage – Group 6 =====
Team	Pld	W	D	L	GF	GA	GD	Pts
Norway	8	7	1	0	26	0	+26	22
Russia	8	6	1	1	25	7	+18	19
Austria	8	3	0	5	13	18	−5	9
Poland	8	2	1	5	11	20	−9	7
Israel	8	0	1	7	3	33	−30	1

=== U-21 National team ===
==== 2007 European U-21 Championship ====
===== Qualifying Groups =====
Team	Pld	W	D	L	GF	GA	GD	Pts
Israel	2	1	1	0	3	2	+1	4
Turkey	2	0	2	0	0	0	0	2
Wales	2	0	1	1	2	3	−1	1

===== Play-offs =====
Team 1	Agg.	Team 2	1st leg	2nd leg
France U-21	1–2	Israel U-21	1–1	0–1

===== 2007 European U-21 Championship (Group A) =====
Team	Pld	W	D	L	GF	GA	GD	Pts
Netherlands	3	2	1	0	5	3	+2	7
Belgium	3	1	2	0	3	2	+1	5
Portugal	3	1	1	1	5	2	+3	4
Israel	3	0	0	3	0	6	−6	0

=== U-19 National team ===
==== 2007 European U-19 Championship ====
===== 2007 European U-19 qualifying round (Group 2) =====
Team	Pld	W	D	L	GF	GA	GD	Pts
Israel	3	3	0	0	11	1	+10	9
Switzerland	3	2	0	1	6	3	+3	6
Slovenia	3	1	0	2	6	5	+1	3
Liechtenstein	3	0	0	3	0	14	−14	0

===== 2007 European U-19 elite round (Group 6) =====
Team	Pld	W	D	L	GF	GA	GD	Pts
France	3	2	0	1	6	3	+3	6
Israel	3	2	0	1	11	4	+7	6
Poland	3	1	0	2	4	8	−4	3
Slovakia	3	1	0	2	2	8	−6	3

=== U-17 National team ===
Team	Pld	W	D	L	GF	GA	GD	Pts
Poland	3	3	0	0	7	0	+7	9
Finland	3	1	1	1	5	4	+1	4
Israel	3	0	2	1	2	5	−3	2
Albania	3	0	1	2	2	7	−5	1

=== U-19 Women's National team ===
2007 European Women's U-19 Championship Qualifying
Pos	Team	Pld	W	D	L	GF	GA	GD	Pts
1	Scotland U-19	3	3	0	0	14	5	+9	9
2	Russia U-19	3	2	0	1	4	2	+2	6
3	Slovenia U-19	3	1	0	2	4	8	−4	3
4	Israel U-19	3	0	0	3	1	8	−7	0
