= 2006–07 Toto Cup Artzit =

Toto Cup Artzit
- Season: 2006–07
- Champions: Hapoel Ramat Gan (3rd title)

The 2006–07 Toto Cup Artzit was the 8th time the cup was being contested. The final was played at Haberfeld Stadium on 13 February 2007.

The winners, for the second year in a row, were Hapoel Ramat Gan, beating Sektzia Nes Tziona 1–0 in the final.

== Group stage ==
=== Group A ===
Pos	Team	Pld	W	D	L	GF	GA	GD	Pts	Qualification
1	Hapoel Ramat Gan	10	6	1	3	14	8	+6	19	Advanced to Semifinals
2	Maccabi Be'er Sheva	10	6	1	3	10	7	+3	19	Advanced to Semifinals
3	Hapoel Rishon LeZion	10	6	0	4	14	10	+4	18	
4	Maccabi Kafr Kanna	10	4	0	6	9	17	−8	12	
5	Maccabi Ironi Kiryat Ata	10	3	1	6	5	7	−2	10	
6	Maccabi HaShikma Ramat Hen	10	3	1	6	8	11	−3	10	

Source: Hapoel Ramat Gan 2006/2007 IFA (in Hebrew)
Rules for classification: 1st points; 2nd goal difference; 3rd matches won; 4th goals scored; 5th head-to-head; 6th decision match

=== Group B ===
Pos	Team	Pld	W	D	L	GF	GA	GD	Pts	Qualification
1	Sektzia Nes Tziona	10	4	3	3	14	12	+2	15	Advanced to Semifinals
2	Hapoel Bnei Tamra	10	4	3	3	12	10	+2	15	Advanced to Semifinals
3	Maccabi Ironi Tirat HaCarmel	10	4	3	3	10	10	0	15	
4	Hapoel Marmorek	10	3	5	2	10	8	+2	14	
5	Hapoel Herzliya	10	2	4	4	12	14	−2	10	
6	Beitar Shimshon Tel Aviv	10	2	4	4	15	19	−4	10	

Source: Sektzia Nes Tziona 2006/2006 IFA (in Hebrew)
Rules for classification: 1st points; 2nd goal difference; 3rd matches won; 4th goals scored; 5th head-to-head; 6th decision match

=== Semifinals ===
16 January 2007
15:00

Maccabi Be'er Sheva	0–2	Sektzia Nes Tziona
	Report	Israel 30'; Ben Haim 88'

Haberfeld Stadium, Rishon LeZion
Referee: Nir Amar

16 January 2007
17:00

Hapoel Bnei Tamra	0–0 (a.e.t.)	Hapoel Ramat Gan
	Report
Penalties
	4-5

Haberfeld Stadium, Rishon LeZion
Referee: Kiril Balikin

=== Final ===
13 February 2007
17:00

Hapoel Ramat Gan	1–0 (a.e.t.)	Sektzia Nes Tziona
Chacana 111'	Report

Haberfeld Stadium, Rishon LeZion
Referee: Roee Reinschreiber

== See also ==
- Toto Cup
- 2006–07 Liga Artzit
- 2006–07 in Israeli football
