= Avi Buchsenbaum =

Israeli footballer and manager

Avi Buchsenbaum אבי בוכסנבאום
Personal information
- Date of birth: 1953 (age 72–73)
- Place of birth: Ramat Gan, Israel

Youth career
- Hapoel Ramat Gan

Senior career*
Years	Team	Apps	(Gls)
1972–1984	Hapoel Ramat Gan	252	(6)

Managerial career
- 2001: Hapoel Ramat Gan
- * Club domestic league appearances and goals

Avi Buchsenbaum (Hebrew: אבי בוכסנבאום) is a former Israeli footballer and manager who played 13 seasons in Hapoel Ramat Gan.

His son Omer is also a footballer who plays for Hapoel Ramat Gan.
