= Hamad Ganayem =

Israeli footballer

Hamad Ganayem حمد غنايم חמד גנאים
Personal information
- Date of birth: 8 July 1987 (age 39)
- Place of birth: Sakhnin, Israel
- Position: Left midfielder

Youth career
- Bnei Sakhnin

Senior career*
Years	Team	Apps	(Gls)
2004–2016	Bnei Sakhnin	289	(26)
2016–2017	Shabab Al-Khalil	?	(?)
2017–2018	Hapoel Iksal	20	(1)
2018–2019	Hapoel Kaukab	23	(1)
2019	F.C. Daburiyya	10	(1)
2019–2020	Maccabi Tamra	21	(1)
2020–2021	Tzeirei Sakhnin	19	(7)
2021–2022	Hapoel Arraba	16	(1)

International career
2005	Israel U18	3	(0)
2005–2006	Israel U19	5	(0)
- * Club domestic league appearances and goals as of 1 November 2023

Hamad Ganayem
Medal record

Representing Israel

Football

Maccabiah Games
Gold medal – first place	2005 Maccabiah	Football

Hamad Ganayem (Arabic: حمد غنايم, Hebrew: חמד גנאים; born 8 July 1987) is an Israeli professional football (soccer) player who plays for Hapoel Arraba.
