= Omer Buchsenbaum =

Israeli footballer

Omer Buchsenbaum עומר בוקסנבוים
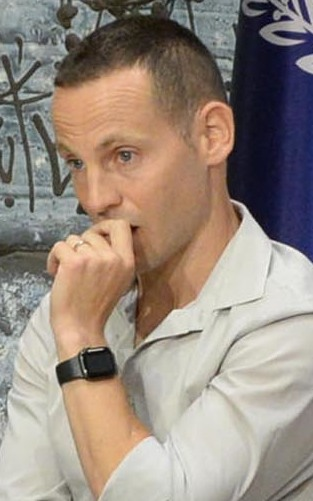
- Buchsenbaum in 2021

Personal information
- Full name: Omer Buchsenbaum
- Date of birth: 12 November 1982 (age 43)
- Place of birth: Ramat Gan, Israel
- Position: Midfielder

Team information
- Current team: Hapoel Tel Aviv

Youth career
- Hapoel Ramat Gan

Senior career*
Years	Team	Apps	(Gls)
1999–2000	Hakoah Ramat Gan	-	(-)
2000–2003	Hapoel Ramat Gan	58	(9)
2003–2004	Maccabi Haifa	3	(0)
2004–2006	Hapoel Petah Tikva	49	(5)
2006–2008	Maccabi Herzliya	60	(16)
2008–2010	Maccabi Petah Tikva	41	(4)
2010–2014	Hapoel Ramat Gan	117	(9)
- * Club domestic league appearances and goals

Omer Buchsenbaum (Hebrew: עומר בוקסנבוים; born 12 November 1982) is an Israeli former professional footballer who works as the head of youth development for Hapoel Tel Aviv.

== Career ==
After being relegated with Maccabi Herzliya to the second league, Omer Buchsenbaum transferred to Maccabi Petah Tikva where he signed a contract for two years.

He is the son of Avi Buchsenbaum, a former player of Hapoel Ramat Gan.

He retired on 29 October 2014.

== Honours ==
- Israel State Cup: 2003, 2013
- Israeli Championships: 2003–04
- Toto Cup: 2004–05, 2006–07
- Liga Leumit: 2011–12
- Toto Cup (Leumit): 2011
