= Haim Haberfeld =

Israeli trade union leader

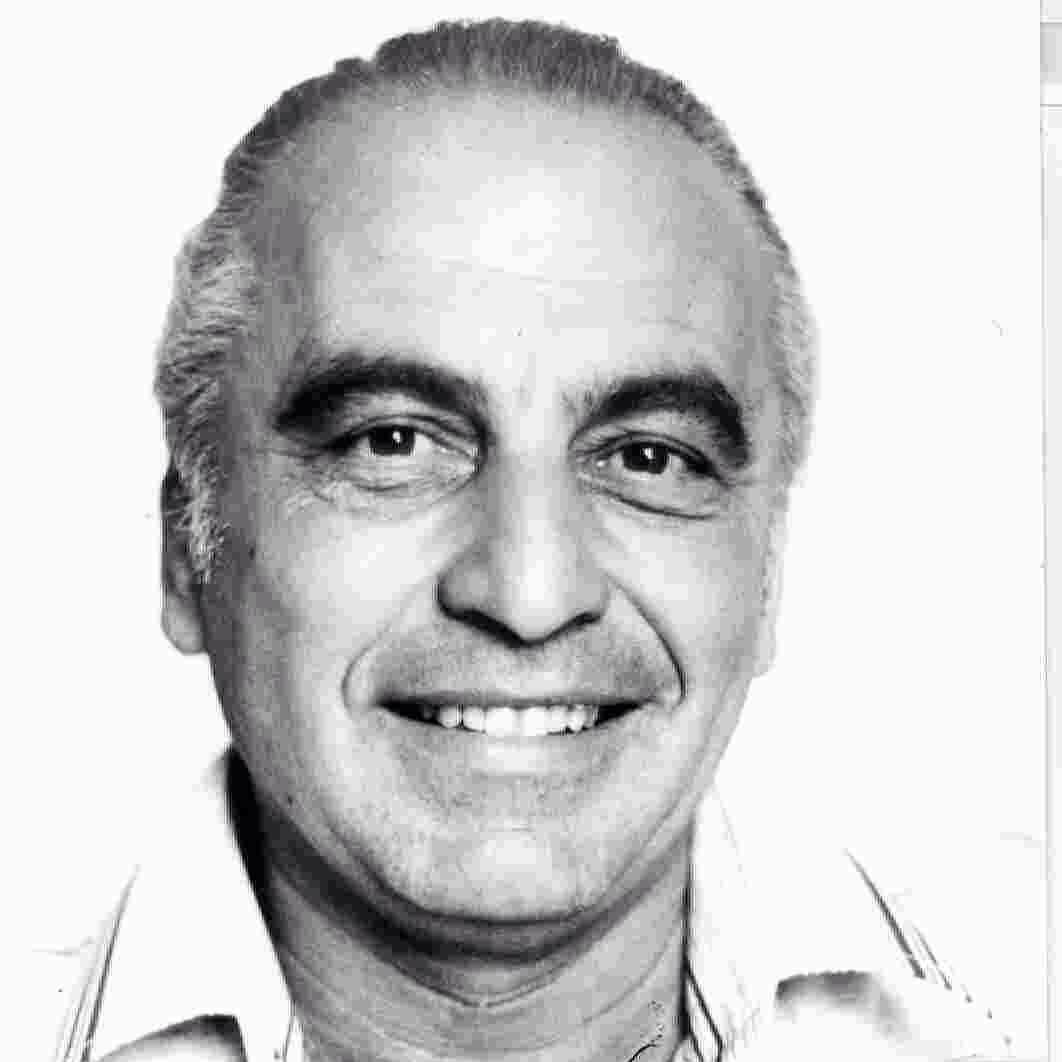
Haim Haberfeld

Haim Haberfeld (Hebrew: חיים הברפלד; 6 September 1931 – 29 January 2002) was an Israeli trade union leader and the chairman of the Israel Football Association.

== Early life and education ==
Chaim Haberfeld was born in Brno in Czechoslovakia. His family immigrated to Israel in the Fifth Aliyah. He arrived in Rishon Le Zion at the age of two. Haberfeld studied at the Ben Shemen Youth Village and served in the 1948 Arab–Israeli War in the Artillery Corps.

== Union leader ==
After his discharge, Haberfeld became a civilian IDF employee in Tzrifin. Here he met his future wife, Sima Eisen, and began his activities as a labor union activist in the IDF Worker Union, affiliated with the Histadrut. He advanced in the Histadrut hierarchy and eventually led the Histadrut Trade Union Division. In 1992, when Yisrael Kessar was appointed Minister of Transportation, he replaced him as the Histadrut Secretary General, winning internal elections in the Israeli Labor Party against Amir Peretz.

During Haberfeld's leadership, the financial situation of the Histadrut and Kupat Holim Clalit was on the brink of bankruptcy, after it accumulated huge deficits. The proportion of those paying the uniform tax to the Histadrut had decreased. The position of the Histadrut in public opinion was at a low ebb.

In 1994, Haim Ramon decided to compete against Haberfeld for the post of Secretary General of the Histadrut, with the aim of carrying out a comprehensive reform of the Histadrut. Despite the support of the Labor Party for Haberfeld, Ramon's party "A new life in the Histadrut" won the election. One of the reasons for Haberfeld's failure was the perception that Haberfeld was a gray party apparatus person, in contrast to Ramon, who was considered a rising star in politics. Supporters of Haberfeld were impressed by his modest lifestyle, however, when Haberfeld and Kessar's finance person, Artur Yisraelovitch, was convicted of various offenses, Judge Zecharia Caspi emphasized in his decision that the Histadrut at the time was "corrupt and corrupting".

== Football, death, and legacy ==
Haberfeld served as the chairman of the Israeli Football Association from 1980 to 1985 and again from 1992 to 1993.

Haberfeld died in 2002. The home field of Hapoel Rishon LeZion (built 1993) was renamed the Haberfeld Stadium in 2003.
