= Shlomi Hanuka =

Israeli footballer

Shlomi Hanuka שלומי חנוכה
Personal information
- Full name: Shlomi Hanuka
- Date of birth: 15 August 1985 (age 41)
- Place of birth: Haifa, Israel
- Position: Midfielder

Youth career
- Maccabi Haifa

Senior career*
Years	Team	Apps	(Gls)
2006–2007	Hapoel Acre	17	(0)
2007–2008	Hapoel Nazareth Illit	15	(2)
2008–2010	Maccabi Ahi Nazareth	53	(0)
2010–2011	Hapoel Herzliya	29	(0)
2011–2012	Maccabi Ironi Bat Yam	32	(0)
2012–2017	Hapoel Afula	163	(8)
2017–2018	Hapoel Petah Tikva	17	(0)
2018	Maccabi Ahi Nazareth	15	(0)
2018–2019	Hapoel Migdal HaEmek	26	(1)
2019–2020	Hapoel Iksal	18	(2)
- * Club domestic league appearances and goals

Shlomo "Shlomi" Hanuka (Hebrew: שלומי חנוכה; born 15 August 1985) is an Israeli association football midfielder. He previously played for Maccabi Ahi Nazareth, Hapoel Petah Tikva and Hapoel Acre, Hapoel Afula.
