= 2007 UEFA European Under-21 Championship qualification play-offs =

Football tournament qualification stage

The play-off first legs were played on 6–7 October 2006, while the second legs were played on 10–11 October 2006. Winners of play-off round qualified to the championship played the following year in June, where Netherlands was chosen to host the tournament.

== Matches ==
Team 1	Agg.	Team 2	1st leg	2nd leg
Serbia	5–3	Sweden	0–3	5–0
Czech Republic	3–2	Bosnia and Herzegovina	2–1	1–1
Russia	4–4 (a)	Portugal	4–1	0–3
England	3–0	Germany	1–0	2–0
Italy	2–1	Spain	0–0	2–1
Belgium	5–2	Bulgaria	1–1	4–1
France	1–2	Israel	1–1	0–1

== First leg ==
6 October 2006
15:00

Serbia	0 – 3	Sweden
	Report	Đurić 4', 9'; Holmén 73'

Stadion Vojvodine, Novi Sad
Attendance: 4,266
Referee: Stéphane Lannoy (France)

6 October 2006
16:00

Russia	4 – 1	Portugal
Denisov 5', 90' (pen.); Nababkin 47'; Savin 63'	Report	Machado 12'

Eduard Streltsov Stadium, Moscow
Attendance: 13,200
Referee: Costas Kapitanis (Cyprus)

6 October 2006
17:30

Czech Republic	2 – 1	Bosnia and Herzegovina
Kolář 33'; Hubník 70'	Report	Salihović 53'

Stadion Střelnice, Jablonec nad Nisou
Attendance: 4,550
Referee: Pedro Proença (Portugal)

6 October 2006
21:00

England	1 – 0	Germany
Baines 77'	Report

Ricoh Arena, Coventry
Attendance: 30,919
Referee: Matteo Trefoloni (Italy)

6 October 2006
21:00

Italy	0 – 0	Spain
	Report

Stadio Alberto Braglia, Modena
Attendance: 9,875
Referee: Darko Čeferin (Slovenia)

7 October 2006
18:00

Belgium	1 – 1	Bulgaria
Legear 74'	Report	Genkov 89' (pen.)

Schiervelde Stadion, Roeselare
Attendance: 1,706
Referee: Craig Alexander Thomson (Scotland)

7 October 2006
21:00

France	1 – 1	Israel
Zubar 79'	Report	Sahar 50'

Stade Michel d'Ornano, Caen
Attendance: 12,235
Referee: Howard Webb (England)

== Second leg ==
10 October 2006
17:00

Bosnia and Herzegovina	1 – 1	Czech Republic
Salihović 52'	Report	Frejlach 82'

Koševo Stadium, Sarajevo
Attendance: 7,000
Referee: Serge Gumienny (Belgium)

Czech Republic won 3–2 on aggregate

10 October 2006
19:15

Sweden	0 – 5	Serbia
	Report	Mrđa 9'; Janković 11'; Babović 35', 59'; Krasić 66'

Edsborgs IP, Trollhättan
Attendance: 9,102
Referee: Knut Kircher (Germany)

Serbia won 5–3 on aggregate

10 October 2006
20:15

Germany	0 – 2	England
	Report	Walcott 85', 90+2'

BayArena, Leverkusen
Attendance: 20,800
Referee: Jaroslav Jára (Czech Republic)

England won 3–0 on aggregate

10 October 2006
20:30

Spain	1 – 2	Italy
Soldado 60'	Report	Chiellini 25'; Montolivo 35'

Estadio Nueva Balastera, Palencia
Attendance: 8,500
Referee: Gerald Lehner (Austria)

Italy won 2–1 on aggregate

10 October 2006
22:00

Portugal	3 – 0	Russia
Moutinho 32' (pen.); Djaló 66'; Taranov 72' (o.g.)	Report

Estàdio Dr. Jorge Sampaio, Vila Nova de Gaia
Attendance: 7,350
Referee: Pieter Vink (Netherlands)

4–4 on aggregate, Portugal won on away goals rule

11 October 2006
17:00

Bulgaria	1 – 4	Belgium
Genkov 56'	Report	De Smet 19', 78'; Martens 36' (pen.); Legear 87'

Balgarska Armiya Stadium, Sofia
Attendance: 8,000
Referee: Carlos Megía Dávila (Spain)

Belgium won 5–2 on aggregate

11 October 2006
18:30

Israel	1 – 0	France
Taga 90+3'	Report

Herzliya Municipal Stadium, Herzliya
Attendance: 7,000
Referee: Oleh Oriekhov (Ukraine)

Israel won 2–1 on aggregate
