= Haberfeld Stadium =

Football stadium in Rishon LeZion

Coordinates: 31°58′30″N 34°45′10″E

- Superland Stadium
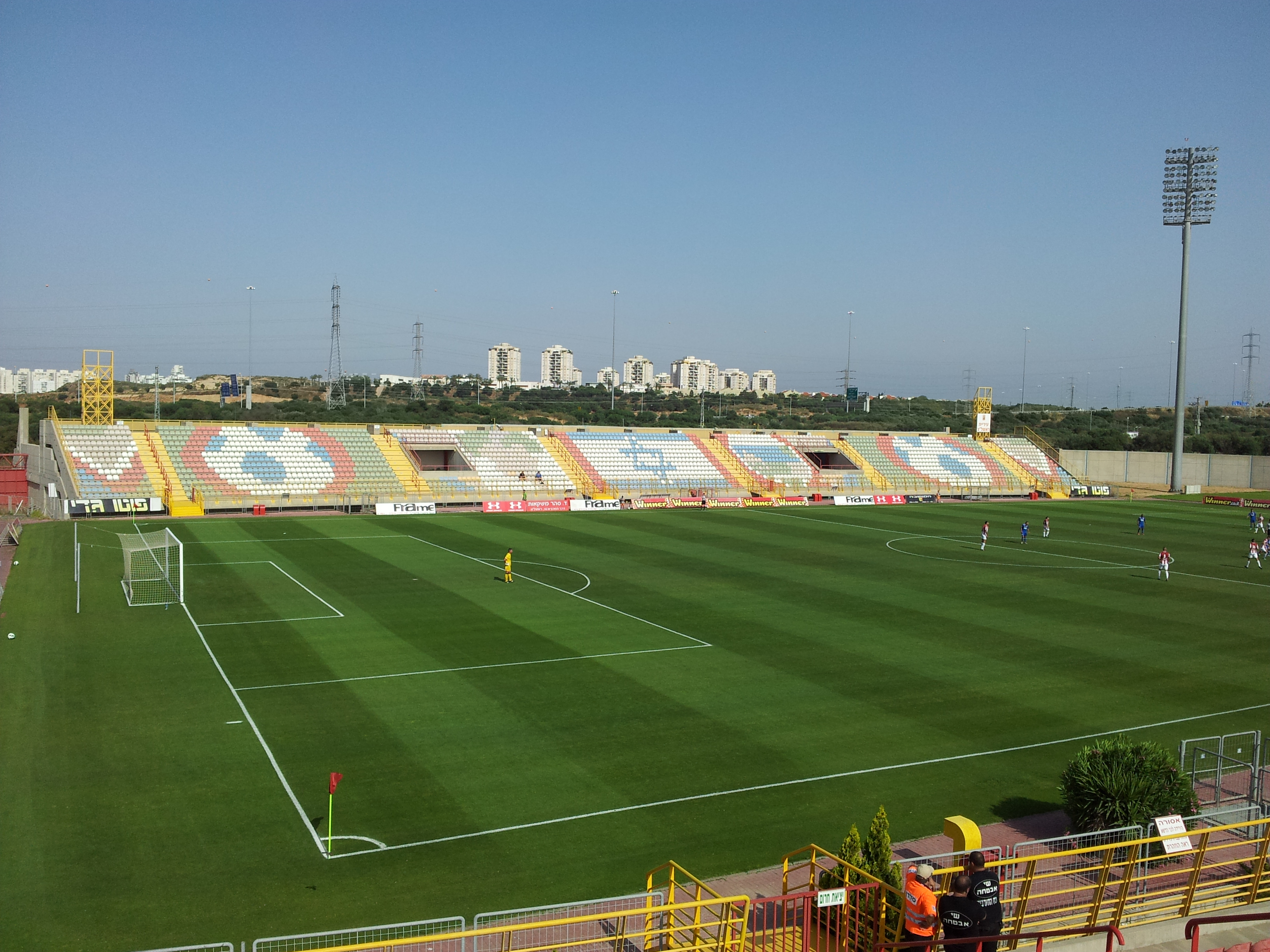
- Interactive map of Haberfeld Stadium
- Former names: The Municipal Stadium (1993-2003)
- Location: Rishon LeZion, Israel
- Owner: Municipality of Rishon LeZion
- Operator: Municipality of Rishon LeZion
- Capacity: 6,000 (All-seater)
- Surface: Grass

Construction
- Groundbreaking: 1993
- Opened: 1995
- Cost: ₪32 million
- Architects: Goldsmith, Arditi and Ben Naim Architects
- Project manager: Minrav

Tenant
- Hapoel Rishon LeZion F.C.

Haberfeld Stadium (Hebrew: אצטדיון הברפלד, Itztadion Haberfeld; also known as the Superland Stadium) is a multi-purpose stadium in Rishon LeZion, Israel. It is currently used mostly for football matches and is the home stadium of Hapoel Rishon LeZion. The stadium holds 6,000 and was built in 1993.

The stadium is named after the late Israel Football Association chairman Haim Haberfeld.

== Gallery ==
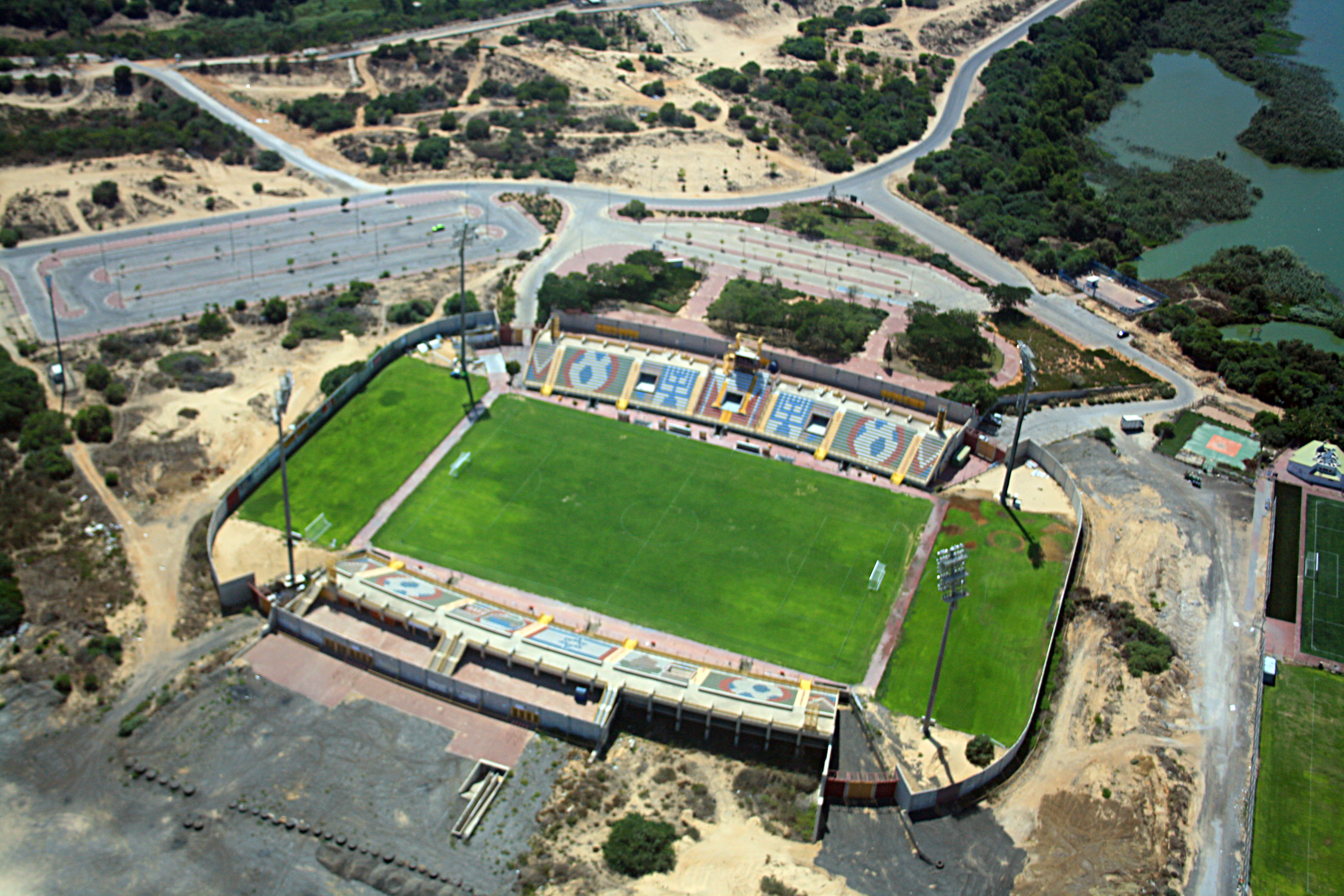

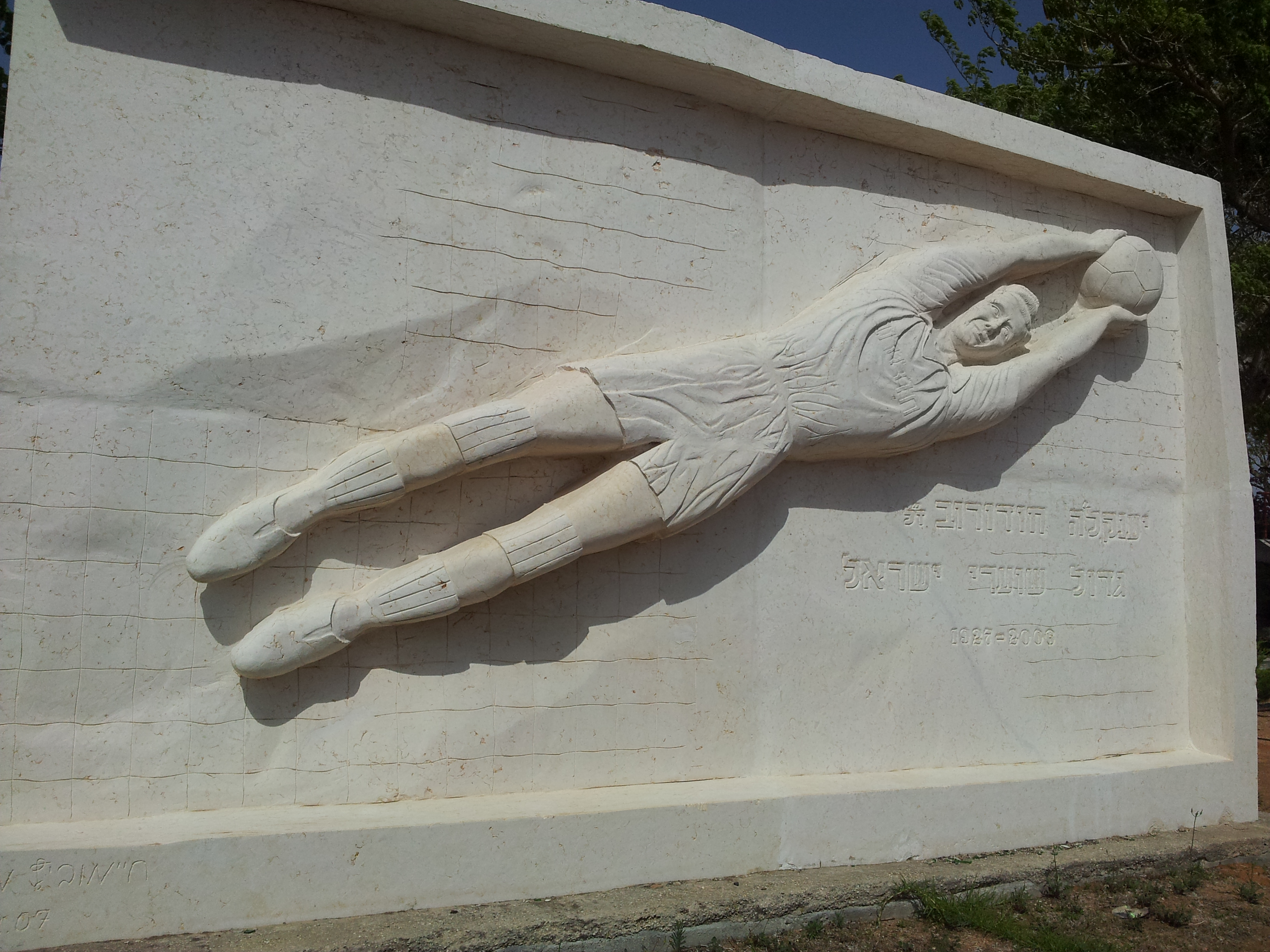

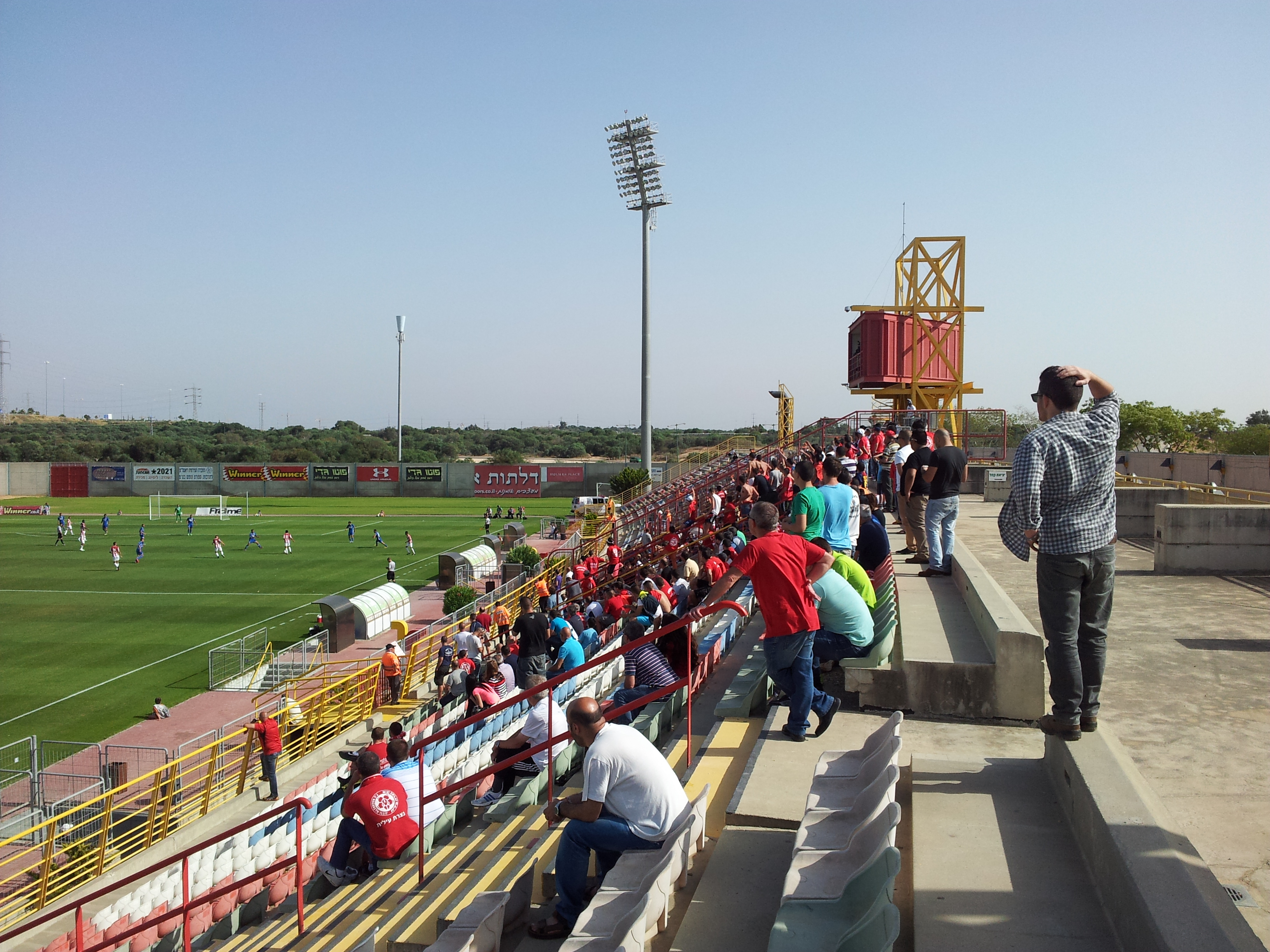

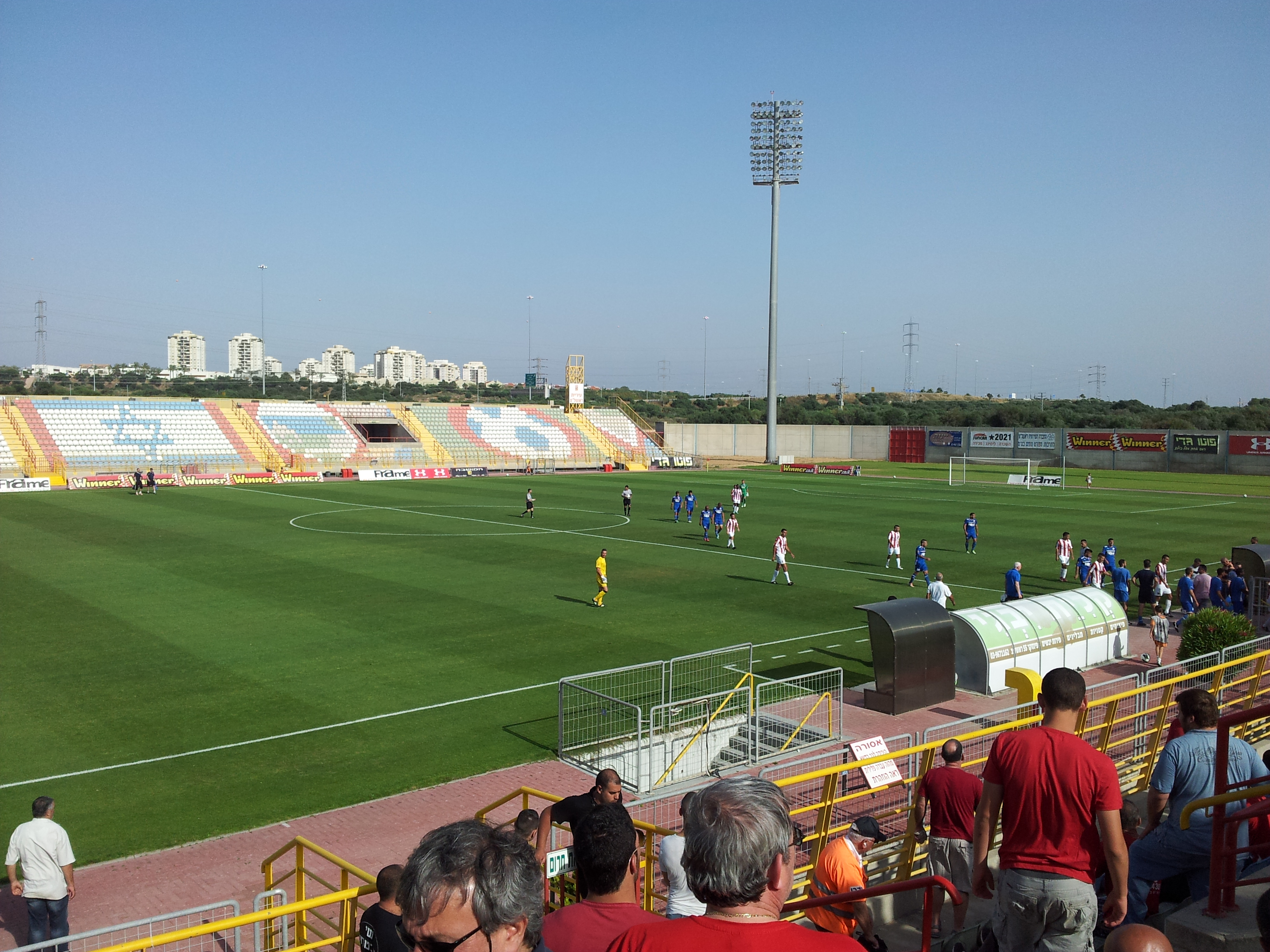

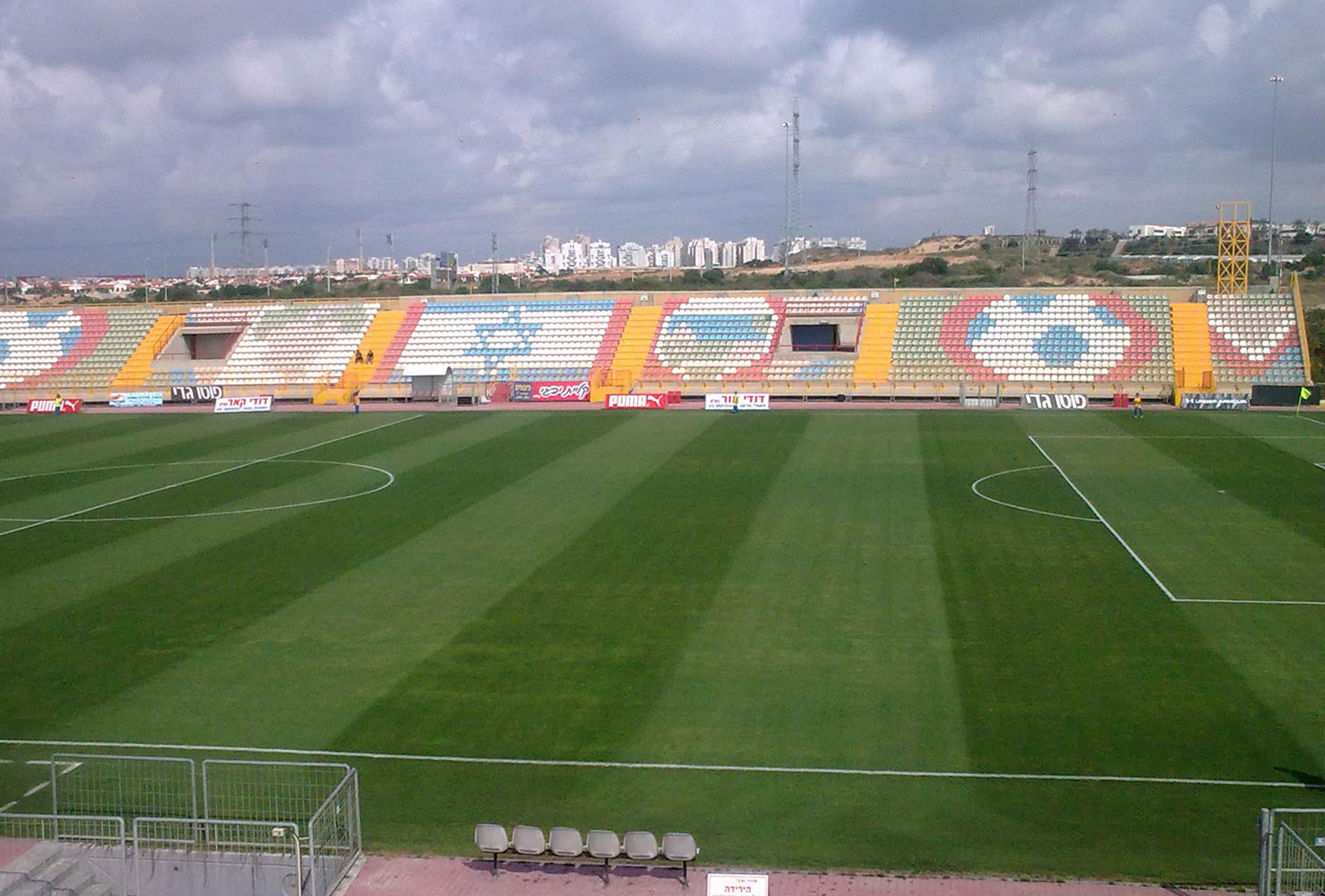

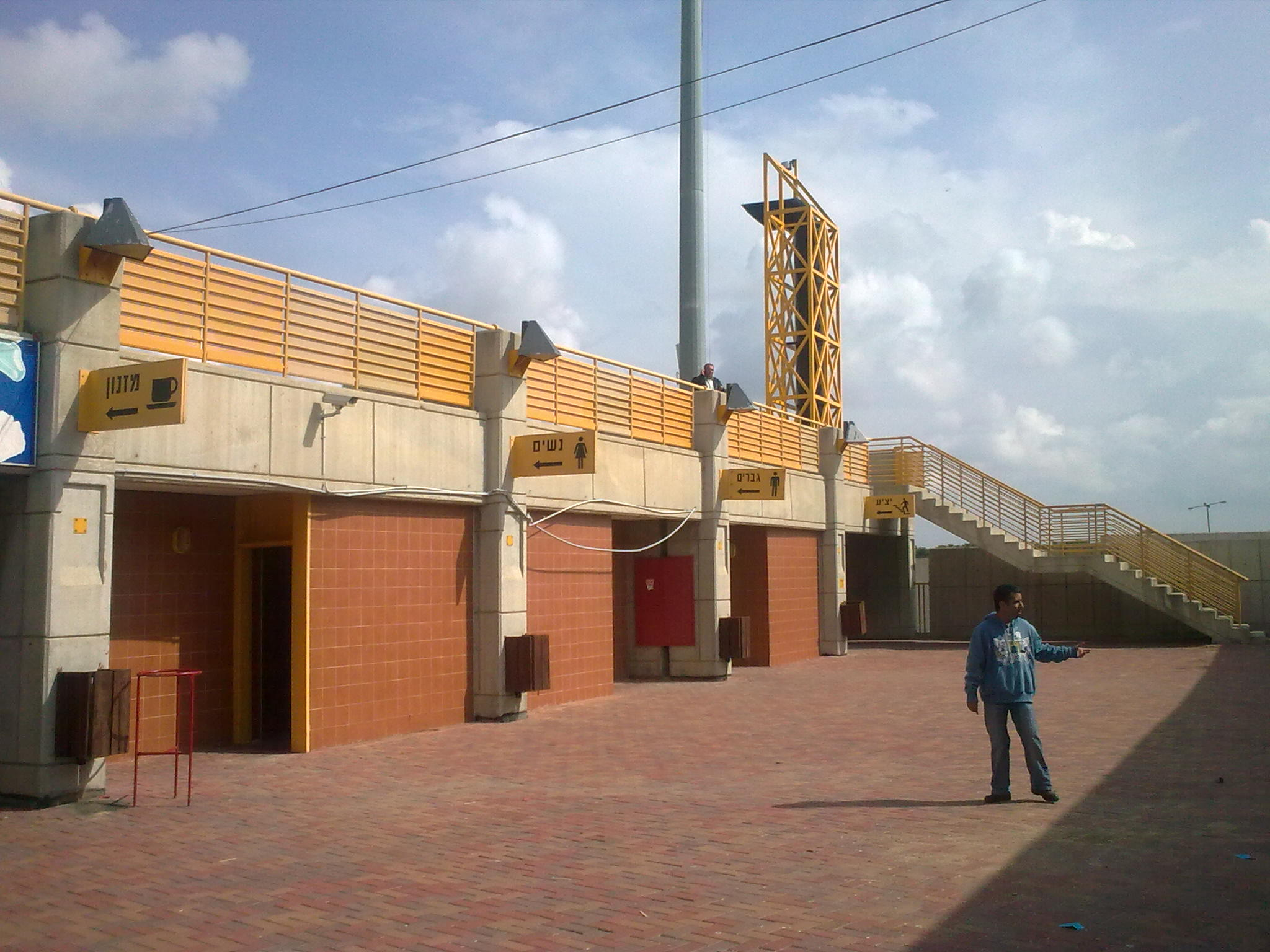

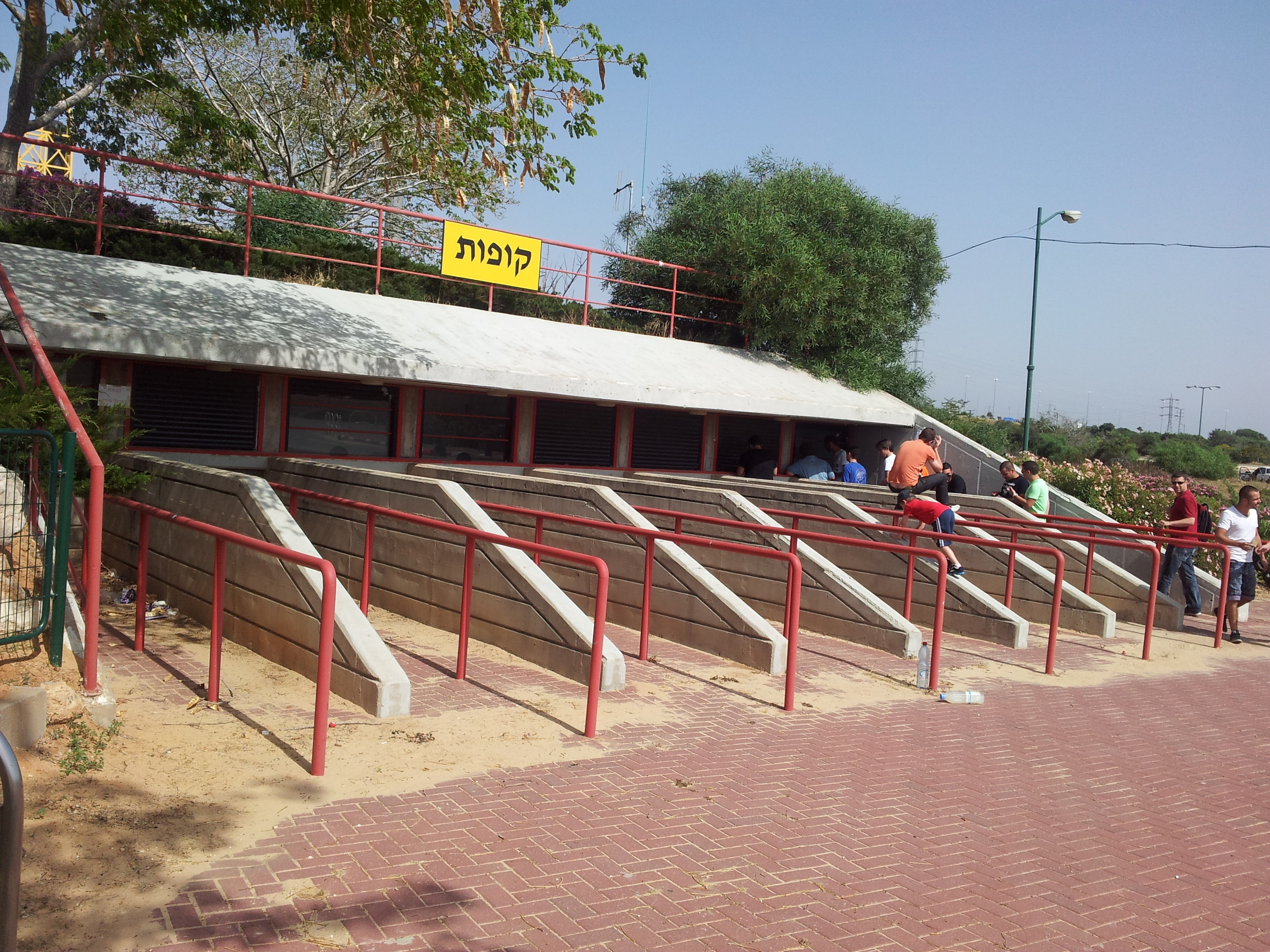
