= Gullotta =

Gullotta is a surname. Notable people with the surname include:

- José Luis Martínez Gullotta (born 1984), Argentine football player
- Leo Gullotta (born 1946), Italian actor
