= 2014 FIFA World Cup final =

World Cup final, held in Brazil

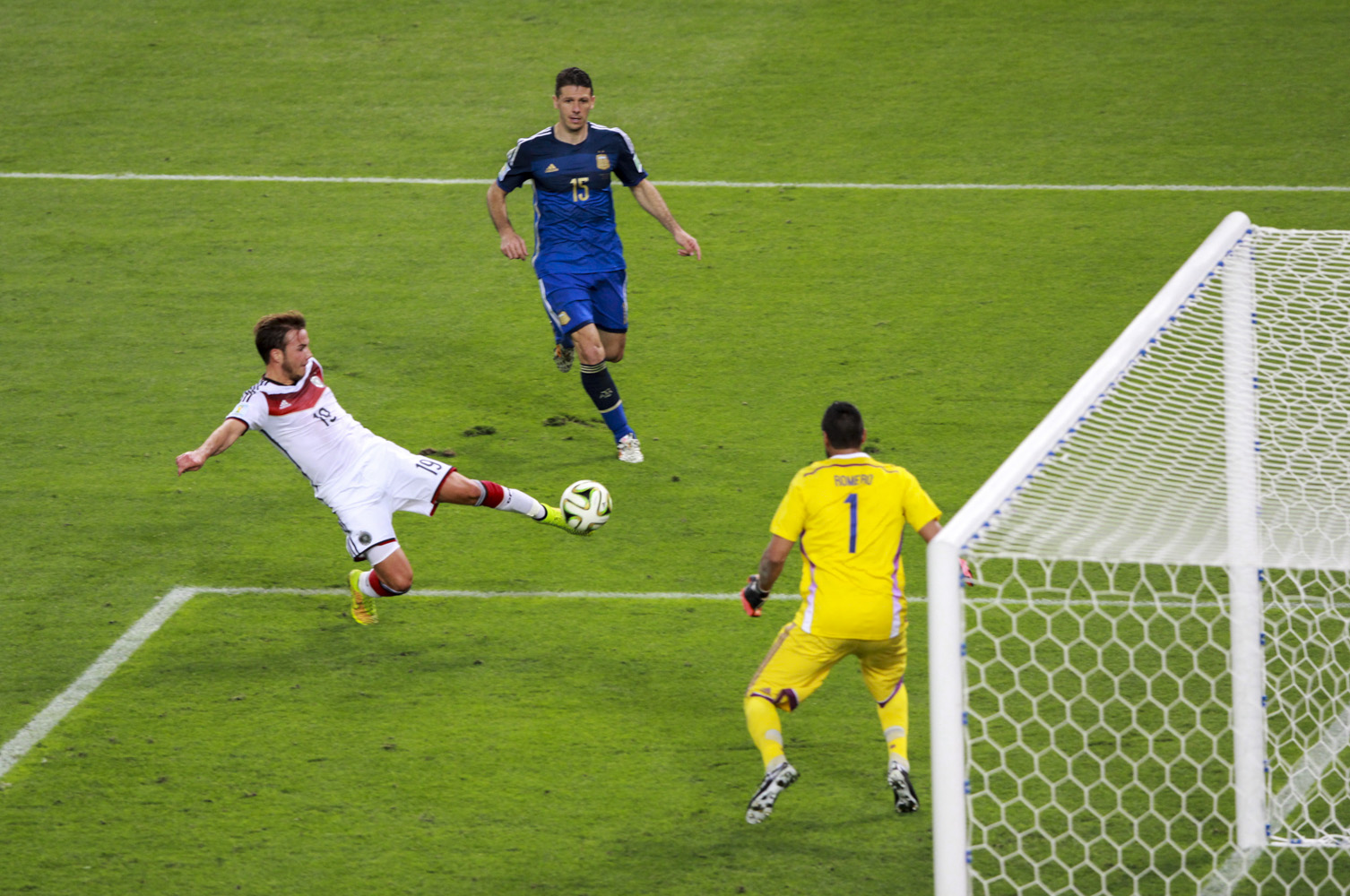
- Germany's Mario Götze scores the match-winning goal
- Event: 2014 FIFA World Cup
Germany	Argentina
1	0
- After extra time
- Date: 13 July 2014
- Venue: Maracanã Stadium, Rio de Janeiro
- Man of the Match: Mario Götze (Germany)
- Referee: Nicola Rizzoli (Italy)
- Attendance: 74,738
- Weather: Fair; 23 °C (73 °F); 65% humidity

The final match of the 2014 FIFA World Cup, the 20th edition of FIFA's competition for national football teams, was played at the Maracanã Stadium in Rio de Janeiro, Brazil, on 13 July 2014, and was contested by Germany and Argentina.

The event comprised hosts Brazil and 31 other teams who emerged from the qualification phase, organised by the six FIFA confederations. The 32 teams competed in a group stage, from which 16 teams qualified for the knockout stage. En route to the final, Germany finished first in Group G, with two wins and a draw, after which they defeated Algeria in the round of 16, France in the quarter-final and Brazil, by a score of 7–1, in the semi-final. Argentina finished first in Group F with three wins, before defeating Switzerland in the round of 16, Belgium in the quarter-final and the Netherlands in a penalty shoot-out in the semi-final. The final was witnessed by 74,738 spectators in the stadium, as well as over a billion watching on television, with the referee for the match being Nicola Rizzoli from Italy.

Gonzalo Higuaín missed a chance to score for Argentina in the first half when he was one-on-one with Germany goalkeeper Manuel Neuer, and Benedikt Höwedes failed to give Germany the lead shortly before half-time when his shot struck the goalpost. Lionel Messi had an opportunity to score when he was one-on-one with Neuer shortly after half time, but his low shot went wide of the goal. On 71 minutes, Thomas Müller was through on goal following a build-up involving André Schürrle and Mesut Özil, but he failed to control the ball and lost it to Argentina's goalkeeper, Sergio Romero. With the match goalless after 90 minutes, it went to extra time, in the second period of which Germany broke the deadlock. Mario Götze, who had come on as a substitute shortly before the end of normal time, received Schürrle's cross from the left on his chest before volleying a left-footed shot into the net to secure a 1–0 victory for Germany.

Germany's win was their fourth World Cup title and the first since German reunification, as well as the first World Cup win by a European team in the Americas. Götze was named the man of the match, and Messi was awarded the Golden Ball as FIFA's outstanding player of the tournament. Germany's manager, Joachim Löw, labelled his side's win as the culmination of a project that had begun ten years previously under his predecessor Jürgen Klinsmann, and praised his team's spirit. His Argentine counterpart, Alejandro Sabella, thought his team had been unlucky to lose, and called his players "warriors". Germany failed to defend their trophy at the subsequent 2018 World Cup in Russia, becoming the third successive World Cup holders to be eliminated in the group phase after defeats against Mexico and South Korea. As of 2026, this was the last World Cup knockout stage match won by Germany after successive group stage eliminations in the 2018 and 2022 World Cups and their loss on penalties against Paraguay in the 2026 World Cup Round of 32.

== Background ==
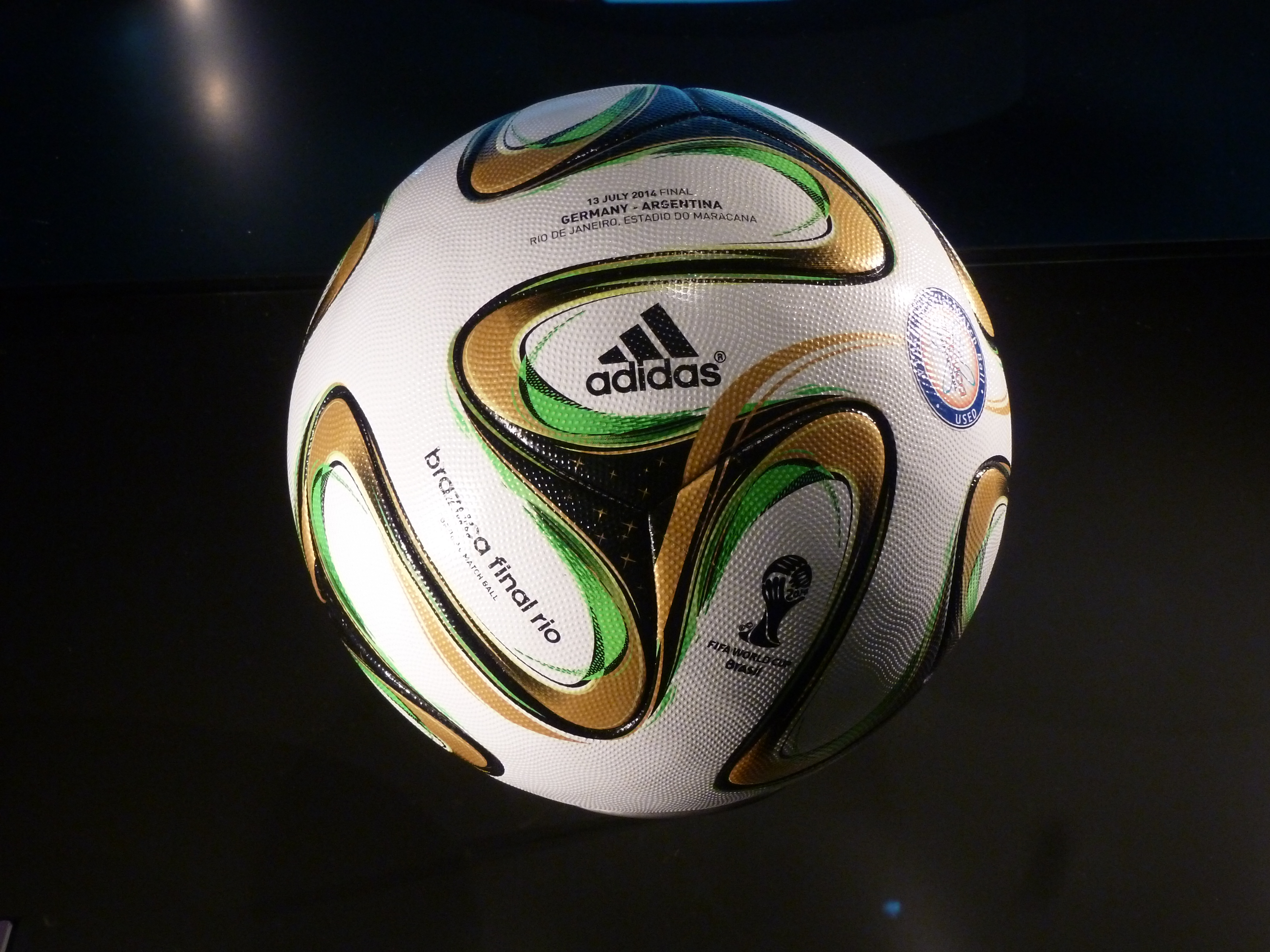
The Adidas Brazuca Final Rio used in the match

The 2014 FIFA World Cup was the 20th edition of the World Cup, FIFA's football competition for national teams, held in Brazil between 12 June and 13 July 2014. Brazil qualified for the finals automatically as tournament hosts, and 203 teams competed for the remaining 31 spots through qualifying rounds organised by the six FIFA confederations and held between June 2011 and November 2013. In the finals, the teams were divided into eight groups of four with each team playing each other once in a round-robin format. The two top teams from each group advanced to a knock-out phase. The defending champions from the 2010 World Cup were Spain, who had achieved three successive victories in major tournaments, having also won the UEFA European Championship in 2008 and 2012. They were eliminated in the group stage this year.

Germany had won the title three times before as West Germany – in 1954, 1974 and 1990. Argentina had two titles, in 1978 and 1986. The two sides had met each other six times previously in the World Cup, including in the 1986 final, which Argentina won 3–2, and the 1990 final, which West Germany won 1–0. They had met in the quarter-final of both of the most recent two World Cups, Germany winning both – a 4–2 penalty shoot-out win in 2006 and a 4–0 win in 2010. Germany then lost in the semi-finals and finished third on both occasions. The most recent meeting between the two teams before the 2014 World Cup was a friendly match played on 15 August 2012 at Commerzbank-Arena in Frankfurt, which was won by Argentina 3–1.

The venue for the final was announced in 2011 as the Estádio Jornalista Mário Filho in Rio de Janeiro, commonly known as the Maracanã Stadium. It was built in preparation for the 1950 FIFA World Cup, and that tournament's final match, in which Uruguay beat Brazil 2–1 to win the trophy, is as of 2021 the record-holder for the highest attendance at any football match in history. (Note: Guinness World Records state that the official crowd for the game was 173,850, but note that with illegal entrants included, who were not recorded, the figure could have been as high as 210,000.) The Maracanã also hosted the finals of the Copa América in 1989, 2019 and 2021; the 2013 FIFA Confederations Cup final; and both the men's and women's football finals at the 2016 Summer Olympics. The stadium underwent an extensive rebuild before the 2014 World Cup, after which its capacity was 78,838.

The match ball for the 2014 FIFA World Cup final, announced on 29 May 2014, was a variation of the Adidas Brazuca named the Adidas Brazuca Final Rio. Though the technical aspects of the ball were the same, the design was different from the Brazuca balls used in the group phase and prior knockout games, with a green, gold and black coloring. It was the third ball released specifically for FIFA World Cup final matches, after the Teamgeist Berlin (2006) and the Jo'bulani (2010).

== Route to the final ==
=== Germany ===
Germany's route to the final
	Opponent	Result
1	Portugal	4–0
2	Ghana	2–2
3	United States	1–0
R16	Algeria	2–1 (a.e.t.)
QF	France	1–0
SF	Brazil	7–1

Germany were drawn in Group G for the World Cup, in which they were joined by Ghana, Portugal and the United States. Their first match was against Portugal, on 16 June 2014 at the Itaipava Arena Fonte Nova in Salvador. Germany won a penalty on 10 minutes, when João Pereira fouled Mario Götze. Müller took the kick and gave Germany the lead. Mats Hummels added a second goal with a header on 32 minutes, and Portugal's Pepe was shown a red card five minutes later, after he headbutted Müller. Müller then scored his second in injury time to give Germany a 3–0 half-time lead. Müller scored a third from close range in the second half, to complete a 4–0 victory, after Rui Patrício had failed to clear a cross by André Schürrle. Germany's second game was against Ghana at the Estádio Castelão in Fortaleza. After a goalless first half, Götze opened the scoring on 51 minutes, when his headed shot from a Müller cross bounced off his own knee and past Ghana's goalkeeper Fatau Dauda. Ghana equalised shortly afterwards, through an André Ayew header, and then took the lead when Sulley Muntari found Asamoah Gyan with a pass, after an error by Manuel Neuer. Germany levelled the game again on 71 minutes, when Miroslav Klose, who had come on as a substitute, kicked Benedikt Höwedes's goal-bound header into the goal from close range. Klose's goal equalled the Brazilian Ronaldo's World Cup record of 15 goals, and the game finished 2–2. Germany's last group game was against the United States at Itaipava Arena Pernambuco in Recife, with a win or draw needed to guarantee qualification. In rainy conditions, Müller scored the only goal of the game with a shot inside the penalty area after goalkeeper Tim Howard had saved Per Mertesacker's header. Germany qualified as group winners.

Germany's opponents in the round of 16 were Algeria, with the match played on 30 June at the Estádio Beira-Rio in Porto Alegre. The game was tied at 0–0 after 90 minutes, Germany being described by BBC Sport's David Ornstein as looking frequently "rattled" as "Algeria wasted a succession of chances in an opening, exciting encounter". Germany took the lead early in extra time, when Müller crossed from the left and Schürrle scored from close range. Mesut Özil added a second for Germany in the final minute of extra time, before Abdelmoumene Djabou pulled a goal back for Algeria with a volley in injury time. Germany held on to record a 2–1 win. They then faced France in the quarter-final at the Maracanã Stadium on 4 July. Hummels gave Germany the lead on 12 minutes with a header, following a free kick by Toni Kroos, and that proved to be the only goal of what Ornstein described as a "comfortable" win. Germany faced tournament hosts Brazil in their semi-final game, on 8 July in Belo Horizonte. In a result described by BBC Sport's Phil McNulty in 2019 as "a drama ... that will never be forgotten by anyone who witnessed it", Germany won the game 7–1, inflicting Brazil's first competitive defeat at home for 39 years. They took the lead on 10 minutes, when Müller scored from a corner, unmarked by any Brazil players. They doubled their lead on 22 minutes through Klose, with his record-breaking 16th World Cup goal, before Kroos made it 3–0 on 25 minutes with a left-footed volley. Kroos scored again 179 seconds later, from an assist by Sami Khedira, before Khedira himself scored to make it 5–0 at half time. Schürrle scored twice in the second half to make it 7–0, before Oscar scored Brazil's sole goal shortly before the end. Simon Burnton of The Guardian later described Germany's play as being "of a savagery unwitnessed against significant opposition in the tournament's history". Germany progressed to their eighth final, 12 years after their last and their second since German reunification. (Note: German reunification took place in October 1990, a few months after West Germany's victory in the 1990 World Cup.)

=== Argentina ===
Argentina's route to the final
	Opponent	Result
1	Bosnia and Herzegovina	2–1
2	Iran	1–0
3	Nigeria	3–2
R16	Switzerland	1–0 (a.e.t.)
QF	Belgium	1–0
SF	Netherlands	0–0 (a.e.t.) (4–2 p)

Argentina were drawn in Group F, alongside Bosnia and Herzegovina, Iran and Nigeria. Their opening game took place on 15 June 2014 against Bosnia and Herzegovina, who were making their World Cup debut. It was the first game of the tournament at the Maracanã Stadium. Argentina took the lead on 3 minutes, when Bosnian defender Sead Kolašinac scored an own goal after a free kick by Lionel Messi had been flicked on by Marcos Rojo. In the second half, Messi scored himself to double Argentina's lead with a powerful shot following a one-two with Gonzalo Higuaín. Vedad Ibišević scored for Bosnia and Herzegovina with 6 minutes remaining, but Argentina held on for a 2–1 win. Their second game was against Iran at the Estádio Mineirão in Belo Horizonte on 21 June. Barney Ronay of The Guardian described Iran as producing a "stirring performance against an Argentina team of all the attacking talents", and the match remained goalless until the 90th minute. Argentina took the win in injury time, when Messi scored a left-footed shot into the corner from outside the penalty area to seal qualification for the next round with a game to spare. Their final group game was on 25 June, against Nigeria in Porto Alegre. Messi gave Argentina the lead on 3 minutes, scoring on the rebound after Ángel Di María's shot hit the goalpost. Ahmed Musa equalised for Nigeria a minute later with a right-footed curling shot, before Messi gave Argentina the lead again with a free kick from 25 yards (23 m) out shortly before half time. Musa equalised once again 2 minutes into the second half, hitting the ball past goalkeeper Sergio Romero after a one-two with Emmanuel Emenike, but Rojo scored with his knee 3 minutes later to seal a 3–2 win and first place in the final group table.

Argentina's round-of-16 opponents were Switzerland, on 1 July at the Arena Corinthians in São Paulo. Argentina had the majority of the possession during the game, but BBC Sport's Jonathan Jurejko labelled their play "unconvincing", citing their failure to break down a Switzerland side who were playing defensively. There were no goals during normal time, and it remained 0–0 until 2 minutes before the end of extra time when Messi set up Di María to score the winner past Swiss goalkeeper Diego Benaglio. Substitute Blerim Džemaili almost equalised for Switzerland immediately afterwards with a shot that hit the goalpost, but Argentina held on for a 1–0 win. Their quarter-final was against Belgium at the Estádio Nacional Mané Garrincha in Brasília on 5 July. Argentina scored the only goal of the game on 8 minutes through Higuaín, who scored from the edge of the penalty area after Di María's pass was deflected off Belgium's Jan Vertonghen. Argentina played the Netherlands in the semi-final on 9 July. There were no goals in the game, in either normal time or extra time, in what McNulty described as "120 tedious ... minutes that were in stark contrast to the spectacular shock" of the previous day's semi-final between Brazil and Germany. Ron Vlaar of the Netherlands took the first penalty, a low shot to the right, which was saved by Romero. The next three kicks, by Messi, Arjen Robben and Ezequiel Garay, were all scored, before Romero made another save, diving to his right to keep out a high penalty from Wesley Sneijder. Sergio Agüero, Dirk Kuyt and Maxi Rodríguez all scored their penalties, giving Argentina a 4–2 shoot-out win. The press in Argentina called Romero's two saves the "hands of God", a reference to the "hand of God" goal scored by Diego Maradona in 1986. Argentina progressed to their fifth final, which was also their first since 1990.

== Match ==
=== Pre-match ===
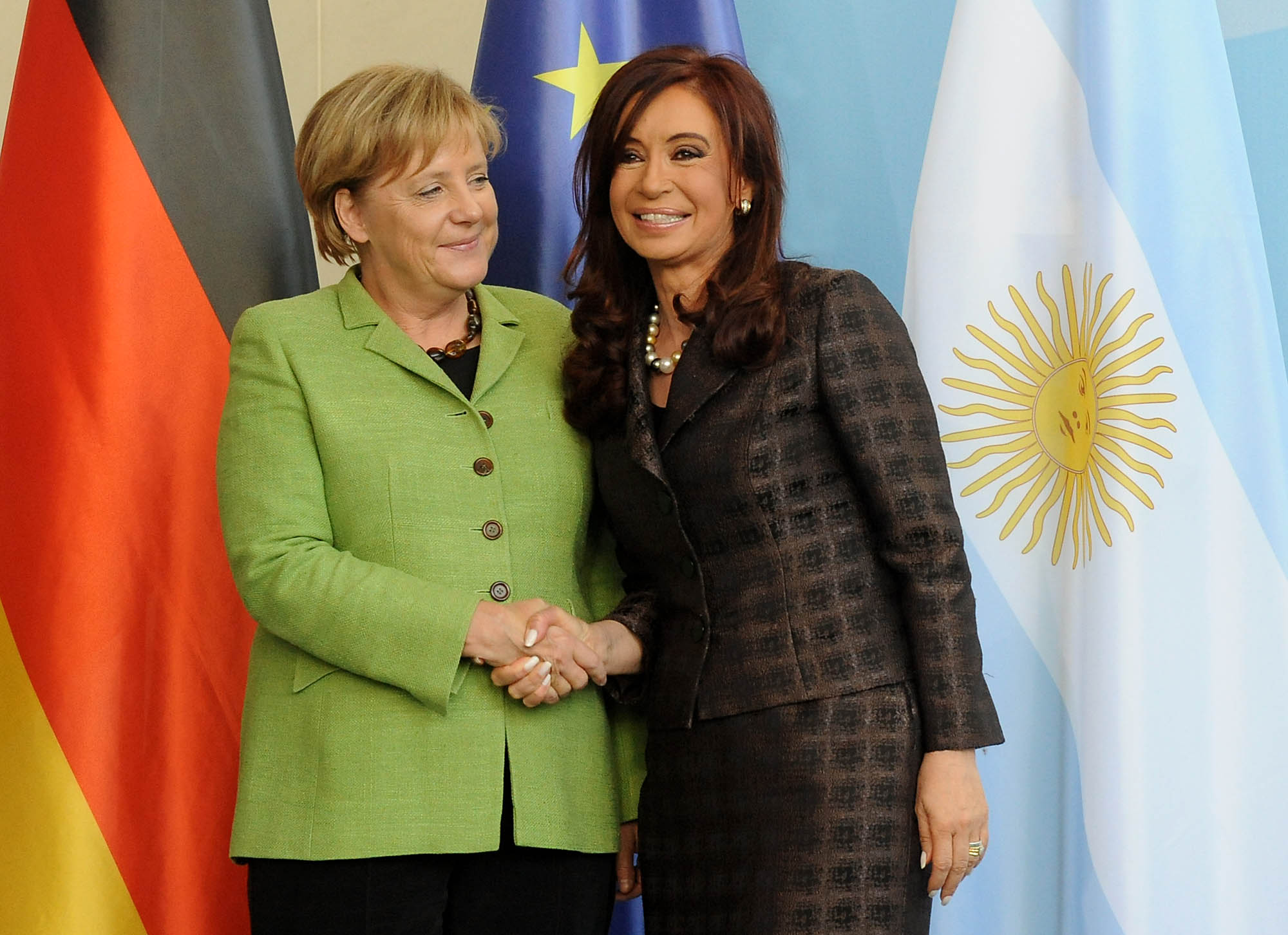
Chancellor of Germany Angela Merkel (left) attended the final. President of Argentina Cristina Fernández de Kirchner (right) did not attend due to her grandson's birthday and a case of pharyngo-laryngitis.

Nicola Rizzoli, from Italy, was named as the referee of the final, together with fellow Italians Renato Faverani and Andrea Stefani as the assistant referees, and Carlos Vera and Christian Lescano from Ecuador as the fourth and fifth officials. Earlier in the 2014 World Cup, Rizzoli took charge of the Spain–Netherlands and Nigeria–Argentina matches in the group stage, and the Argentina–Belgium quarter-final. He had previously taken charge of the 2010 UEFA Europa League final and the 2013 UEFA Champions League final. He was also one of the referees at the 2011 FIFA Club World Cup, UEFA Euro 2012 and the 2013 FIFA U-20 World Cup. He became the third Italian referee to take charge of a World Cup final, after Sergio Gonella in 1978 and Pierluigi Collina in 2002.

A closing ceremony for the World Cup took place about an hour and forty minutes before the final. A performance of two acts, the ceremony lasted about 20 minutes. The first act featured 22 samba dancers and a host of other performers, 32 of the dancers wearing dresses decorated in the colours of each of the participating teams. The second act featured musical performances headlined by Colombian singer Shakira, and included singers Carlinhos Brown, Wyclef Jean, Alexandre Pires and Ivete Sangalo as well as guitarist Carlos Santana. Brazilian supermodel Gisele Bündchen and Carles Puyol, a member of Spain's winning team in 2010, unveiled the FIFA World Cup Trophy.

Brazilian president Dilma Rousseff was present at the final, along with Russian president Vladimir Putin, whose country hosted the next World Cup, and Jacob Zuma, the president of South Africa, the previous host country. Representing the finalists, German president Joachim Gauck and chancellor Angela Merkel were in attendance, although Argentina's president Cristina Fernández de Kirchner could not attend because of both her grandson's birthday and a case of pharyngo-laryngitis. Other world leaders present included Viktor Orbán of Hungary, Ali Bongo Ondimba of Gabon and Antigua and Barbuda's Gaston Browne. Several celebrities and athletes also attended the final, including Rihanna, Daniel Craig, Mick Jagger, Ashton Kutcher, David Beckham, Tom Brady, Olivier Dacourt, LeBron James, and Christian Vieri. Former World Cup winners like Fabio Cannavaro, Lothar Matthäus, Daniel Passarella, Marco Materazzi and Pelé were present as well. Brazilian spectators at the game were largely supportive of the Germans as a result of the Argentina–Brazil football rivalry, despite their team's heavy semi-final loss.

Germany were forced to make a late change to their line-up when Khedira sustained a calf injury during the warm-up before the match. He was replaced in the line-up by Christoph Kramer, with Germany's team otherwise unchanged from that which started in their win over Brazil in the semi-final. Argentina began the match with the identical team to that which started their semi-final against the Netherlands.

=== First half ===
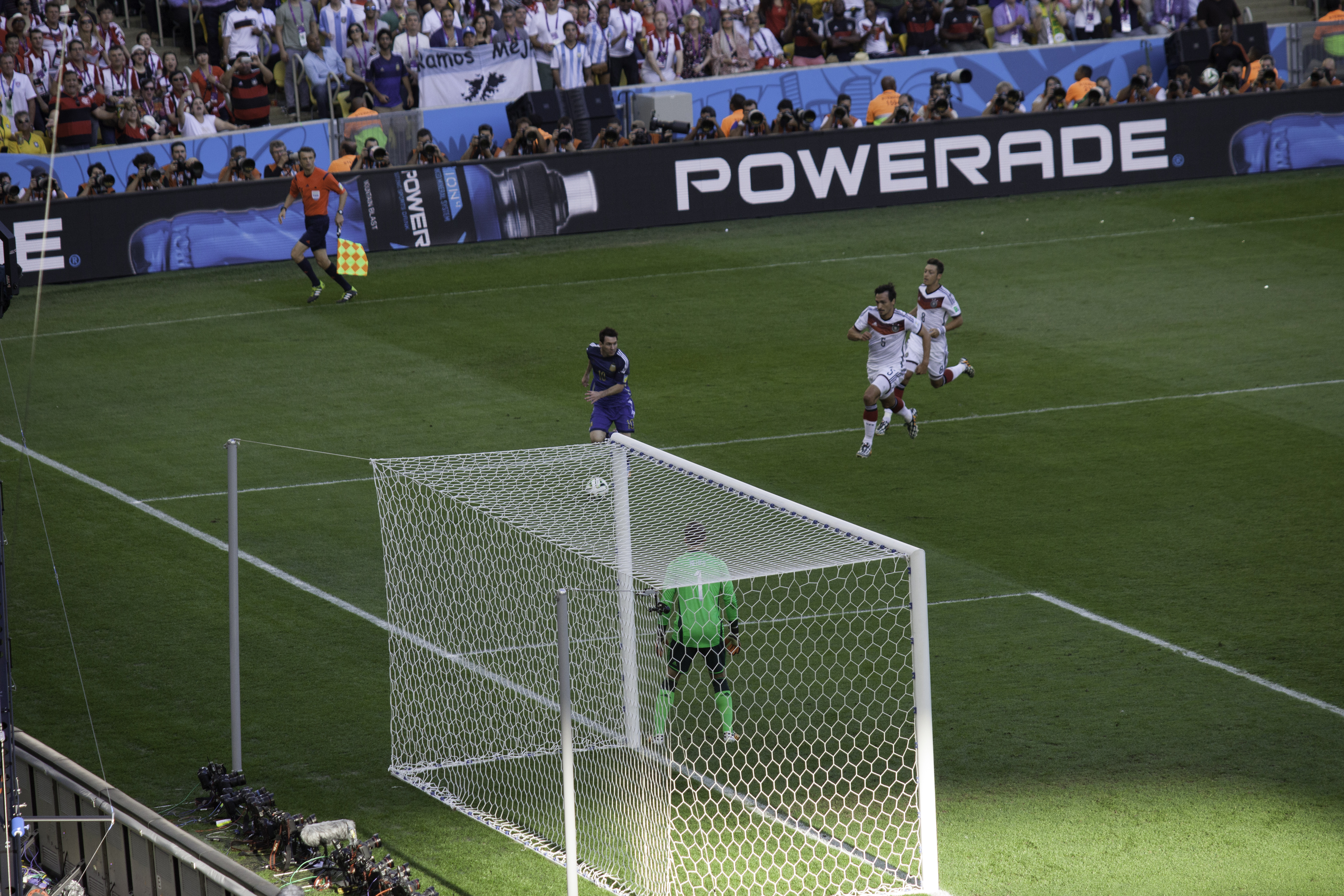
Lionel Messi running with the ball into the penalty area on nine minutes

Germany kicked off the match at 4 pm local time (7 pm UTC) in temperatures of 23 °C (73 °F) with 65% humidity, in front of a crowd of 74,738 and an estimated global television audience of 1.013 billion. The weather at Santos Dumont Airport, 6.5 kilometres (4 mi) from the stadium, (Note: Distance measured using Google Maps distance calculator, between Rio de Janeiro Airport RJ Santos Dumont, coordinates 22.913°S 43.167°W and Maracanã, coordinates 22.912°S 43.232°W.) was recorded as fair at the time of kick-off, becoming partly cloudy later in the evening. Germany won a free kick 3 minutes into the game, when Rojo fouled Müller around 25 yards (23 m) from the Argentina goal. The free kick was hit straight at the wall, and Argentina launched a counterattack from the rebound. Pablo Zabaleta ran with the ball down the right before passing to Higuaín on the edge of the penalty area. He took a shot from a narrow angle, but the ball went wide of Neuer's left-hand goalpost. On 9 minutes, Messi outpaced Hummels on the Argentina right and ran into the penalty area. He attempted to find Ezequiel Lavezzi from the byline but Schweinsteiger reached it first and cleared. Germany had considerably more of the early possession, but a German defensive error on 20 minutes gave Argentina what Jerry Hinnen of CBS Sports called "the best opportunity for either side" thus far. Kroos miscued a header, which left Higuaín one-on-one with Neuer, but the latter's shot from the edge of the penalty area went wide of the goal. On 23 minutes, Klose had a chance to score when the ball reached him following a cross by Philipp Lahm, but Zabaleta dispossessed him before he could shoot.

In the 30th minute, Lavezzi found space for Argentina on the right and crossed into the penalty area. Higuaín collected the ball and slotted it past Neuer into the goal. He celebrated for several seconds, but the strike was disallowed as he had been in an offside position. Germany made a substitution shortly afterwards, taking off Kramer as a result of a head injury he had sustained 14 minutes previously. He was replaced by Schürrle. Höwedes received a yellow card on 33 minutes for a tackle which connected with Zabaleta's shins, before Messi had a 20-yard (18 m) shot blocked by Schweinsteiger. A minute later, Germany launched an attack down the left through Müller, who passed to Schürrle. He hit a shot towards the top left of the goal, but Romero did a full-stretch dive to save it, despite having his eyeline blocked by Özil. Messi then had another opportunity, running with the ball into the Germany penalty area and kicking the ball towards goal. Jérôme Boateng prevented Argentina taking the lead with a goal-line clearance. Shortly before half time, Höwedes received a Kroos corner in the penalty area, in what reporters for UEFA called the "best chance of the half", but his headed shot from an offside position struck the goalpost and it remained 0–0 at half time.

=== Second half ===
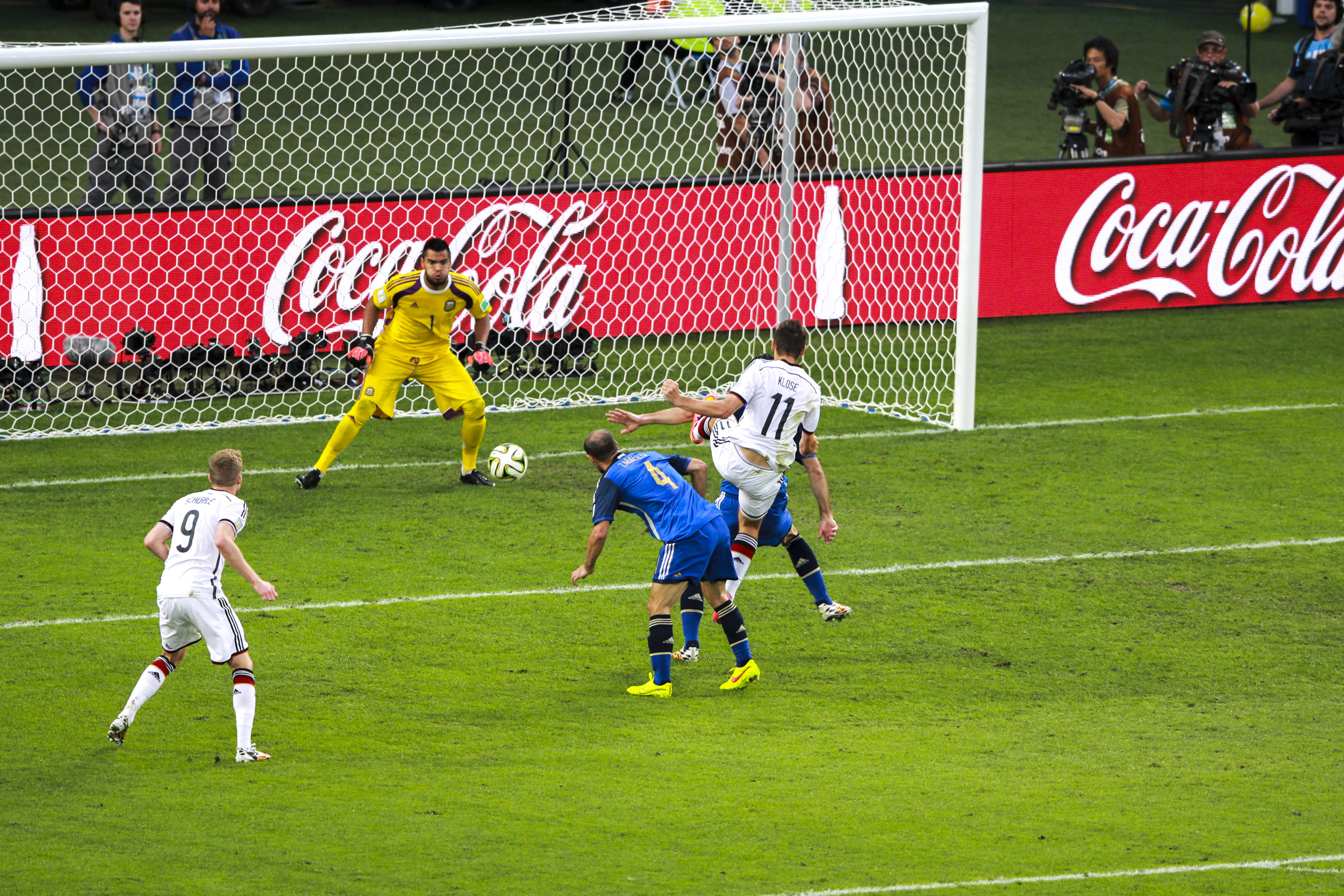
Miroslav Klose shooting at goal in the second half of the game

Argentina began the second half with Agüero on the field in place of Lavezzi. Higuaín had a shot in the first minute of the half after running down the right wing, but it went wide of Neuer's goal. Messi then had an opportunity to score when he was one-on-one with the goalkeeper a minute later, but his low shot on goal also went wide. Argentina had more possession than Germany in the opening 10 minutes of the half, and they had another chance on 50 minutes when Higuaín received a ball just inside the penalty area; he missed the ball with his attempted shot. In the 56th minute, Neuer took down Higuaín in the penalty area, but no penalty was given, despite Argentine commentators believing it should be given. No card was given either. Klose had Germany's first shot on goal of the second half on 59 minutes but his shot lacked power and was caught by Romero. Argentina had an opportunity to score through a Martín Demichelis header four minutes later, but Klose intercepted to send it behind. Shortly afterwards, Javier Mascherano brought down Klose after losing the ball to him, and was booked. His team-mate Agüero was also booked a minute later for a foul on Schweinsteiger. Midway through the second half, The Guardian's Scott Murray commented that the first half had been "goalless and brilliant", but the second was "goalless and ... well, not so much", although he noted that it remained an open game.

Germany had a chance on 71 minutes, Müller, Schürrle and Özil all getting involved in a build-up which Murray described as "tiki-taka", but when Schürrle eventually reached the penalty area with only Romero to beat, he failed to control the ball properly and the goalkeeper claimed it. Messi had a shot on 75 minutes, following a run across the edge of the German penalty area, which he attempted to curl into the top left-hand corner of the goal; it missed the target. Germany appealed for a penalty with 10 minutes remaining, after a tussle close to the Argentina goalpost following a Lahm cross, but the referee awarded a goal kick to Argentina. Kroos then had a chance for Germany following a lay-off pass by Özil, but he again missed the target. Both sides made substitutions in the final 5 minutes – Fernando Gago replacing Enzo Pérez for Argentina, and Götze came on for Klose for Germany. This represented Klose's last appearance for Germany, and he remained the most prolific goalscorer for any country in World Cup history, until the 2026 World Cup, when Lionel Messi surpassed his record after scoring a brace against Austria.

=== Extra time ===
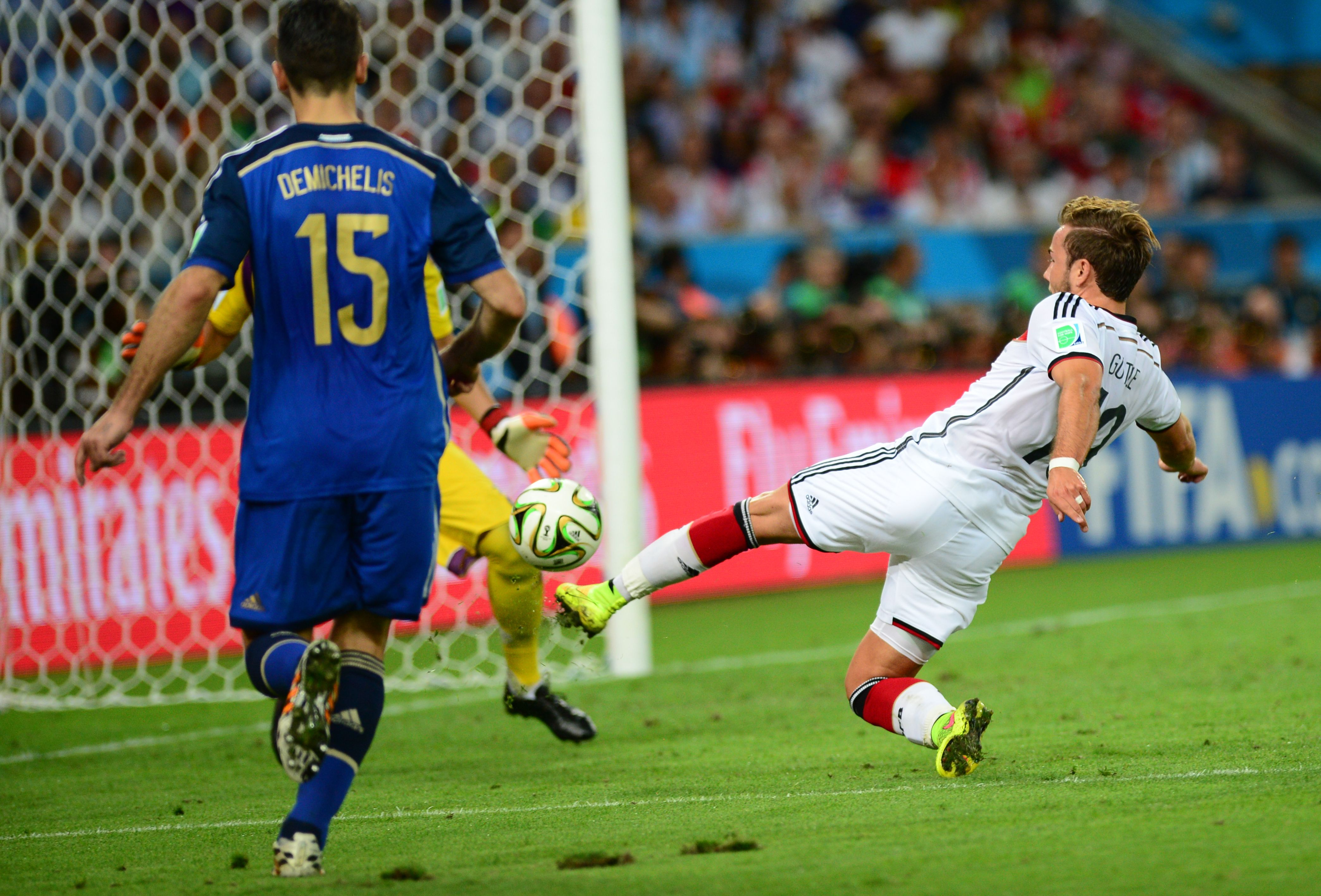
Mario Götze struck the winning goal in extra time

Early in the first half of extra time, Schürrle received a pass in front of goal from Götze, but his close-range shot was stopped by Romero. This was followed by a break upfield by Messi and Agüero with only two defenders covering, but Boateng was able to intercept and clear the danger. Five minutes later, a lob by Rodrigo Palacio over Neuer went just wide after the forward jumped on a mistake by Hummels in the German penalty area. At the halfway point in extra time, Murray wrote that Argentina were "offering very little up front" and speculated that many of the players might be "thinking about penalties already". Alan Tyers of The Daily Telegraph noted that Messi did not "look quite the ticket" and that he had not been playing well since half time. In the second half of extra time, Germany broke the deadlock when Götze scored in the 113th minute. Schürrle raced past two defenders on the left before crossing into the penalty area, where Götze controlled the ball on his chest and then volleyed left-footed into the net. Müller had a chance to double Germany's lead shortly afterward when he dribbled past two defenders, but his shot across the net was too wide. Late in extra time, Messi had an opportunity to equalise from a free kick within goal-scoring distance, but his attempt flew high over the crossbar. That proved to be the last action of the game as the final whistle was blown, confirming Germany's 1–0 victory.

=== Details ===
13 July 2014
16:00 BRT (UTC−3)

Germany	1–0 (a.e.t.)	Argentina
Götze 113'

Maracanã Stadium, Rio de Janeiro
Attendance: 74,738
Referee: Nicola Rizzoli (Italy)

Germany	Argentina

GK	1	Manuel Neuer
RB	16	Philipp Lahm (c)
CB	20	Jérôme Boateng
CB	5	Mats Hummels
LB	4	Benedikt Höwedes	(yellow card) 34'
RM	23	Christoph Kramer		(substituted off) 32'
CM	7	Bastian Schweinsteiger	(yellow card) 29'
LM	18	Toni Kroos
RF	13	Thomas Müller
CF	11	Miroslav Klose		(substituted off) 88'
LF	8	Mesut Özil		(substituted off) 120'
Substitutions:
FW	9	André Schürrle		(substituted on) 32'
MF	19	Mario Götze		(substituted on) 88'
DF	17	Per Mertesacker		(substituted on) 120'
Manager:
Joachim Löw

GK	1	Sergio Romero
RB	4	Pablo Zabaleta
CB	15	Martín Demichelis
CB	2	Ezequiel Garay
LB	16	Marcos Rojo
CM	14	Javier Mascherano	(yellow card) 64'
CM	6	Lucas Biglia
RW	8	Enzo Pérez		(substituted off) 86'
AM	10	Lionel Messi (c)
LW	22	Ezequiel Lavezzi		(substituted off) 46'
CF	9	Gonzalo Higuaín		(substituted off) 78'
Substitutions:
FW	20	Sergio Agüero	(yellow card) 65'	(substituted on) 46'
FW	18	Rodrigo Palacio		(substituted on) 78'
MF	5	Fernando Gago		(substituted on) 86'
Manager:
Alejandro Sabella

Man of the Match:
Mario Götze (Germany)

Assistant referees:
Renato Faverani (Italy)
Andrea Stefani (Italy)
Fourth official:
Carlos Vera (Ecuador)
Fifth official:
Christian Lescano (Ecuador)

Match rules:

- 90 minutes.
- 30 minutes of extra-time if necessary.
- Penalty shoot-out if still tied.
- Twelve named eligible substitutes.
- Maximum of three substitutions.

=== Statistics ===
Overall statistics
Statistic	Germany	Argentina
Goals scored	1	0
Total shots	10	10
Shots on target	7	2
Ball possession	60%	40%
Corner kicks	5	3
Fouls committed	20	16
Offsides	3	2
Saves	2	6
Yellow cards	2	2
Red cards	0	0

== Post-match ==
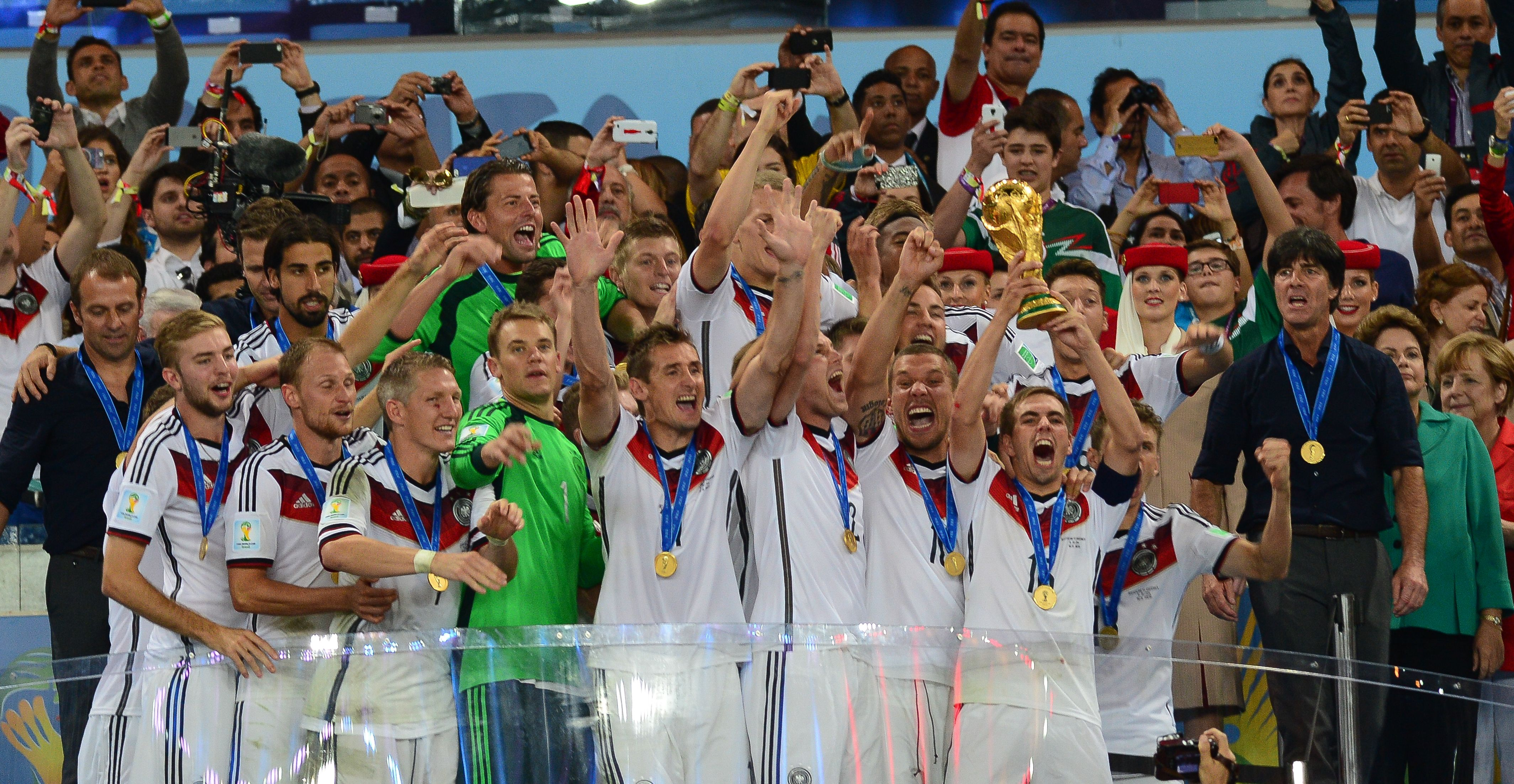
German captain Philipp Lahm lifts the World Cup trophy

Germany's victory marked the first World Cup win by a European team in the Americas, as well as the third successive European triumph after Italy and Spain's wins in 2006 and 2010. President Rousseff of Brazil presented the trophy to German captain Philipp Lahm. Alongside her during the trophy handover was FIFA president Sepp Blatter. As Lahm raised the trophy, the outro of the tournament's official song "We Are One (Ole Ola)" was played. The goalscorer Götze was named as the official man of the match for the final, despite playing only the last two minutes of normal time and thirty minutes of extra time. Messi was awarded the Golden Ball, FIFA's award for whom they considered the tournament's best player, and Neuer was given the Golden Glove for best goalkeeper.

Joachim Löw, the manager of Germany, labelled his side's win as the culmination of a project which had begun ten years previously under his predecessor Jürgen Klinsmann. Speaking after the game, Löw said: "We'd not made this ultimate step before, but champions do what they will do. This team has developed a spirit which is unbelievable." His Argentine counterpart, Alejandro Sabella, praised his players, describing them as "warriors", and felt that they had been unlucky to lose. He said that his team had had the better chances "but we didn't take them, and we only had to last another five minutes or so to reach penalties. The pain is immense." Götze expressed a sense of disbelief at his scoring of the winning goal, having not had the opportunity to play for much of the tournament. He said: "You score the goal and you don't really know what's happening. It hasn't been a simple tournament, or year, for me and I owe a lot to my family and my girlfriend who always believed in me. But a dream became reality here."

The German press praised the team for their overall performance in the tournament, contrasting it with the team's poor form a decade earlier. Christian Gödecke, writing in Der Spiegel wrote "Now Germany is world champion, and German football is barely recognisable. It's the perfect mix of virtue and magic, of hurrah and heave ho." Writers in the Süddeutsche Zeitung described the final as a "fitting punchline" to the tournament, while noting that "There won't be debates like there were in Rome in 1990, when the penalty that Andreas Brehme netted for the 1–0 victory was controversial and triggered conspiracy theories against FIFA amongst the Argentinians". In Argentina, the press were downbeat but also indicated their pride in the team's achievement, with many newspapers featuring a front-page picture of Messi after the match, alone or with his teammates. Newspaper Clarín lamented the team's missed chances and their denied penalty appeal. Ezequiel Fernández Moores of La Nación thought Germany the deserved winners, and believed the referee correct in denying Higuaín's penalty appeal. The host country's rivalry with Argentina continued to feature in the Brazilian press after the game, sports daily Lance! using the headline "Tell Me How You Feel Now" in response to Argentine mocking of Brazil throughout the tournament. Speaking on his TV show, Maradona responded to this by contrasting Argentina's one-goal defeat to the 7–1 loss suffered by Brazil. A photograph by Chinese photographer Bao Tailiang of the Chengdu Economic Daily, showing Messi staring at the World Cup Trophy after Argentina's defeat, won the Sports Singles award at the 2015 World Press Photo of the Year contest.

Germany's next major tournament was UEFA Euro 2016, in which they reached the semi-final before losing 2–0 to hosts France. At the subsequent 2018 World Cup in Russia, Germany failed to advance from the group phase, finishing bottom of their group behind Sweden, Mexico and South Korea. Germany secured only one win at the tournament, over Sweden, and lost to Mexico and South Korea, becoming the third successive World Cup holders to be eliminated in the group stage after Italy in 2010 and Spain in 2014, and also was eliminated in the early stages of a World Cup for the first time since 1938. Germany would again fail to surpass the group stage in 2022 as well. Additionally, Germany has failed to keep a clean sheet in every World Cup match since the 2014 final, up to and including their elimination from the 2026 tournament in a penalty shoot-out against Paraguay.

Argentina's next major tournament was the 2015 Copa América, where they reached the final but were defeated by Chile in a penalty shoot-out, followed by a rematch at the 2016 Copa América at the final where they would also lose to them in a penalty shoot-out. In the 2018 World Cup, they advanced from their group in second place behind Croatia, before being beaten in the round of 16 by eventual winners France. Argentina eventually won their third World Cup with a victory against France on penalties in the 2022 FIFA World Cup final.

== See also ==
- Argentina at the FIFA World Cup
- Germany at the FIFA World Cup
