= 2014 FIFA World Cup Group F =

Football tournament group stage

Group F of the 2014 FIFA World Cup consisted of Argentina, Bosnia and Herzegovina, Iran and Nigeria. Play began on 15 June and ended on 25 June 2014. The top two teams, Argentina and Nigeria, advanced to the round of 16.

== Teams ==
Draw position	Team	Confederation	Method of qualification	Date of qualification	Finals appearance	Last appearance	Previous best performance	FIFA Rankings	
Draw position	Team	Confederation	Method of qualification	Date of qualification	Finals appearance	Last appearance	Previous best performance	October 2013 (Note: The rankings of October 2013 were used for seeding for the final draw.)	June 2014
F1 (seed)	Argentina	CONMEBOL	CONMEBOL winners	10 September 2013	16th	2010	Winners (1978, 1986)	3	5
F2	Bosnia and Herzegovina	UEFA	UEFA Group G winners	15 October 2013	1st	—	—	16	21
F3	Iran	AFC	AFC fourth round Group A winners	18 June 2013	4th	2006	Group stage (1978, 1998, 2006)	49	43
F4	Nigeria	CAF	CAF third round winners	16 November 2013	5th	2010	Round of 16 (1994, 1998)	33	44

== Standings ==
Pos	Team	Pld	W	D	L	GF	GA	GD	Pts	Qualification
1	Argentina	3	3	0	0	6	3	+3	9	Advance to knockout stage
2	Nigeria	3	1	1	1	3	3	0	4	Advance to knockout stage
3	Bosnia and Herzegovina	3	1	0	2	4	4	0	3	
4	Iran	3	0	1	2	1	4	−3	1	

Source: FIFA
Rules for classification: Tie-breaking criteria
- Argentina advanced to play Switzerland (runner-up of Group E) in the round of 16.
- Nigeria advanced to play France (winner of Group E) in the round of 16.

== Matches ==
=== Argentina vs Bosnia and Herzegovina ===
The two teams had met in two previous matches, both in friendlies, most recently in 2013, both won by Argentina.

Bosnia and Herzegovina conceded three minutes into their World Cup debut, when Lionel Messi's free kick from the left was flicked on by Marcos Rojo and bounced off Sead Kolašinac into the net for an own goal. In the second half, Messi played a one-two with substitute Gonzalo Higuaín and shot home from the edge of the penalty area with his left foot into the bottom-right corner. With five minutes remaining in normal time, Bosnia and Herzegovina pulled one back, when Senad Lulić's pass found substitute Vedad Ibišević to score the country's first ever World Cup goal, shooting under the goalkeeper with his left foot.

Kolašinac's own goal after two minutes and nine seconds broke the record for the fastest own goal in the history of the FIFA World Cup, surpassing Carlos Gamarra's own goal (two minutes and 46 seconds) in Paraguay's first group stage match against England at the 2006 FIFA World Cup.

15 June 2014
19:00 BRT (UTC−3)

Argentina	2–1	Bosnia and Herzegovina
Kolašinac 3' (o.g.); Messi 65'		Ibišević 85'

Estádio do Maracanã, Rio de Janeiro
Attendance: 74,738
Referee: Joel Aguilar (El Salvador)

Argentina	Bosnia and Herzegovina

GK	1	Sergio Romero
CB	3	Hugo Campagnaro		(substituted off) 46'
CB	17	Federico Fernández
CB	2	Ezequiel Garay
RWB	4	Pablo Zabaleta
LWB	16	Marcos Rojo	(yellow card) 25'
RM	11	Maxi Rodríguez		(substituted off) 46'
CM	14	Javier Mascherano
LM	7	Ángel Di María
CF	10	Lionel Messi (c)
CF	20	Sergio Agüero		(substituted off) 87'
Substitutions:
FW	9	Gonzalo Higuaín		(substituted on) 46'
MF	5	Fernando Gago		(substituted on) 46'
MF	6	Lucas Biglia		(substituted on) 87'
Manager:
Alejandro Sabella

GK	1	Asmir Begović
RB	13	Mensur Mujdža		(substituted off) 69'
CB	3	Ermin Bičakčić
CB	4	Emir Spahić (c)	(yellow card) 63'
LB	5	Sead Kolašinac
CM	7	Muhamed Bešić
CM	20	Izet Hajrović		(substituted off) 71'
RW	8	Miralem Pjanić
AM	10	Zvjezdan Misimović		(substituted off) 74'
LW	16	Senad Lulić
CF	11	Edin Džeko
Substitutions:
FW	9	Vedad Ibišević		(substituted on) 69'
MF	19	Edin Višća		(substituted on) 71'
MF	18	Haris Medunjanin		(substituted on) 74'
Manager:
Safet Sušić

Man of the Match:
Lionel Messi (Argentina)

Assistant referees:
William Torres (El Salvador)
Juan Zumba (El Salvador)
Fourth official:
Djamel Haimoudi (Algeria)
Fifth official:
Abdelhalk Etchiali (Algeria)

=== Iran vs Nigeria ===
The two teams had met in one previous match, in the 1998 Lunar New Year Cup, won 1–0 by Nigeria.

In a goalless game of few chances, Iran's Reza Ghoochannejhad forced a save from Vincent Enyeama in the first half, while Nigeria substitute Shola Ameobi headed wide in the second half.

This was the first goalless match as well as the first draw of the tournament after the previous 12 matches all produced a winner, and was the longest wait for a draw in a single tournament since 1930, where there were no draws in the entire tournament. This was also the first clean sheet kept by Iran in the World Cup.

16 June 2014
16:00 BRT (UTC−3)

Iran	0–0	Nigeria

Arena da Baixada, Curitiba
Attendance: 39,081
Referee: Carlos Vera (Ecuador)

Iran	Nigeria

GK	12	Alireza Haghighi
RB	4	Jalal Hosseini
CB	5	Amir Hossein Sadeghi
CB	15	Pejman Montazeri
LB	23	Mehrdad Pooladi
CM	2	Khosro Heydari		(substituted off) 89'
CM	14	Andranik Teymourian	(yellow card) 75'
AM	6	Javad Nekounam (c)
RF	21	Ashkan Dejagah		(substituted off) 73'
CF	16	Reza Ghoochannejhad
LF	3	Ehsan Hajsafi
Substitutions:
FW	9	Alireza Jahanbakhsh		(substituted on) 73'
MF	7	Masoud Shojaei		(substituted on) 89'
Manager:
(Portugal) Carlos Queiroz

GK	1	Vincent Enyeama (c)
RB	5	Efe Ambrose
CB	13	Juwon Oshaniwa
CB	14	Godfrey Oboabona	(substituted off) 29'
LB	22	Kenneth Omeruo
CM	17	Ogenyi Onazi
CM	15	Ramon Azeez	(substituted off) 69'
CM	10	John Obi Mikel
RW	11	Victor Moses	(substituted off) 52'
LW	7	Ahmed Musa
CF	9	Emmanuel Emenike
Substitutions:
DF	2	Joseph Yobo	(substituted on) 29'
FW	23	Shola Ameobi	(substituted on) 52'
FW	8	Peter Odemwingie	(substituted on) 69'
Manager:
Stephen Keshi

Man of the Match:
John Obi Mikel (Nigeria)

Assistant referees:
Christian Lescano (Ecuador)
Byron Romero (Ecuador)
Fourth official:
Wilmar Roldán (Colombia)
Fifth official:
Humberto Clavijo (Colombia)

=== Argentina vs Iran ===
The two teams had met in one previous match, in a friendly in 1977, won on penalties by Argentina after a 1–1 draw .

In a match where Argentina dominated in terms of possession and shots, they scored the only goal one minute into second half injury time when Lionel Messi received a pass from Ezequiel Lavezzi on the right wing, dribbled inside and curled a left-footed shot past the outstretched hands of the Iranian keeper Alireza Haghighi. Before the goal, Iran had chances to score, but Argentina goalkeeper Sergio Romero was able to save Ashkan Dejagah's header and Reza Ghoochannejhad's shot, and Dejagah also had a penalty appeal turned down when Argentina defender Pablo Zabaleta tackled him in the area but only just got his toe to the ball. With the win, Argentina were guaranteed to advance to the knockout stage.

21 June 2014
13:00 BRT (UTC−3)

Argentina	1–0	Iran
Messi 90+1'

Estádio Mineirão, Belo Horizonte
Attendance: 57,698
Referee: Milorad Mažić (Serbia)

Argentina	Iran

GK	1	Sergio Romero
RB	4	Pablo Zabaleta
CB	17	Federico Fernández
CB	2	Ezequiel Garay
LB	16	Marcos Rojo
CM	5	Fernando Gago
CM	14	Javier Mascherano
CM	7	Ángel Di María	(substituted off) 90+4'
RF	10	Lionel Messi (c)
CF	9	Gonzalo Higuaín	(substituted off) 76'
LF	20	Sergio Agüero	(substituted off) 76'
Substitutions:
FW	18	Rodrigo Palacio	(substituted on) 76'
FW	22	Ezequiel Lavezzi	(substituted on) 76'
MF	6	Lucas Biglia	(substituted on) 90+4'
Manager:
Alejandro Sabella

GK	12	Alireza Haghighi
RB	4	Jalal Hosseini
CB	5	Amir Hossein Sadeghi
CB	15	Pejman Montazeri
LB	23	Mehrdad Pooladi
CM	14	Andranik Teymourian
CM	6	Javad Nekounam (c)	(yellow card) 53'
RW	21	Ashkan Dejagah		(substituted off) 85'
AM	7	Masoud Shojaei	(yellow card) 73'	(substituted off) 76'
LW	3	Ehsan Hajsafi		(substituted off) 88'
CF	16	Reza Ghoochannejhad
Substitutions:
DF	2	Khosro Heydari		(substituted on) 76'
MF	9	Alireza Jahanbakhsh		(substituted on) 85'
MF	8	Reza Haghighi		(substituted on) 88'
Manager:
(Portugal) Carlos Queiroz

Man of the Match:
Lionel Messi (Argentina)

Assistant referees:
Milovan Ristić (Serbia)
Dalibor Đurđević (Serbia)
Fourth official:
Norbert Hauata (Tahiti)
Fifth official:
Aden Range (Kenya)

=== Nigeria vs Bosnia and Herzegovina ===
The two teams had never met before.

Bosnia and Herzegovina thought they had taken the lead when Edin Džeko put the ball into the net, but his effort was ruled out for offside, which replays later showed to be an incorrect decision. Referee Peter O'Leary later admitted Džeko's goal was disallowed in error. Seven minutes later, Nigeria took the lead when Emmanuel Emenike burst past Emir Spahić to cross for Peter Odemwingie to score, firing in through the legs of Asmir Begovic. Džeko came closest to scoring the equaliser to keep his team's qualification chances alive, but his shot in second-half stoppage time was deflected onto the post by Nigeria goalkeeper Vincent Enyeama. Nigeria held for the win and eliminated Bosnia and Herzegovina as a result.

21 June 2014
18:00 AMT (UTC−4)

Nigeria	1–0	Bosnia and Herzegovina
Odemwingie 29'

Arena Pantanal, Cuiabá
Attendance: 40,499
Referee: Peter O'Leary (New Zealand)

Nigeria	Bosnia and Herzegovina

GK	1	Vincent Enyeama
RB	5	Efe Ambrose
CB	2	Joseph Yobo (c)
CB	13	Juwon Oshaniwa
LB	22	Kenneth Omeruo
CM	17	Ogenyi Onazi
CM	10	John Obi Mikel	(yellow card) 81'
RW	7	Ahmed Musa		(substituted off) 65'
AM	8	Peter Odemwingie
LW	18	Michel Babatunde		(substituted off) 75'
CF	9	Emmanuel Emenike
Substitutions:
FW	23	Shola Ameobi		(substituted on) 65'
MF	3	Ejike Uzoenyi		(substituted on) 75'
Manager:
Stephen Keshi

GK	1	Asmir Begović
RB	13	Mensur Mujdža
CB	15	Toni Šunjić
CB	4	Emir Spahić (c)
LB	18	Haris Medunjanin	(yellow card) 6'	(substituted off) 64'
CM	8	Miralem Pjanić
CM	7	Muhamed Bešić
RW	20	Izet Hajrović		(substituted off) 57'
AM	10	Zvjezdan Misimović
LW	16	Senad Lulić		(substituted off) 58'
CF	11	Edin Džeko
Substitutions:
FW	9	Vedad Ibišević		(substituted on) 57'
MF	23	Sejad Salihović		(substituted on) 58'
MF	14	Tino-Sven Sušić		(substituted on) 64'
Manager:
Safet Sušić

Man of the Match:
Peter Odemwingie (Nigeria)

Assistant referees:
Jan-Hendrik Hintz (New Zealand)
Mark Rule (New Zealand)
Fourth official:
Roberto Moreno (Panama)
Fifth official:
Eric Boria (United States)

=== Nigeria vs Argentina ===
The two teams had met in six previous matches, including three times in the FIFA World Cup group stage, all won by Argentina (1994: 2–1; 2002: 1–0; 2010: 1–0).

Before the match, Nigeria were the only team yet to concede in the tournament, but their defence were breached inside three minutes when Ángel Di María's shot hit the post and Lionel Messi slammed home the rebound. Nigeria, which would qualify for the knockout stage if they gained a point or if Iran failed to beat Bosnia and Herzegovina in the other match, equalised within a minute, when Michel Babatunde fed Ahmed Musa, and he cut inside and curled the ball into the net. Messi put Argentina in front in first half injury time with a direct free kick, but Musa equalised once again early in the second half, after playing a one-two with Emmanuel Emenike and scored. Argentina, which needed only a point to win the group, then scored the game winner when a corner from Ezequiel Lavezzi was flicked on by an Ezequiel Garay header and Marcos Rojo scored with his knee. Argentina won the group with a perfect record of three wins out of three, while Nigeria were able to qualify as group runners-up despite losing as Iran also lost to Bosnia and Herzegovina in the other match.

Musa became the first Nigerian player to score more than once in a World Cup match.

25 June 2014
13:00 BRT (UTC−3)

Nigeria	2–3	Argentina
Musa 4', 47'		Messi 3', 45+1'; Rojo 50'

Estádio Beira-Rio, Porto Alegre
Attendance: 43,285
Referee: Nicola Rizzoli (Italy)

Nigeria	Argentina

GK	1	Vincent Enyeama
RB	5	Efe Ambrose
CB	2	Joseph Yobo (c)
CB	13	Juwon Oshaniwa	(yellow card) 51'
LB	22	Kenneth Omeruo	(yellow card) 49'
CM	17	Ogenyi Onazi
CM	10	John Obi Mikel
RW	7	Ahmed Musa
LW	18	Michel Babatunde		(substituted off) 66'
SS	8	Peter Odemwingie		(substituted off) 80'
CF	9	Emmanuel Emenike
Substitutions:
FW	20	Michael Uchebo		(substituted on) 66'
FW	19	Uche Nwofor		(substituted on) 80'
Manager:
Stephen Keshi

GK	1	Sergio Romero
RB	4	Pablo Zabaleta
CB	17	Federico Fernández
CB	2	Ezequiel Garay
LB	16	Marcos Rojo
DM	14	Javier Mascherano
RM	5	Fernando Gago
LM	7	Ángel Di María
AM	10	Lionel Messi (c)	(substituted off) 63'
CF	9	Gonzalo Higuaín	(substituted off) 90'
CF	20	Sergio Agüero	(substituted off) 38'
Substitutions:
FW	22	Ezequiel Lavezzi	(substituted on) 38'
MF	19	Ricky Álvarez	(substituted on) 63'
MF	6	Lucas Biglia	(substituted on) 90'
Manager:
Alejandro Sabella

Man of the Match:
Lionel Messi (Argentina)

Assistant referees:
Renato Faverani (Italy)
Andrea Stefani (Italy)
Fourth official:
Svein Oddvar Moen (Norway)
Fifth official:
Kim Haglund (Norway)

=== Bosnia and Herzegovina vs Iran ===
The two teams had met in five previous matches, all in friendlies, most recently in 2009.

Bosnia and Herzegovina, which had already been eliminated, led 1–0 at half-time through a goal by Edin Džeko, shooting low with his left foot after he received a pass from Miralem Pjanić. Pjanić extended the lead in the second half when he slotted low past the goalkeeper, after receiving a through ball from Tino-Sven Sušić. Iran, which had to win and also hoped Nigeria lost to Argentina to have any chance for qualification to the knockout stage, reduced the deficit after Reza Ghoochannejhad tapped home from close range from a Javad Nekounam cross. However, Bosnia and Herzegovina scored a third goal when Avdija Vršajević slotted home with his right foot after Sejad Salihović played him in on the right, sealing their first win in World Cup finals history, and also confirming Iran's elimination, meaning that they failed to advance to the knockout stage for all four of their World Cup campaigns.

With Ghoochannejhad's goal for Iran, the 2014 World Cup became the first since 1998 in which every participating team managed to score at least once.

25 June 2014
13:00 BRT (UTC−3)

Bosnia and Herzegovina	3–1	Iran
Džeko 23'; Pjanić 59'; Vršajević 83'		Ghoochannejhad 82'

Itaipava Arena Fonte Nova, Salvador
Attendance: 48,011
Referee: Carlos Velasco Carballo (Spain)

Bosnia and Herzegovina	Iran

GK	1	Asmir Begović
RB	2	Avdija Vršajević
CB	15	Toni Šunjić
CB	4	Emir Spahić (c)
LB	5	Sead Kolašinac
CM	8	Miralem Pjanić
CM	7	Muhamed Bešić	(yellow card) 78'
RW	21	Anel Hadžić		(substituted off) 61'
LW	14	Tino-Sven Sušić		(substituted off) 79'
CF	11	Edin Džeko		(substituted off) 85'
CF	9	Vedad Ibišević
Substitutions:
DF	6	Ognjen Vranješ		(substituted on) 61'
MF	23	Sejad Salihović		(substituted on) 79'
FW	19	Edin Višća		(substituted on) 85'
Manager:
Safet Sušić

GK	12	Alireza Haghighi
RB	4	Jalal Hosseini
CB	5	Amir Hossein Sadeghi
CB	15	Pejman Montazeri
LB	23	Mehrdad Pooladi
CM	6	Javad Nekounam (c)
CM	14	Andranik Teymourian
RW	21	Ashkan Dejagah		(substituted off) 68'
AM	7	Masoud Shojaei		(substituted off) 46'
LW	3	Ehsan Hajsafi		(substituted off) 63'
CF	16	Reza Ghoochannejhad
Substitutions:
MF	2	Khosro Heydari		(substituted on) 46'
FW	9	Alireza Jahanbakhsh		(substituted on) 63'
FW	10	Karim Ansarifard	(yellow card) 88'	(substituted on) 68'
Manager:
(Portugal) Carlos Queiroz

Man of the Match:
Edin Džeko (Bosnia and Herzegovina)

Assistant referees:
Roberto Alonso (Spain)
Juan Carlos Yuste (Spain)
Fourth official:
Enrique Osses (Chile)
Fifth official:
Carlos Astroza (Chile)

== See also ==
- Argentina at the FIFA World Cup
- Bosnia and Herzegovina at the FIFA World Cup
- Iran at the FIFA World Cup
- Nigeria at the FIFA World Cup
