= Bosnia and Herzegovina at the FIFA World Cup =

International football delegation

The Bosnia and Herzegovina national football team has qualified for the FIFA World Cup on two occasions, their first in 2014 and second in 2026.

== Bosnian players for Yugoslavia ==
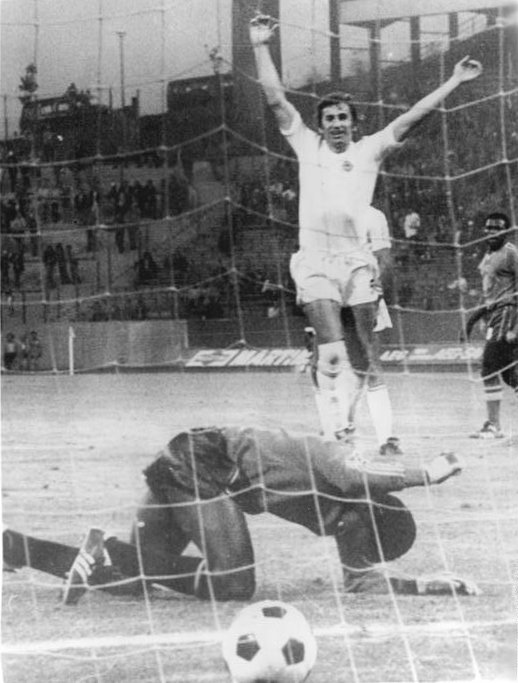
Bosnian Josip Katalinski celebrates a Yugoslav goal vs Zaire (present day DR Congo) at the 1974 FIFA World Cup.

Yugoslavia men's national football team participated in the World Cup eight times between 1930 and 1990. While in the early editions they were mainly represented by Serbian players, the squads became all-inclusive after the World War II, from 1945 until break-up.

Several Bosnian players were part of the 1974 first team line-up that advanced from the group stage unbeaten and ahead of Brazil. Striker Dušan Bajević scored three goals in one of the highest World Cup victories of all time: Yugoslavia's 9–0 against Zaire. Defender Josip Katalinski also scored during this game. Other Bosnians from that years' team include goalkeeper Enver Marić and defender Enver Hadžiabdić.

Playmaker Safet Sušić, widely regarded finest player of his generation, and considered to be the best Bosnian player of all time, represented Yugoslavia at the World Cup in 1982, together with other Bosnian players such as Pašić, Šljivo, Halilhodžić and Vujović brothers. Safet Sušić played crucial playmaking role again in Italy in 1990 World Cup, when the team was managed by Bosnian coach Ivica Osim, and often fielded many Bosnian players, such as Jozić, Hadžibegić, Baždarević, Vujović, Baljić, Šabanadžović, Omerović. This Yugoslav team reached the quarter-finals in 1990 and was captained by Zlatko Vujović, while Sušić put some of the best performances of the tournament and was one of the highest rated Yugoslav players, along with his compatriot Davor Jozić, Serbian Dragan Stojković, and Croatian goalkeeper Tomislav Ivković.

== Overall record ==
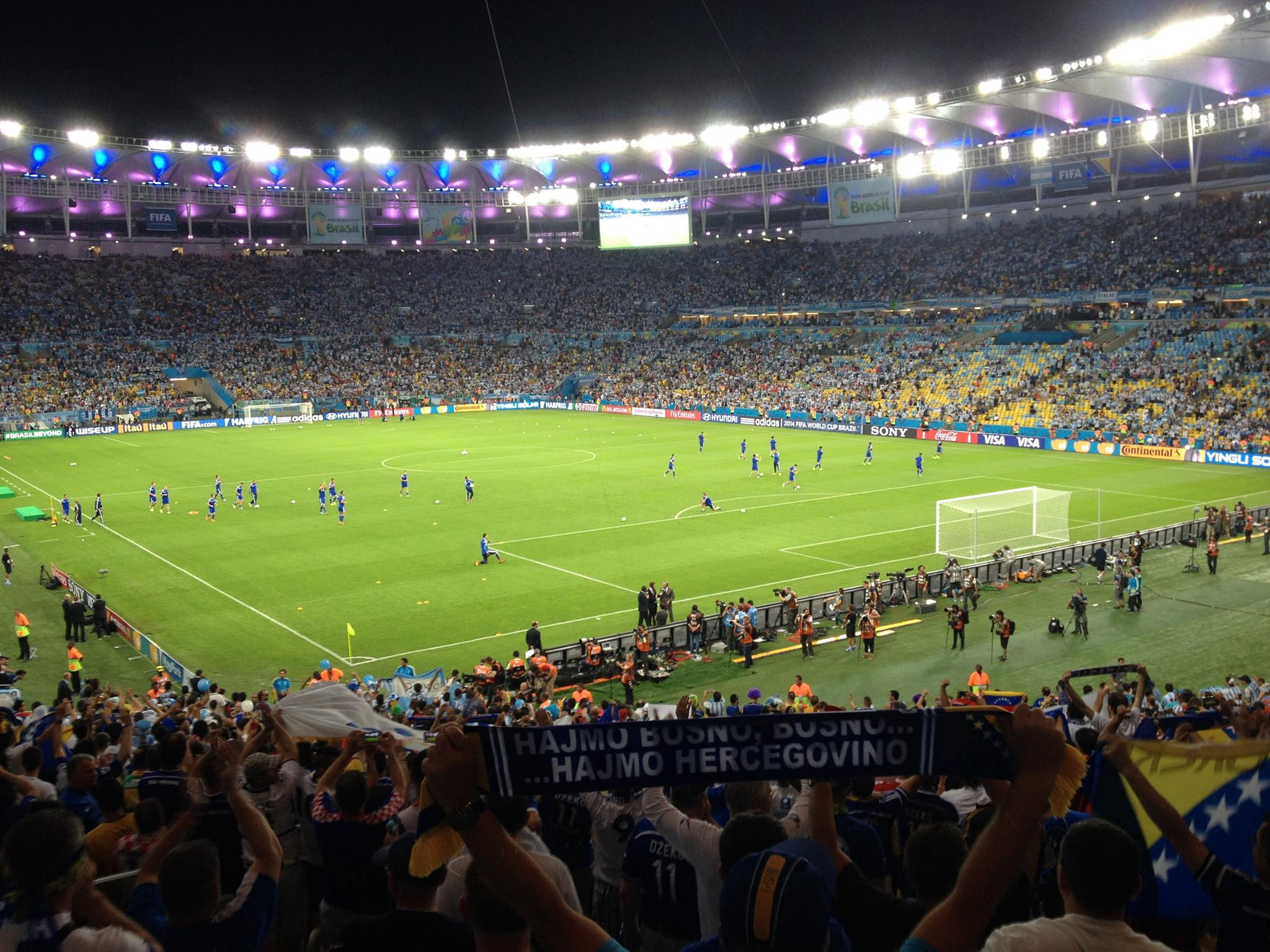
Bosnia and Herzegovina 2014 FIFA World Cup match at Estádio do Maracanã against Argentina.

After Bosnia and Herzegovina gained independence from Yugoslavia on 1 March 1992, the national football team was soon formed but could not enter qualifying for the 1994 World Cup as the national association was not yet a member of FIFA. During qualifiers for the 1998 World Cup, Bosnia's first home match against Croatia was played in Bologna. The match was held at the neutral venue due to the renovation of the Asim Ferhatović Hase Stadium in Sarajevo.

Bosnia finished in third place during the 2006 World Cup qualifiers, recording two draws with Spain along the way. During qualifiers for the 2010 World Cup Bosnia reached its first ever playoffs for a major tournament, where they eventually lost 2–0 on aggregate to Portugal.

The 2014 World Cup was the first time Bosnia appeared at a major tournament as an independent nation, having qualified by topping UEFA Group G.

FIFA World Cup record										Qualification record						
Year	Round	Position	Pld	W	D	L	GF	GA	Squad	Pos.	Pld	W	D	L	GF	GA
(Uruguay) 1930 to (Italy) 1990	Part of Yugoslavia									Part of Yugoslavia						
as Republic of Bosnia and Herzegovina										as Republic of Bosnia and Herzegovina						
(United States) 1994	Could not enter									Could not enter						
(France) 1998	Did not qualify									4th	8	3	0	5	9	14
as Bosnia and Herzegovina										as Bosnia and Herzegovina						
(South Korea) (Japan) 2002	Did not qualify									4th	8	2	2	4	12	12
(Germany) 2006	Did not qualify									3rd	10	4	4	2	12	9
(South Africa) 2010	Did not qualify									2nd (PO)	12	6	1	5	25	15
(Brazil) 2014	Group stage	20th	3	1	0	2	4	4	Squad	1st	10	8	1	1	30	6
(Russia) 2018	Did not qualify									3rd	10	5	2	3	24	13
(Qatar) 2022	Did not qualify									4th	8	1	4	3	9	12
(Canada) (Mexico) (United States) 2026	Round of 32	29th	4	1	1	2	5	8	Squad	2nd (PO)	8	5	2	1	17	7
(Morocco) (Portugal) (Spain) 2030	To be determined									To be determined						
(Saudi Arabia) 2034	To be determined									To be determined						
Total	Round of 32	2/8	7	2	1	4	9	12	—	2/8	72	34	16	24	138	88

==== List of matches ====
World Cup	Round	Opponent	Score	Result	Venue	Bosnia scorers
2014	Group F	Argentina	1–2	L	Rio de Janeiro	Ibišević
2014	Group F	Nigeria	0–1	L	Cuiabá	—
2014	Group F	Iran	3–1	W	Salvador	Džeko, Pjanić, Vršajević
2026	Group B	Canada	1–1	D	Toronto	Lukić
2026	Group B	Switzerland	1–4	L	Inglewood	Mahmić
2026	Group B	Qatar	3–1	W	Seattle	Alajbegović, Abunada (o.g.), Mahmić
2026	Round of 32	United States	0–2	L	Santa Clara	—

== 2014 FIFA World Cup ==
==== Squad ====

Bosnia and Herzegovina XI, their first ever major tournament match (vs Argentina at 2014 FIFA World Cup).
- Asmir Begović
- Avdija Vršajević
- Ermin Bičakčić
- Emir Spahić (c)
- Sead Kolašinac
- Ognjen Vranješ
- Muhamed Bešić
- Miralem Pjanić
- Vedad Ibišević
- Zvjezdan Misimović
- Edin Džeko
- Jasmin Fejzić
- Mensur Mujdža
- Tino-Sven Sušić
- Toni Šunjić
- Senad Lulić
- Senijad Ibričić
- Haris Medunjanin
- Edin Višća
- Izet Hajrović
- Anel Hadžić
- Asmir Avdukić
- Sejad Salihović
Head coach: Safet Sušić

==== Group Stage ====
Pos	Team	Pld	W	D	L	GF	GA	GD	Pts	Qualification
1	Argentina	3	3	0	0	6	3	+3	9	Advance to knockout stage
2	Nigeria	3	1	1	1	3	3	0	4	Advance to knockout stage
3	Bosnia and Herzegovina	3	1	0	2	4	4	0	3	
4	Iran	3	0	1	2	1	4	−3	1	

Source: FIFA
15 June 2014
19:00 BRT (UTC−3)

Argentina	2–1	Bosnia and Herzegovina
Kolašinac 3' (o.g.); Messi 65'		Ibišević 85'

Estádio do Maracanã, Rio de Janeiro
Attendance: 74,738
Referee: Joel Aguilar (El Salvador)

21 June 2014
18:00 AMT (UTC−4)

Nigeria	1–0	Bosnia and Herzegovina
Odemwingie 29'

Arena Pantanal, Cuiabá
Attendance: 40,499
Referee: Peter O'Leary (New Zealand)

25 June 2014
13:00 BRT (UTC−3)

Bosnia and Herzegovina	3–1	Iran
Džeko 23'; Pjanić 59'; Vršajević 83'		Ghoochannejhad 82'

Itaipava Arena Fonte Nova, Salvador
Attendance: 48,011
Referee: Carlos Velasco Carballo (Spain)

== 2026 FIFA World Cup ==
==== Squad ====

Bosnia and Herzegovina XI, their first ever knockout match at a major tournament (vs USA at 2026 FIFA World Cup).
- Nikola Vasilj
- Nihad Mujakić
- Dennis Hadžikadunić
- Tarik Muharemović
- Sead Kolašinac
- Benjamin Tahirović
- Amar Dedić
- Armin Gigović
- Samed Baždar
- Ermedin Demirović
- Edin Džeko (c)
- Mladen Jurkas
- Ivan Bašić
- Ivan Šunjić
- Amar Memić
- Amir Hadžiahmetović
- Dženis Burnić
- Nikola Katić
- Kerim Alajbegović
- Esmir Bajraktarević
- Stjepan Radeljić
- Martin Zlomislić
- Haris Tabaković
- Arjan Malić
- Jovo Lukić
- Ermin Mahmić
Head coach: Sergej Barbarez

==== Group Stage ====
Pos	Team	Pld	W	D	L	GF	GA	GD	Pts	Qualification
1	Switzerland	3	2	1	0	7	3	+4	7	Advance to knockout stage
2	Canada (H)	3	1	1	1	8	3	+5	4 (Note: Tied on head-to-head result (Canada 1–1 Bosnia and Herzegovina). Overall goal difference was used as the tiebreaker.)	Advance to knockout stage
3	Bosnia and Herzegovina	3	1	1	1	5	6	−1	4	Advance to knockout stage
4	Qatar	3	0	1	2	2	10	−8	1	

Source: FIFA
Rules for classification: Group stage tiebreakers
(H) Hosts
Notes:
June 12, 2026
3:00 p.m. UTC−4

Canada	1–1	Bosnia and Herzegovina
Larin 78'	(Note: "Canada vs Bosnia and Herzegovina | First Stage | FIFA World Cup 2026". FIFA. Retrieved June 12, 2026.; "Match Report – Group B – Canada v. Bosnia and Herzegovina". FIFA. June 12, 2026. Retrieved June 12, 2026.; "Post match summary report – Group B – Canada v. Bosnia and Herzegovina". FIFA. June 13, 2026. Retrieved June 28, 2026.)	Lukić 21'

BMO Field, Toronto
Attendance: 43,002
Referee: Facundo Tello (Argentina)

June 18, 2026
12:00 p.m. UTC−7

Switzerland	4–1	Bosnia and Herzegovina
Manzambi 74', 90'; Vargas 84'; Xhaka 90+7' (pen.)	(Note: "Switzerland vs Bosnia and Herzegovina | First Stage | FIFA World Cup 2026". FIFA. Retrieved June 18, 2026.; "Match Report – Group B – Switzerland v. Bosnia and Herzegovina". FIFA. June 18, 2026. Retrieved June 18, 2026.; "Post match summary report – Group B – Switzerland v. Bosnia and Herzegovina". FIFA. June 18, 2026. Retrieved June 19, 2026.)	Mahmić 90+3'

SoFi Stadium, Inglewood
Attendance: 70,026
Referee: João Pinheiro (Portugal)

June 24, 2026
12:00 p.m. UTC−7

Bosnia and Herzegovina	3–1	Qatar
Alajbegović 29'; Abunada 34' (o.g.); Mahmić 80'	(Note: "Bosnia and Herzegovina vs Qatar | First Stage | FIFA World Cup 2026". FIFA. Retrieved June 24, 2026.; "Match Report – Group B – Bosnia and Herzegovina v. Qatar". FIFA. June 24, 2026. Retrieved June 24, 2026.; "Post match summary report – Group B – Bosnia and Herzegovina v. Qatar". FIFA. June 25, 2026. Retrieved June 25, 2026.)	Al-Haydos 42'

Lumen Field, Seattle
Attendance: 66,925
Referee: Jesús Valenzuela (Venezuela)

==== Knockout stage ====
Round of 32

July 1, 2026
5:00 p.m. UTC−7

United States	2–0	Bosnia and Herzegovina
Balogun 45'; Tillman 82'	(Note: "USA vs Bosnia and Herzegovina | Round of 32 | FIFA World Cup 2026". FIFA. Retrieved July 2, 2026.; "Match Report – Round of 32 – USA v. Bosnia and Herzegovina". FIFA. July 2, 2026. Retrieved July 2, 2026.; "Post match summary report – Round of 32 – USA v. Bosnia and Herzegovina". FIFA. July 1, 2026. Retrieved July 3, 2026.)

Levi's Stadium, Santa Clara
Attendance: 68,827
Referee: Raphael Claus (Brazil)

== Head-to-head record ==
Opponent	Pld	W	D	L	GF	GA	GD	Win %	Confederation
Argentina	1	0	0	1	1	2	−1	0.00	CONMEBOL
Canada	1	0	1	0	1	1	0	50.00	CONCACAF
Iran	1	1	0	0	3	1	+2	100.00	AFC
Nigeria	1	0	0	1	0	1	−1	0.00	CAF
Qatar	1	1	0	0	3	1	+2	100.00	AFC
Switzerland	1	0	0	1	1	4	−3	0.00	UEFA
United States	1	0	0	1	0	2	−2	0.00	CONCACAF
Total	7	2	1	4	9	12	–3	35.71%	

== Player records ==
=== Most appearances ===
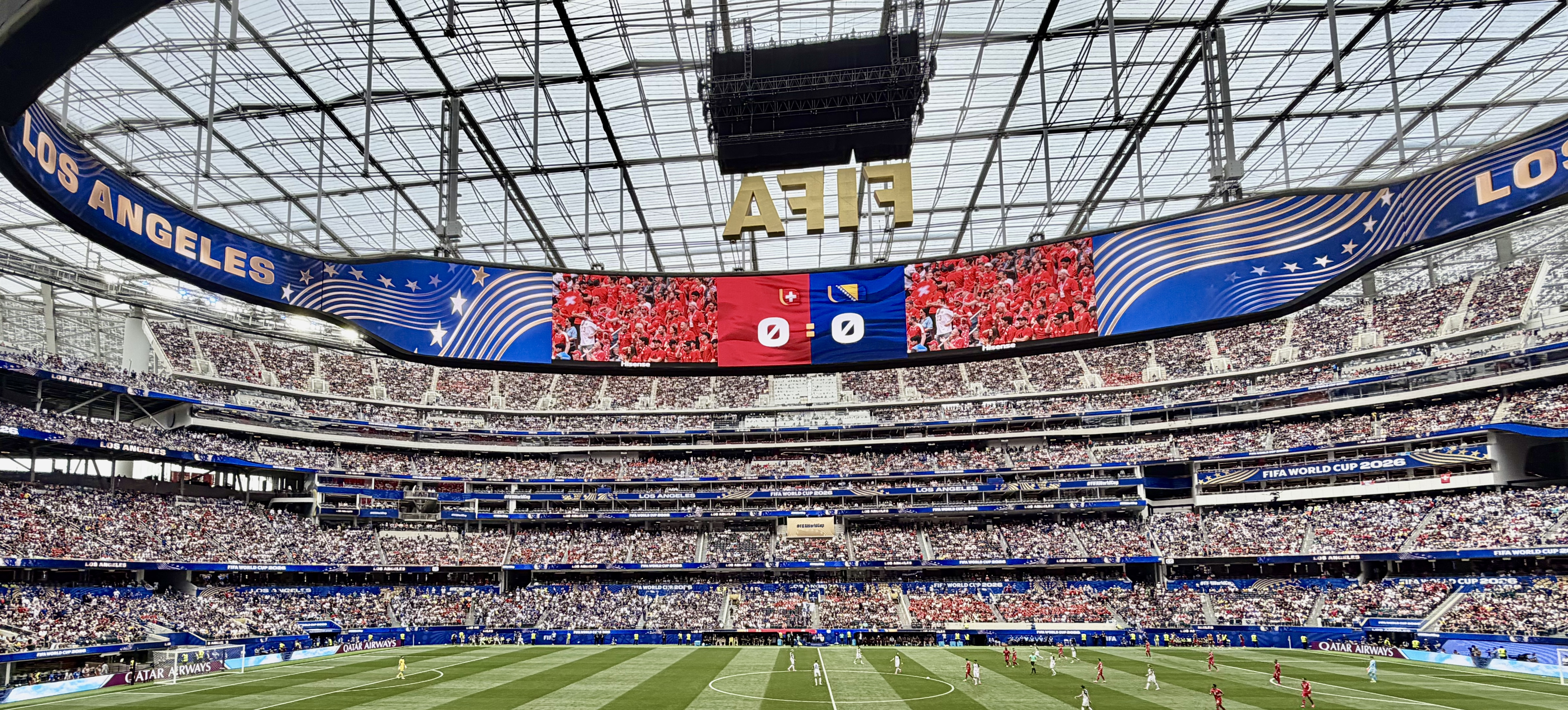
Midway in the Switzerland vs Bosnia and Herzegovina match

Edin Džeko and Sead Kolašinac lead Bosnia and Herzegovina in World Cup appearances, both standing as the only two players in Bosnia’s footballing history (as an independent nation from SFR Yugoslavia) to appear in two separate World Cups.

Rank	Player	Matches	World Cups
1	Edin Džeko	6	2014, 2026
1	Sead Kolašinac	6	2014, 2026
3	Kerim Alajbegović	4	2026
3	Esmir Bajraktarević	4	2026
3	Ermedin Demirović	4	2026
3	Nikola Katić	4	2026
3	Amar Memić	4	2026
3	Ivan Šunjić	4	2026
3	Benjamin Tahirović	4	2026
3	Nikola Vasilj	4	2026

=== Goalscorers ===
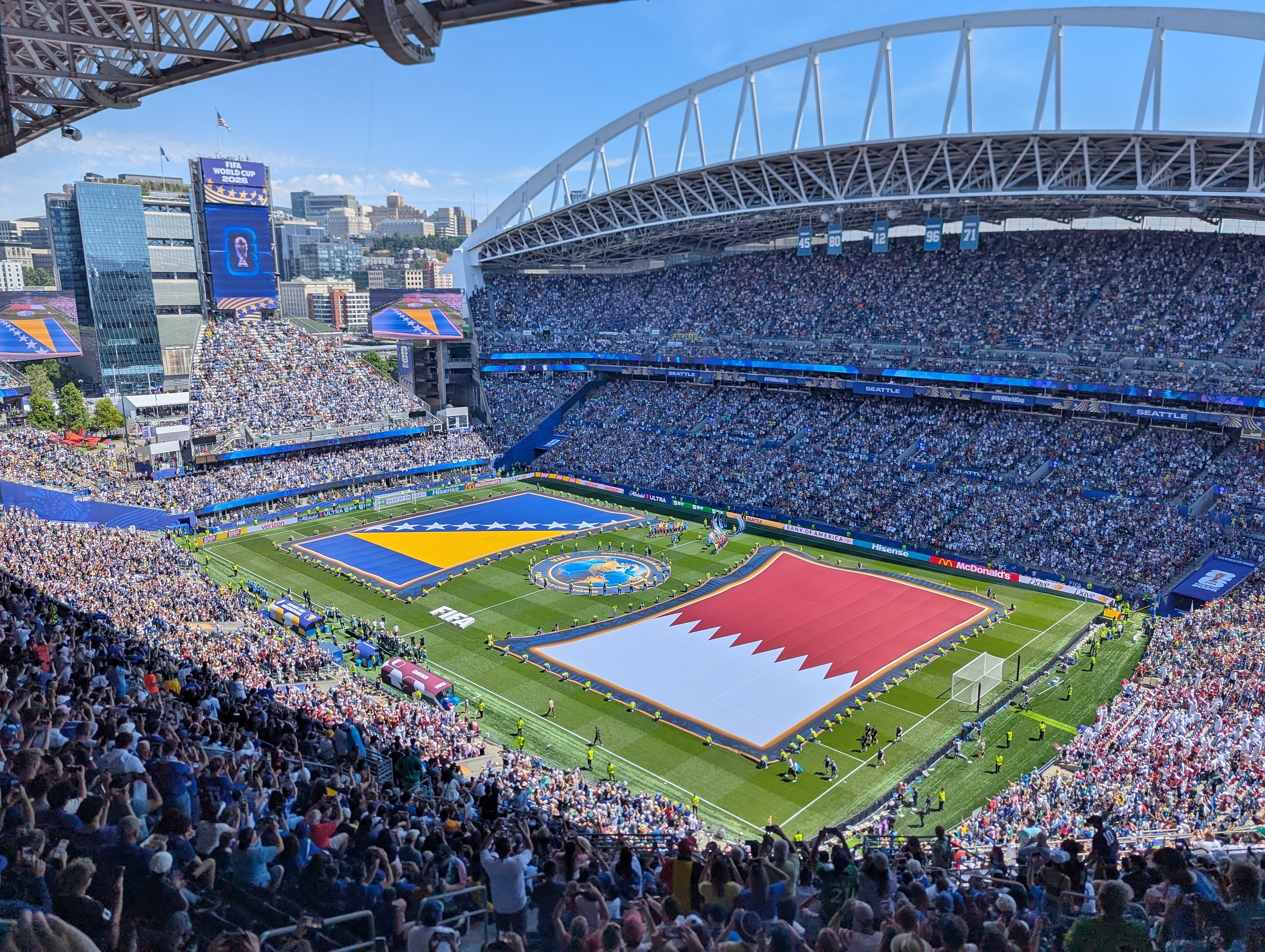
Seattle hosting Bosnia and Herzegovina v Qatar during 2026 FIFA World Cup.

On June 15th 2014, Vedad Ibišević made history by scoring Bosnia and Herzegovina's first-ever FIFA World Cup goal. He did so against Argentina in Rio de Janeiro.

Player	Goals	2014	2026
Ermin Mahmić	2		2
Vedad Ibišević	1	1	
Edin Džeko	1	1	
Miralem Pjanić	1	1	
Avdija Vršajević	1	1	
Jovo Lukić	1		1
Kerim Alajbegović	1		1
Own goals	1		1
Total	9	4	5

== Historical performances ==
The Bosnia-Herzegovina team records during its participation in the FIFA World Cup.

- 2014: On 15 June 2014, Vedad Ibišević made history by scoring Bosnia and Herzegovina's first-ever FIFA World Cup goal, coming on as substitute in their opening match defeat vs Argentina in Rio de Janeiro.
- 2014: Kolašinac's own goal (vs Argentina) after two minutes and nine seconds broke the record for the fastest own goal in the history of the FIFA World Cup, surpassing Carlos Gamarra's own goal (two minutes and 46 seconds) in Paraguay's first group stage match against England at the 2006 FIFA World Cup.
- 2014: Edin Džeko goal vs Nigeria was ruled out for offside, which replays later showed to be an incorrect decision. Referee Peter O'Leary later admitted Džeko's goal was disallowed in error.
- 2014: On 25 June 2014, a historic first victory in FIFA World Cup was recorded vs Iran.
- 2026: Second European team to play 2 host nations (Canada and the US) at single edition since Turkey in 2002 FIFA World Cup and third overall, the other being South Africa also in the 2026 edition.
- 2026: Edin Džeko is a first player to start a knock-outs match over age 40 (followed by Luka Modrić and Cristiano Ronaldo the following day; Vozinha two days later).
- 2026: Kerim Alajbegović at 18 years and 276 days old is 8th youngest goalscorer in World Cup tournament history, right behind legends like Pelé. Kerim's strike outside the box broke the previous record held by Kylian Mbappe (19 years and 207 days).
- 2026: On June 24 2026, Bosnia and Herzegovina victory over Qatar ensured a historic knockout berth as one of the eight best third-place teams.
- 2026: On July 1, 2026 in a round of 32 game between Bosnia and the US the match referee Raphael Claus issued a controversial red card following a VAR review to Balogun, which many including Tarik Muharemović (the player he had been involved in the initial incident with) considered excessive or illegitimate. Several experts compared the incident to that of Lionel Messi in the group stage game between Argentina vs Algeria, where he did not get a red card for the same offense on Aïssa Mandi, with some speculating that his status played a role in the decision. The automatic 1 game suspension for receiving a red card was overturned by FIFA following a call from United States President Donald Trump to FIFA President Gianni Infantino, prompting accusations of political manipulation from UEFA and others in the football world, including former FIFA President Sepp Blatter. As a result, Balogun would play in the United States vs Belgium match on 6 July 2026 in Seattle. The US team lost the match vs Belgium 1-4.

== See also ==
- Records for Yugoslavia
