= Sergio Romero =

Argentine footballer (born 1987)

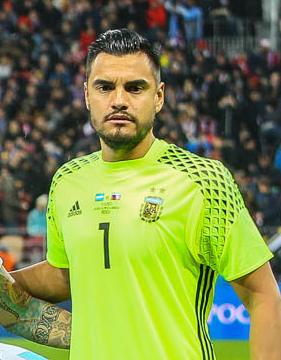
- Romero playing for Argentina in 2017

Personal information
- Full name: Sergio Germán Romero
- Date of birth: 22 February 1987 (age 39)
- Place of birth: Bernardo de Irigoyen, Misiones, Argentina
- Height: 1.92 m (6 ft 4 in)
- Position: Goalkeeper

Youth career
- 1996–1997: Almirante Brown
- 1997–2003: CAI
- 2003–2006: Racing Club

Senior career*
Years	Team	Apps	(Gls)
2006–2007	Racing Club	4	(0)
2007–2011	AZ	90	(0)
2011–2015	Sampdoria	71	(0)
2013–2014	→ Monaco (loan)	3	(0)
2015–2021	Manchester United	7	(0)
2021–2022	Venezia	16	(0)
2022–2025	Boca Juniors	39	(0)
2025	Argentinos Juniors	2	(0)
Total		232	(0)

International career
2007–2008	Argentina U20	23	(0)
2008	Argentina Olympic	4	(0)
2009–2018	Argentina	96	(0)
Medal record
Men's Football
Representing Argentina
FIFA U-20 World Cup
Winner	2007 Canada
Olympic Games
Gold medal – first place	2008 Beijing	Team
FIFA World Cup
Runner-up	2014 Brazil
Copa América
Runner-up	2015 Chile
Runner-up	2016 United States
- * Club domestic league appearances and goals

Sergio Germán "Chiquito" Romero (Spanish pronunciation: [ˈseɾxjo xeɾˈman roˈmeɾo]; born 22 February 1987) is an Argentine former professional footballer who played as a goalkeeper.

Romero made his debut with Racing Club in the Argentine Primera División in 2007 and then transferred to Dutch club AZ at the end of the season. He won the Eredivisie in 2009, and two years later joined Italian side Sampdoria. In 2013, Romero joined Monaco on a season-long loan. He signed for Manchester United in July 2015, largely serving as backup to David de Gea but playing in a series of important matches for the club. Romero was the starting goalkeeper through Manchester United's 2016–17 UEFA Europa League run, playing in the Final and keeping a clean sheet as the club defeated Ajax to win a fifth major European trophy in their history. He made 61 appearances for United across six seasons in total, later returning to Argentina with Boca Juniors in 2022, where he won the Argentine Primera División.

Romero is the most capped goalkeeper in the history of the Argentina national team, playing 96 times since his debut in 2009. He has represented Argentina at two World Cups and at three Copa América tournaments, finishing as runner-up in the 2014 FIFA World Cup, as well as in the 2015 and 2016 Copa América tournaments. He also was part of the team that won gold at the 2008 Olympics.

== Club career ==
=== Racing Club ===
Born in Bernardo de Irigoyen, Romero began his youth career at Almirante Brown and CAI before joining Racing Club.

Romero passed from the youth to the first team of Racing Club in 2006, making his debut in the Argentine Primera División. Romero appeared in the substitute bench throughout the 2005 season. Throughout the 2006 season, he continued to be in the substitute bench. Despite this, he signed his first professional contract with the club.

In the 2007 season, Romero found himself competing the first-choice goalkeeper role with José Luis Martínez Gullotta. Romero made his Racing Club debut of Matchday 1 of Torneo Apertura, in a 1–1 draw against Nueva Chicago. However, in the following match, Romero lost his first-choice goalkeeper role to Gustavo Campagnuolo and spent two months on the sidelines. Weeks after signing for AZ when he moved in the summer, Romero made his first appearance in two months on 14 April 2007 against Colón, in a 1–1 draw; followed up by another appearance on 22 April 2007, in a 3–3 draw against Belgrano. After Campagnuolo suffered an injury, Romero made his last appearance for the club on 17 June 2007, in a 4–2 win over Godoy Cruz.

=== AZ ===
==== 2007–08 season ====
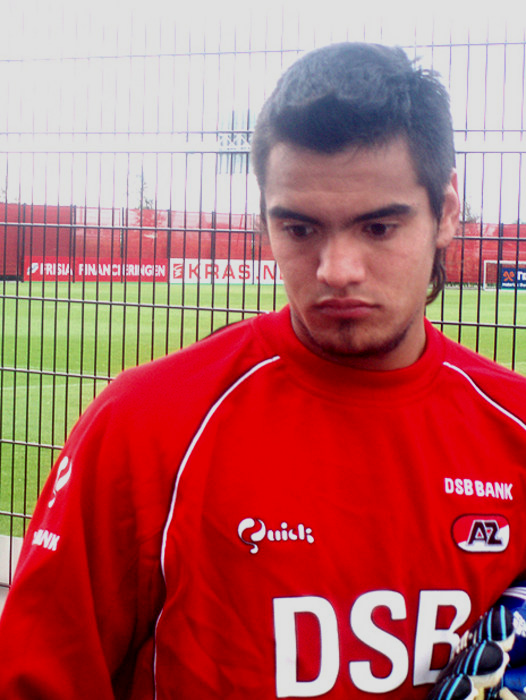
Sergio Romero with AZ in 2007

It was announced on 24 March 2007 that Romero signed for AZ, who were managed by Louis van Gaal when he joined the club on 1 July. There, Romero was expected to fight for the first-choice goalkeeper role with Boy Waterman.

After an injury to Waterman, Romero made his Eredivisie debut on 30 September 2007 against Heracles, during which he conceded a penalty, and AZ lost 2–1. In his second match of the season against Twente on 23 February 2008, he kept his first clean sheet for the side, in a 0–0 draw. From that moment on, Romero became a regular in the team, with AZ finishing 11th.

==== 2008–09 season ====
In 2008–09, Romero established himself as first-choice goalkeeper at AZ following the departure of Waterman to Den Haag. Romero kept a 950-minute clean sheet for AZ from November 2008 to February 2009. While keeping a clean sheet Romero signed a new contract with the club, keeping him there until 2012. On 5 March 2009, in the quarter-finals of the KNVB Cup, he made a mistake which allowed Breda's Nourdin Boukhari to score, as AZ were beaten 2–1. After the defeat, he broke the bones in his hand by punching the door and walls of his team's changing room in frustration, an injury which ruled him out of the team at a crucial stage of the season. While on the side-lines, AZ won the Eredivisie in the 2008–09 season. He returned on 26 April 2009 after Joey Didulica was injured in a clash with Luis Suárez, playing 16 minutes of a 1–1 draw against Ajax. Romero ended the 2008–09 season having made 31 appearances in all competitions.

==== 2009–10 season ====
The 2009–10 season marked the departure of Van Gaal to Bayern Munich. Romero was linked with a move away from AZ, with Juventus and Bayern Munich keen on signing him, but stayed at the club throughout the summer. Romero started the season well in the Johan Cruyff Shield, when he helped AZ win 5–1 against Heerenveen to win the title. Continuing to be first-choice goalkeeper, Romero made his UEFA Champions League debut on Matchday 1 of the Group Stage in a 0–1 loss against Olympiacos. However, a week later, he suffered a knee injury that side-lined him for a week. A week later on 3 October 2009 he returned to the first team from injury in a 1–0 win over Breda. Later in the season Romero suffered a further injury which caused him to be substituted in the first half of a 1–0 win over Sparta Rotterdam on 21 March 2010. It was announced that this injury would rule Romero out for the remainder of the season, putting his place in the 2010 World Cup in doubt. Despite his injuries, by the end of the 2009–10 season Romero had made 36 appearances in all competitions.

==== 2010–11 season ====
Romero missed the start of the season the 2010–11 season, due to international commitment and injury, eventually making his first appearance of the season on 19 September 2010 in a 1–0 win over NEC. Eleven days later, on 30 September 2010, Romero made his UEFA Europa League debut in a 1–4 loss against BATE Borisov in the Group Stage. By February, Romero was out of the first team for the second time that season, due to international commitment and ankle injury. After spending a month on the side-lines, Romero returned to the first team on 2 April 2011 in a 1–0 win over Feyenoord. At the end of the 2010–11 season, Romero had made 31 appearances in all competitions, helping AZ to 4th place in the league and qualification into the Europa League.

At the start of the 2011–12 season Romero was criticised by manager Gertjan Verbeek for his unprofessional attitude, having failed to return to the club following the conclusion of 2011 Copa América. As a result, Romero was dropped from the AZ squad until the transfer window finished. He later joined Sampdoria on 22 August 2011.

=== Sampdoria ===
==== 2011–12 season ====
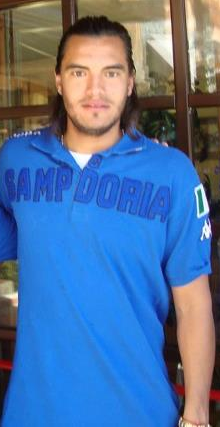
Romero pictured during his time at Sampdoria in 2012

On 22 August 2011, Romero was signed for €2.1 million on a 4-year contract by Sampdoria, which had been relegated the previous season to Serie B. Upon joining the club, Romero said his aim is to help the club reach promotion to Serie A.

Romero made his debut four days later at home against Padova in the opening match of the season, in a 2–2 draw. Despite being a first team regular, Romero missed several matches by the first half of the season due to international commitment as well as injury and suspension. Romero managed to regain his first choice goalkeeper role until he suffered injuries around April. The season ended with Sampdoria in sixth place, and after victories over Sassuolo and Varese in the playoffs, which he played once, due to his own international commitment, and they earned promotion to Serie A. In his first season at Sampdoria, Romero finished his first season, making 30 appearances in all competitions.

==== 2012–13 season ====
In his second season at Sampdoria, Romero continued to remain a first choice goalkeeper this season following the injury of second choice goalkeeper, Angelo da Costa Júnior. Romero then made his Serie A debut, in the opening match of the season, where he kept a clean sheet, in a 1–0 win over Milan. However, in a match against Parma on 21 October 2012, Romero was sent-off in the 34th minute for conceding a penalty, in a 1–2 loss. At the end of the 2012–13 season, Romero went on to make 33 appearances in all competitions despite appearing on the substitute for the last three remaining league matches amid to rumors of leaving the club. However, this was denied by Romero, who stated that he is committed to stay at the club.

==== 2013–14 season: Loan to Monaco ====
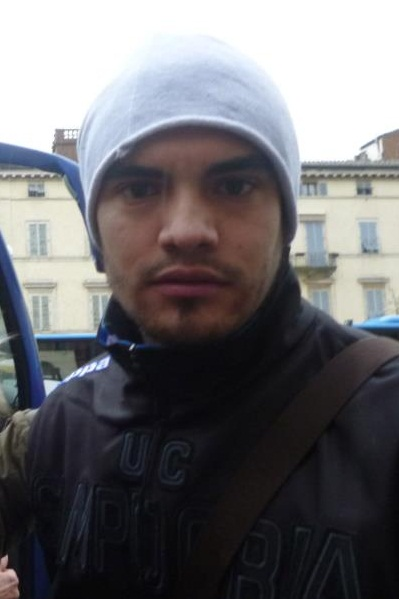
Romero pictured before the Serie A match between Siena-Sampdoria on 20 January 2013

For the 2013–14 season, Romero was loaned to Monaco of Ligue 1. Romero later reflected his move to Monaco, stating that he doesn't regret his choices. Romero made his Monaco debut, in the third round of Coupe da La League, in a 0–1 loss against Reims on 30 October 2013. It wasn't until on 12 April 2014 when he made his league debut, in a 1–0 win over Rennes. Second choice behind Danijel Subašić, he played three league matches as the team finished as runners-up to Paris Saint-Germain, but was first choice in the cup competitions, playing six times.

==== 2014–15 season ====
After his return to Sampdoria, he was most often the backup to Emiliano Viviano. But following Viviano's injury, Romero had an opportunity when he made his first appearance on 19 October 2014, in a 2–2 draw against Cagliari. Romero had a handful of first team opportunities playing throughout 2014 until Viviano return in early 2015. In the January transfer window, Romero's lack of first team opportunities prompted him to decide to leave the club in January, but this never happened. From that moment on, Romero returned as a second choice goalkeeper and never played again. At the end of the 2014–15 season, Romero went on to make eleven appearances in all competitions.

Following this, Romero was released by the club at the end of the 2014–15 season when his contract came to an end, which he confirmed his release on 6 June 2015. It came after when the club allowed Romero to leave the club at the end of the season.

=== Manchester United ===
==== 2015–16 season ====
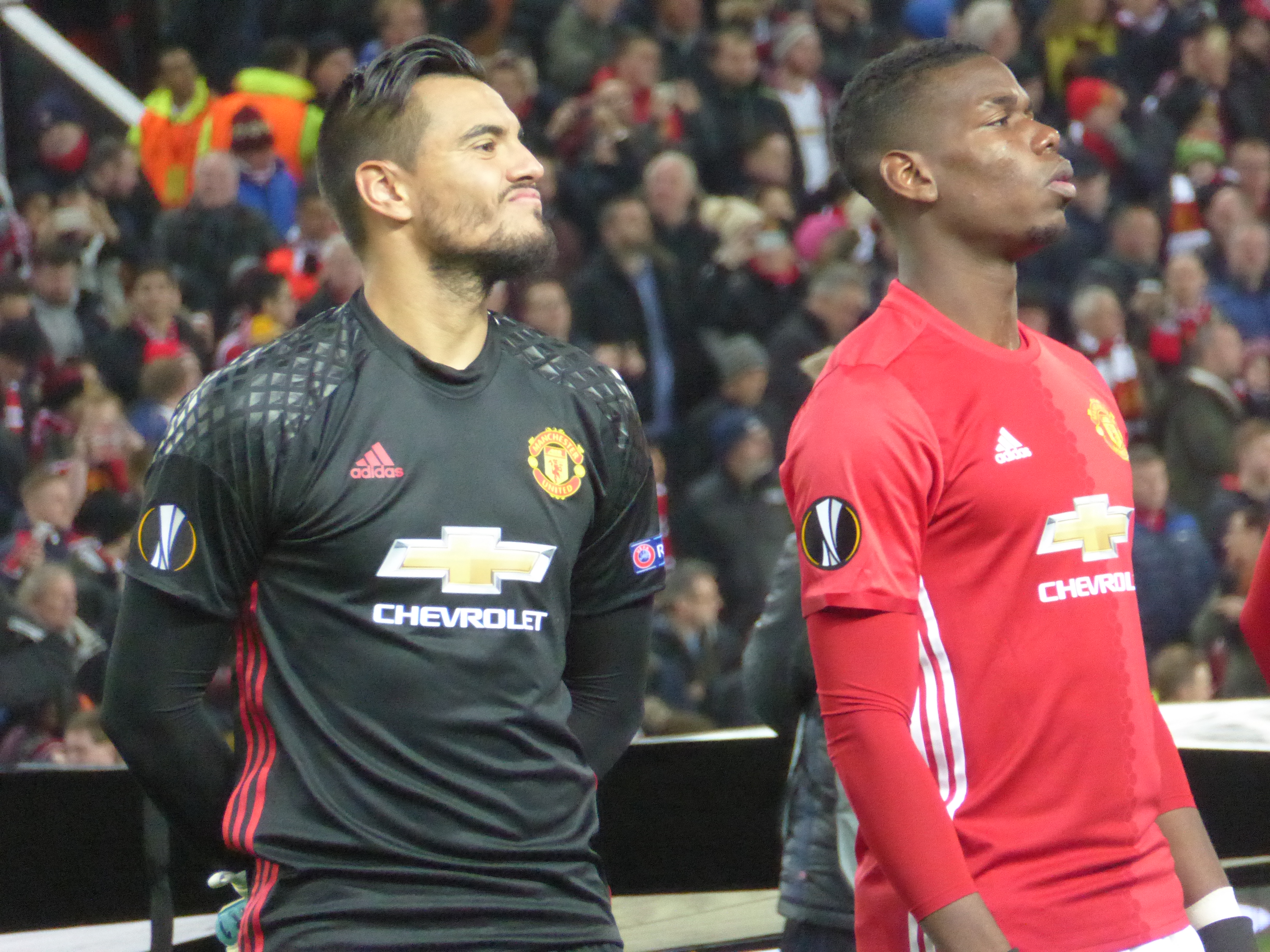
Romero and Paul Pogba ahead of a UEFA Europa League match against Feyenoord on 24 November 2016

On 27 July 2015, Manchester United completed the signing of Romero on a free transfer. He penned a three-year contract, with the option to extend for a further year, and reunited with his former AZ manager Louis van Gaal. Upon joining the club, Romero was given the number 20 shirt, saying: "There was a misunderstanding between myself and the manager, Van Gaal. He asked me what squad number I wanted, and I said 22. But he must have thought I'd said 21 because he told me if I wanted that number, I would have to go and speak with Ander Herrera. Anyway, it turned out Nick Powell had recently changed to 22, so I just said that no.20 would do fine".

With David de Gea withdrawn from the squad amidst transfer speculation, and Víctor Valdés out of favour with manager Van Gaal, Romero made his Premier League debut on 8 August 2015, as the season opened with a 1–0 victory against Tottenham Hotspur at Old Trafford. His distribution was described as "nervy" but produced two crucial saves that helped United win the match. He did not concede in his first three league matches for United. After de Gea failed to leave the club in the summer, he returned to the first team, which resulted in Romero becoming the second choice goalkeeper. Despite this, Romero was first choice in cup competitions.

==== 2016–17 season ====
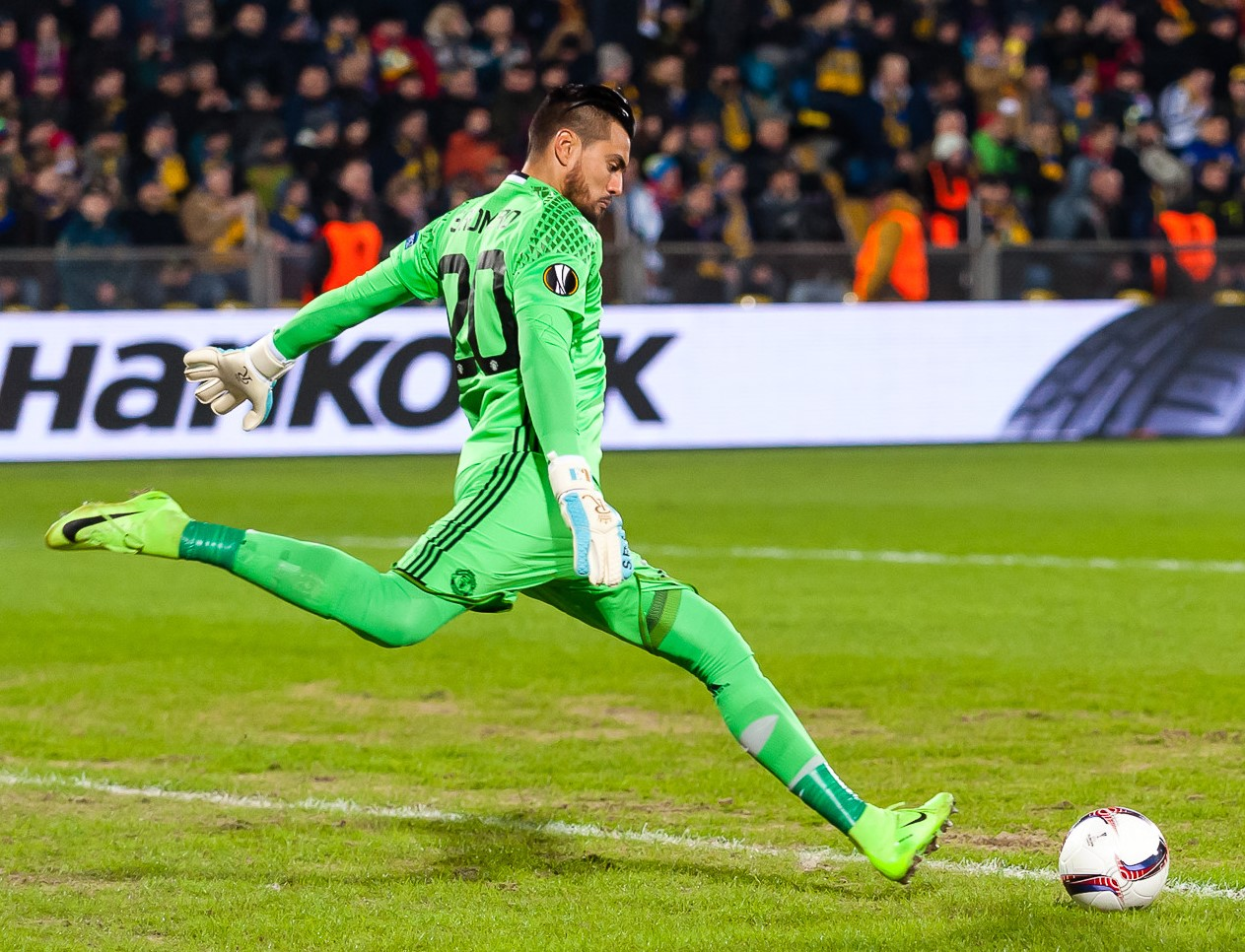
Romero during a Europa League match in March 2017

In his second season at Manchester United, Romero continued to be the first choice goalkeeper in cup competitions, including the club's Europa League campaign, which new manager José Mourinho explained that he deserved to play in. Romero kept his first clean sheet of the season on 29 September 2016, in a 1–0 win over Zorya Luhansk. Romero's performance in a 4–0 win over Feyenoord was praised by pundits. Following this, Romero kept three more clean sheets in the UEFA Europa League matches, in which he kept two in both legs against Saint-Étienne. In the second leg of a match against Rostov, Romero made a crucial save from Christian Noboa's free-kick, which helped Manchester United progress to the next round. Romero rejected a move back to his homeland with Boca Juniors in the January transfer window. Manager Mourinho dismissed speculation of both Romero and De Gea leaving, stating: "I expect both to stay, because I think both are equally important... I cannot have a better replacement than Sergio. I cannot have a better professional than Sergio." Romero played in the 2017 Europa League final in which he kept a clean sheet in a 2–0 victory over Ajax.

==== 2017–18 season ====
On 16 July 2017, Romero was reported to have signed contract extension with the Manchester United until 2021.

==== 2019–20 season ====
On 12 December 2019, during his 50th appearance for the club, he kept a clean sheet in a 4–0 victory over his former club AZ during a Europa League group stage match, bringing his total number of clean sheets to 31 in 50 matches, equating to 62% of his games for the club.

==== 2020–21 season ====
After not featuring for the whole of the 2020–21 season, on 4 June 2021, Romero was set to become a free agent due to the expiration of his contract, after Manchester United releasing a list of players who were being released at the end of June. Throughout his 6 seasons with the club, mostly playing as the second fiddle to De Gea, and mainly as the goalkeeper for the cup matches, he played 61 matches in all competitions and kept 39 clean sheets.

=== Venezia ===
On 11 October 2021, Venezia signed Romero on a free transfer.

=== Boca Juniors ===
On 8 August 2022, Romero returned to Argentina after 15 years playing in Europe, and signed a two-and-a-half-year contract with Boca Juniors. On 6 June 2024, he extended his contract with the club until December 2025. In March 2026, Romero retired from professional football.

== International career ==
=== Youth career ===
Romero represented Argentina at the 2007 South American Youth Championship in Paraguay and at the 2007 FIFA U-20 World Cup in Canada where on 8 August 2007 Romero was first included in the Argentine selection for a friendly match against Norway and against Australia, which Argentina also went on to win.

After being called up by Sergio Batista for the Olympics, He replaced injured Oscar Ustari at the 2008 Summer Olympics football tournament. Prior to that, Romero played in the 2006 Toulon Tournament, where they were eliminated in the group stage.

=== Senior career ===
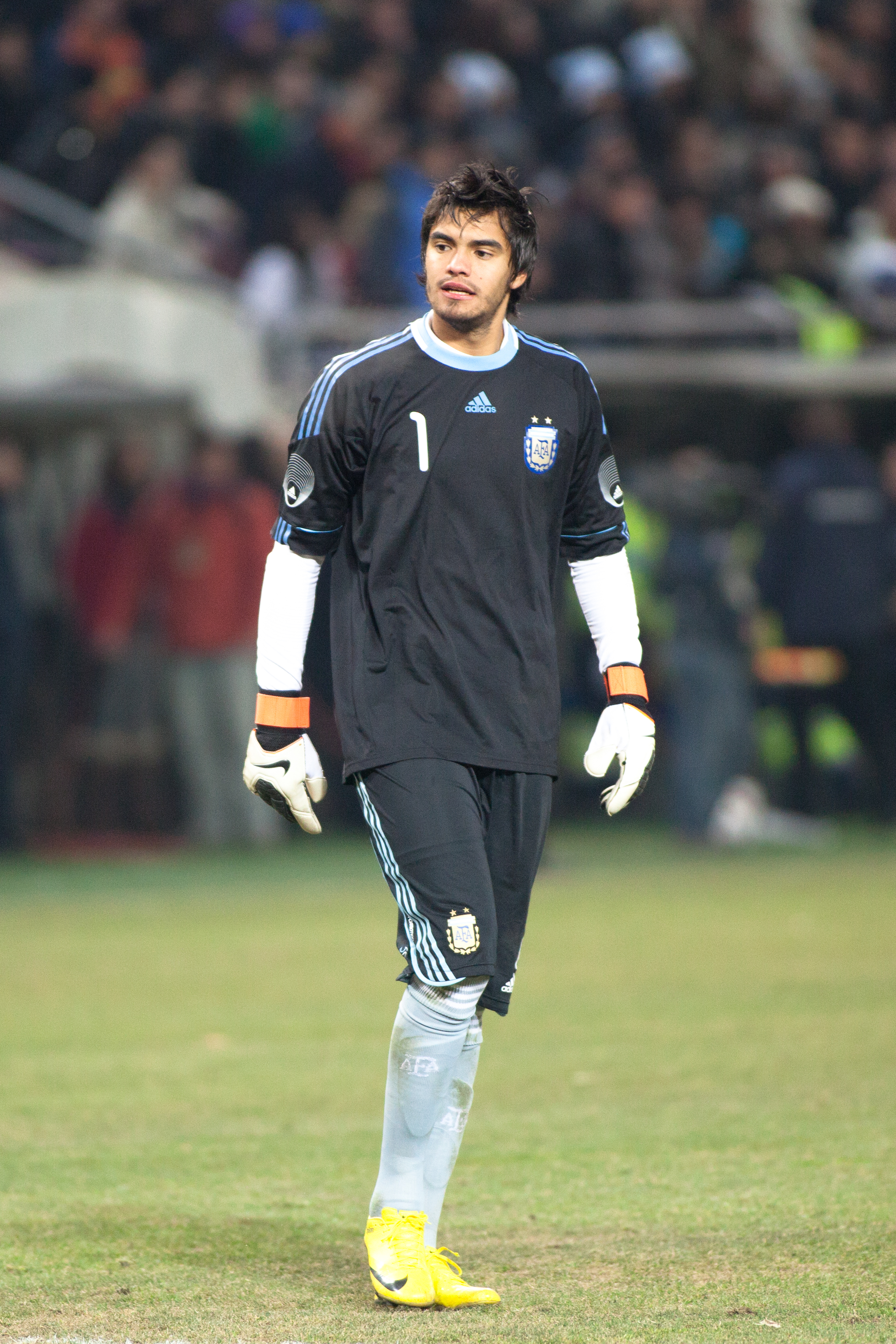
Romero in action against Portugal on 9 February 2011

Romero was called up to the full senior side by then coach Diego Maradona debuting on 9 September 2009 in a 0–1 2010 FIFA World Cup qualifying loss against Paraguay and playing in the win against Uruguay in Montevideo that saw Argentina qualify for the 2010 FIFA World Cup. He played in all five of Argentina's World Cup matches which ended in the quarter-final defeat, during which Romero found himself competing for the first choice goalkeeper role with Juan Pablo Carrizo.

Prior to the 2010 FIFA World Cup, Romero's place in the World Cup was in doubt as result of suffering an injury, whilst at AZ. But Romero managed recover from injury and was included in the squad. Romero played his first World Cup match in the Group Stage against Nigeria, where he kept a clean sheet, in a 1–0 victory. Romero continued to remain the first choice goalkeeper throughout the World Cup campaign until their elimination in a 0–4 loss against Germany.

Romero was part of Sergio Batista's Copa América squad in which Argentina, the hosts, lost to eventual winners Uruguay on penalties in the quarter-finals. During the tournament, Romero kept two clean sheets against Colombia and Costa Rica. He retained his position as number one choice under new coach Alejandro Sabella for the ongoing 2014 FIFA World Cup qualifiers.

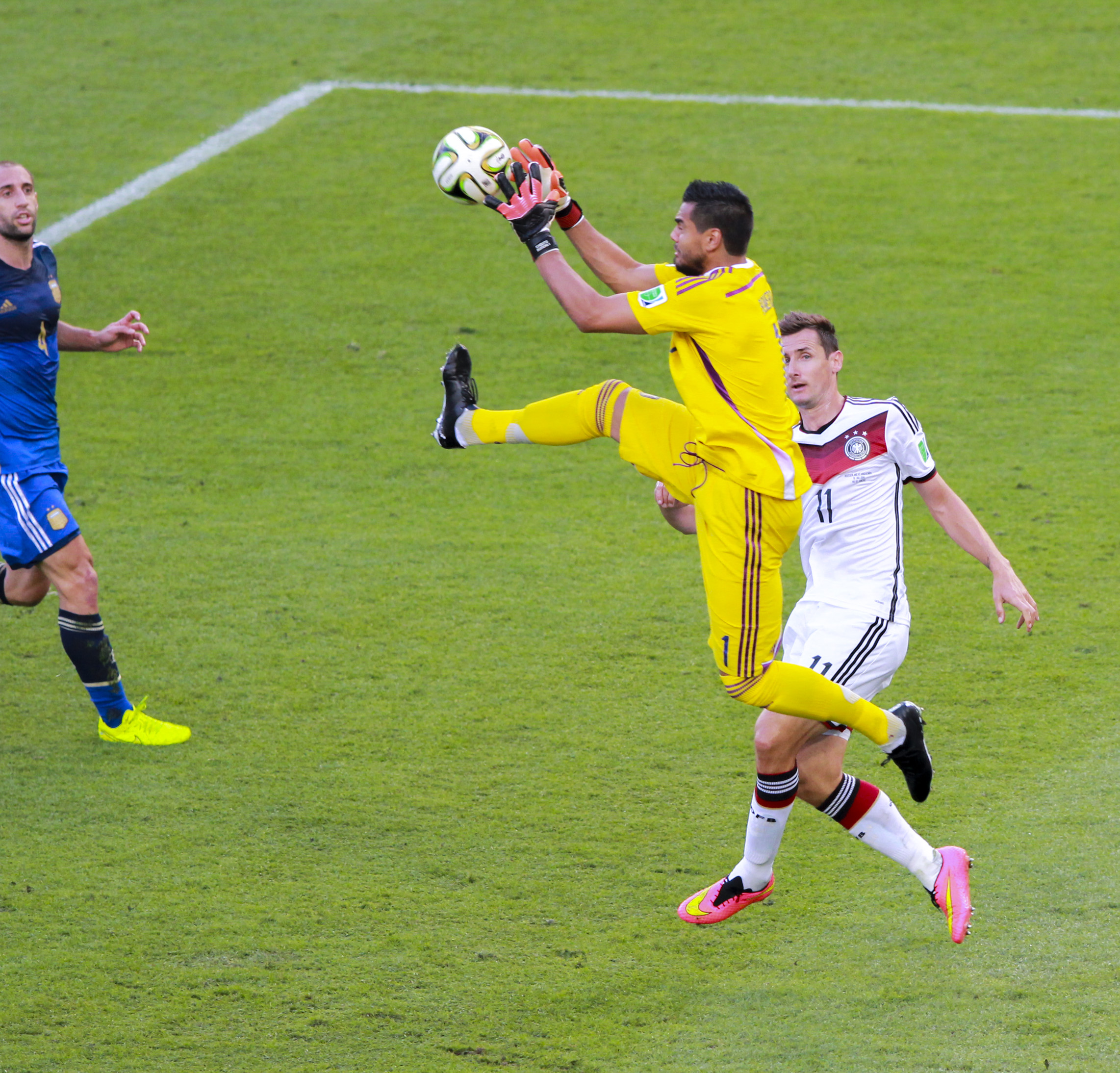
Romero making a save during the 2014 FIFA World Cup Final

Romero was Argentina's starting goalkeeper at the 2014 FIFA World Cup despite lack of first team opportunities whilst at Monaco. In the semi-final, he earned himself Man of the Match by saving kicks from Ron Vlaar and Wesley Sneijder as Argentina defeated the Netherlands 4–2 in a penalty shoot-out to reach the 2014 FIFA World Cup Final on 13 July, where they lost 0–1 to Germany. On 11 July 2014, Romero was named on the three-man shortlist for FIFA's Golden Glove award for the tournament's best goalkeeper due to his performances that led his team to the final.

At the 2015 Copa América, Romero saved from Juan Camilo Zúñiga in the penalty shoot-out at the end of Argentina's goalless quarter-final against Colombia in Viña del Mar; although three takers did not score their penalties, this was the only save.

On 21 May 2018, Romero was named in Argentina's squad for the 2018 FIFA World Cup in Russia by manager Jorge Sampaoli, but was later ruled out of the tournament due to a knee injury suffered the day after the announcement.

== Personal life ==
Despite being 6 feet 4 inches (1.93 m) tall, Romero is nicknamed "Chiquito" as he is relatively short compared to his brothers, in particular his professional basketball-playing brother Diego, who is 6 feet 9 inches (2.06 m) tall.

He is married to fellow Argentine Eliana Guercio, they have four children together.

== Career statistics ==
=== Club ===
Appearances and goals by club, season and competition
Club	Season	League			National cup (Note: Includes KNVB Cup, Coppa Italia, Coupe de France, FA Cup, Copa Argentina)		League cup (Note: Includes Coupe de la Ligue, Football League/EFL Cup, Copa de la Liga Profesional)		Continental		Other		Total	
Club	Season	Division	Apps	Goals	Apps	Goals	Apps	Goals	Apps	Goals	Apps	Goals	Apps	Goals
Racing Club	2005–06	Argentine Primera División	0	0	0	0	—		—		—		0	0
Racing Club	2006–07	Argentine Primera División	4	0	0	0	—		—		—		4	0
Racing Club	Total		4	0	—		—		—		—		4	0
AZ	2007–08	Eredivisie	12	0	0	0	—		2 (Note: Appearances in UEFA Cup)	0	—		14	0
AZ	2008–09	Eredivisie	28	0	1	0	—		—		—		29	0
AZ	2009–10	Eredivisie	27	0	1	0	—		6 (Note: Appearance(s) in UEFA Champions League)	0	1 (Note: Appearance in Johan Cruyff Shield)	0	35	0
AZ	2010–11	Eredivisie	23	0	3	0	—		5 (Note: Appearances in UEFA Europa League)	0	—		31	0
AZ	Total		90	0	5	0	—		13	0	1	0	109	0
Sampdoria	2011–12	Serie B	29	0	—		—		—		1 (Note: Appearance in Serie B promotion play-off)	0	30	0
Sampdoria	2012–13	Serie A	32	0	1	0	—		—		—		33	0
Sampdoria	2013–14	Serie A	0	0	0	0	—		—		—		0	0
Sampdoria	2014–15	Serie A	10	0	1	0	—		—		—		11	0
Sampdoria	Total		71	0	2	0	—		—		1	0	74	0
Monaco (loan)	2013–14	Ligue 1	3	0	5	0	1	0	—		—		9	0
Manchester United	2015–16	Premier League	4	0	1	0	1	0	4 (Note: Two appearances in UEFA Champions League, two appearances in UEFA Europa League)	0	—		10	0
Manchester United	2016–17	Premier League	2	0	3	0	1	0	12	0	0	0	18	0
Manchester United	2017–18	Premier League	1	0	4	0	3	0	2	0	0	0	10	0
Manchester United	2018–19	Premier League	0	0	4	0	1	0	1	0	—		6	0
Manchester United	2019–20	Premier League	0	0	5	0	3	0	9	0	—		17	0
Manchester United	2020–21	Premier League	0	0	0	0	0	0	0	0	—		0	0
Manchester United	Total		7	0	17	0	9	0	28	0	0	0	61	0
Venezia	2021–22	Serie A	16	0	0	0	—		—		—		16	0
Boca Juniors	2022	Argentine Primera División	0	0	0	0	—		—		0	0	0	0
Boca Juniors	2023	Argentine Primera División	23	0	4	0	9	0	13 (Note: Appearances in Copa Libertadores)	0	0	0	49	0
Boca Juniors	2024	Argentine Primera División	16	0	1	0	13	0	9 (Note: Appearances in Copa Sudamericana)	0	—		39	0
Boca Juniors	Total		39	0	5	0	22	0	22	0	—		88	0
Argentinos Juniors	2025	Argentine Primera División	2	0	2	0	—		—		—		4	0
Career total			232	0	36	0	32	0	63	0	2	0	365	0

=== International ===
Appearances and goals by national team and year
National team	Year	Apps	Goals
Argentina	2009	4	0
Argentina	2010	11	0
Argentina	2011	10	0
Argentina	2012	9	0
Argentina	2013	10	0
Argentina	2014	13	0
Argentina	2015	13	0
Argentina	2016	15	0
Argentina	2017	8	0
Argentina	2018	3	0
Total		96	0

== Honours ==
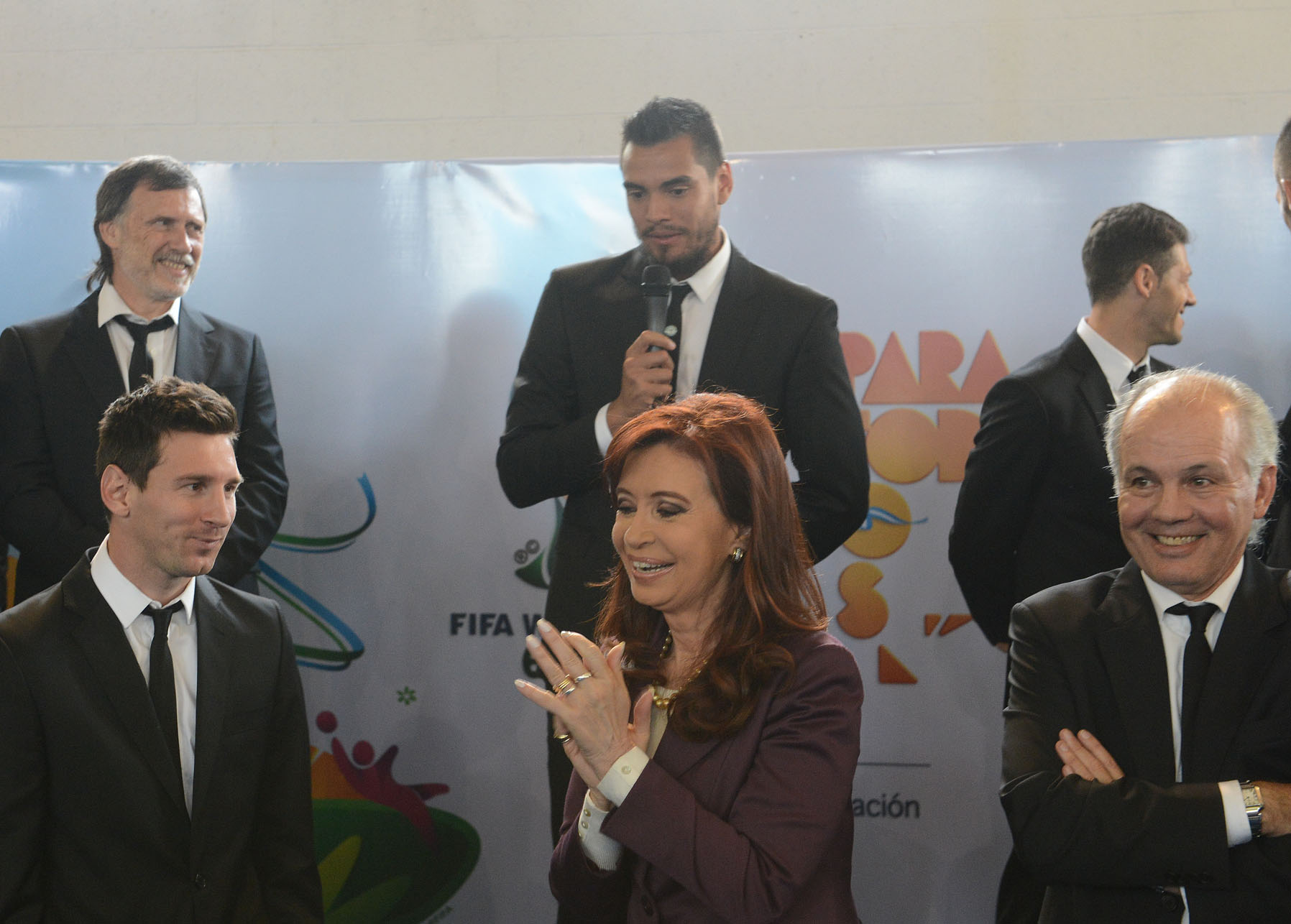
Romero (rear, centre) and other members of the team meet President of Argentina Cristina Fernández de Kirchner at the Casa Rosada after the 2014 FIFA World Cup Final.

AZ

- Eredivisie: 2008–09
- Johan Cruyff Shield: 2009

Manchester United

- FA Cup: 2015–16; runner-up: 2017–18
- EFL Cup: 2016–17
- FA Community Shield: 2016
- UEFA Europa League: 2016–17

Boca Juniors

- Supercopa Argentina: 2022
- Copa Libertadores runner-up: 2023

Argentinos Juniors

- Copa Argentina runner-up: 2025

Argentina U20

- FIFA U-20 World Cup: 2007

Argentina Olympic

- Olympic Games Gold Medal: 2008

Argentina

- FIFA World Cup runner-up: 2014
- Copa América runner-up: 2015, 2016

Individual

- UEFA Europa League Squad of the Season: 2016–17
- Copa Libertadores Team of the Tournament: 2023
