= Wally Martinez Gullotta =

Argentine footballer

Personal information
- Full name: José Luis Martínez Gullotta
- Date of birth: January 12, 1984 (age 42)
- Place of birth: San Rafael, Argentina
- Height: 1.86 m (6 ft 1 in)
- Position: Goalkeeper

Team information
- Current team: San Martín Tucumán

Youth career
- Racing Club

Senior career*
Years	Team	Apps	(Gls)
2006–2007	→ Juventud Antoniana (loan)	18	(0)
2006–2010	Racing Club	19	(0)
2010–2011	Gimnasia de Jujuy	0	(0)
2011–2012	Aldosivi	2	(0)
2012–2015	Boca Unidos	32	(0)
2015–	San Martín Tucumán		
- * Club domestic league appearances and goals as of 28 April 2015

José Luis "Wally" Martínez Gullotta (born 12 January 1984 in San Rafael, Mendoza Province) is an Argentine football goalkeeper currently playing for San Martín Tucumán.

== Career ==
He filled in as the starting goaltender at the end of Torneo Clausura 2008 due to injuries to the top two Racing goaltenders. He kept the starting job into the beginning part of Apertura 2008 until being removed in favor of Pablo Migliore.

In 2010, he was released from Racing and joined second division side Gimnasia y Esgrima de Jujuy.
