= Edin Džeko =

Bosnian footballer (born 1986)

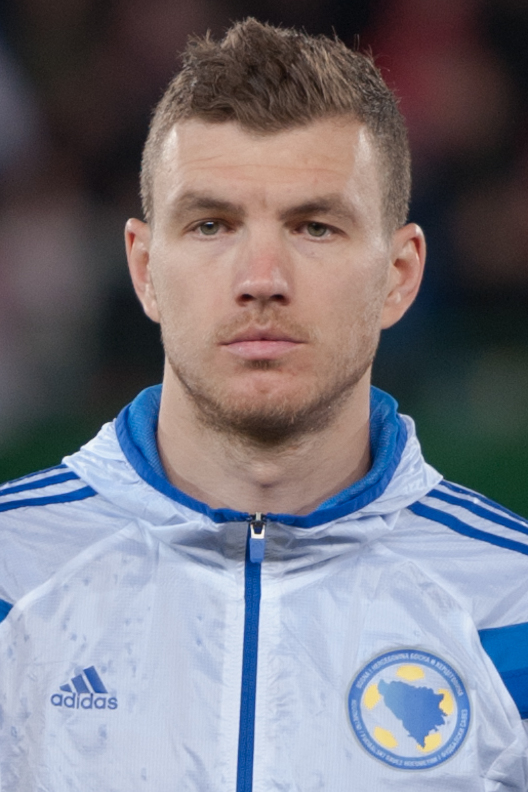
- Džeko with Bosnia and Herzegovina in 2015

Personal information
- Full name: Edin Džeko
- Date of birth: 17 March 1986 (age 40)
- Place of birth: Sarajevo, SR Bosnia and Herzegovina, SFR Yugoslavia
- Height: 1.93 m (6 ft 4 in)
- Position: Striker

Team information
- Current team: Schalke 04
- Number: 10

Youth career
- 1996–2003: Željezničar

Senior career*
Years	Team	Apps	(Gls)
2003–2005	Željezničar	35	(3)
2005–2007	Teplice	43	(16)
2005–2006	→ Ústí nad Labem (loan)	15	(6)
2007–2011	VfL Wolfsburg	111	(66)
2011–2016	Manchester City	130	(50)
2015–2016	→ Roma (loan)	31	(8)
2016–2021	Roma	168	(77)
2021–2023	Inter Milan	69	(22)
2023–2025	Fenerbahçe	71	(35)
2025–2026	Fiorentina	11	(0)
2026–	Schalke 04	18	(6)

International career
2003–2004	Bosnia and Herzegovina U19	5	(0)
2006–2007	Bosnia and Herzegovina U21	5	(1)
2007–2026	Bosnia and Herzegovina	152	(73)
- * Club domestic league appearances and goals as of 20:28, 8 November 2026 (UTC)

Edin Džeko (Bosnian pronunciation: [ědin dʒêːko]; born 17 March 1986) is a Bosnian professional footballer who plays as a striker for Bundesliga club Schalke 04. Nicknamed the "Bosnian Diamond" (Bosnian: Bosanski dijamant) or simply the "Diamond" (Dijamant), he is widely regarded as one of the best strikers of his generation. Having scored over 450 senior career goals for club and country, Džeko is also the all-time top goalscorer and most-capped player in the history of the Bosnia and Herzegovina national team. In addition, he is one of the few men's footballers with over 1,050 career appearances (the first Bosnian to achieve the feat, since the time matches have been recorded). He currently ranks as the ninth-highest goalscorer across all UEFA club competitions, with 67 goals.

Džeko began his professional career at Željezničar in 2003. He then joined Czech side Teplice in 2005, who briefly loaned him out to Ústí nad Labem. Prior to joining Schalke, Džeko played for Manchester City, Roma, Inter Milan, Fenerbahçe and Fiorentina, but first made a name for himself while with German side VfL Wolfsburg, with whom he won the club's first-ever Bundesliga title in the 2008–09 season; he was the second-highest scorer in the league with 26 goals. In the following season, Džeko was then the Bundesliga top scorer with 22 goals. He also registered ten assists in both campaigns. Džeko then signed for Manchester City, where he notably scored four goals during a 2011–12 Premier League match against Tottenham Hotspur at White Hart Lane. On the final day of that season, he scored an equaliser against Queens Park Rangers in the 92nd minute, before Sergio Agüero got the winning goal for City moments later, ensuring the team won a league title for the first time in 44 years. After lifting a second Premier League title in 2014, Džeko joined Roma in 2015, initially on loan, and finished as the top scorer of the 2016–17 Serie A season with 29 goals. On 3 March 2018, he scored his 50th league goal for the club, thus becoming the first player ever to record 50 goals in three of Europe's top five major leagues.

A former youth international for Bosnia and Herzegovina, Džeko made his senior international debut in 2007. He was named the team's captain in 2014, and went on to earn 152 caps and score 73 goals before retiring in 2026. He became the nation's all-time top scorer on 7 September 2012 in a win against Liechtenstein, recording a hat-trick to surpass Zvjezdan Misimović and Elvir Bolić. On 11 September 2018, he made his 95th appearance for Bosnia against Austria, surpassing Emir Spahić to become the country's most-capped player. Džeko helped his national team qualify for the 2014 FIFA World Cup, their first major international tournament, scoring ten goals in the qualifying campaign. Twelve years later, Džeko's six goals helped lead Bosnia to a second World Cup qualification for the 2026 edition, secured shortly after his 40th birthday.

== Club career ==
=== Early career ===
Džeko began his career at Željezničar, playing as a midfielder between 2003 and 2005, but with little success playing in that position. He was regarded as too tall, and with poor technical abilities. Džeko's coach at the time though, Jiří Plíšek, saw his potential and when Plíšek returned home, he advised Teplice to buy him. Željezničar accepted a bid of just €25,000 for Džeko, one of Željezničar's directors saying years later, "[we] thought we won the lottery".

Džeko had a loan spell with Ústí nad Labem in 2005, during which he scored six goals in 15 games. Later that year, he moved back to Teplice, staying there until 2007. With 13 goals in 30 games, he was the second-top goalscorer of the Czech League in the 2006–07 season. Due to his performances, VfL Wolfsburg manager Felix Magath signed him for €4 million.

=== VfL Wolfsburg ===
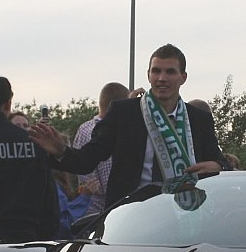
Džeko celebrating the 2008–09 Bundesliga title with VfL Wolfsburg

After moving to Wolfsburg, Džeko scored five goals and recorded three assists in his first 11 games: he was named by Sportal as the best striker in the first half of the 2007–08 Bundesliga season. During his first season in Germany, Wolfsburg finished in fifth place, qualifying for a UEFA Cup spot for the following season. Džeko finished the 2007–08 season with eight goals and seven assists in 17 games started.

After Wolfsburg acquired fellow Bosnian international Zvjezdan Misimović in July 2008, Džeko's performances improved significantly. During the first half of the 2008–09 Bundesliga season Džeko scored five goals and added seven assists, but after the winter break he added 21 goals and three more assists. This upturn was especially visible during their ten-game winning streak from 7 February to 26 April, in which he scored 11 goals and added an assist. In May 2009 Džeko scored a hat-trick against Hoffenheim, and did so again two weeks later against Hannover 96, contributing 26 goals and 10 assists overall in 32 league matches. His goal tally was second only to teammate Grafite, with whom he formed the most successful strike duo in Bundesliga history; Misimović, the team's main assist and key pass provider, himself broke a longstanding Bundesliga record for assists by setting up 20 goals, the three players becoming known as "the magic triangle". Wolfsburg ended the season as Bundesliga champions for the first time in the club's history; they finished two points clear of Bayern Munich, the key match being the meeting between them on the 26th matchday which finished 5–1, Džeko and Grafite scoring two goals each in an impressive performance (the latter added his second and the team's fifth with a memorable dribble and backheel). At that point Wolfsburg, in third at the start of the day, gained the lead in the table for the first time and retained the position for the rest of the season to take the title.

In the DFB-Pokal, Džeko scored six goals in two matches, and in the UEFA Cup, four goals and two assists in eight matches. These performances resulted in him being given the Bundesliga Players' Footballer of the Year award. Despite attracting interest from A.C. Milan Džeko decided to stay, renewing his contract until June 2013.

He scored his first UEFA Champions League goal on 30 September 2009 against Manchester United in a 2–1 defeat at Old Trafford. He was one of 30 players nominated for the 2009 Ballon d'Or. He was the Bundesliga top scorer in the 2009–10 season with 22 goals.

On 28 August 2010, Džeko became the top league scorer in Wolfsburg's history with 59 goals in 96 appearances, surpassing Diego Klimowicz who scored 57 in 149 games. At the winter break stage of the 2010–11 Bundesliga season, Džeko had scored 10 goals in 17 matches.

=== Manchester City ===
After heavy speculation, Roberto Mancini, manager of Manchester City, confirmed on 3 January 2011 that a fee of £27 million (€32 million) had been agreed with Wolfsburg for Džeko, which was City's second highest transfer figure, after Robinho's £32.5 million (€42.5 million) move from Real Madrid in 2008. The transfer fee was the sixth highest in the Premier League history at the time. Also, the sum broke the Bundesliga record departure transfer fee, Bosnian record transfer fee, as well as that of any player from former Yugoslavia at the time. The previous ex-Yugoslav record stood for more than a decade – the transfer fee paid by Real Madrid to Fenerbahçe for Elvir Baljić in 1999 (€26 million). In August 2014 he signed a new four-year deal with the club, taking his contract up to 2018.

==== 2010–11 season ====
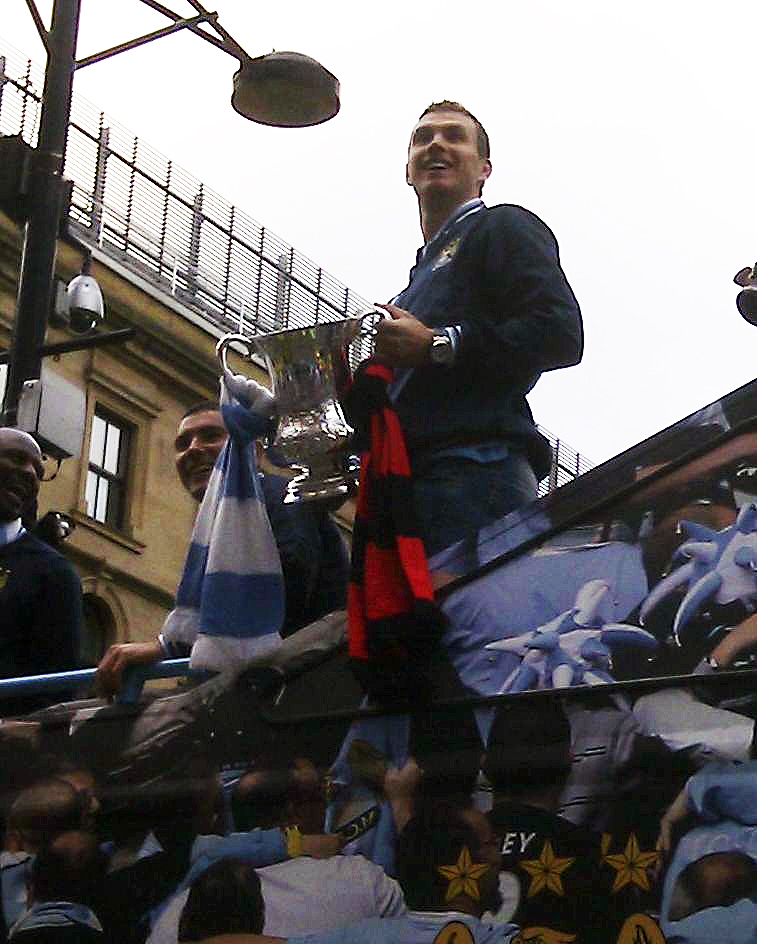
Džeko celebrates winning the FA Cup with Manchester City

Following his medical examination in London, he travelled to Manchester on 5 January, and on 7 January, Džeko was confirmed as a Manchester City player, joining the club on a four-and-a-half-year deal.

He made his debut for the club in a 4–3 win over Wolverhampton Wanderers on 15 January in which he set up Yaya Touré for the third goal of the match. Džeko marked his FA Cup debut on 30 January 2011 with the equalising goal in Manchester City's fourth round match against Notts County which ended in a 1–1 draw. In the replay on 20 February, Džeko again scored, helping Manchester City progress to the next round with a 5–0. Džeko scored twice against Aris Thessaloniki within four and a half minutes at the Etihad Stadium in the second leg of the last 32 of the UEFA Europa League on 24 February 2011.

On 25 April 2011, Džeko scored his first Premier League goal with a right footed finish against Blackburn Rovers at Ewood Park. This was the only goal of the game in a 1–0 win for Manchester City

His last goal was against Bolton Wanderers on the final day of the season and guaranteed City third place in the Premier League over Arsenal and automatic qualification into the group stage of the 2011–12 UEFA Champions League.

On 14 May 2011, Džeko was an unused substitute in Manchester City's 1–0 win over Stoke City the 2011 FA Cup final, winning his first trophy with the club.

==== 2011–12 season ====
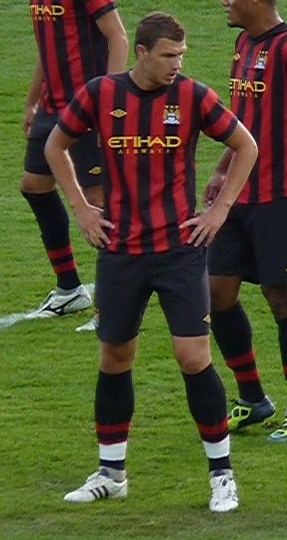
Džeko playing for City in 2011

Džeko started his second season with City by scoring the team's second goal in a 2–3 defeat against Manchester United in the FA Community Shield. In his third Premier League game of this season, Džeko scored four goals against Tottenham. In this game, Džeko broke another record by becoming the first Manchester City player to score four goals in one Premier League match. His tally of six league goals in three games won him the Premier League Player of the Month award for August.

Further on, he grabbed some important goals such as a header against Wigan Athletic that sealed a 1–0 win for City and extended their lead over title rivals Manchester United to three points, and a goal that put Manchester City 2–0 up against Porto in the Europa League, as they won 6–1 on aggregate. He also scored a headed goal against Blackburn Rovers, which put Manchester City 3–0 up, and sealed the game, this subsequently maintained City's narrow two-point margin over Manchester United.

Bosnia and Herzegovina national manager Safet Sušić urged Džeko to leave City at the end of the season because of lack of first-team football towards the end of the season, with the likes of Juventus and Bayern Munich interested. On the final day of the season, Džeko scored a 92nd-minute equaliser before Sergio Agüero scored in the 94th minute to beat Queens Park Rangers 3–2 and secure the Premier League title, the club's first in 44 years. Following his goal that helped win the championship, his 19th goal and 40th appearance in all competitions, Džeko's agent denied reports that the striker would leave City saying it was all media speculation.

==== 2012–13 season ====
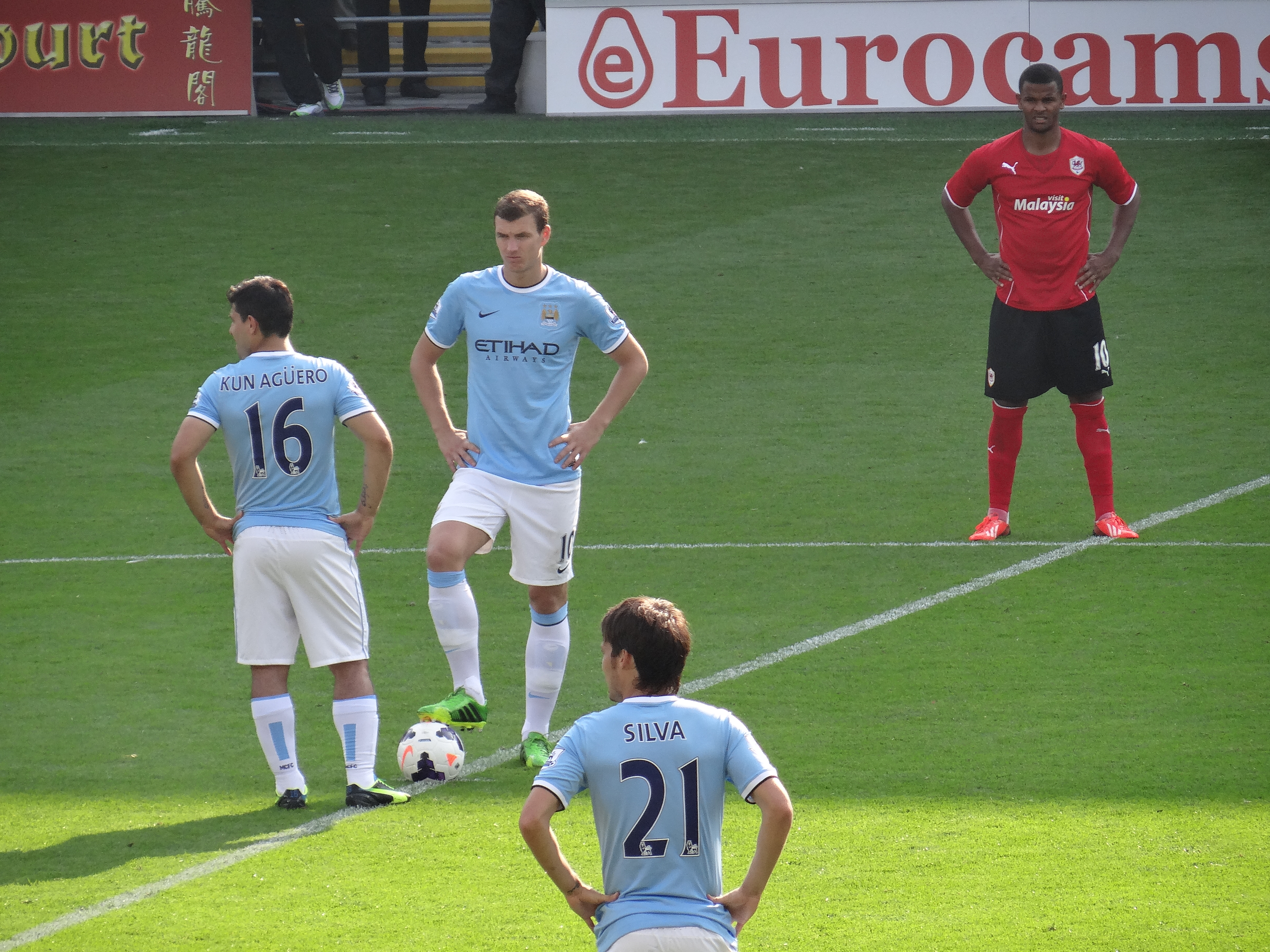
Sergio Agüero, Džeko and David Silva with Manchester City in 2013

Džeko began the new 2012–13 season with an equalising goal against Southampton in a 3–2 win. He scored another goal against Queens Park Rangers taking his tally to two goals in the opening three games. He then scored the first goal of City's Champions League campaign against Real Madrid at the Santiago Bernabéu. On 29 September, he scored an 87th-minute winner away at Fulham, one minute after appearing as a substitute. On 20 October, he came off the bench in the 79th minute to score a minute later. He scored a second goal two minutes into stoppage time to seal a comeback win for 10-man City against West Bromwich. On 11 November, Džeko scored another late winning goal as a substitute with a left-footed volley in the 88th minute against Tottenham Hotspur. On 29 December 2012, he scored two goals against Norwich City in a 4–3 victory.

He finished the season with 14 goals in the Premier League and 15 overall.

==== 2013–14 season ====
On the opening day of the 2013–14 Premier League season, Džeko was selected to start by a new manager Manuel Pellegrini against Newcastle United at the City of Manchester Stadium. He scored his first goal in a 3–2 defeat at Cardiff City. Džeko scored his 50th goal in England with an only goal of the game against Crystal Palace on 28 December 2013.

On 25 March 2014, Džeko scored twice in a 3–0 Manchester Derby win against Manchester United. His first goal came after just 43 seconds, making it the fastest away goal scored at Old Trafford in Premier League history. On 27 April, he scored City's first goal of a 2–0 defeat of Crystal Palace at Selhurst Park, closing the gap on league leaders Liverpool to three points with a game in hand.

He scored a brace in City's match at Everton on 3 May, helping City to a 3–2 win and lift the club to the top of the table with two matches left. His second goal of the game was City's 150th goal in all competitions. In City's penultimate game of the season against Aston Villa, Džeko scored two second-half goals as City won 4–0, ensuring that the club would be crowned champions with a draw against West Ham United at home on the final day, which City eventually won.

==== 2014–15 season ====
On 17 August 2014, Džeko assisted David Silva for Manchester City's first goal of the 2014–15 season in a 2–0 defeat of Newcastle United. On 20 August, Džeko signed a new four-year contract with the club, tying him to Manchester City until 2018.

On 24 September, Džeko scored his first two goals of the season as Manchester City beat Sheffield Wednesday 7–0 in the third round of the Football League Cup. On 27 September, he again scored twice in Manchester City's 4–2 win away to Hull City to record his first goals of the Premier League season.

On 21 February 2015, Džeko ended a run of 15 matches without a goal by scoring Manchester City's third goal in a 5–0 home victory against Newcastle United.

=== Roma ===
After months of speculation during the 2015 summer transfer market, Džeko officially signed for Serie A outfit Roma on 12 August 2015, on a €4 million loan with an €11 million option to buy that would become mandatory after certain performance related goals were met. These clauses were activated on 1 October 2015, making Džeko a permanent member of Roma.

==== 2015–16 season ====
He made his Serie A debut ten days after his move from Manchester City, playing the entirety of a 1–1 draw at Hellas Verona, and in his second appearance on 30 August, he scored the winning goal in the 79th minute to defeat reigning champions Juventus 2–1 at the Stadio Olimpico. On 21 February 2016, he scored his first brace for Roma, scoring the first and last goals in a 5–0 win over Palermo.

==== 2016–17 season ====
After a relatively disappointing first season with the club, in which Džeko scored only 8 Serie A and 10 goals in all competitions for Roma, he started the 2016–17 season with 12 goals in 15 games, 17 goals in 20 overall, thus equaling the start of the season that Gabriel Batistuta had, in which he won the league title with Roma. On 24 November 2016, he scored a hat-trick in the Europa League, in a 4–1 win over Viktoria Plzeň. On 16 February 2017, he also scored a hat-trick in the first leg of a Europa League match against Villarreal, which Roma won 4–0. On 12 March 2017, he became the fourth Roma player to reach 30 goals in all competitions in a season.

On 1 April 2017, Džeko became the first Roma player ever to reach 33 goals in a season in all competitions, surpassing the previous record of 32 goals jointly held by Rodolfo Volk and Francesco Totti. He ended the season with a tally of 39 goals in all competitions of which his 29 goals in Serie A made him the Capocannoniere for that season becoming the first Bosnian player to do so.

==== 2017–18 season ====
Džeko started his third season at the Roman club with six goals in first five league games. He scored his first goal of the season against Inter Milan on 26 August 2017, which Roma lost 1–3. In the next two games, he scored two braces, against Verona and Benevento. He continued his goalscoring form by opening the score against A.C. Milan on 1 October, in a 2–0 win away at San Siro. On 9 October, Džeko was one of 30 players to be nominated for the 2017 Ballon d'Or prize by French newspaper France Football. Džeko then scored a brace against Chelsea at Stamford Bridge on 19 October. The game ended in a 3–3 draw. His next big game of the season came against Napoli, in which he scored a brace and helped his team to a 4–2 victory. Džeko also helped Roma reach UEFA Champions League quarter-finals by scoring the winning goal against Shakhtar Donetsk. Džeko was instrumental in Roma's qualification to UEFA Champions League semi-finals, their first in over 30 years. He scored in both quarter-final legs against Barcelona, which Roma won on away goals. In the semi-finals, Džeko scored in both legs, but it wasn't enough, as Roma were eventually eliminated by Liverpool 6–7 on aggregate. Džeko ended the season with 24 goals, 16 of which he scored in Serie A, making him club's best goalscorer in the league and joint sixth overall. He also added 8 goals in Champions League, which meant he ended as competition's fifth best goalscorer.

==== 2018–19 season ====
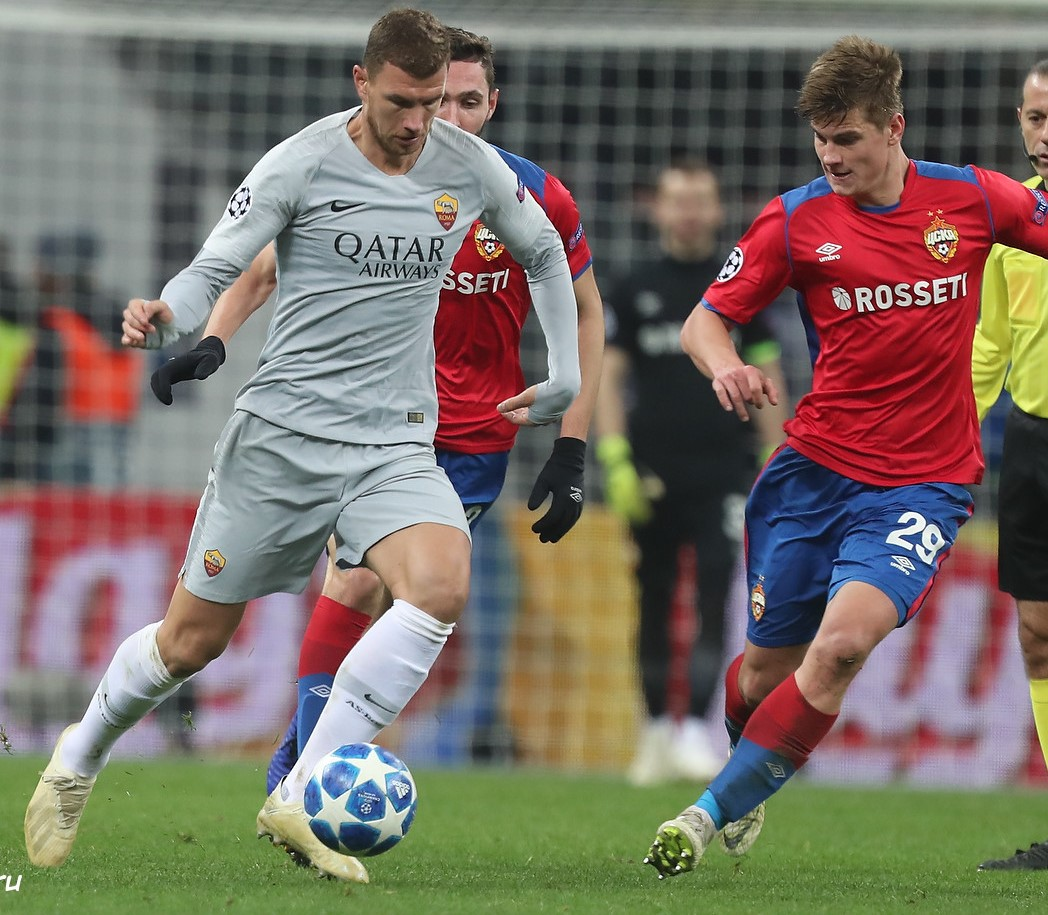
Džeko playing for Roma against CSKA Moscow in November 2018

Džeko started his fourth season with Roma by scoring a winning goal away at Torino on 19 August. Džeko scored his first UEFA Champions League hat-trick on 2 October when he again put three past Viktoria Plzeň, in the 2018–19 UEFA Champions League group stage. He became the first Bosnian to score a hat-trick in the top European club competition.

On 13 April 2019, Džeko scored his 8th goal in the league against Udinese in the 68th minute, giving Roma a win. He scored his 9th league goal for Roma on 12 May 2019, in a 2–0 home win against league champions Juventus in the 90+3rd minute.

==== 2019–20 season ====
During pre-season of the 2019–20 season, Džeko extended his contract with Roma until June 2022 on 16 August 2019. He scored his first official goal for the club in the new season on 25 August 2019, in a 3–3 home league draw against Genoa. On 22 September 2019, Džeko scored a 93rd-minute goal in Roma's 1–2 away league win over Bologna.

In a game against Cagliari on 6 October 2019, Džeko fractured his zygomatic bone (cheekbone), needing to go get surgery and afterwards wear a protective mask in some of his first games after the recovery. He scored his 5th goal in the season for Roma in the club's 2–1 home league win against Milan on 27 October 2019. With a goal in a UEFA Europa League game against Wolfsberg on 12 December 2019, which Roma drew 2–2, Džeko helped his team qualify for the last 16 of the 2019–20 UEFA Europa League season.

He made his 200th appearance for the club in Roma's 3–1 home league win against S.P.A.L. on 15 December 2019.

=== Inter Milan ===
==== 2021–22 season ====
On 14 August 2021, Džeko joined Serie A club Inter Milan, but without being officially introduced he played a friendly match against Ukrainian club Dynamo Kyiv after being named in the starting line-up, and scored his side's second goal during a 3–0 home win. Later that day, Inter announced that he had signed a two-year deal. He scored his first goal for the club in a 4–0 win against Genoa.

In his first season with the club, he scored 13 goals in 36 Serie A matches, and totalled 17 goals and 10 assists across all competitions in 49 matches.

==== 2022–23 season ====
On 4 January 2023, Džeko scored the only goal of the match against championship leaders Napoli, giving them their first league defeat for the 2022–23 season. Fourteen days later, he scored in the 3–0 win over Milan in the 2022 Supercoppa Italiana and was named Man of the Match; with this goal he became the oldest goalscorer (36 years and 307 days) of the competition, breaking the previous record set by Cristiano Ronaldo (35 years and 350 days) in 2020.

On 10 May 2023, Džeko scored a volley in a 2–0 win over Milan in the Champions League semifinals, and in doing so at the age of 37 years and 54 days, he became the second oldest player to score in the semifinals of the UCL, after Ryan Giggs (37 years and 148 days in April 2011). On 3 June 2023, Džeko played his 100th Inter match in all competitions in a 1–0 away win over Torino in the last matchday of Serie A. On 10 June, he was in the starting eleven in Inter's UEFA Champions League final against his former side Manchester City. Džeko was substituted for Romelu Lukaku in the 57th minute. City eventually beat Inter 1–0 at the Atatürk Olympic Stadium in Istanbul to win the Champions League.

Later that month, it was confirmed that Džeko would leave the club after two seasons, during which he won four trophies, scored 31 goals and assisted 15 more in all competitions.

=== Fenerbahçe ===
==== 2023–24 season ====
On 22 June 2023, Süper Lig side Fenerbahçe announced that Džeko arrived in Istanbul to complete his transfer to Turkey. He signed a two-year contract on the same day. A month later, on 26 July, he made his debut for the club as the captain, in which he scored a goal and provided two assists in their 5–0 win over Zimbru Chișinău in the Europa Conference League second qualifying round, becoming at 37 years Fenerbahçe oldest player and goalscorer in European competitions.

On 13 August, he made his Süper Lig debut against Gaziantep at the Şükrü Saracoğlu Stadium, scoring both goals in a 2–1 win for Fenerbahce. On 29 October, he scored his first Süper Lig hat-trick in a 5–0 away win against Pendikspor. He concluded his debut season as Fenerbahçe's top scorer with 21 goals, ranking second in the league, just behind Mauro Icardi.

==== 2024–25 season ====
In his second season with the club, he made a very strong start with new coach José Mourinho. On 23 July 2024, he made his season debut against Lugano in an UEFA Europa League second qualifying round away game, scoring a hat-trick in a 4–3 win for Fenerbahçe.

=== Fiorentina ===
On 19 June 2025, Džeko returned to Serie A, joining Fiorentina on a one-year deal with an option to extend for a second season. On 23 October 2025, he scored Fiorentina's second goal in a 3–0 win at Rapid Wien, aged 39 years and 220 days, becoming the oldest scorer in UEFA Conference League history.

=== Schalke 04 ===
On 22 January 2026, German 2. Bundesliga side Schalke 04 confirmed that they signed Džeko until the end of the season. Three days later, he made his debut as a substitute, scoring a goal in a 2–2 draw with Kaiserslautern, becoming the oldest player to score in the 2. Bundesliga, aged 39 years and 314 days, breaking the previous record of Helmut Haller. On 3 August 2026, he extended his contract by another year to remain at Schalke, which had been promoted to the Bundesliga.

== International career ==
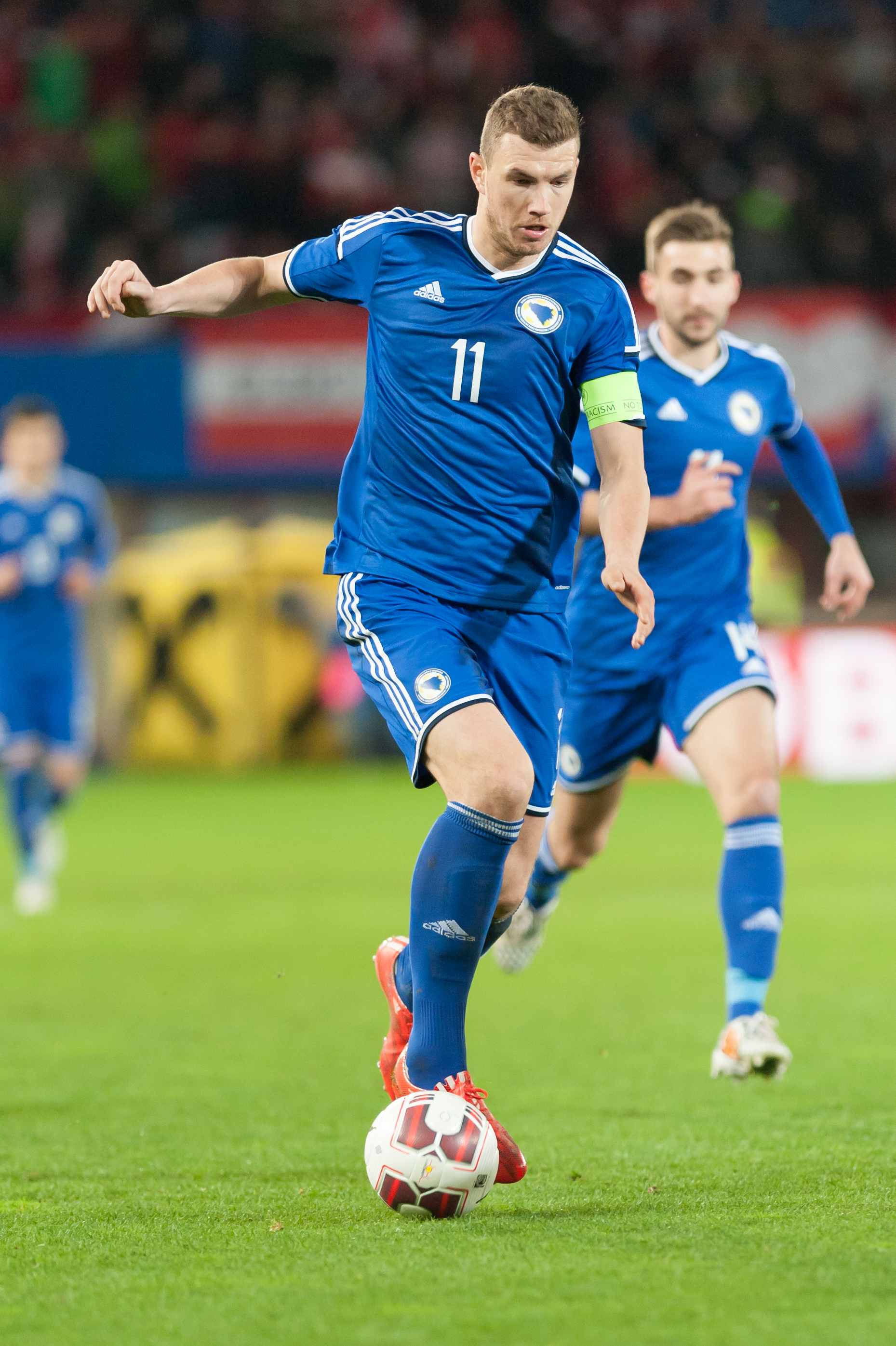
Džeko playing for Bosnia and Herzegovina in 2015

Džeko's first appearance for his home country came with the Bosnia and Herzegovina national under-19 football team. He was also part of the under-21 team who played in the play-offs for UEFA European Under-21 Championship hosted by the Netherlands in 2007. Bosnia's first challenges in this competition were Armenia under-21 and Norway under-21. They beat Armenia 3–2 and drew with Norway 1–1, qualifying for the playoff against the Czech Republic under-21. In the first leg, Bosnia lost 2–1; in the second, the game ended in a 1–1 draw. Džeko scored one goal in the tournament.

He made his senior debut against Turkey on 2 June 2007. It was a memorable debut for the player, scoring a volleyed goal during the first half stoppage time. The goal levelled the score at 2–2 and Bosnia went on to win 3–2.

On 28 March 2009, Bosnian sports commentator, Marjan Mijajlović, named Džeko "the Bosnian Diamond" during a game versus Belgium in Genk in which he scored a remarkable goal.

He scored nine goals in 2010 FIFA World Cup qualifying and finished as the second highest goalscorer in 2010 FIFA World Cup qualification, tied with England's Wayne Rooney, behind Greek striker Theofanis Gekas' 10 goals.

On 8 September 2012, in an 8–1 win over Liechtenstein, Džeko scored his first hat-trick for the national team and at the same time became the leading goal scorer in the history of the Bosnia and Herzegovina national team with 24 goals. The record was previously held by Elvir Bolić who scored 22 goals.

Džeko ended the 2014 FIFA World Cup qualification campaign as second-top scorer with ten goals as Bosnia and Herzegovina qualified for the first major tournament in its history.

In June 2014, Džeko was named in Bosnian squad for the 2014 FIFA World Cup. He debuted in the team's opening group match, a narrow defeat to Argentina at the Maracanã Stadium. On 25 June with the team already eliminated, in the final group match against Iran, Džeko scored the opening goal to help Bosnia and Herzegovina to their first ever FIFA World Cup win.

In August, following the retirement of Emir Spahić from the international team, manager Safet Sušić named Džeko the new captain.

On 28 March 2015, Džeko netted his second international hat-trick, scoring all of the goals in a 3–0 away win over Andorra in UEFA Euro 2016 qualifying, their first win in five games of the qualification campaign.

On 13 November 2016, Džeko had an altercation in a 2018 FIFA World Cup qualifier against Greece with Greek player Kyriakos Papadopoulos, in which he pulled down Sokratis Papastathopoulos' shorts while trying to obtain the ball. The subsequent fight between the two teams saw both Džeko and Papadopoulos sent off. It was his first red card in the national jersey.

On 28 March 2017, Džeko became the first Bosnian player to score 50 international goals. On 23 March 2019, he made his 100th appearance for Bosnia in a 2–1 win over Armenia in the UEFA Euro 2020 qualifiers.

On 14 June 2022, by playing against Finland in a 2022–23 UEFA Nations League B game, Džeko became his country's oldest player at 36 years and 2 months, beating Samir Muratović's record. On 7 September 2024, by scoring a goal against the Netherlands in a 2024–25 UEFA Nations League A game, he became Bosnia and Herzegovina's oldest goalscorer at 38 years and 5 months, surpassing Emir Spahić's record.

On 7 June 2025, Džeko scored the only goal in a 1–0 win over San Marino in the 2026 World Cup qualification, becoming at 39 years, 2 months and 21 days UEFA's oldest goalscorer in a World Cup qualification game, beating the record of Andorran Marc Pujol. Nine days after his 40th birthday, on 26 March 2026, he equalised late into a game against Wales in the World Cup qualification play-off semi-finals, which Bosnia and Herzegovina ultimately won on penalties and advanced to the final against Italy. In doing so, Džeko scored for the country for the 20th consecutive year.

Džeko was included in the 26-man squad for the 2026 FIFA World Cup, marking his second appearance at the tournament. He did not feature in the opening match against Canada, but returned to the starting lineup for the second match against Switzerland.

On 3 September 2026, Džeko announced that Bosnia and Herzegovina's UEFA Nations League match against Sweden on 2 October would be his final appearance for the national team. He was subbed off in the 62nd minute and given a guard of honour by players from both sides.

== Style of play ==
Džeko is renowned for his physical presence, strength and aerial ability. Considered by pundits and managers to be one of the best strikers in Europe at his peak, although he is mainly known for his goalscoring abilities, he is also a generous player, who has a penchant for providing a good number of assists in addition to scoring many goals. He is also known for shooting the ball with both feet equally well. Wherever he played, he posted impressive goalscoring records, playing mainly as a striker. His former Roma manager Luciano Spalletti once described him as the "perfect prototype" of a striker, noting that he is "strong, tall, fast for his height, combative, aggressive and has good technique." In his youth, he also played as a midfielder, and as a winger.

During his time with Manchester City, he was considered a "super-sub", as he scored many important goals coming off the bench, a label which he himself rejected on several occasions. In retrospective, Džeko is now often described, by his peers and experts alike, as one of the most underrated players in recent history, whose career is too often overlooked in discussions and considerations by football writers and pundits.

== Personal life ==
Džeko was born in Sarajevo, SR Bosnia and Herzegovina, at that time part of SFR Yugoslavia, to Midhat and Belma Džeko. He stated that his family was always supportive throughout his career, especially his father, who took him to training sessions while he was at Željezničar. His father also played professionally in Bosnia and Herzegovina. Džeko is considered a local superstar in Sarajevo.

Džeko was six years old when the Siege of Sarajevo began, lasting for nearly four years. His family home was destroyed, and 15 family members had to live in his grandparents' apartment that measured 35 square metres. He continued to play outside in the neighbourhood of Otoka; on a rare occasion that his mother forbade him to play outside, a missile killed several children on the local football pitch.

Džeko is multilingual, speaking five languages fluently: Bosnian, Czech, German, English and Italian. He is a Muslim, and has dual citizenship of Bosnia and Herzegovina and Croatia. Džeko stated that AC Milan has always been his favourite club, although he played two seasons for city rivals Inter Milan. Džeko said in 2011 that Andriy Shevchenko was his favourite player. Džeko is a first cousin of former fellow national team player and captain Emir Spahić.

In November 2009, Džeko became Bosnia's first UNICEF ambassador. He has since visited schools and children in his home country affected by the Bosnian War. On 6 July 2012, Džeko was accepted to the University of Sarajevo to study sport and physical education. On 10 September 2018, he graduated with a bachelor's degree.

Džeko has been in a relationship with model and actress, Amra Silajdžić since 2011, marrying her in 2014. They have three daughters and a son.

== Career statistics ==
=== Club ===
As of match played 8 November 2026

Appearances and goals by club, season and competition
Club	Season	League			National cup (Note: Includes Bosnian Cup, Czech Cup, DFB-Pokal, FA Cup, Coppa Italia, Turkish Cup)		League cup (Note: Includes Football League Cup)		Europe		Other		Total	
Club	Season	Division	Apps	Goals	Apps	Goals	Apps	Goals	Apps	Goals	Apps	Goals	Apps	Goals
Željezničar	2003–04	Bosnian Premier League	15	2	? (Note: The symbol '?' indicates that the number is unknown; could be 0 or more.)	?	—		1 (Note: Appearance(s) in UEFA Cup)	0	—		16+	2+
Željezničar	2004–05	Bosnian Premier League	20	1	?	?	—		0	0	—		20+	1+
Željezničar	Total		35	3	?	?	0	0	1	0	0	0	36+	3+
Teplice	2005–06	Czech First League	13	3	—		—		—		—		13	3
Teplice	2006–07	Czech First League	30	13	2	0	—		2 (Note: Appearances in UEFA Intertoto Cup)	0	—		34	13
Teplice	Total		43	16	2	0	0	0	2	0	0	0	47	16
Ústí nad Labem (loan)	2005–06	Czech National League	15	6	2+ (Note: Džeko played in at least two matches for Ústí nad Labem in the 2005–06 Czech Cup from the four matches the club played there, in which he scored one goal.)	1+	—		—		—		17+	7+
VfL Wolfsburg	2007–08	Bundesliga	28	8	5	1	—		—		—		33	9
VfL Wolfsburg	2008–09	Bundesliga	32	26	2	6	—		8	4	—		42	36
VfL Wolfsburg	2009–10	Bundesliga	34	22	2	2	—		12 (Note: Six appearances and four goals in UEFA Champions League, six appearances and one goal in UEFA Europa League)	5	—		48	29
VfL Wolfsburg	2010–11	Bundesliga	17	10	2	1	—		—		—		19	11
VfL Wolfsburg	Total		111	66	11	10	0	0	20	9	0	0	142	85
Manchester City	2010–11	Premier League	15	2	2	2	—		4 (Note: Appearances in UEFA Europa League)	2	—		21	6
Manchester City	2011–12	Premier League	30	14	0	0	4	3	8 (Note: Five appearances in UEFA Champions League, three appearances and one goal in UEFA Europa League)	1	1 (Note: Appearance in FA Community Shield)	1	43	19
Manchester City	2012–13	Premier League	32	14	5	0	1	0	6 (Note: Appearances in UEFA Champions League)	1	1	0	45	15
Manchester City	2013–14	Premier League	31	16	5	2	5	6	7	2	—		48	26
Manchester City	2014–15	Premier League	22	4	1	0	2	2	6	0	1	0	32	6
Manchester City	Total		130	50	13	4	12	11	31	6	3	1	189	72
Roma (loan)	2015–16	Serie A	31	8	1	0	—		7	2	—		39	10
Roma	2016–17	Serie A	37	29	4	2	—		10 (Note: Two appearances in UEFA Champions League, eight appearances and eight goals in UEFA Europa League)	8	—		51	39
Roma	2017–18	Serie A	36	16	1	0	—		12	8	—		49	24
Roma	2018–19	Serie A	33	9	1	0	—		6	5	—		40	14
Roma	2019–20	Serie A	35	16	0	0	—		8	3	—		43	19
Roma	2020–21	Serie A	27	7	1	0	—		10	6	—		38	13
Roma	Total		199	85	8	2	0	0	53	32	0	0	260	119
Inter Milan	2021–22	Serie A	36	13	5	1	—		7	3	1 (Note: Appearance in Supercoppa Italiana)	0	49	17
Inter Milan	2022–23	Serie A	33	9	5	0	—		13	4	1	1	52	14
Inter Milan	Total		69	22	10	1	0	0	20	7	2	1	101	31
Fenerbahçe	2023–24	Süper Lig	36	21	0	0	—		10 (Note: Appearances in UEFA (Europa) Conference League)	4	0	0	46	25
Fenerbahçe	2024–25	Süper Lig	35	14	2	0	—		16 (Note: Four appearances and four goals in UEFA Champions League, twelve appearances and three goals in UEFA Europa League)	7	—		53	21
Fenerbahçe	Total		71	35	2	0	0	0	26	11	0	0	99	46
Fiorentina	2025–26	Serie A	11	0	—		—		7	2	—		18	2
Schalke 04	2025–26	2. Bundesliga	11	6	—		—		—		—		11	6
Schalke 04	2026–27	Bundesliga	7	0	2	2	—		—		—		9	2
Schalke 04	Total		18	6	2	2	0	0	0	0	0	0	20	8
Career total			702	289	50	20	12	11	160	67	5	2	929	389

=== International ===
Appearances and goals by national team and year
National team	Year	Apps	Goals
Bosnia and Herzegovina	2007	7	1
Bosnia and Herzegovina	2008	6	5
Bosnia and Herzegovina	2009	10	8
Bosnia and Herzegovina	2010	8	3
Bosnia and Herzegovina	2011	10	3
Bosnia and Herzegovina	2012	9	6
Bosnia and Herzegovina	2013	9	7
Bosnia and Herzegovina	2014	10 (Note: Three appearances and one goal in 2014 FIFA World Cup)	5
Bosnia and Herzegovina	2015	7	7
Bosnia and Herzegovina	2016	7	4
Bosnia and Herzegovina	2017	6	3
Bosnia and Herzegovina	2018	10	3
Bosnia and Herzegovina	2019	8	3
Bosnia and Herzegovina	2020	5	1
Bosnia and Herzegovina	2021	6	1
Bosnia and Herzegovina	2022	8	4
Bosnia and Herzegovina	2023	7	1
Bosnia and Herzegovina	2024	6	2
Bosnia and Herzegovina	2025	7	5
Bosnia and Herzegovina	2026	6 (Note: Three appearances in 2026 FIFA World Cup)	1
Total		152	73

== Honours ==
VfL Wolfsburg

- Bundesliga: 2008–09

Manchester City

- Premier League: 2011–12, 2013–14
- FA Cup: 2010–11; runner-up: 2012–13
- Football League Cup: 2013–14
- FA Community Shield: 2012

Inter Milan

- Coppa Italia: 2021–22, 2022–23
- Supercoppa Italiana: 2021, 2022
- UEFA Champions League runner-up: 2022–23

Schalke 04

- 2. Bundesliga: 2025–26

Individual

- Ballon d'Or nominee: 2009 (13th), 2017 (28th)
- Bosnian Sportsman of the Year: 2009, 2018
- Bosnian Footballer of the Year: 2009, 2010, 2011
- DFB-Pokal top scorer: 2008–09
- Bundesliga Players' Player of the Year: 2008–09
- kicker Bundesliga Team of the Season: 2008–09, 2009–10
- Bundesliga top scorer (Torschützenkönig): 2009–10
- Premier League Player of the Month: August 2011
- Castrol Performance Index EDGE Performance of the Month: August 2011
- Serie A top scorer: 2016–17
- UEFA Champions League Squad of the Season: 2017–18
- UEFA Europa League top scorer: 2016–17
- UEFA Europa League Squad of the Season: 2020–21
- Roma Supporters' Player of the Season: 2017–18

== See also ==
- List of men's footballers with 1,000 or more official appearances
- List of top international men's football goalscorers by country
- List of men's footballers with 100 or more international caps
- List of men's footballers with 50 or more international goals
