= Mustafa Mijajlović =

Bosnian journalist and sportscaster (born 1972)

- Born: Marjan Mijajlović; 17 March 1972 (age 54); Tuzla, SR Bosnia and Herzegovina, SFR Yugoslavia
- Other name: Maki
- Occupations: Journalist; Sportscaster
- Partner(s): Martina Banovac (2023–present; engaged)
- Career
- Network: Sport Klub; Hayat; Face TV

Mustafa "Maki" Mijajlović (Cyrillic: Мустафа Мијајловић; born Marjan Mijajlović, 17 March 1972) is a Bosnian journalist and sportscaster currently working for Face TV. He is considered by many to be one of the greatest sportscasters in the former Yugoslavia.

== Career ==
Mijajlović's career began in the Serbian sports television station Sport Klub. He became popular in Serbia and in Bosnia and Herzegovina for his positive comments on Bosnian players in the German Bundesliga.

After the 2007–08 Bundesliga season was over, Mijajlović took a job with Bosnian NTV Hayat to commentate Bosnia and Herzegovina national football team matches. He commentated only one game between Bosnia and Herzegovina and Belgium, which Bosnia won 4–2. Mijajlović gained notability for his call of the first Bosnian goal in which he referred to the player Edin Džeko as a 'Diamond' and gave the team the nickname "Dragons". However, several weeks after the game, Mijajlović was fired from Hayat, due to disagreements with the station's sports redaction.

His style of commentating is unique to the area of former Yugoslavia, and it is similar to Brazilian and Turkish commentators. Mijajlović claims that this is because "...when I was little, my brother and I used to watch Galatasaray in the Turkish League, whose commentators inspired me."

Mijajlović currently works for Face TV. He also has a YouTube channel called Marjan Mijajlović, created in July 2020, where he publishes videos and podcasts which deal primarily with football, but encompass other sports as well.

== Personal life ==
Mijajlović was born Marjan Mijajlović in Tuzla on 17 March 1972, and moved to Belgrade in 1992. He converted to Islam and changed his name to Mustafa in 2016.

On 30 November 2023, Mijajlović and his partner Martina Banovac from Split got engaged in Sarajevo.
