= Bosnia and Herzegovina national football team =

Men's national association football team representing Bosnia and Herzegovina

Bosnia and Herzegovina
- Nickname(s): Zmajevi (The Dragons); Zlatni Ljiljani (Golden Lilies)
- Association: Nogometni/Fudbalski Savez Bosne i Hercegovine (N/FSBiH)
- Confederation: UEFA (Europe)
- Head coach: Sergej Barbarez
- Captain: Sead Kolašinac
- Most caps: Edin Džeko (152)
- Top scorer: Edin Džeko (73)
- Home stadium: Bilino Polje
- FIFA code: BIH
First colours	Second colours

FIFA ranking
- Current: 57 (18 November 2026)
- Highest: 13 (August 2013)
- Lowest: 173 (September 1996)

First international
- Albania 2–0 Bosnia and Herzegovina (Tirana, Albania; 30 November 1995)

Biggest win
- Bosnia and Herzegovina 7–0 Estonia (Zenica, Bosnia and Herzegovina; 10 September 2008); Liechtenstein 1–8 Bosnia and Herzegovina (Vaduz, Liechtenstein; 7 September 2012)

Biggest defeat
- Germany 7–0 Bosnia and Herzegovina (Freiburg im Breisgau, Germany; 16 November 2024)

World Cup
- Appearances: 2 (first in 2014)
- Best result: Round of 32 (2026)
- Website: nfsbih.ba

The Bosnia and Herzegovina national football team (Note: Bosnian: Fudbalska reprezentacija Bosne i Hercegovine; Croatian: Nogometna reprezentacija Bosne i Hercegovine; Serbian: Фудбалска репрезентација Босне и Херцеговине) represents Bosnia and Herzegovina in men's international football competitions. It is governed by the Football Association of Bosnia and Herzegovina following country's independence from Socialist Federal Republic of Yugoslavia in 1992.

The team played its first official international match on 30th November 1995 against Albania in Tirana, coming just nine days after the signing of the General Framework Agreement for Peace in Bosnia and Herzegovina, in order to meet criteria for 1998 FIFA World Cup qualifing. The qualifing draw was made on 12 December 1995, and was based on the November 1995 FIFA World Rankings.

Bosnia and Herzegovina has reached two major tournaments in its history to date; the 2014 FIFA World Cup, where they were eliminated in the group stage, and most recently in the 2026 FIFA World Cup, where the team advanced to the knockout stage. Bosnia and Herzegovina is currently the only national team in the world to have qualified twice for the World Cup while failing to ever qualify for its continental championship, joining the now defunct East Germany as one of only two national teams in the world to have appeared in a World Cup without ever competing in their continental championship.

The team's highest FIFA World Ranking was 13th, which they achieved in August 2013.

== History ==
From the creation of Yugoslavia in 1918 to the breakup of Yugoslavia in 1992, players from the modern-day Bosnia and Herzegovina lined up for Yugoslavia, but following their independence and devastating Bosnian War, a new football nation arose from the ashes.

Following acceptance into FIFA, Bosnia and Herzegovina entered 1998 FIFA World Cup qualifiers to compete for a place in a major competition. Bosnia and Herzegovina finished fourth in a group that included Greece, Denmark (reached Quarter-finals), Croatia (finishing third) and Slovenia. During 2002 FIFA World Cup qualification, Bosnia and Herzegovina also finished in fourth in a group with Spain (eventual tournament Quarter-finalist).

This early period was followed by Bosnia and Herzegovina coming very close to qualifying directly for their first major competition, UEFA Euro 2004, narrowly missing out by a single goal against Denmark (needing a victory to top the group). Bosnia and Herzegovina failed to make the grade in the 2006 FIFA World Cup qualifiers, despite being unbeaten at home (drawing twice with Spain). The national team then experienced double heartbreak, bowing out twice in the playoffs to Portugal. First 2–0 on aggregate in the 2010 FIFA World Cup play-offs decider (having been grouped with UEFA Euro 2008 champion and eventual 2010 FIFA World Cup winners Spain during qualifying phase) and then 6–2 on aggregate in the UEFA Euro 2012 play-offs decider after finishing second by a point to France.

=== 2014 FIFA World Cup ===
Bosnia and Herzegovina qualified for the 2014 FIFA World Cup, their first major tournament, by beating Lithuania in October 2013 during UEFA qualifying that also included Greece and Slovakia. At the tournament, Bosnia and Herzegovina finished third in a group which included Argentina and won their first match 3–1 over Iran. Nigeria (2013 Africa Cup of Nations champion) pipped them for second place in the group with a 1–0 win marred with controversy following an incorrectly-disallowed goal by Edin Džeko in the first half.

Pos	Team	Pld	W	D	L	GF	GA	GD	Pts	Qualification
1	Argentina	3	3	0	0	6	3	+3	9	Advance to knockout stage
2	Nigeria	3	1	1	1	3	3	0	4	Advance to knockout stage
3	Bosnia and Herzegovina	3	1	0	2	4	4	0	3	
4	Iran	3	0	1	2	1	4	−3	1	

Source: FIFA
Rules for classification: Tie-breaking criteria

In the UEFA Euro 2016 qualifiers, Bosnia and Herzegovina finished third behind Belgium and Wales. After a bad start to the qualifiers with a surprise 2–1 defeat at home against Cyprus and managing just two points in four games, Safet Sušić was dismissed and replaced by Mehmed Baždarević. With five wins in their remaining six matches, including victories over Wales and Israel along with three clean sheets Bosnia and Herzegovina ultimately failed to qualify after a two legged playoff encounter with the Republic of Ireland. Bosnia and Herzegovina failed to make back-to-back FIFA World Cups after failing to qualify to the 2018 FIFA World Cup.

Bosnia and Herzegovina won their UEFA Nations League group and guaranteed a playoffs berth for UEFA Euro 2020 qualifying. Still, they finished fourth in their UEFA Euro 2020 qualifying group with the manager Robert Prosinečki, missing out on direct qualification and entered the playoffs, and with new manager Dušan Bajević, they ultimately missed out on yet another Euro after losing to Northern Ireland on penalties. They finished bottom of Group 1 in the 2020–21 UEFA Nations League A, thus relegating them to the 2022–23 UEFA Nations League B.

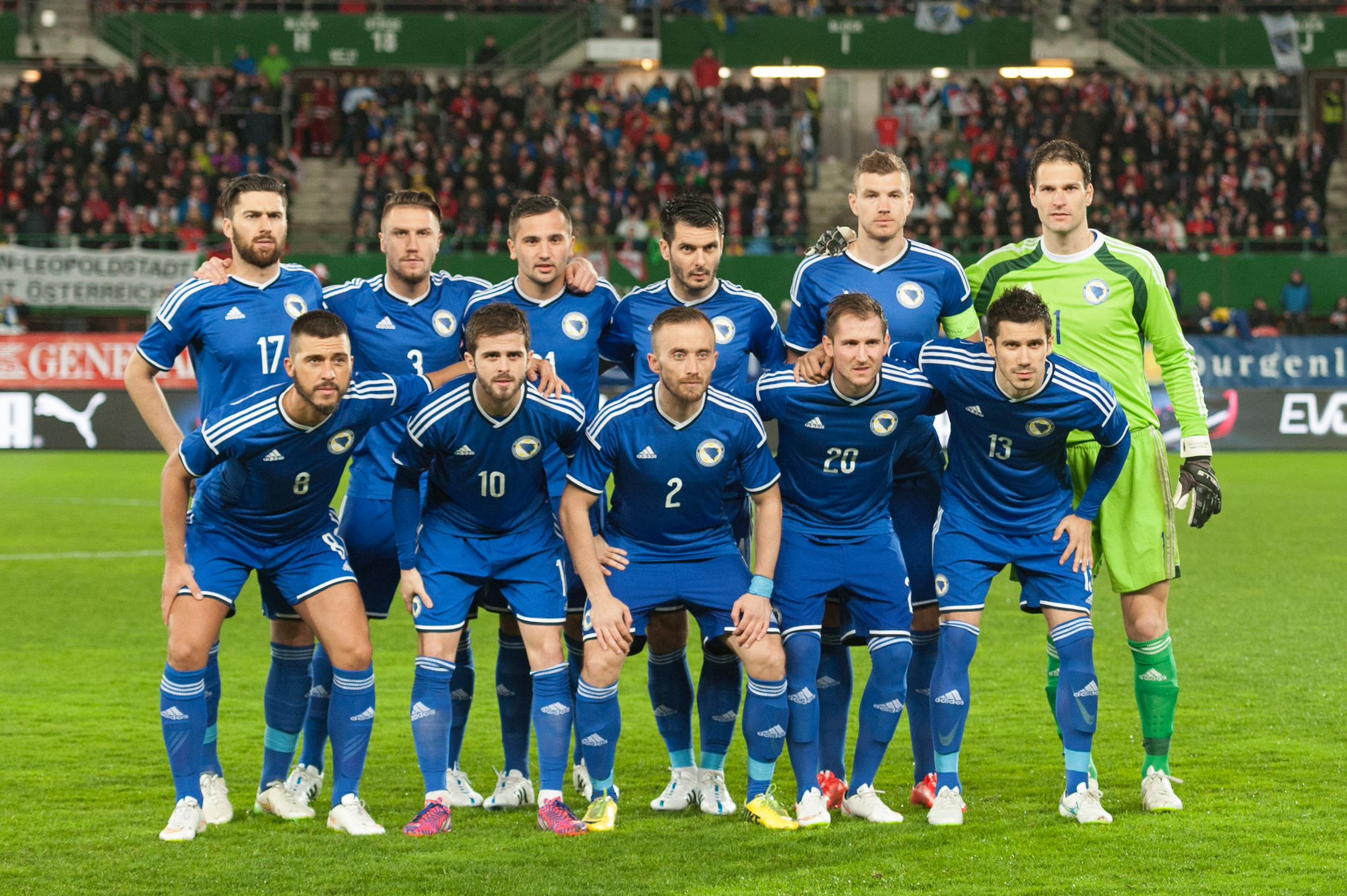
Bosnia and Herzegovina's squad in an international friendly against Austria in 2015

Following several years of disappointment, Bulgarian Ivaylo Petev was named as Bosnia and Herzegovina's new manager, marking the first time a Bosnia and Herzegovina manager was not from the former Yugoslavia. In their first campaign under Petev, Bosnia and Herzegovina were drawn into a group with 2018 FIFA World Cup champions France and kept their chances of qualification alive until the final two matches; ultimately failing to qualify for the 2022 FIFA World Cup. He also led the team to winning Group 3 of the 2022–23 UEFA Nations League B, thus earning promotion back to 2024–25 UEFA Nations League A and guaranteed a play-off berth for the UEFA Euro 2024 qualifying. They suffered disappointment in their UEFA Euro 2024 qualifying group that saw three managers: Faruk Hadžibegić, Meho Kodro and Savo Milošević pick up only one win each for a total of 9 points and entered the playoffs. Bosnia and Herzegovina failed to qualify for UEFA Euro 2024 after conceding two late goals, losing 2–1 to Ukraine.

=== 2026 FIFA World Cup ===
In April 2024, former national team captain Sergej Barbarez was appointed manager. He debuted in friendlies against England and Italy. After relegation from the 2024–25 UEFA Nations League A (posting their worst loss in history to Germany), Bosnia and Herzegovina played well in their 2026 FIFA World Cup qualifying. Following their victory over Romania at home on 15 November, Barbarez's side needed to defeat Austria in the final group match to qualify directly for the World Cup. Despite holding on to a 1–0 lead until the 77th minute, the match ended in a draw. As a result, Barbarez's team finished second in the group, two points behind Austria, securing a spot in the playoffs. In the playoffs, they defeated both Wales and Italy on penalties, qualifying for the 2026 World Cup and marking their second appearance as an independent nation.

UEFA Play-offs final:

31 March 2026

Bosnia and Herzegovina	1–1 (a.e.t.)	Italy
Tabaković 79'	Report (FIFA); Report (UEFA)	Kean 15'
Penalties
Tahirović (penalty scored); Tabaković (penalty scored); Alajbegović (penalty scored); Bajraktarević (penalty scored)	4–1	(penalty missed) Esposito; (penalty scored) Tonali; (penalty missed) Cristante

Bilino Polje Stadium, Zenica
Attendance: 9,500
Referee: Clément Turpin (France)

At the tournament, Bosnia and Herzegovina finished in third with four points following a victory over Qatar (2023 AFC Asian Cup champion) as one of the eight best third-place teams, allowing them to progress to the knockout stage; a historic first for the nation.

Pos	Team	Pld	W	D	L	GF	GA	GD	Pts	Qualification
1	Switzerland	3	2	1	0	7	3	+4	7	Advance to knockout stage
2	Canada (H)	3	1	1	1	8	3	+5	4 (Note: Tied on head-to-head result (Canada 1–1 Bosnia and Herzegovina). Overall goal difference was used as the tiebreaker.)	Advance to knockout stage
3	Bosnia and Herzegovina	3	1	1	1	5	6	−1	4	Advance to knockout stage
4	Qatar	3	0	1	2	2	10	−8	1	

Source: FIFA
Rules for classification: Group stage tiebreakers
(H) Hosts
Notes:

In the round of 32, Bosnia and Herzegovina played against the United States. In the 45th minute, the US took the lead when Folarin Balogun scored. In the 64th minute, Balogun was sent-off with a straight red card after fouling Tarik Muharemović. Despite numerical superiority, Bosnia and Herzegovina struggled to convert their advantage, before Malik Tillman made it 2–0 in the 82nd minute when he scored from a free-kick, ensuring the US' progress to the round of 16.

== Team image ==
=== Nickname ===
A popular nickname of all Bosnian national teams is "Zmajevi" (the Dragons), in reference to the military commander Husein Gradaščević, the "Dragon of Bosnia", who led an uprising against the Ottoman Empire in the 19th century. The term was originally popularised by football TV commentator Mustafa Mijajlović during the Belgium vs. Bosnia and Herzegovina (2–4) 2010 WC qualification game on 28 March 2009.

In both local and foreign media, they are sometimes referred to as the Golden Lilies, which was the original nickname given to all of the country's national teams by fans after independence, in reference to the official state insignia at the time (the flag and the coat of arms), which itself referred to the golden lily, the historical state insignia that was featured on the coat of arms of the ruling Bosnian medieval Kotromanić dynasty.

=== Home stadiums ===
Currently, the national team uses Bilino Polje Stadium as its main home ground. The stadium has a capacity of 15,292. The stadium has a grass surface. There are plans for a new stadium at the same site.

Other stadiums Bosnia and Herzegovina has used are Grbavica Stadium and Koševo City Stadium.

Its training ground for domestic matches is the Bosnia and Herzegovina FA Training Centre in Zenica, which was opened in 2013 in conjunction with UEFA.

Bosnia-Herzegovina national team home stadiums

Bilino Polje Stadium
Zenica

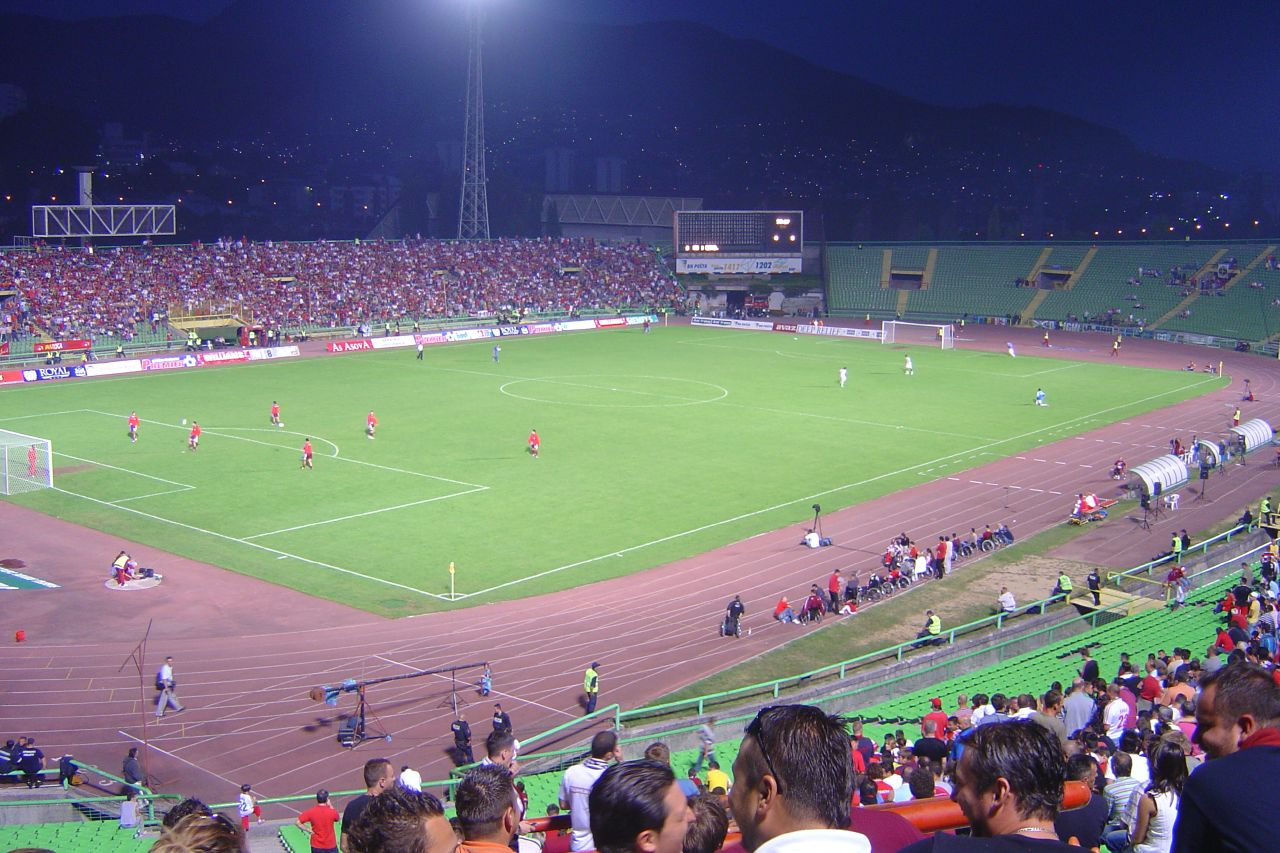
Koševo Stadium
Sarajevo

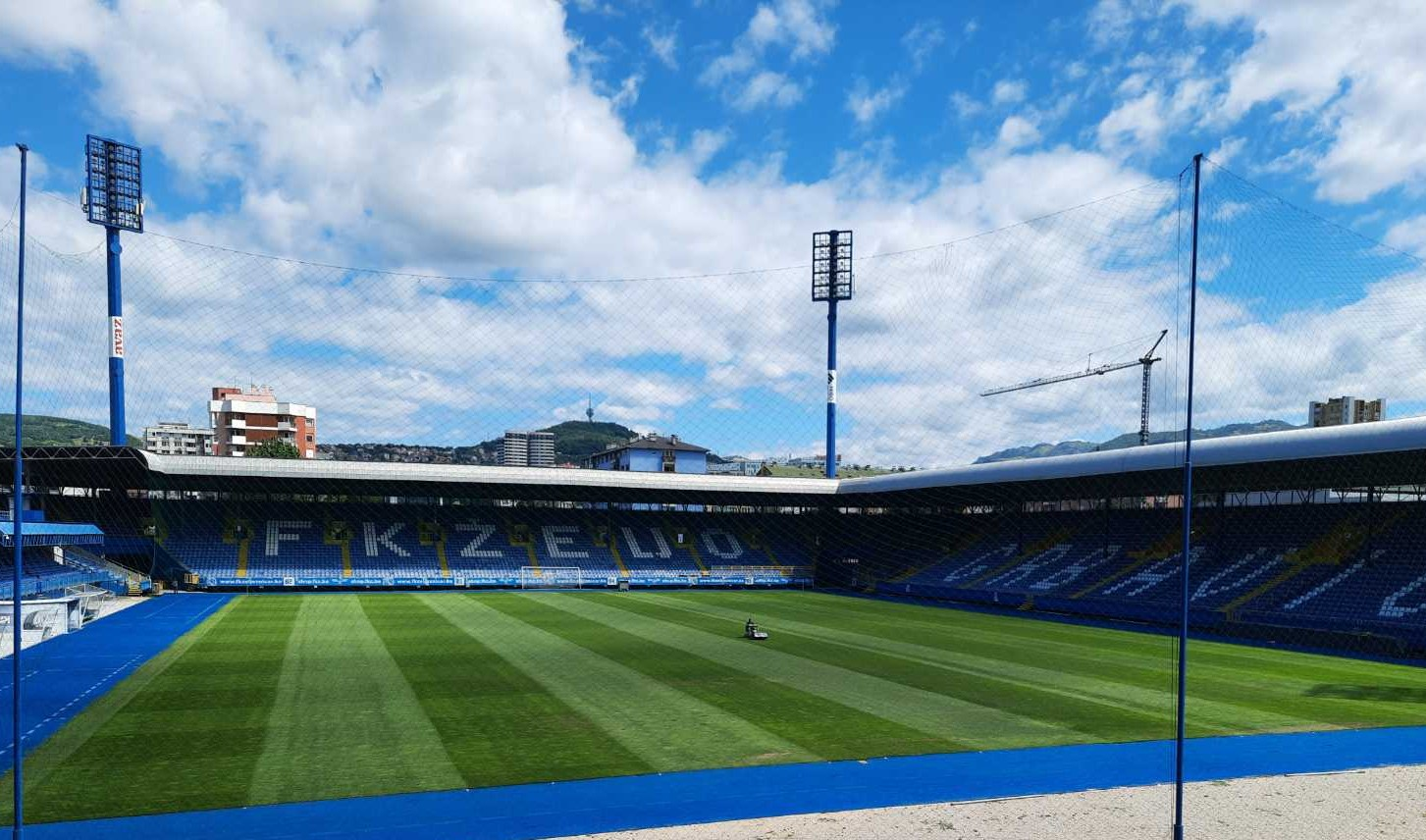
Stadion Grbavica
Sarajevo

=== Supporters ===
A large number of the national team's supporters come from Northern and Western Europe, North America, and Australia, particularly among their sizeable Bosnian diaspora communities. Most fans are members of BHFanaticos, Belaj Boys, BHLegion, Armija Zmajeva (Dragons Army) and Ljuti Krajišnici groups.

=== Kits ===
Bosnia and Herzegovina's traditional kit colours are blue and white, taken from the country's flag.

The team kit is currently produced by Spanish sports company Kelme. The general sponsor of the team is m:tel. Also sponsoring the team are Coca-Cola, ASA Osiguranje, and Privredna banka Sarajevo.

The table below shows the history of kit manufacturers for the national football team of Bosnia and Herzegovina:

Period	Kit Provider
1996–1999	(Belgium) Patrick
1999–2000	(Germany) Adidas
2000–2005	(Germany) Reusch
2005–2014	(Italy) Legea
2014–2023	(Germany) Adidas
2023–present	(Spain) Kelme

== Results and fixtures ==
The following is a list of match results in the last 12 months, as well as any future matches that have been scheduled.

Win Draw Loss Fixture

=== 2026 ===
26 March 2026 World Cup qualification play-offs	Wales	1–1 (a.e.t.) (2–4 p)	Bosnia and Herzegovina	Cardiff, Wales
19:45 WET (UTC+00:00)	D. James 51'	Report	Džeko 86'	Stadium: Cardiff City Stadium; Attendance: 32,487; Referee: István Kovács (Romania)
	Penalties
	Wilson (penalty scored); Harris (penalty scored); Johnson (penalty missed); Williams (penalty missed)		(penalty missed) Demirović; (penalty scored) Tabaković; (penalty scored) Bašić; (penalty scored) Hadžiahmetović; (penalty scored) Alajbegović

31 March 2026 World Cup qualification play-offs	Bosnia and Herzegovina	1–1 (a.e.t.) (4–1 p)	Italy	Zenica, Bosnia and Herzegovina
20:45 CEST (UTC+02:00)	Tabaković 79'	Report (FIFA); Report (UEFA)	Kean 15'	Stadium: Stadion Bilino Polje; Attendance: 9,500; Referee: Clément Turpin (France)
	Penalties
	Tahirović (penalty scored); Tabaković (penalty scored); Alajbegović (penalty scored); Bajraktarević (penalty scored)		(penalty missed) Esposito; (penalty scored) Tonali; (penalty missed) Cristante

29 May Friendly	Bosnia and Herzegovina	0–0	North Macedonia	Sarajevo, Bosnia and Herzegovina
20:30 CEST (UTC+02:00)		Report		Stadium: Stadion Koševo; Attendance: 28,961; Referee: Rade Obrenović (Slovenia)

6 June Friendly	Bosnia and Herzegovina	1–1	Panama	St. Louis, United States
14:00 CDT (UTC−05:00)	Katić 24'	Report	Ramos 45+2'	Stadium: Energizer Park; Attendance: 20,000; Referee: Luis Enrique Santander (Mexico)

12 June 2026 FIFA World Cup	Canada	1–1	Bosnia and Herzegovina	Toronto, Canada
15:00 EDT (UTC−04:00)	Larin 78'	Report	Lukić 21'	Stadium: BMO Field; Attendance: 43,002; Referee: Facundo Tello (Argentina)

18 June 2026 FIFA World Cup	Switzerland	4–1	Bosnia and Herzegovina	Inglewood, United States
12:00 PDT (UTC−07:00)	Manzambi 74', 90'; Vargas 84'; Xhaka 90+7' (pen.)	Report	Mahmić 90+3'	Stadium: SoFi Stadium; Attendance: 70,026; Referee: João Pinheiro (Portugal)

24 June 2026 FIFA World Cup	Bosnia and Herzegovina	3–1	Qatar	Seattle, United States
12:00 PDT (UTC−07:00)	Alajbegović 29'; Abunada 34' (o.g.); Mahmić 80'	Report	Al-Haydos 42'	Stadium: Lumen Field; Attendance: 66,925; Referee: Jesús Valenzuela (Venezuela)

1 July 2026 FIFA World Cup	United States	2–0	Bosnia and Herzegovina	Santa Clara, United States
17:00 PDT (UTC−07:00)	Balogun 45'; Tillman 82'	Report		Stadium: Levi's Stadium; Attendance: 68,827; Referee: Raphael Claus (Brazil)

25 September 2026–27 UEFA Nations League	Poland	0–0	Bosnia and Herzegovina	Warsaw, Poland
20:45 CEST (UTC+02:00)		Report		Stadium: Stadion Narodowy; Attendance: 46,775; Referee: Anastasios Papapetrou (Greece)

28 September 2026–27 UEFA Nations League	Romania	2–4	Bosnia and Herzegovina	Bucharest, Romania
21:45 EEST (UTC+03:00)	Bîrligea 28'; Cicâldău 62'	Report	Gigović 12'; Muharemović 19'; Tabaković 40'; Mahmić 55'	Stadium: Arena Națională; Attendance: 0 Referee: Luis Godinho (Portugal)

2 October 2026–27 UEFA Nations League	Bosnia and Herzegovina	1–1	Sweden	Zenica, Bosnia and Herzegovina
20:45 CEST (UTC+02:00)	Alajbegović 80'	Report	Gyökeres 61'	Stadium: Stadion Bilino Polje; Attendance: 11,700; Referee: Oleksii Derevinskyi (Ukraine)

5 October 2026–27 UEFA Nations League	Bosnia and Herzegovina	1–0	Poland	Zenica, Bosnia and Herzegovina
20:45 CEST (UTC+02:00)	Bašić 84' (pen.)	Report		Stadium: Stadion Bilino Polje; Attendance: 11,700; Referee: Jérémie Pignard (France)

14 November 2026–27 UEFA Nations League	Sweden	3–2	Bosnia and Herzegovina	Solna, Sweden
20:45 CET (UTC+01:00)	Svensson 5'; Gyökeres 11' (pen.), 45+2' (pen.)	Report	Gigović 47'; Kolašinac 62'	Stadium: Nationalarenan; Attendance: 51,049; Referee: Simone Sozza (Italy)

17 November 2026–27 UEFA Nations League	Bosnia and Herzegovina	2–1	Romania	Zenica, Bosnia and Herzegovina
20:45 CET (UTC+01:00)	Tahirović 44'; Bajraktarević 82'	Report	Bîrligea 6'	Stadium: Stadion Bilino Polje; Attendance: 11,460; Referee: José María Sánchez Martínez (Spain)

=== 2027 ===
25 March 2026–27 UEFA Nations League play-offs	Bosnia and Herzegovina	v	Denmark	Bosnia and Herzegovina
20:45 CET (UTC+01:00)		Report

28 March 2026–27 UEFA Nations League play-offs	Denmark	v	Bosnia and Herzegovina	Denmark
20:45 CEST (UTC+02:00)		Report

== Coaching staff ==
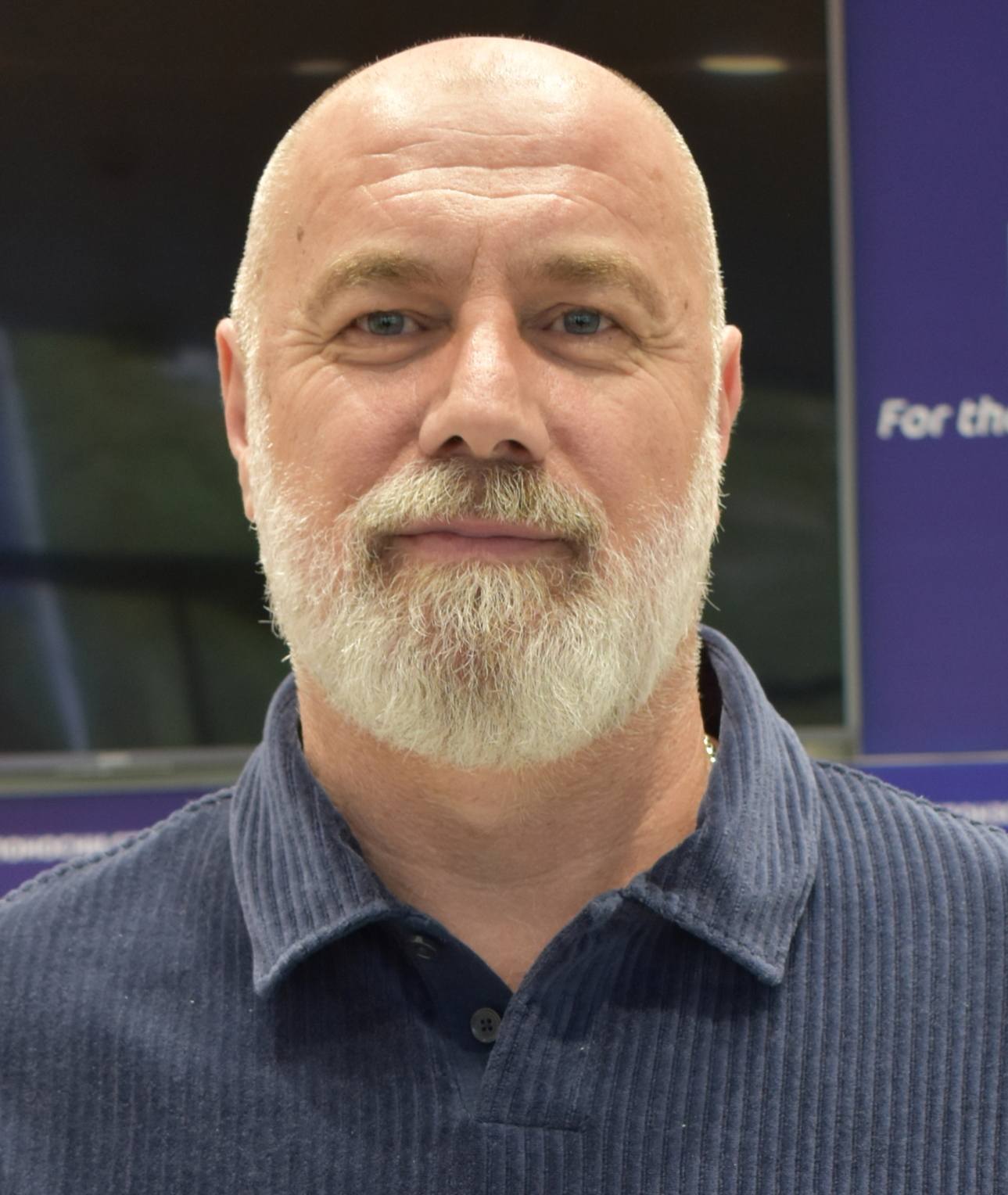
Sergej Barbarez

=== Current technical staff ===
Position	Name
Head coach	(Bosnia and Herzegovina) Sergej Barbarez
Assistant coaches	(Bosnia and Herzegovina) Zlatan Bajramović
Assistant coaches	(Bosnia and Herzegovina) Mirko Hrgović
Assistant coaches	(Bosnia and Herzegovina) Ninoslav Milenković
Goalkeeping coach	(Serbia) Branko Katić
Fitness coaches	(Bosnia and Herzegovina) Marko Čavka
Fitness coaches	(Bosnia and Herzegovina) Nedim Čović
Scouts	(Bosnia and Herzegovina) Siniša Mrkobrada
Scouts	(Bosnia and Herzegovina) Saša Papac
Video analysts	(Finland) Rasmus Jansson
Video analysts	(Serbia) Jasmin Kolašinac
Team doctors	(Bosnia and Herzegovina) Adnan Hadžimuratović
Team doctors	(Bosnia and Herzegovina) Reuf Karabeg
Physiotherapists	(Bosnia and Herzegovina) Siniša Ćebić
Physiotherapists	(Bosnia and Herzegovina) Ismar Hadžibajrić
Physiotherapists	(Bosnia and Herzegovina) Raif Zeba
Technical director	(Bosnia and Herzegovina) Emir Spahić
Team manager	(Bosnia and Herzegovina) Adi Osmanović
Media officer	(Bosnia and Herzegovina) Dinko Čeko

=== Coaching history ===
As of match played 17 November 2026

Name	From	To	P	W	D	L	GF	GA	GD	Win %	Achievements (Note: Table does not include results of minor tournaments (reserve players) managed by Husnija Arapović.)
(Bosnia and Herzegovina) Fuad Muzurović	30 November 1995	7 November 1997	18	7	2	9	21	25	−4	38.89	
(Bosnia and Herzegovina) Džemaludin Mušović	14 May 1998	27 January 1999	7	1	2	4	7	16	−9	14.29	
(Bosnia and Herzegovina) Faruk Hadžibegić	10 March 1999	9 October 1999	7	2	2	3	10	10	+0	28.57	
(Bosnia and Herzegovina) Avdo Kalajdžić (caretaker)	18 August 1999	18 August 1999	1	0	1	0	0	0	+0	0.00	
(Bosnia and Herzegovina) Mišo Smajlović	24 January 2000	1 January 2002	14	5	4	5	20	17	+3	35.71	
(Bosnia and Herzegovina) Blaž Slišković	27 March 2002	11 October 2006	37	11	11	15	44	56	−12	29.73	
(Bosnia and Herzegovina) Fuad Muzurović (Note: Due to an illness to Fuad Muzurović, assistant manager Borče Sredojević took charge of the team on 6 June 2007.)	21 December 2006	17 December 2007	9	3	0	6	11	16	−5	33.33	
(Bosnia and Herzegovina) Meho Kodro	5 January 2008	17 May 2008	2	0	1	1	2	5	−3	0.00	
(Bosnia and Herzegovina) Denijal Pirić (caretaker)	18 May 2008	30 June 2008	1	1	0	0	1	0	+1	100.00	
(Croatia) Miroslav Blažević	10 July 2008	12 December 2009	17	8	2	7	34	24	+10	47.06	
(Bosnia and Herzegovina) Safet Sušić	29 December 2009	17 November 2014	49	23	9	17	83	59	+24	46.94	2014 FIFA World Cup – Group stage
(Bosnia and Herzegovina) Mehmed Baždarević (Note: Due to a suspension of Mehmed Baždarević for unsportsmanlike behaviour, assistant manager Stéphane Gilli took charge of the team on 25 March 2017.)	13 December 2014	10 October 2017	25	14	5	6	53	30	+23	56.00	2016 Kirin Cup – Winners
(Croatia) Robert Prosinečki	4 January 2018	27 November 2019	22	9	6	7	29	21	+8	40.91	2018–19 UEFA Nations League B – Promoted
(Bosnia and Herzegovina) Dušan Bajević	21 December 2019	18 November 2020	8	0	3	5	4	14	−10	0.00	
(Bulgaria) Ivaylo Petev (Note: Due to Ivaylo Petev testing positive to COVID-19, assistant managers Elvir Rahimić and Slaven Musa took charge of the team on 27 and 31 March 2021, respectively.)	21 January 2021	31 December 2022	20	6	7	7	19	24	−5	30.00	2022–23 UEFA Nations League B – Promoted
(Bosnia and Herzegovina) Faruk Hadžibegić	4 January 2023	23 June 2023	4	1	0	3	3	7	−4	25.00	
(Bosnia and Herzegovina) Meho Kodro	3 August 2023	21 September 2023	2	1	0	1	2	2	+0	50.00	
(Serbia) Savo Milošević	29 September 2023	21 March 2024	5	1	0	4	5	13	−8	20.00	
(Bosnia and Herzegovina) Sergej Barbarez	19 April 2024	Present	32	12	9	11	44	49	−5	37.50	2026 FIFA World Cup – Round of 32
Total			280	105	64	111	392	388	+4	37.50	Five achievements

== Players ==
=== Current squad ===
The following players were called up for the 2026–27 UEFA Nations League B matches in November.

Caps and goals correct as of 17 November 2026, after the UEFA Nations League match against Romania.

No.	Pos.	Player	Date of birth (age)	Caps	Goals	Club
1	GK	Mladen Jurkas	7 October 2007 (age 19)	0	0	(Football Association of Bosnia and Herzegovina) Borac Banja Luka
12	GK	Salko Hamzić	17 September 2006 (age 20)	1	0	(Austrian Football Association) WSG Tirol
22	GK	Martin Zlomislić	16 August 1998 (age 28)	8	0	(Association of Football Federations of Azerbaijan) Qarabağ
2	DF	Nihad Mujakić	15 April 1998 (age 28)	13	1	(Turkish Football Federation) Erzurumspor
3	DF	Arjan Malić	28 August 2005 (age 21)	11	0	(Austrian Football Association) Sturm Graz
4	DF	Tarik Muharemović	28 February 2003 (age 23)	22	2	(The Football Association) Leeds United
5	DF	Sead Kolašinac (captain)	20 June 1993 (age 33)	74	1	(Italian Football Federation) Atalanta
7	DF	Amar Dedić	18 August 2002 (age 24)	33	1	(The Football Association) Newcastle United
18	DF	Nikola Katić	10 October 1996 (age 30)	27	2	(German Football Association) Schalke 04
21	DF	Stjepan Radeljić	5 September 1997 (age 29)	9	0	(Croatian Football Federation) Dinamo Zagreb
23	DF	Zinedin Smajlović	20 December 2003 (age 22)	4	0	(Hellenic Football Federation) Olympiacos
6	MF	Benjamin Tahirović	3 March 2003 (age 23)	37	3	(Royal Belgian Football Association) Genk
8	MF	Armin Gigović	6 April 2002 (age 24)	28	3	(Swiss Football Association) Young Boys
11	MF	Esmir Bajraktarević	10 March 2005 (age 21)	26	2	(Royal Dutch Football Association) PSV
13	MF	Ivan Bašić	30 April 2002 (age 24)	26	1	(Kazakhstan Football Federation) Astana
14	MF	Ivan Šunjić	9 October 1996 (age 30)	17	0	(Cyprus Football Association) Pafos
15	MF	Amar Memić	20 January 2001 (age 25)	23	1	(Football Association of the Czech Republic) Viktoria Plzeň
17	MF	Dženis Burnić	22 May 1998 (age 28)	22	0	(Hellenic Football Federation) Volos
19	MF	Kerim Alajbegović	21 September 2007 (age 19)	19	3	(Italian Football Federation) Juventus
20	MF	Ermin Mahmić	14 March 2005 (age 21)	11	3	(Turkish Football Federation) Çorum
9	FW	Samed Baždar	31 January 2004 (age 22)	16	1	(Royal Belgian Football Association) Sint-Truiden
10	FW	Ermedin Demirović	25 March 1998 (age 28)	50	4	(German Football Association) VfB Stuttgart
16	FW	Jovo Lukić	28 November 1998 (age 27)	10	1	(Romanian Football Federation) Universitatea Cluj
	FW	Haris Tabaković	20 June 1994 (age 32)	16	5	(Austrian Football Association) Red Bull Salzburg
	FW	Matej Deket	1 October 2009 (age 17)	0	0	(Football Association of Bosnia and Herzegovina) Borac Banja Luka

=== Recent call-ups ===
The following players have also been called up to the squad within the last twelve months:

Pos.	Player	Date of birth (age)	Caps	Goals	Club	Latest call-up
GK	Nikola Vasilj	2 December 1995 (age 30)	30	0	(Saudi Arabia) Al-Diriyah	v. Poland, 25 September 2026 ^{INJ}
GK	Osman Hadžikić	12 March 1996 (age 30)	0	0	(Hungary) Kispest Honvéd	2026 FIFA World Cup ^{INJ}
GK	Tarik Karić	19 September 2005 (age 21)	0	0	(Poland) Raków Częstochowa	2026 FIFA World Cup ^{PRE}
DF	Dennis Hadžikadunić	9 July 1998 (age 28)	33	0	(Croatia) Hajduk Split	v. Sweden, 14 November 2026 ^{INJ}
DF	Nidal Čelik	17 July 2006 (age 20)	2	0	(France) Lens	2026 FIFA World Cup ^{INJ}
DF	Jusuf Gazibegović	11 March 2000 (age 26)	23	0	(Poland) Widzew Łódź	2026 FIFA World Cup ^{PRE}
DF	Emir Karić	9 June 1997 (age 29)	1	0	(United States) Sporting Kansas City	2026 FIFA World Cup ^{PRE}
MF	Nail Omerović	20 October 2002 (age 24)	5	1	(Portugal) Estoril Praia	v. Poland, 5 October 2026
MF	Ajdin Hasić	7 October 2001 (age 25)	1	0	(Poland) Cracovia	v. Poland, 5 October 2026
MF	Luka Đurić	18 June 2003 (age 23)	0	0	(Germany) SC Paderborn	v. Poland, 5 October 2026
MF	Kenan Busuladžić	6 February 2007 (age 19)	0	0	(Sweden) Malmö FF	v. Poland, 25 September 2026 ^{INJ}
MF	Dino Beširović	31 January 1994 (age 32)	5	0	(Sweden) AIK	v. Poland, 25 September 2026 ^{PRE}
MF	Amir Hadžiahmetović	8 March 1997 (age 29)	37	0	(Bulgaria) Ludogorets Razgrad	2026 FIFA World Cup
MF	Amer Gojak	13 February 1997 (age 29)	35	4	(Croatia) Rijeka	2026 FIFA World Cup ^{PRE}
MF	Haris Hajradinović	18 February 1994 (age 32)	16	2	(Turkey) Kasımpaşa	2026 FIFA World Cup ^{PRE}
MF	Dario Šarić	30 May 1997 (age 29)	10	0	(Turkey) Antalyaspor	2026 FIFA World Cup ^{PRE}
MF	Ifet Đakovac	5 December 1997 (age 28)	1	0	(Serbia) Vojvodina	2026 FIFA World Cup ^{PRE}
FW	Edin Džeko	17 March 1986 (age 40)	152	73	(Germany) Schalke 04	v. Sweden, 2 October 2026 ^{RET}
Notes: ^{PRE} = Preliminary squad; ^{INJ} = Withdrawn due to injury or illness; ^{RET} = Retired from the national team; ^{SUS} = Suspended; ^{WD} = Withdrawn

== Individual records ==
As of 17 November 2026.
Players in bold are still active with Bosnia and Herzegovina.

=== Most appearances ===
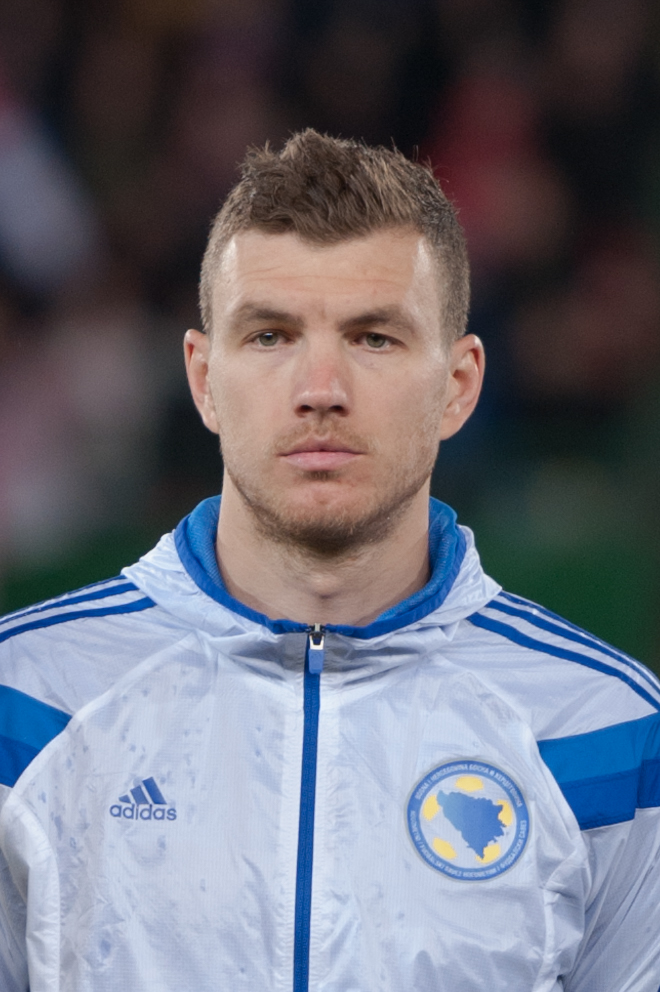
Edin Džeko is Bosnia and Herzegovina's most capped player and all-time top goal scorer.

Rank	Player	Caps	Goals	Career
1	Edin Džeko	152	73	2007–2026
2	Miralem Pjanić	115	18	2008–2024
3	Emir Spahić	94	6	2003–2018
4	Zvjezdan Misimović	85	25	2004–2018
5	Vedad Ibišević	83	28	2007–2018
6	**Sead Kolašinac**	74	1	2013–present
7	Asmir Begović	63	0	2009–2020
8	Haris Medunjanin	60	9	2009–2018
9	Senad Lulić	57	4	2008–2017
10	Ibrahim Šehić	55	0	2010–2024
10	Edin Višća	55	10	2010–2020

=== Top goalscorers ===
Rank	Player	Goals	Caps	Ratio	Career
1	Edin Džeko (list)	73	152	0.48	2007–2026
2	Vedad Ibišević	28	83	0.34	2007–2018
3	Zvjezdan Misimović	25	85	0.29	2004–2018
4	Elvir Bolić	22	51	0.43	1996–2006
5	Miralem Pjanić	18	115	0.16	2008–2024
6	Sergej Barbarez	17	47	0.36	1998–2006
7	Elvir Baljić	14	38	0.37	1996–2005
8	Zlatan Muslimović	12	30	0.4	2006–2011
9	Edin Višća	10	55	0.18	2010–2020
10	Haris Medunjanin	9	60	0.15	2009–2018

=== Most clean sheets ===
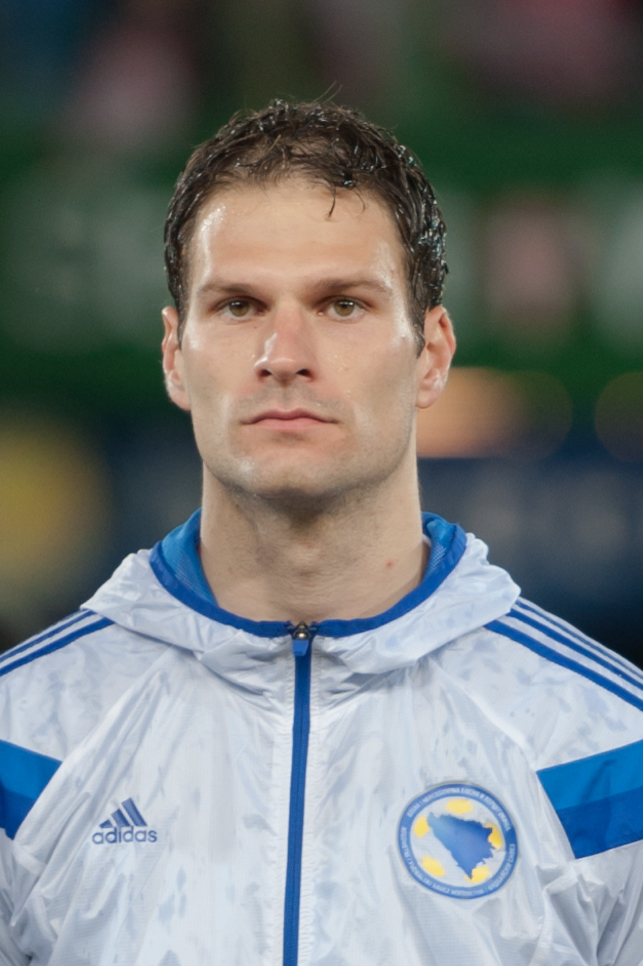
Asmir Begović is Bosnia and Herzegovina's record holder in clean sheets.

Rank	Player	Clean Sheets	Caps	Ratio	Career
1	Asmir Begović	27	63	0.43	2009–2020
2	Ibrahim Šehić	19	55	0.35	2010–2024
3	Kenan Hasagić	13	44	0.3	2002–2011
4	Mirsad Dedić	8	27	0.3	1996–2000
5	**Nikola Vasilj**	7	30	0.23	2021–present
6	Goran Brašnić	5	8	0.63	2004–2008
6	Adnan Gušo	5	23	0.22	1999–2007
8	Tomislav Piplica	4	8	0.5	2001–2002
8	Almir Tolja	4	15	0.27	2000–2006
10	Jasmin Burić	3	3	1	2008–2020
10	Kenan Pirić	3	8	0.38	2018–2024
10	**Martin Zlomislić**	3	8	0.38	2024–present

=== Captains ===
Emir Spahić captained Bosnia and Herzegovina at their first FIFA World Cup tournament. This is a list of Bosnia and Herzegovina captains for ten or more matches.

Note: Some of the other players to have captained the team include: Mehmed Baždarević (2 caps) 1996, Meho Kodro (5) 1997 to 1998, Vlatko Glavaš (1) 1997, Suvad Katana (2) 1998, Elvir Bolić (6) 1999 to 2000, Bruno Akrapović (4) 1999 to 2003, Hasan Salihamidžić (1) 2004, Zlatan Bajramović (1) 2006, Džemal Berberović (1) 2007, Asmir Begović (6) 2011 to 2020, Haris Medunjanin (4) 2016 to 2018, Vedad Ibišević (1) 2017, Miralem Pjanić (6) 2019 to 2021, Ermin Bičakčić (2) 2019 to 2024, Sead Kolašinac (9) 2021 to 2026, Ibrahim Šehić (3) 2021 to 2023, Siniša Saničanin (1) 2021, Eldar Ćivić (1) 2021, Adnan Kovačević (1) 2021, Ajdin Nukić (1) 2021, Smail Prevljak (1) 2022, Rade Krunić (1) 2023, Gojko Cimirot (1) 2023, Ermedin Demirović (3) 2024 to 2025, Amar Dedić (3) 2025 to 2026, Tarik Muharemović (1) 2026.

Player	Period	Games as captain	Notes
Muhamed Konjić	1995–2002	20	First official captain of the Bosnia and Herzegovina national football team
Mirsad Hibić	2000–2003	14	
Sergej Barbarez	2004–2006	20	
Emir Spahić	2006–2014	55	First official captain of the team in a major tournament (2014 FIFA World Cup)
Zvjezdan Misimović	2007–2012	16	
Edin Džeko	2014–2026	81	

Table correct as of match played on 17 November 2026.

== Competitive record ==
=== FIFA World Cup ===
FIFA World Cup record										Qualification record						
Year	Round	Position	Pld	W	D	L	GF	GA	Squad	Pld	W	D	L	GF	GA	Position
1930 to 1990	Part of Yugoslavia									Part of Yugoslavia						
(United States) 1994	Did not enter									Did not enter						
(France) 1998	Did not qualify									8	3	0	5	9	14	4/5
(South Korea) (Japan) 2002	Did not qualify									8	2	2	4	12	12	4/5
(Germany) 2006	Did not qualify									10	4	4	2	12	9	3/6
(South Africa) 2010	Did not qualify									12	6	1	5	25	15	2/6 Lost play-offs
(Brazil) 2014	Group stage	20th	3	1	0	2	4	4	Squad	10	8	1	1	30	6	1/6
(Russia) 2018	Did not qualify									10	5	2	3	24	13	3/6
(Qatar) 2022	Did not qualify									8	1	4	3	9	12	4/5
(Canada) (Mexico) (United States) 2026	Round of 32	29th	4	1	1	2	5	8	Squad	10	5	4	1	19	9	2/5 Won play-offs
(Morocco) (Portugal) (Spain) 2030	To be determined									To be determined						
(Saudi Arabia) 2034	To be determined									To be determined						
Total: 2/9	Round of 32	—	7	2	1	4	9	12	—	76	34	18	24	140	90	—

=== UEFA European Championship ===
UEFA European Championship record									Qualification record						
Year	Round	Position	Pld	W	D	L	GF	GA	Pld	W	D	L	GF	GA	Position
1960 to 1992	Part of Yugoslavia								Part of Yugoslavia						
(England) 1996	Did not enter								Did not enter						
(Belgium) (Netherlands) 2000	Did not qualify								10	3	2	5	14	17	3/6
(Portugal) 2004	Did not qualify								8	4	1	3	7	8	4/5
(Austria) (Switzerland) 2008	Did not qualify								12	4	1	7	16	22	4/7
(Poland) (Ukraine) 2012	Did not qualify								12	6	3	3	19	14	2/6 Lost play-offs
(France) 2016	Did not qualify								12	5	3	4	18	15	3/6 Lost play-offs
(Europe) 2020	Did not qualify								11	4	2	5	21	18	4/6 Lost play-offs
(Germany) 2024	Did not qualify								11	3	0	8	10	22	5/6 Lost play-offs
(England) (Scotland) (Republic of Ireland) (Wales) 2028	To be determined								To be determined						
(Italy) (Turkey) 2032	To be determined								To be determined						
Total	—	—	—	—	—	—	—	—	76	29	12	35	105	116	—

=== UEFA Nations League ===
UEFA Nations League record
Season	Division	Group	Pld	W	D	L	GF	GA	P/R	Rank
2018–19	B	3	4	3	1	0	5	1	▲	13th
2020–21	A	1	6	0	2	4	3	11	▼	15th
2022–23	B	3	6	3	2	1	8	8	▲	18th
2024–25	A	3	6	0	2	4	4	17	▼	16th
2026–27	B	4	6	3	2	1	10	7	TBD	22nd
2026–27	B	Promotion play-off	0	0	0	0	0	0	TBD	22nd
Total			28	9	8	10	30	44	13th	

=== Minor tournaments ===
Minor tournaments record
Tournament	Round	Position	Pld	W	D	L	GF	GA
1997 Dunhill Cup Malaysia	Runners-up	2nd	5	3	1	1	9	5
(India) 2001 Millennium Soccer Cup	Runners-up	2nd	5	3	1	1	7	5
(Malaysia) 2001 Merdeka Tournament	Runners-up	2nd	5	3	1	1	7	4
(Iran) 2001 LG Cup	Runners-up	2nd	2	1	0	1	4	6
(Japan) 2016 Kirin Cup	Winners	1st	2	1	1	0	4	3
Total	1 Title	–	19	11	4	4	31	23

=== FIFA ranking history ===
FIFA-ranking yearly averages for Bosnia and Herzegovina. Their average position since FIFA World Ranking creation is 58.

Year	Position	Highest	Lowest
1996	152	152	173
1997	99	99	139
1998	96	91	102
1999	75	74	78
2000	78	74	83
2001	69	69	79
2002	87	71	87
2003	59	53	88
2004	79	58	81
2005	65	65	81
2006	59	42	65
2007	51	25	58
2008	61	51	75
2009	51	33	61
2010	44	44	59
2011	20	20	56
2012	27	19	31
2013	19	13	26
2014	29	17	29
2015	22	20	32
2016	27	20	29
2017	37	27	40
2018	34	32	41
2019	49	35	49
2020	55	49	55
2021	61	55	61
2022	57	57	59
2023	69	57	69
2024	74	71	75
2025	71	70	75

View source data.

== Head-to-head record ==
Key

More wins than losses
As many wins as losses
Fewer wins than losses
Bosnia and Herzegovina's all-time international record, 1995–present

Opponent	Pld	W	D	L	GF	GA	GD	First game	Last game	Biggest win	Biggest loss
Albania	5	2	2	1	5	4	+1	30 Nov 1995	28 Mar 2017	2–0	0–2
Algeria	1	1	0	0	1	0	+1	14 Nov 2012		1–0	—N/a
Andorra	2	2	0	0	6	0	+6	28 Mar 2015	6 Sep 2015	3–0	—N/a
Argentina	3	0	0	3	1	9	−8	14 May 1998	15 Jun 2014	—N/a	0–5
Armenia	4	3	0	1	10	6	+4	15 Oct 2008	8 Sep 2019	4–1	2–4
Austria	7	1	4	2	5	7	−2	24 Mar 2001	18 Nov 2025	1–0	0–2
Azerbaijan	1	1	0	0	1	0	+1	1 Jun 2008		1–0	—N/a
Bahrain	1	1	0	0	1	0	+1	23 Jun 2001		1–0	—N/a
Bangladesh	1	1	0	0	2	0	+2	12 Jan 2001		2–0	—N/a
Belarus	2	2	0	0	3	0	+3	2 Sep 2011	6 Sep 2011	2–0	—N/a
Belgium	8	3	1	4	13	19	−6	26 Mar 2005	7 Oct 2017	4–2	0–4
Brazil	2	0	0	2	1	3	−2	18 Dec 1996	28 Feb 2012	—N/a	1–2
Bulgaria	2	1	0	1	2	2	0	20 Aug 2008	23 Mar 2018	1–0	1–2
Canada	1	0	1	0	1	1	0	12 Jun 2026		—N/a	—N/a
Chile	1	1	0	0	1	0	+1	22 Jan 2001		1–0	—N/a
China	1	0	0	1	0	3	−3	2 Mar 1997		—N/a	0–3
Costa Rica	1	0	1	0	0	0	0	27 Mar 2021		—N/a	—N/a
Croatia	4	0	0	4	6	14	−8	8 Oct 1996	22 Aug 2007	—N/a	1–4
Czech Republic	2	0	0	2	1	6	−5	10 Oct 1998	8 Sep 1999	—N/a	0–3
Cyprus	6	3	1	2	12	10	+2	9 Sep 2014	9 Oct 2025	2–0	2–3
Denmark	6	2	2	2	8	7	+1	8 Jun 1997	6 Jun 2021	3–0	0–2
Egypt	1	0	0	1	0	2	−2	5 Mar 2014		—N/a	0–2
England	1	0	0	1	0	3	−3	3 Jun 2024		—N/a	0–3
Estonia	7	5	1	1	21	4	+17	5 Sep 1998	10 Oct 2017	7–0	0–1
Faroe Islands	2	1	1	0	3	2	+1	19 Aug 1998	9 Jun 1999	1–0	—N/a
Finland	7	3	2	2	12	11	+1	28 Apr 2004	14 Jun 2022	4–1	1–3
France	6	0	3	3	4	8	−4	18 Aug 2004	1 Sep 2021	—N/a	0–2
Georgia	1	0	0	1	0	1	−1	25 Mar 2022	25 Mar 2022	—N/a	0–1
Germany	4	0	1	3	3	13	−10	11 Oct 2002	16 Nov 2024	—N/a	0–7
Ghana	1	1	0	0	2	1	+1	3 Mar 2010		2–1	—N/a
Gibraltar	2	2	0	0	9	0	+9	25 Mar 2017	3 Sep 2017	5–0	—N/a
Greece	11	1	5	5	9	17	−8	1 Sep 1996	15 Oct 2019	3–1	0–4
Hungary	6	0	3	3	3	8	−5	10 Mar 1999	14 Oct 2024	—N/a	1–3
Iceland	2	1	0	1	3	1	+2	23 Mar 2023	11 Sep 2023	3–0	0–1
Indonesia	1	1	0	0	2	0	+2	26 Feb 1997		2–0	—N/a
Iran	7	1	1	5	10	19	−9	22 Jul 2001	12 Nov 2020	3–1	0–4
Israel	4	1	1	2	4	7	−3	11 Oct 2000	12 Jun 2015	3–1	0–3
Italy	7	1	2	4	4	11	−6	6 Nov 1996	31 Mar 2026	2–1	0–3
Ivory Coast	1	1	0	0	2	1	+1	30 May 2014		2–1	—N/a
Japan	3	1	1	1	4	6	−2	28 Feb 2006	7 Jun 2016	2–1	0–3
Jordan	2	1	1	0	2	1	+1	11 Mar 2000	15 Mar 2000	2–1	—N/a
Kazakhstan	2	1	1	0	4	2	+2	7 Sep 2021	9 Oct 2021	2–0	—N/a
Kuwait	1	1	0	0	1	0	+1	4 Sep 2021		1–0	—N/a
Latvia	2	2	0	0	9	1	+8	11 Sep 2012	7 Jun 2013	5–0	—N/a
Liechtenstein	10	9	1	0	35	3	+32	18 Aug 1999	13 Oct 2023	8–1	—N/a
Lithuania	6	4	1	1	10	5	+5	14 Oct 1998	16 Oct 2013	3–0	2–4
Luxembourg	9	7	0	2	18	7	+11	29 Mar 2003	16 Nov 2023	5–0	1–4
Malaysia	3	2	1	0	5	2	+3	28 Feb 1997	27 Jun 2001	2–0	—N/a
Malta	5	4	0	1	13	5	+8	27 Jan 1999	12 Oct 2025	5–2	1–2
Mexico	4	1	0	3	2	5	−3	9 Feb 2011	1 Feb 2018	1–0	0–2
Moldova	2	0	1	1	2	3	−1	7 Oct 2006	12 Sep 2007	—N/a	0–1
Montenegro	4	1	3	0	2	1	+1	28 May 2018	23 Sep 2022	1–0	—N/a
Netherlands	4	0	2	2	4	9	−5	11 Oct 2020	19 Nov 2024	—N/a	1–3
Nigeria	1	0	0	1	0	1	−1	21 Jun 2014		—N/a	0–1
North Macedonia	6	1	4	1	8	8	0	3 Jun 1998	29 May 2026	1–0	0–1
Northern Ireland	3	2	1	0	5	2	+3	8 Sep 2018	8 Oct 2020	2–0	—N/a
Norway	4	2	0	2	3	5	−2	16 Oct 2002	17 Oct 2007	2–1	0–2
Oman	1	1	0	0	2	1	+1	9 Jun 2009		2–1	—N/a
Panama	1	0	1	0	1	1	0	6 Jun 2026		—N/a	—N/a
Paraguay	1	0	0	1	0	3	−3	21 Apr 1996		—N/a	0–3
Poland	7	1	2	4	4	9	−5	15 Dec 2007	25 Sep 2026	1–0	0–3
Portugal	6	0	1	5	2	16	−14	14 Nov 2009	16 Oct 2023	—N/a	0–5
Qatar	3	1	1	1	4	4	0	24 Jan 2000	24 Jun 2026	3–1	0–2
Republic of Ireland	3	0	1	2	1	4	−3	26 May 2012	16 Nov 2015	—N/a	0–2
Romania	10	6	0	4	14	17	−3	7 Sep 2002	17 Nov 2026	4–2	1–4
San Marino	4	4	0	0	13	1	+12	4 Jun 2005	6 Sep 2025	6–0	—N/a
Scotland	2	0	0	2	1	3	−2	4 Sep 1999	5 Oct 1999	—N/a	1–2
Senegal	1	0	1	0	0	0	0	27 Mar 2018		—N/a	—N/a
Serbia and Montenegro	5	0	2	3	1	6	−5	14 Jan 2001	12 Oct 2005	—N/a	0–2
Slovakia	6	3	0	3	7	8	−1	20 Jun 2001	26 Mar 2023	3–2	0–2
Slovenia	5	4	0	1	11	6	+5	10 Nov 1996	6 Feb 2013	3–0	1–2
South Africa	1	1	0	0	4	2	+2	8 Aug 2001		4–2	—N/a
South Korea	2	1	0	1	3	3	0	26 May 2006	01 Jun 2018	3–1	0–2
Spain	8	0	2	6	7	18	−11	2 Sep 2000	18 Nov 2018	—N/a	2–5
Sweden	3	0	1	2	5	8	−3	29 May 2010	14 November 2026	—N/a	2–4
Switzerland	2	1	0	1	3	4	−1	29 Mar 2016	18 Jun 2026	2–0	1–4
Tunisia	1	0	0	1	1	2	−1	5 Nov 1997		—N/a	1–2
Turkey	6	2	2	2	7	6	+1	16 Aug 2000	11 Oct 2018	2–0	0–1
Ukraine	3	0	1	2	2	5	−3	12 Oct 2021	21 Mar 2024	—N/a	0–2
United States	4	0	1	3	3	7	−4	14 Aug 2013	1 Jul 2026	—N/a	0–2
Uruguay	1	1	0	0	3	2	+1	18 Jan 2001		3–2	—N/a
Uzbekistan	2	0	1	1	1	2	−1	30 Jun 2001	1 Jun 2009	—N/a	1–2
Vietnam	1	1	0	0	4	0	+4	22 Feb 1997		4–0	—N/a
Wales	5	2	3	0	7	3	+4	12 Feb 2003	26 Mar 2026	2–0	—N/a
Zimbabwe	1	0	1	0	2	2	0	24 Feb 1997		—N/a	—N/a
85 countries	297	111	70	116	412	407	+5	30 Nov 1995	17 Nov 2026	8–1	0–7

=== Notable victories ===
Source: Results

- Unofficial games not included.

Date	Tournament	Place	Opponents	Score	Additional Notes
15 October 2013	2014 FIFA World Cup qualification	Kaunas, Lithuania	Lithuania	1–0	Qualified to 2014 FIFA World Cup
25 June 2014	2014 FIFA World Cup	Salvador, Brazil	Iran	3–1	Historic first victory in FIFA World Cup
31 March 2026	2026 FIFA World Cup qualification	Zenica, Bosnia and Herzegovina	Italy	1–1 (Note: Victory following penalties.)	Qualified to 2026 FIFA World Cup
24 June 2026	2026 FIFA World Cup	Seattle, United States	Qatar	3–1	Advanced to FIFA World Cup knockout stage

==== Other victories of note ====
Date	Tournament	Place	Opponents	Score	Additional Notes
6 November 1996	Friendly	Sarajevo, Bosnia and Herzegovina	Italy	2–1	Victory over top 5 ranked team at the time (5th)
10 November 1996	1998 FIFA World Cup qualification	Ljubljana, Slovenia	Slovenia	2–1	Historic first victory in World Cup qualifiers
20 August 1997	1998 FIFA World Cup qualification	Sarajevo, Bosnia and Herzegovina	Denmark	3–0	Victory over top 5 ranked team at the time (3rd)
19 August 1998	UEFA Euro 2000 qualifying	Sarajevo, Bosnia and Herzegovina	Faroe Islands	1–0	Historic first victory in UEFA Euro qualifiers
2 June 2007	UEFA Euro 2008 qualifying	Sarajevo, Bosnia and Herzegovina	Turkey	3–2	Edin Džeko's debut senior cap and first international goal
10 September 2008	2010 FIFA World Cup qualification	Zenica, Bosnia and Herzegovina	Estonia	7–0	Largest ever victory (without conceding)
28 March 2009	2010 FIFA World Cup qualification	Genk, Belgium	Belgium	4–2	Game in which Edin Džeko is nicknamed Bosanski dijamant by TV commentator.
7 September 2012	2014 FIFA World Cup qualification	Vaduz, Lichtenstein	Liechtenstein	8–1	Largest ever victory
7 June 2016	2016 Kirin Cup	Osaka, Japan	Japan	2–1	Victory in the 2016 Kirin Cup Final

Note: In its history Bosnia and Herzegovina national football team has beaten teams ranked high in FIFA standings; Italy 5th (1996), Denmark 3rd (1997), Greece 12th (2013), Wales 8th (2015), Switzerland 12th (2016), Italy 12th (2026).

== Honours ==
=== Friendly ===
- Millennium Super Cup
  - Runners-up (1): 2001
- Kirin Cup
  - Champions (1): 2016

== See also ==
- Bosnia and Herzegovina national under-21 football team
- Bosnia and Herzegovina national under-19 football team
- Bosnia and Herzegovina national under-17 football team
- Bosnia and Herzegovina national under-15 football team
- Bosnia and Herzegovina women's national football team
- Bosnia and Herzegovina women's national under-19 football team
- Bosnia and Herzegovina women's national under-17 football team
- Bosnian footballer of the year award – Idol of the nation
