= List of international goals scored by Edin Džeko =

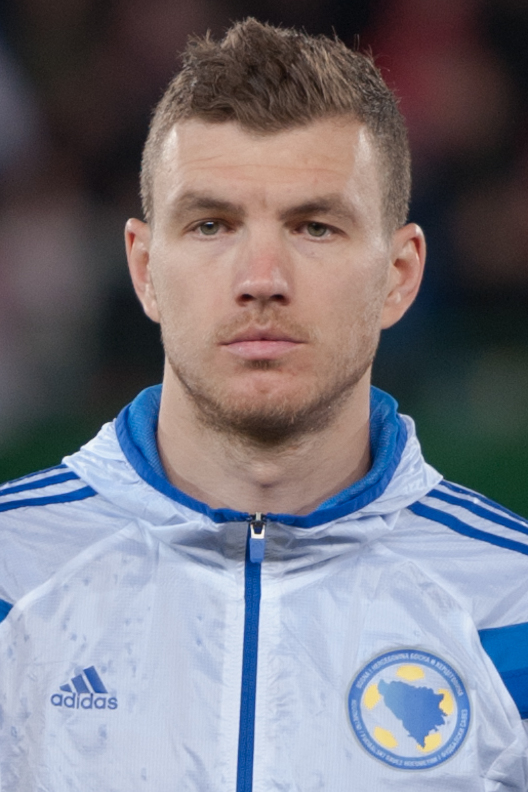
Džeko with Bosnia and Herzegovina in 2015

Edin Džeko is a Bosnian professional footballer who represented the Bosnia and Herzegovina national team as a forward between 2007 and 2026. He made his international debut in a 3–2 UEFA Euro 2008 qualifying home win over Turkey on 2 June 2007. He also scored his first international goal during the match, levelling the score at 2–2 in stoppage time of the first half. His final appearance came in a 1–1 UEFA Nations League home draw against Sweden on 2 October 2026. In total, Džeko scored 73 goals in 152 international appearances, making him Bosnia and Herzegovina's all-time leading goalscorer. He also ranks 19th on the all-time men's international goalscoring list, and eighth in the list of UEFA players.

On 8 September 2012, Džeko scored his first international hat-trick in an 8–1 World Cup qualification win away to Liechtenstein. This brought him up to 24 international goals, surpassing the previous record of 22 set by Elvir Bolić and Zvjezdan Misimović. Liechtenstein was also the team that Džeko scored more times against than any other, with eight goals against the nation.

The majority of Džeko's goals came in qualifying matches. He scored 31 goals in FIFA World Cup qualifiers, including nine during 2010 World Cup qualification, the joint second-most for a UEFA player (tied with England's Wayne Rooney and one behind Greece's Theofanis Gekas), and ten during 2014 qualification, also the second-most (one behind Netherlands' Robin van Persie). Džeko scored seventeen goals in European Championship qualifiers (including one in the 2016 play-offs), and nine goals in the UEFA Nations League. He scored once at the World Cup finals, getting the opener in a 3–1 win against Iran during the 2014 group stage. The remainder of Džeko's goals, fifteen, came in friendlies.

== International goals ==
Scores and results list Bosnia and Herzegovina's goal tally first, score column indicates score after each Džeko goal.

Table key
Indicates Bosnia and Herzegovina won the match
Indicates the match ended in a draw
Indicates Bosnia and Herzegovina lost the match

International goals by date, venue, cap, opponent, score, result and competition
No.	Date	Venue	Cap	Opponent	Score	Result	Competition
1	2 June 2007	Asim Ferhatović Hase Stadium, Sarajevo, Bosnia and Herzegovina	1	Turkey	2–2	3–2	UEFA Euro 2008 qualifying
2	10 September 2008	Bilino Polje Stadium, Zenica, Bosnia and Herzegovina	10	Estonia	5–0	7–0	2010 FIFA World Cup qualification
3	10 September 2008	Bilino Polje Stadium, Zenica, Bosnia and Herzegovina	10	Estonia	6–0	7–0	2010 FIFA World Cup qualification
4	11 October 2008	BJK İnönü Stadium, Istanbul, Turkey	11	Turkey	1–0	1–2	2010 FIFA World Cup qualification
5	15 October 2008	Bilino Polje Stadium, Zenica, Bosnia and Herzegovina	12	Armenia	2–0	4–1	2010 FIFA World Cup qualification
6	20 November 2008	Ljudski vrt, Maribor, Slovenia	13	Slovenia	3–1	4–3	Friendly
7	28 March 2009	Cristal Stadium, Genk, Belgium	14	Belgium	1–0	4–2	2010 FIFA World Cup qualification
8	1 April 2009	Bilino Polje Stadium, Zenica, Bosnia and Herzegovina	15	Belgium	1–0	2–1	2010 FIFA World Cup qualification
9	1 April 2009	Bilino Polje Stadium, Zenica, Bosnia and Herzegovina	15	Belgium	2–0	2–1	2010 FIFA World Cup qualification
10	9 June 2009	Stade Pierre de Coubertin, Cannes, France	16	Oman	1–0	2–1	Friendly
11	12 August 2009	Asim Ferhatović Hase Stadium, Sarajevo, Bosnia and Herzegovina	17	Iran	1–0	2–3	Friendly
12	12 August 2009	Asim Ferhatović Hase Stadium, Sarajevo, Bosnia and Herzegovina	17	Iran	2–0	2–3	Friendly
13	10 October 2009	A. Le Coq Arena, Tallinn, Estonia	20	Estonia	1–0	2–0	2010 FIFA World Cup qualification
14	14 October 2009	Bilino Polje Stadium, Zenica, Bosnia and Herzegovina	21	Spain	1–5	2–5	2010 FIFA World Cup qualification
15	3 June 2010	Commerzbank-Arena, Frankfurt, Germany	26	Germany	1–0	1–3	Friendly
16	3 September 2010	Stade Josy Barthel, Luxembourg City, Luxembourg	28	Luxembourg	3–0	3–0	UEFA Euro 2012 qualifying
17	17 November 2010	Štadión Pasienky, Bratislava, Slovakia	31	Slovakia	3–1	3–2	Friendly
18	26 March 2011	Bilino Polje Stadium, Zenica, Bosnia and Herzegovina	32	Romania	2–1	2–1	UEFA Euro 2012 qualifying
19	7 October 2011	Bilino Polje Stadium, Zenica, Bosnia and Herzegovina	38	Luxembourg	1–0	5–0	UEFA Euro 2012 qualifying
20	11 October 2011	Stade de France, Saint-Denis, France	38	France	1–0	1–1	UEFA Euro 2012 qualifying
21	1 June 2012	Soldier Field, Chicago, United States	44	Mexico	1–1	1–2	Friendly
22	7 September 2012	Rheinpark Stadion, Vaduz, Liechtenstein	46	Liechtenstein	5–0	8–1	2014 FIFA World Cup qualification
23	7 September 2012	Rheinpark Stadion, Vaduz, Liechtenstein	46	Liechtenstein	6–1	8–1	2014 FIFA World Cup qualification
24	7 September 2012	Rheinpark Stadion, Vaduz, Liechtenstein	46	Liechtenstein	7–1	8–1	2014 FIFA World Cup qualification
25	11 September 2012	Bilino Polje Stadium, Zenica, Bosnia and Herzegovina	47	Latvia	4–1	4–1	2014 FIFA World Cup qualification
26	16 October 2012	Bilino Polje Stadium, Zenica, Bosnia and Herzegovina	49	Lithuania	3–0	3–0	2014 FIFA World Cup qualification
27	22 March 2013	Bilino Polje Stadium, Zenica, Bosnia and Herzegovina	52	Greece	1–0	3–1	2014 FIFA World Cup qualification
28	22 March 2013	Bilino Polje Stadium, Zenica, Bosnia and Herzegovina	52	Greece	3–0	3–1	2014 FIFA World Cup qualification
29	7 June 2013	Skonto Stadium, Riga, Latvia	53	Latvia	5–0	5–0	2014 FIFA World Cup qualification
30	14 August 2013	Asim Ferhatović Hase Stadium, Sarajevo, Bosnia and Herzegovina	54	United States	1–0	3–4	Friendly
31	14 August 2013	Asim Ferhatović Hase Stadium, Sarajevo, Bosnia and Herzegovina	54	United States	3–4	3–4	Friendly
32	11 October 2013	Bilino Polje Stadium, Zenica, Bosnia and Herzegovina	57	Liechtenstein	1–0	4–1	2014 FIFA World Cup qualification
33	11 October 2013	Bilino Polje Stadium, Zenica, Bosnia and Herzegovina	57	Liechtenstein	4–0	4–1	2014 FIFA World Cup qualification
34	30 May 2014	Edward Jones Dome, St. Louis, United States	61	Ivory Coast	1–0	2–1	Friendly
35	30 May 2014	Edward Jones Dome, St. Louis, United States	61	Ivory Coast	2–0	2–1	Friendly
36	25 June 2014	Arena Fonte Nova, Salvador, Brazil	65	Iran	1–0	3–1	2014 FIFA World Cup
37	4 September 2014	Tušanj City Stadium, Tuzla, Bosnia and Herzegovina	66	Liechtenstein	3–0	3–0	Friendly
38	13 October 2014	Bilino Polje Stadium, Zenica, Bosnia and Herzegovina	69	Belgium	1–0	1–1	UEFA Euro 2016 qualifying
39	28 March 2015	Estadi Nacional, Andorra la Vella, Andorra	70	Andorra	1–0	3–0	UEFA Euro 2016 qualifying
40	28 March 2015	Estadi Nacional, Andorra la Vella, Andorra	70	Andorra	2–0	3–0	UEFA Euro 2016 qualifying
41	28 March 2015	Estadi Nacional, Andorra la Vella, Andorra	70	Andorra	3–0	3–0	UEFA Euro 2016 qualifying
42	12 June 2015	Bilino Polje Stadium, Zenica, Bosnia and Herzegovina	72	Israel	2–1	3–1	UEFA Euro 2016 qualifying
43	3 September 2015	King Baudouin Stadium, Brussels, Belgium	73	Belgium	1–0	1–3	UEFA Euro 2016 qualifying
44	6 September 2015	Bilino Polje Stadium, Zenica, Bosnia and Herzegovina	74	Andorra	2–0	3–0	UEFA Euro 2016 qualifying
45	13 November 2015	Bilino Polje Stadium, Zenica, Bosnia and Herzegovina	75	Republic of Ireland	1–1	1–1	UEFA Euro 2016 qualifying
46	29 March 2016	Letzigrund, Zurich, Switzerland	78	Switzerland	1–0	2–0	Friendly
47	6 September 2016	Bilino Polje Stadium, Zenica, Bosnia and Herzegovina	80	Estonia	2–0	5–0	2018 FIFA World Cup qualification
48	10 October 2016	Bilino Polje Stadium, Zenica, Bosnia and Herzegovina	82	Cyprus	1–0	2–0	2018 FIFA World Cup qualification
49	10 October 2016	Bilino Polje Stadium, Zenica, Bosnia and Herzegovina	82	Cyprus	2–0	2–0	2018 FIFA World Cup qualification
50	28 March 2017	Elbasan Arena, Elbasan, Albania	84	Albania	1–0	2–1	Friendly
51	3 September 2017	Estádio Algarve, Faro, Portugal	87	Gibraltar	1–0	4–0	2018 FIFA World Cup qualification
52	3 September 2017	Estádio Algarve, Faro, Portugal	87	Gibraltar	4–0	4–0	2018 FIFA World Cup qualification
53	11 September 2018	Bilino Polje Stadium, Zenica, Bosnia and Herzegovina	95	Austria	1–0	1–0	2018–19 UEFA Nations League B
54	15 October 2018	Stadion Grbavica, Sarajevo, Bosnia and Herzegovina	97	Northern Ireland	1–0	2–0	2018–19 UEFA Nations League B
55	15 October 2018	Stadion Grbavica, Sarajevo, Bosnia and Herzegovina	97	Northern Ireland	2–0	2–0	2018–19 UEFA Nations League B
56	11 June 2019	Juventus Stadium, Turin, Italy	103	Italy	1–0	1–2	UEFA Euro 2020 qualifying
57	5 September 2019	Bilino Polje Stadium, Zenica, Bosnia and Herzegovina	104	Liechtenstein	3–0	5–0	UEFA Euro 2020 qualifying
58	8 September 2019	Vazgen Sargsyan Republican Stadium, Yerevan, Armenia	105	Armenia	1–1	2–4	UEFA Euro 2020 qualifying
59	4 September 2020	Stadio Artemio Franchi, Florence, Italy	108	Italy	1–0	1–1	2020–21 UEFA Nations League A
60	1 September 2021	Stade de la Meinau, Strasbourg, France	115	France	1–0	1–1	2022 FIFA World Cup qualification
61	29 March 2022	Bilino Polje Stadium, Zenica, Bosnia and Herzegovina	120	Luxembourg	1–0	1–0	Friendly
62	14 June 2022	Bilino Polje Stadium, Zenica, Bosnia and Herzegovina	124	Finland	2–2	3–2	2022–23 UEFA Nations League B
63	14 June 2022	Bilino Polje Stadium, Zenica, Bosnia and Herzegovina	124	Finland	3–2	3–2	2022–23 UEFA Nations League B
64	26 September 2022	Stadionul Rapid-Giulești, Bucharest, Romania	126	Romania	1–2	1–4	2022–23 UEFA Nations League B
65	8 September 2023	Bilino Polje Stadium, Zenica, Bosnia and Herzegovina	130	Liechtenstein	1–0	2–1	UEFA Euro 2024 qualifying
66	7 September 2024	Philips Stadion, Eindhoven, Netherlands	135	Netherlands	2–3	2–5	2024–25 UEFA Nations League A
67	11 October 2024	Bilino Polje Stadium, Zenica, Bosnia and Herzegovina	137	Germany	1–2	1–2	2024–25 UEFA Nations League A
68	7 June 2025	Bilino Polje Stadium, Zenica, Bosnia and Herzegovina	141	San Marino	1–0	1–0	2026 FIFA World Cup qualification
69	6 September 2025	San Marino Stadium, Serravalle, San Marino	142	San Marino	2–0	6–0	2026 FIFA World Cup qualification
70	6 September 2025	San Marino Stadium, Serravalle, San Marino	142	San Marino	3–0	6–0	2026 FIFA World Cup qualification
71	9 September 2025	Bilino Polje Stadium, Zenica, Bosnia and Herzegovina	143	Austria	1–1	1–2	2026 FIFA World Cup qualification
72	15 November 2025	Bilino Polje Stadium, Zenica, Bosnia and Herzegovina	145	Romania	1–1	3–1	2026 FIFA World Cup qualification
73	26 March 2026	Cardiff City Stadium, Cardiff, Wales	147	Wales	1–1	1–1 (a.e.t.) (4–2 p)	2026 FIFA World Cup qualification

== Hat-tricks ==
No.	Date	Venue	Opponent	Goals	Result	Competition	Ref.
1	7 September 2012	Rheinpark Stadion, Vaduz, Liechtenstein	Liechtenstein	3 – (46', 64', 80')	8–1	2014 FIFA World Cup qualification	
2	28 March 2015	Estadi Nacional, Andorra la Vella, Andorra	Andorra	3 – (13', 49', 62')	3–0	UEFA Euro 2016 qualifying	

== Statistics ==
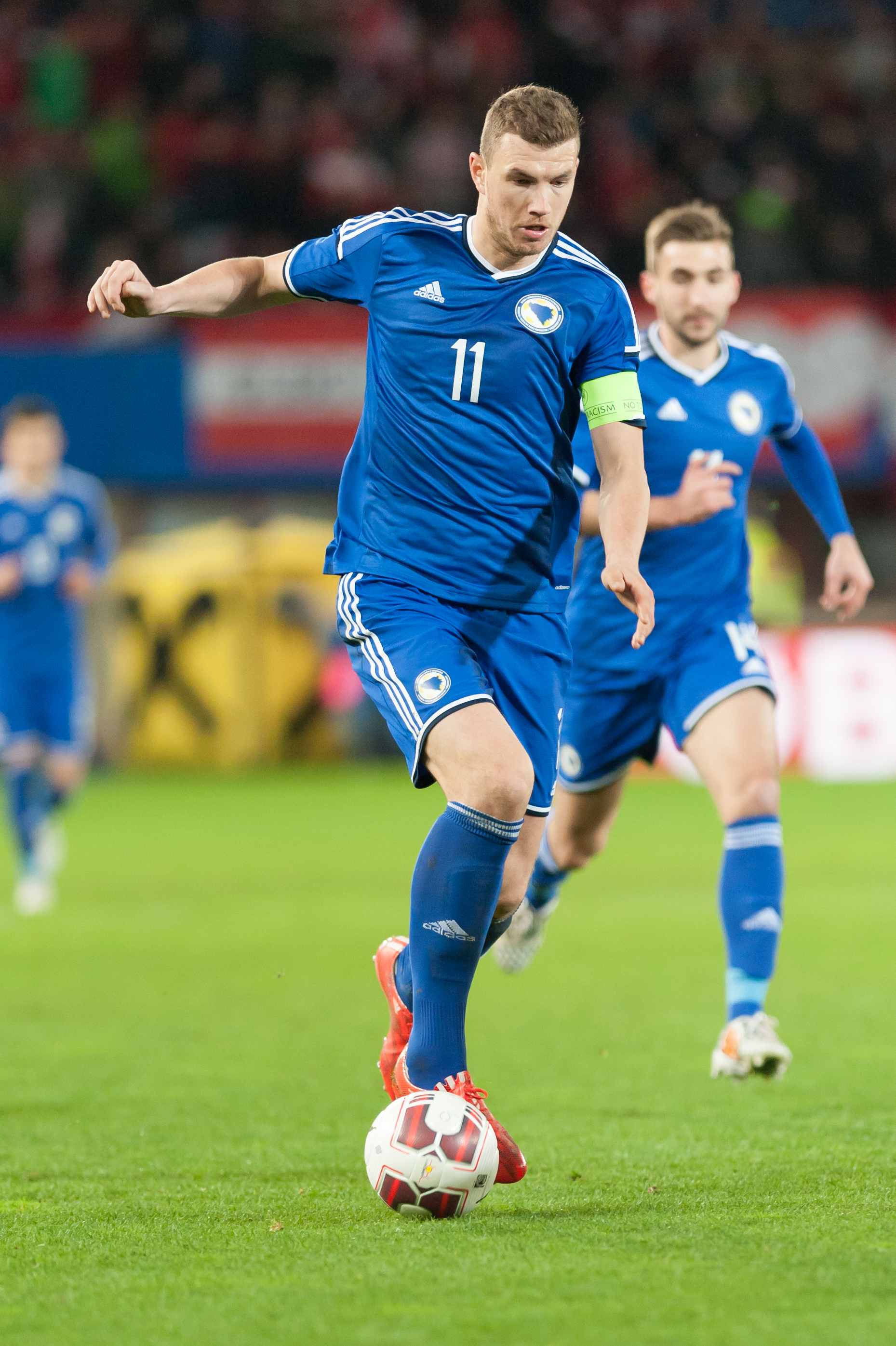
Džeko playing in a friendly against Austria in 2015

Appearances and goals by year
Year	Apps	Goals
2007	7	1
2008	6	5
2009	10	8
2010	8	3
2011	10	3
2012	9	6
2013	9	7
2014	10	5
2015	7	7
2016	7	4
2017	6	3
2018	10	3
2019	8	3
2020	5	1
2021	6	1
2022	8	4
2023	7	1
2024	6	2
2025	7	5
2026	6	1
Total	152	73

Goals by competition
Competition	Goals
FIFA World Cup qualification	31
FIFA World Cup finals	1
Friendlies	15
UEFA European Championship qualification	17
UEFA Nations League	9
Total	73

Goals by opponent
Opponent	Goals
Liechtenstein	8
Belgium	5
Andorra	4
Estonia	4
Iran	3
Luxembourg	3
San Marino	3
Armenia	2
Austria	2
Cyprus	2
Finland	2
France	2
Germany	2
Gibraltar	2
Greece	2
Italy	2
Ivory Coast	2
Latvia	2
Northern Ireland	2
Romania	2
Turkey	2
United States	2
Albania	1
Israel	1
Lithuania	1
Mexico	1
Netherlands	1
Oman	1
Republic of Ireland	1
Slovenia	1
Spain	1
Switzerland	1
Wales	1
Total	73

== See also ==
- List of top international men's football goalscorers by country
- List of men's footballers with 100 or more international caps
- List of men's footballers with 50 or more international goals
