= Bosnia and Herzegovina national football team records and statistics =

This page lists national football team statistics regarding Bosnia 1992 – present, and also some statistics from Yugoslavia 1920–1990 period relevant to SRBiH.

== Player records ==
=== All scorers Bosnia national football team ===
Table correct as of 28 September 2026.

Players still active for the national team are highlighted

**All scorers Bosnia national football team**
Rank	Player	Goals
1	Edin Džeko	73 (details)
2	Vedad Ibišević	28
2	Zvjezdan Misimović	25
4	Elvir Bolić	22
5	Sergej Barbarez	17
5	Miralem Pjanić	17
7	Elvir Baljić	14
8	Zlatan Muslimović	11
9	Edin Višća	10
10	Haris Medunjanin	9
11	Milan Đurić	7
12	Dželaludin Muharemović	6
12	Izet Hajrović	6
12	Smail Prevljak	6
12	Hasan Salihamidžić	6
12	Emir Spahić	6
17	Haris Tabaković	5
18	Rade Krunić	4
18	Amer Gojak	4
18	Mirsad Bešlija	4
18	Ermedin Demirović	4
18	Senijad Ibričić	4
18	Sejad Salihović	4
18	Senad Lulić	4
25	Asim Hrnjić	3
25	Ermin Mahmić	3
25	Meho Kodro	3
25	Armin Hodžić	3
25	Luka Menalo	3
25	Almedin Hota	3
25	Mirko Hrgović	3
25	Miroslav Stevanović	3
25	Zlatan Bajramović	3
25	Muhamed Konjić	3
25	Ermin Bičakčić	3
36	Muamer Svraka	2
36	Sanjin Pintul	2
36	Kenan Kodro	2
36	Kerim Alajbegović	2
36	Ivica Grlić	2
36	Haris Hajradinović	2
36	Dario Damjanović	2
36	Avdija Vršajević	2
36	Tarik Muharemović	2
36	Nikola Katić	2
36	Marko Topić	2
36	Armin Gigović	2
36	Benjamin Tahirović	2
49	Miroslav Dujmović	1
49	Almin Kulenović	1
49	Stevo Nikolić	1
49	Muhamed Subašić	1
49	Marijo Dodik	1
49	Zehrudin Kavazović	1
49	Vedran Pelić	1
49	Renato Gojković	1
49	Jovo Lukić	1
49	Adnan Čustović	1
49	Ramiz Husić	1
49	Enes Mešanović	1
49	Velimir Brašnić	1
49	Dario Đumić	1
49	Nail Omerović	1
49	Džemo Smječanin	1
49	Senad Brkić	1
49	Jasmin Hurić	1
49	Sead Seferović	1
49	Amar Rahmanović	1
49	Faruk Ihtijarević	1
49	Ermin Zec	1
49	Nihad Mujakić	1
49	Deni Milošević	1
49	Samed Baždar	1
49	Amar Memić	1
49	Admir Adžem	1
49	Bruno Akrapović	1
49	Senad Repuh	1
49	Esmir Bajraktarević	1
49	Darko Maletić	1
49	Elvis Sarić	1
49	Omer Joldić	1
49	Sanel Jahić	1
49	Edin Mujčin	1
49	Anel Ahmedhodžić	1
49	Amar Dedić	1
49	Haris Duljević	1
49	Eldar Ćivić	1
49	Nermin Šabić	1
49	Toni Šunjić	1
49	Own goals	9
All Total	Bosnia and Herzegovina	406

=== All appearances for Bosnia national football team ===
Table correct as of 28 September 2026

Players in bold are still active with Bosnia and Herzegovina.

All appearances for Bosnia national football team
Rank	Player	Position	Caps	Goals	Date of debut	Debut against	Date of last match	Last match against	Ref
1	**Edin Džeko**	FW	151	73	2007 June 2	Turkey	2026 July 1	United States	
2	Miralem Pjanić	MF	115	17	2008 August 20	Bulgaria	2024 March 21	Ukraine	
3	Emir Spahić	DF	94	6	2003 June 7	Romania	2018 May 28	Montenegro	
4	Zvjezdan Misimović	MF	84	25	2004 February 18	North Macedonia	2018 May 28	Montenegro	
5	Vedad Ibišević	FW	83	28	2007 March 24	Norway	2018 May 28	Montenegro	
6	**Sead Kolašinac**	DF	71		2013 November 18	Argentina	2026 September 28	Romania	
7	Asmir Begović	GK	63		2009 October 10	Estonia	2020 September 7	Poland	
8	Haris Medunjanin	MF	60	9	2009 November 18	Portugal	2018 March 27	Senegal	
9	Senad Lulić	MF	57	4	2008 June 1	Azerbaijan	2017 October 7	Belgium	
10	Edin Višća	MF	55	10	2010 December 10	Poland	2020 November 15	Netherlands	
10	Ibrahim Šehić	GK	55		2010 November 17	Slovakia	2024 March 21	Ukraine	
12	Elvir Bolić	FW	51	22	1996 September 1	Greece	2006 September 6	Hungary	
13	Gojko Cimirot	MF	48		2014 September 4	Liechtenstein	2024 March 21	Ukraine	
14	Sergej Barbarez	FW	47	17	1998 May 14	Argentina	2006 October 7	Moldova	
14	Sejad Salihović	MF	47	4	2007 October 13	Greece	2015 October 13	Cyprus	
14	Muhamed Bešić	MF	47		2010 November 17	Slovakia	2022 September 23	Montenegro	
17	**Ermedin Demirović**	FW	46	4	2021 March 24	Finland	2026 September 28	Romania	
18	Vedin Musić	DF	45		1995 November 30	Albania	2007 June 6	Malta	
19	Senijad Ibričić	MF	43	4	2005 February 2	Iran	2014 June 3	Mexico	
19	Ermin Bičakčić	DF	43	3	2013 August 14	United States	2025 June 7	San Marino	
19	Kenan Hasagić	GK	43		2003 February 12	Wales	2011 October 11	France	
22	Hasan Salihamidžić	MF	42	6	1996 October 8	Croatia	2006 August 16	France	
23	Toni Šunjić	DF	41	1	2012 August 15	Wales	2020 September 4	Italy	
24	Elvir Rahimić	MF	40		2007 June 2	Turkey	2013 August 14	United States	
25	Muhamed Konjić	DF	39	3	1995 November 30	Albania	2006 August 16	France	
25	Saša Papac	DF	39		2001 January 12	Bangladesh	2012 February 28	Brazil	
27	Elvir Baljić	FW	38	14	1996 April 24	Albania	2005 March 30	Lithuania	
27	Nermin Šabić	MF	38	1	1996 April 24	Albania	2008 August 20	Bulgaria	
27	Ognjen Vranješ	DF	38		2010 November 17	Slovakia	2018 November 15	Austria	
27	Ervin Zukanović	DF	38		2012 October 16	Lithuania	2019 September 8	Armenia	
31	Mirsad Bešlija	MF	37	4	2001 January 12	Bangladesh	2006 September 6	Hungary	
31	**Amir Hadžiahmetović**	MF	37		2020 September 4	Italy	2026 June 18	Switzerland	
31	Mensur Mujdža	DF	37		2010 August 10	Qatar	2015 November 13	Republic of Ireland	
34	Mirsad Hibić	DF	36		1996 April 24	Albania	2004 April 28	Finland	
35	Amer Gojak	MF	35	4	2018 November 15	Austria	2022 September 26	Romania	
35	Zlatan Bajramović	MF	35	3	2002 March 27	North Macedonia	2009 November 18	Portugal	
37	Rade Krunić	MF	34	4	2016 June 3	Denmark	2024 September 7	Netherlands	
37	**Benjamin Tahirović**	MF	33	2	2023 March 23	Iceland	2026 September 28	Romania	
39	Miroslav Stevanović	MF	33	3	2012 May 26	Republic of Ireland	2023 November 16	Luxembourg	
39	Džemal Berberović	DF	33		2003 February 12	Wales	2010 June 3	Germany	
39	**Dennis Hadžikadunić**	DF	33		2020 October 11	Netherlands	2026 June 24	Qatar	
42	**Amar Dedić**	DF	31	1	2022 March 29	Luxembourg	2026 July 1	United States	
43	Zlatan Muslimović	FW	30	11	2006 August 16	France	2011 September 2	Belarus	
43	Safet Nadarević	DF	30		2001 June 23	Bahrain	2010 September 7	France	
43	**Nikola Vasilj**	GK	30		2021 March 27	Costa Rica	2026 July 1	United States	
46	Mirko Hrgović	MF	29	3	2003 February 12	Wales	2009 October 14	Spain	
47	Haris Duljević	MF	28	1	2016 March 25	Luxembourg	2022 September 26	Romania	
47	Eldar Ćivić	DF	28	1	2018 June 1	South Korea	2024 March 21	Ukraine	
49	Izet Hajrović	MF	27	6	2013 September 6	Slovakia	2019 November 18	Liechtenstein	
49	Smail Prevljak	FW	27	6	2018 March 23	Bulgaria	2023 November 19	Slovakia	
49	Mirsad Dedić	GK	27		1996 November 6	Italy	2000 January 24	Qatar	

Not included unofficial matches: BiH-Uruguay, BiH-Chile, BiH-Slovakia, BiH-Malaysia U23, BiH-South Africa

=== All Bosnian scorers at Major Competitions (Bosnia 1992 – present) ===
Tournament	Round	Score	Result	Goalscorers
2014 FIFA World Cup	Round 1	Bosnia and Herzegovina **1 – 2** Argentina	Loss	Ibišević
2014 FIFA World Cup	Round 1	Bosnia and Herzegovina **0 – 1** Nigeria	Loss	—
2014 FIFA World Cup	Round 1	Bosnia and Herzegovina **3 – 1** Iran	Win	Džeko, Pjanić, Vršajević
2026 FIFA World Cup	Round 1	Canada **1 – 1** Bosnia and Herzegovina	Draw	Lukić
2026 FIFA World Cup	Round 1	Bosnia and Herzegovina **1 – 4** Switzerland	Loss	Mahmić
2026 FIFA World Cup	Round 1	Bosnia and Herzegovina **3 – 1** Qatar	Win	Alajbegović, Abunada (o.g.), Mahmić
2026 FIFA World Cup	Round 2	United States **2 – 0** Bosnia and Herzegovina	Loss	—

=== Bosnian players at Major Competitions (Yugoslavia 1920–1990) ===
Bosnian-Herzegovinian players who represented Yugoslavia at Major Competitions (1920–1990)
Competition	Players	Coaches
(Belgium) 1920 Summer Olympics	None	-
(France) 1924 Summer Olympics	None	-
(Netherlands) 1928 Summer Olympics	None	-
(Uruguay) 1930 FIFA World Cup	None	-
(United Kingdom) 1948 Summer Olympics	Miroslav Brozović, Branko Stanković	-
(Brazil) 1950 FIFA World Cup	Predrag Đajić, Branko Stanković	-
(Finland) 1952 Summer Olympics	Branko Stanković	-
(Switzerland) 1954 FIFA World Cup	Branko Stanković, Lev Mantula	-
(Australia) 1956 Summer Olympics	Kruno Radiljević, Ibrahim Biogradlić, Muhamed Mujić	-
(Sweden) 1958 FIFA World Cup	None	-
(France) 1960 UEFA Euro	Milan Galić, Tomislav Knez, Muhamed Mujić	-
(Italy) 1960 Summer Olympics	Milan Galić, Tomislav Knez, Velimir Sombolac	-
(Chile) 1962 FIFA World Cup	Vlatko Marković, Andrija Anković, Milan Galić, Muhamed Mujić, Nikola Stipić	-
(Japan) 1964 Summer Olympics	Ivan Ćurković, Mirsad Fazlagić, Svetozar Vujović, Ivica Osim	-
(Italy) 1968 UEFA Euro	Mirsad Fazlagić, Ivica Osim, Vahidin Musemić, Boško Antić, Idriz Hošić	-
(West Germany) 1974 FIFA World Cup	Enver Marić, Enver Hadžiabdić, Josip Katalinski, Franjo Vladić, Dušan Bajević, Rizah Mešković	-
(Socialist Federal Republic of Yugoslavia) 1976 UEFA Euro	Džemal Hadžiabdić, Josip Katalinski, Enver Marić, Vahid Halilhodžić, Edhem Šljivo, Franjo Vladić	-
(Soviet Union) 1980 Summer Olympics	Boro Primorac, Srebrenko Repčić, Miloš Šestić, Zoran Vujović, Zlatko Vujović, Dževad Šećerbegović, Vladimir Matijević	-
(Spain) 1982 FIFA World Cup	Edhem Šljivo, Zoran Vujović, Zlatko Vujović, Safet Sušić, Miloš Šestić, Vahid Halilhodžić, Predrag Pašić	-
(France) 1984 UEFA Euro	Mirsad Baljić, Miloš Šestić, Safet Sušić, Mehmed Baždarević, Zlatko Vujović, Faruk Hadžibegić, Sulejman Halilović	-
(United States) 1984 Summer Olympics	Mehmed Baždarević, Vlado Čapljić, Mirsad Baljić, Admir Smajić	-
(South Korea) 1988 Summer Olympics	Semir Tuce, Cvijan Milošević, Davor Jozić, Refik Šabanadžović	Ivica Osim, Džemaludin Mušović
(Italy) 1990 FIFA World Cup	Faruk Hadžibegić, Davor Jozić, Safet Sušić, Zlatko Vujović, Fahrudin Omerović, Refik Šabanadžović, Mirsad Baljić	Ivica Osim, Džemaludin Mušović

=== 2+ BiH players playing at the same club ===
The table below lists notable instances of two or more Bosnian football team players in one foreign based club at the same time:

#	Player names	Club	Season(s) together
4	Faruk Hujdurović; Bruno Akrapović; Tomislav Piplica; Marko Topić	(Germany) FC Energie Cottbus	2000–01; 2001–02
3	Ervin Zukanović; Miralem Pjanić; Edin Džeko	(Italy) A.S. Roma	2015–16
3	Amir Hadžiahmetović; Ibrahim Šehić; Deni Milošević	(Turkey) Konyaspor	2019–20
3	Eldar Ćivić; Adnan Kovačević; Stjepan Lončar	(Hungary) Ferencvárosi	2021–22
2	Edin Džeko; Nikola Katić	(Germany) FC Schalke 04	2025–26
2	Toni Šunjić; Vedad Ibišević	(Germany) VfB Stuttgart	2015 only
2	Sejad Salihović; Zvjezdan Misimović	(China) Beijing Renhe F.C.	2015; 2016
2	Zlatan Muslimović; Zvjezdan Misimović	(China) Guizhou Renhe F.C.	2013; 2014
2	Emir Spahić; Miroslav Stevanović	(Spain) Sevilla FC	2012–13
2	Sejad Salihović; Vedad Ibišević	(Germany) 1899 Hoffenheim	2009–10; 2010–11; 2011–12
2	Zvjezdan Misimović; Edin Džeko	(Germany) VfL Wolfsburg	2008–09
2	Zvjezdan Misimović; Hasan Salihamidžić	(Germany) FC Bayern Munich	2002–03

Note: Table contains some of the more prominent club sides of the world. Table does not yet contain clubs from other former Yugoslavia republics.

=== Youngest players on debut ===
As of 28 September 2026.
Players in bold are still active with Bosnia and Herzegovina.

Rank	Player	Date of birth	First match	Opponent	Result	Competition	Age	Apps	Pos.
1	Adnan Smajlović	27 March 1983	15 March 2000	Jordan	1–2	Friendly match	16 years, 11 months, 16 days	1	FW
2	Haris Handžić	20 June 1990	1 June 2008	Azerbaijan	1–0	Friendly match	17 years, 11 months, 12 days	1	FW
3	**Kerim Alajbegović**	21 September 2007	6 September 2025	San Marino	6–0	2026 FIFA World Cup qualifiers	17 years, 11 months, 16 days	16	MF
4	Muhamed Bešić	10 September 1992	17 November 2010	Slovakia	3–2	Friendly match	18 years, 2 months, 7 days	47	MF
5	**Eman Košpo**	17 May 2007	6 September 2025	San Marino	6–0	2026 FIFA World Cup qualifiers	18 years, 3 months, 20 days	1	DF
6	Miralem Pjanić	2 April 1990	20 August 2008	Bulgaria	1–2	Friendly match	18 years, 4 months, 18 days	115	MF
7	Senijad Ibričić	26 September 1985	2 February 2005	Iran	1–2	Friendly match	19 years, 4 months, 7 days	43	MF
8	**Esmir Bajraktarević**	10 March 2005	7 September 2024	Netherlands	2–5	2024–25 UEFA Nations League A	19 years, 5 months, 28 days	22	MF
9	**Arjan Malić**	28 August 2005	21 March 2025	Romania	1–0	2026 FIFA World Cup qualifiers	19 years, 6 months, 22 days	9	DF
10	Petar Jelić	18 October 1986	26 May 2006	South Korea	0–2	Friendly match	19 years, 7 months, 8 days	2	FW

== Match statistics ==
=== Biggest wins ===
Wins by five goals and up

Rank	Date	Venue	Opponent	Round	Result	Difference
1	7 September 2012	Rheinpark Stadion (Liechtenstein)	Liechtenstein	(Brazil) 2014 FIFA World Cup qualifier	1–8	+7
2	10 September 2008	Bilino Polje (Bosnia and Herzegovina)	Estonia	(South Africa) 2010 FIFA World Cup qualifier	7–0	+7
3	5 September 2019	Zenica (Bosnia and Herzegovina)	Liechtenstein	(Europe) UEFA Euro 2020 qualifier	5–0	+5
3	25 March 2017	Zenica (Bosnia and Herzegovina)	Gibraltar	(Russia) 2018 FIFA World Cup qualifier	5–0	+5
3	6 September 2016	Zenica (Bosnia and Herzegovina)	Estonia	(Russia) 2018 FIFA World Cup qualifier	5–0	+5
3	7 June 2013	Riga (Latvia)	Latvia	(Brazil) 2014 FIFA World Cup qualifier	0–5	+5
3	7 October 2011	Bilino Polje (Bosnia and Herzegovina)	Luxembourg	(Poland) (Ukraine) UEFA Euro 2012 qualifier	5–0	+5
3	7 October 2001	Bilino Polje (Bosnia and Herzegovina)	Liechtenstein	(South Korea) (Japan) 2002 FIFA World Cup qualifier	5–0	+5

=== Centuriate goals ===
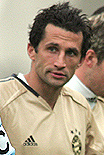
Hasan Salihamidžić scored Bosnia and Herzegovina's first goal in October 1996.

As of 28 September 2026, Bosnia and Herzegovina have scored 406 goals.

Goal#	Date	Scorer	Opponent	Score
1st	8 October 1996	Hasan Salihamidžić	Croatia	1–4
100th	4 June 2005	Hasan Salihamidžić	San Marino	3–1
200th	29 February 2012	Vedad Ibišević	Brazil	1–2
300th	3 September 2017	Edin Džeko	Gibraltar	4–0
400th	24 June 2026	Kerim Alajbegović	Qatar	3–1

=== Hat-tricks for Bosnia ===
The table below shows a list of Bosnia and Herzegovina players who scored three or more goals in one match.

Player	Goals	Result	Opponent	Competition	Date
Elvir Baljić	4	4–1	Estonia	UEFA Euro 2000 qualifiers	9 October 1999
Elvir Bolić	3	3–0	San Marino	2006 FIFA World Cup qualifiers	8 October 2005
Zlatan Muslimović	3	3–5	Croatia	Friendly	22 August 2007
Zvjezdan Misimović	3	7–0	Estonia	2010 FIFA World Cup qualifiers	10 September 2008
Vedad Ibišević	3	8–1	Liechtenstein	2014 FIFA World Cup qualifiers	7 September 2012
Edin Džeko	3	8–1	Liechtenstein	2014 FIFA World Cup qualifiers	7 September 2012
Edin Džeko	3	3–0	Andorra	UEFA Euro 2016 qualifiers	28 March 2015
Edin Višća	3	3–1	South Korea	Friendly	1 June 2018

=== Hat-tricks conceded by Bosnia ===
The table below shows a list of opponent players who scored three or more goals in one match against Bosnia and Herzegovina.

Player	Goals	Result	National team	Competition	Date
Gabriel Batistuta	3	5–0	Argentina	Friendly	14 May 1998
Valdas Ivanauskas	3	4–2	Lithuania	UEFA Euro 2000 qualifiers	14 October 1998
Artim Šakiri	3	4–4	Macedonia	Friendly	27 March 2002
Jozy Altidore	3	4–3	United States	Friendly	14 August 2013

=== Notable victories ===
Source: Results

- Unofficial games not included.

Date	Tournament	Place	Opponents	Score	Additional Notes
15 October 2013	2014 FIFA World Cup qualification	Kaunas, Lithuania	Lithuania	1–0	Qualified to 2014 FIFA World Cup
25 June 2014	2014 FIFA World Cup Group Stage	Salvador, Brazil	Iran	3–1	Historic first victory in FIFA World Cup
31 March 2026	2026 FIFA World Cup qualification	Zenica, Bosnia and Herzegovina	Italy	1–1 (Note: Victory following penalties.)	Qualified to 2026 FIFA World Cup
24 June 2026	2026 FIFA World Cup	Seattle, United States	Qatar	3–1	Advanced to FIFA World Cup knockout stage.

==== Other Victories of note ====
Date	Tournament	Place	Opponents	Score	Additional Notes
6 November 1996	Friendly	Sarajevo, Bosnia and Herzegovina	Italy	2–1	Victory over top 5 ranked team at the time (5th)
10 November 1996	1998 FIFA World Cup qualification	Ljubljana, Slovenia	Slovenia	2–1	Historic first victory in World Cup qualifiers
20 August 1997	1998 FIFA World Cup qualification	Sarajevo, Bosnia and Herzegovina	Denmark	3–0	Victory over top 5 ranked team at the time (3rd)
19 August 1998	UEFA Euro 2000 qualifying	Sarajevo, Bosnia and Herzegovina	Faroe Islands	1–0	Historic first victory in UEFA Euro qualifiers
2 June 2007	UEFA Euro 2008 qualifying	Sarajevo, Bosnia and Herzegovina	Turkey	3–2	Edin Džeko's debut senior cap and first international goal
10 September 2008	2010 FIFA World Cup qualification	Zenica, Bosnia and Herzegovina	Estonia	7–0	Largest ever victory (without conceding)
28 March 2009	2010 FIFA World Cup qualification	Genk, Belgium	Belgium	4–2	Game in which Edin Džeko is nicknamed Bosanski dijamant by TV commentator.
7 September 2012	2014 FIFA World Cup qualification	Vaduz, Lichtenstein	Liechtenstein	8–1	Largest ever victory
7 June 2016	2016 Kirin Cup	Osaka, Japan	Japan	2–1	Victory in the 2016 Kirin Cup Final

Note: In its history Bosnia and Herzegovina national football team has beaten teams ranked high in FIFA standings; Italy 5th (1996), Denmark 3rd (1997), Greece 12th (2013), Wales 8th (2015), Switzerland 12th (2016), Italy 12th (2026).

=== Major Tournaments appearances and play-offs appearances ===
Nation	Confederation	International Tournament (s)	Qualifying Play-off (s)	FIFA Active
Bosnia and Herzegovina	UEFA	2014 FIFA World Cup Group stage 2026 FIFA World Cup Round of 32	Pld: 6 Won: 1 Lost: 5; 2010 FIFA World Cup – play-offs UEFA Euro 2012 – play-offs UEFA Euro 2016 – play-offs UEFA Euro 2020 – play-offs UEFA Euro 2024 – play-offs 2026 FIFA World Cup – play-offs	(since 1996)

- Bosnia and Herzegovina was the first former Yugoslav nation to qualify for a FIFA World Cup directly, and not via play-offs first;
- Tino-Sven Sušić played for Bosnia at 2014 FIFA World Cup under his uncle - head coach Safet Sušić.

=== Play-offs win–draw–loss stats ===
Sorted in chronological order.

Opponent	Matches	Wins	Draws	Losses
Portugal (2x)	4	0	1	3
Republic of Ireland	2	0	1	1
Northern Ireland	1	0	0	1(PSO)
Ukraine	1	0	0	1
Wales	1	1(PSO)	0	0
Italy	1	1(PSO)	0	0

=== Major Tournament win–draw–loss stats ===
Opponent	Tournament(s)	Matches	Wins	Draws	Losses
Argentina	2014 FIFA World Cup	1	0	0	1
Nigeria	2014 FIFA World Cup	1	0	0	1
Iran	2014 FIFA World Cup	1	1	0	0
Canada	2026 FIFA World Cup	1	0	1	0
Switzerland	2026 FIFA World Cup	1	0	0	1
Qatar	2026 FIFA World Cup	1	1	0	0
United States	2026 FIFA World Cup	1	0	0	1

== Head-to-head record ==
Tables correct as of match played on 2 October 2026.

Bosnia and Herzegovina's all-time international record, 1995–present
Opponent	Games	Wins	Draws	Losses	Goals for	Goals against	Goal differential	First games	Last games	Biggest win	Biggest loss
Albania	5	2	2	1	5	4	+1	30 Nov 1995	28 Mar 2017	2–0	0–2
Algeria	1	1	0	0	1	0	+1	14 Nov 2012	14 Nov 2012	1–0	x
Andorra	2	2	0	0	6	0	+6	28 Mar 2015	06 Sep 2015	3–0	x
Argentina	3	0	0	3	1	9	−8	14 May 1998	15 Jun 2014	x	0–5
Armenia	4	3	0	1	10	6	+4	15 Oct 2008	08 Sep 2019	4–1	2–4
Austria	7	1	4	2	5	7	−2	24 Mar 2001	9 September 2025	1–0	0–2
Azerbaijan	1	1	0	0	1	0	+1	01 Jun 2008	01 Jun 2008	1–0	x
Bahrain	1	1	0	0	1	0	+1	23 Jun 2001	23 Jun 2001	1–0	x
Bangladesh	1	1	0	0	2	0	+2	12 Jan 2001	12 Jan 2001	2–0	x
Belarus	2	2	0	0	3	0	+3	02 Sep 2011	06 Sep 2011	2–0	x
Belgium	8	3	1	4	13	19	−6	26 Mar 2005	07 Oct 2017	4–2	0–4
Brazil	2	0	0	2	1	3	−2	18 Dec 1996	28 Feb 2012	x	1–2
Bulgaria	2	1	0	1	2	2	0	20 Aug 2008	23 Mar 2018	1–0	1–2
Canada	1	0	1	0	1	1	0	12 Jun 2026	12 Jun 2026	x	x
Chile	1	1	0	0	1	0	+1	22 Jan 2001	22 Jan 2001	1–0	x
China	1	0	0	1	0	3	−3	02 Mar 1997	02 Mar 1997	x	0–3
Costa Rica	1	0	1	0	0	0	0	27 Mar 2021	27 Mar 2021	x	x
Croatia	4	0	0	4	6	14	−8	08 Oct 1996	22 Aug 2007	x	1–4
Czech Republic	2	0	0	2	1	6	−5	10 Oct 1998	08 Sep 1999	x	0–3
Cyprus	6	3	1	2	12	10	+2	09 Sep 2014	9 October 2025	2–0	2–3
Denmark	6	2	2	2	8	7	+1	08 Jun 1997	06 Jun 2021	3–0	0–2
Egypt	1	0	0	1	0	2	−2	05 Mar 2014	05 Mar 2014	x	0–2
England	1	0	0	0	0	1	–1	04 Jun 2024	04 Jun 2024	x	0–3
Estonia	7	5	1	1	21	4	+17	05 Sep 1998	10 Oct 2017	7–0	0–1
Faroe Islands	2	1	1	0	3	2	+1	19 Aug 1998	09 Jun 1999	1–0	x
Finland	7	3	2	2	12	11	+1	28 Apr 2004	14 Jun 2022	4–1	1–3
France	6	0	3	3	4	8	−4	18 Aug 2004	01 Sep 2021	x	0–2
Georgia	1	0	0	1	0	1	−1	25 Mar 2022	25 Mar 2022	x	0–1
Germany	4	0	1	3	3	13	−10	11 Oct 2002	16 Nov 2024	x	0–7
Ghana	1	1	0	0	2	1	+1	03 Mar 2010	03 Mar 2010	2–1	x
Gibraltar	2	2	0	0	9	0	+9	25 Mar 2017	03 Sep 2017	5–0	x
Greece	11	1	5	5	9	17	−8	01 Sep 1996	15 Oct 2019	3–1	0–4
Hungary	6	0	3	3	3	8	−5	10 Mar 1999	14 Oct 2024	x	1–3
Iceland	2	1	0	1	4	2	+2	23 Mar 2023	11 Sep 2023	3–0	1–2
Indonesia	1	1	0	0	2	0	+2	26 Feb 1997	26 Feb 1997	2–0	x
Iran	7	1	1	5	10	19	−9	22 Jul 2001	12 Nov 2020	3–1	0–4
Israel	4	1	1	2	4	7	−3	11 Oct 2000	12 Jun 2015	3–1	0–3
Italy	7	1	2	4	5	11	–6	06 Nov 1996	31 Mar 2026	2–1	0–3
Ivory Coast	1	1	0	0	2	1	+1	30 May 2014	30 May 2014	2–1	x
Japan	3	1	1	1	4	6	−2	28 Feb 2006	07 Jun 2016	2–1	0–3
Jordan	2	1	1	0	2	1	+1	11 Mar 2000	15 Mar 2000	2–1	x
Kazakhstan	2	1	1	0	4	2	+2	07 Sep 2021	09 Oct 2021	2–0	x
Kuwait	1	1	0	0	1	0	+1	04 Sep 2021	04 Sep 2021	1–0	x
Latvia	2	2	0	0	9	1	+8	11 Sep 2012	07 Jun 2013	5–0	x
Liechtenstein	10	9	1	0	35	3	+32	18 Aug 1999	13 Oct 2023	8–1	x
Lithuania	6	4	1	1	10	5	+5	14 Oct 1998.	16 Oct 2013.	3–0	2–4
Luxembourg	9	7	0	2	18	7	+11	29 Mar 2003	16 Nov 2023	5–0	1–4
Malaysia	3	2	1	0	5	2	+3	28 Feb 1997	27 Jun 2001	2–0	x
Malta	5	4	0	1	13	5	+8	27 Jan 1999	12 Oct 2025	5–2	1–2
Mexico	4	1	0	3	2	5	−3	09 Feb 2011	01 Feb 2018	1–0	0–2
Moldova	2	0	1	1	2	3	−1	07 Oct 2006	12 Sep 2007	x	0–1
Montenegro	4	1	3	0	2	1	+1	28 May 2018	23 Sep 2022	1–0	x
Netherlands	4	0	2	2	4	9	–5	11 Oct 2020	19 Nov 2024	x	2–5
Nigeria	1	0	0	1	0	1	−1	21 Jun 2014	21 Jun 2014	x	0–1
North Macedonia	6	1	4	1	8	8	0	03 Jun 1998	29 May 2026	1–0	0–1
Northern Ireland	3	2	1	0	5	2	+3	08 Sep 2018	08 Oct 2020	2–0	x
Norway	4	2	0	2	3	5	−2	16 Oct 2002	17 Oct 2007	2–1	0–2
Oman	1	1	0	0	2	1	+1	09 Jun 2009	09 Jun 2009	2–1	x
Panama	1	0	1	0	1	1	0	06 Jun 2026	06 Jun 2026	x	x
Paraguay	1	0	0	1	0	3	−3	21 Apr 1996	21 Apr 1996	x	0–3
Poland	5	0	2	3	3	8	−5	10 Dec 2010	25 Sep 2026	x	0–3
Portugal	6	0	1	5	2	16	−14	14 Nov 2009	16 Oct 2023	x	2–6
Qatar	3	1	1	1	4	4	0	24 Jan 2000	24 Jun 2026	3–1	0–2
Republic of Ireland	3	0	1	2	1	4	−3	26 May 2012	16 Nov 2015	x	0–2
Romania	9	5	0	4	12	16	−4	07 Sep 2002	28 Sep 2026	4–2	1–4
San Marino	4	4	0	0	13	1	+12	04 Jun 2005	6 Sept 2025	3–0	x
Scotland	2	0	0	2	1	3	−2	04 Sep 1999	05 Oct 1999	x	0–1
Senegal	1	0	1	0	0	0	0	27 Mar 2018	27 Mar 2018	x	x
Serbia and Montenegro	5	0	2	3	1	6	−5	14 Jan 2001	12 Oct 2005	x	0–2
Slovakia	6	3	0	3	7	8	–1	20 Jun 2001	19 Nov 2023	3–2	0–2
Slovenia	5	4	0	1	11	6	+5	10 Nov 1996	10 June 2025	3–0	x
South Africa	1	1	0	0	4	2	+2	08 Aug 2001	08 Aug 2001	4–2	x
South Korea	2	1	0	1	3	3	0	26 May 2006	01 Jun 2018	3–1	0–2
Spain	8	0	2	6	7	18	−11	02 Sep 2000	18 Nov 2018	x	2–5
Sweden	2	0	1	1	3	5	−2	29 May 2010	2 Oct 2026	x	2–4
Switzerland	2	1	0	1	3	4	–1	29 Mar 2016	18 Jun 2026	2–0	1–4
Tunisia	1	0	0	1	1	2	−1	05 Nov 1997	05 Nov 1997	x	1–2
Turkey	6	2	2	2	7	6	+1	16 Aug 2000	11 Oct 2018	2–0	0–1
Ukraine	3	0	1	2	2	5	–3	12 Oct 2021	21 Mar 2024	x	0–2
United States	4	0	1	3	3	7	−4	14 Aug 2013	1 Jul 2026	x	3–4
Uruguay	1	1	0	0	3	2	+1	18 Jan 2001	18 Jan 2001	3–2	x
Uzbekistan	2	0	1	1	1	2	−1	30 Jun 2001	01 Jun 2009	x	1–2
Vietnam	1	1	0	0	4	0	+4	22 Feb 1997	22 Feb 1997	4–0	x
Wales	5	2	3	0	7	3	+4	12 Feb 2003	10 Oct 2015	2–0	x
Zimbabwe	1	0	1	0	2	2	0	24 Feb 1997	24 Feb 1997	x	x
85 countries	288	106	69	113	399	396	+3	30 Nov 1995	2 Oct 2026	8–1	0–7

The table lists opponents played, sorted by members of FIFA affiliated confederations.

Bosnia and Herzegovina's all-time record sorted by FIFA Confederations, 1995–present

Opponent	Games	Wins	Draws	Losses	Goals For	Goals Against	Goals Differential	First games	Last games
UEFA	234	88	56	91	337	320	+17	30 Nov 1995	2 Oct 2026
AFC	31	14	7	10	45	43	+2	22 Feb 1997	24 Jun 2026
CAF	9	4	2	3	12	11	+1	05 Nov 1997	27 Mar 2018
CONMEBOL	7	2	0	5	6	14	−8	14 May 1998	15 Jun 2014
CONCACAF	11	1	4	6	7	14	−7	09 Feb 2011	1 Jul 2026
OFC	0	0	0	0	0	0	0	x	x
84 Countries	292	109	70	113	408	401	+7	30 Nov 1995	2 Oct 2026

=== Matches vs Ex-Yugoslav Republics ===
Bosnia and Herzegovina was one of six republics of Socialist Federal Republic of Yugoslavia. As such, meeting one of its neighbor republics on the sports pitch is of great significance.

Opponent	Matches	Won	Draw	Loss
Active
Serbia	0	0	0	0
Croatia	4	0	0	4
Slovenia	4	4	0	0
Montenegro	4	1	3	0
Macedonia	5	1	3	1
Kosovo	No right to play (Note: Bosnia and Herzegovina has no right to play against Kosovo for security reasons.)			
Defunct
FR Yugoslavia/ Serbia and Montenegro	5	0	2	3

=== Penalty shootout record ===
Team	Match score (PSO score)	Event	Venue
Denmark	2–2 (4–3)	Kirin Cup Soccer 2016	(Japan) Toyota Stadium, Aichi, 3 June 2016
Northern Ireland	1–1 (3–4)	UEFA Euro 2020 qualifying play-offs	(Bosnia and Herzegovina) Grbavica Stadium, 8 October 2020
Wales	1–1 (4–2)	2026 FIFA World Cup qualifying play-offs	(Wales) Cardiff City Stadium, Cardiff, 26 March 2026
Italy	1–1 (4–1)	2026 FIFA World Cup qualifying play-offs	(Bosnia and Herzegovina) Bilino Polje Stadium, Zenica, 31 March 2026

== Managers and captains ==
=== Captains ===
Emir Spahić captained Bosnia at their first ever FIFA World Cup tournament. This is a list of Bosnia and Herzegovina captains for ten or more matches.

Note: Some of the other players to have captained the team include: Mehmed Baždarević (2 caps) 1996, Meho Kodro (5) 1997 to 1998, Vlatko Glavaš (1) 1997, Suvad Katana (2) 1998, Elvir Bolić (6) 1999 to 2000, Bruno Akrapović (4) 1999 to 2003, Hasan Salihamidžić (1) 2004, Zlatan Bajramović (1) 2006, Džemal Berberović (1) 2007, Asmir Begović (6) 2011 to 2020, Haris Medunjanin (4) 2016 to 2018, Vedad Ibišević (1) 2017, Miralem Pjanić (6) 2019 to 2021, Ermin Bičakčić (1) 2019, Sead Kolašinac (1) 2021, Ibrahim Šehić (1) 2021, Siniša Saničanin (1) 2021, Eldar Ćivić (1) 2021, Adnan Kovačević (1) 2021, Ajdin Nukić (1) 2021.

Name	Period	Games as captain	Notes
Muhamed Konjić	1995–2002	20	First official captain of the Bosnia and Herzegovina national football team
Mirsad Hibić	2000–2003	14	
Sergej Barbarez	2004–2006	20	
Zvjezdan Misimović	2007–2012	16	
Emir Spahić	2006–2014	55	First official captain of the team in a major tournament (2014 FIFA World Cup)
Edin Džeko	2014–	50	

Table correct as of prior match played in March 2022.

=== Notable national team managers born in Bosnia and Herzegovina ===
Table correct as of 1 May 2026.
List ONLY includes managers of senior national teams originating from Bosnia who have worked overseas and/or who have had national team success.
Does not include managers of junior sides. Also the list does not include assistant to national coach managers.

Manager	Residence	National Teams managed	Managerial Tenure	Achievements
Zlatko Dalić	Croatia	Croatia	2017 – present	2018 FIFA World Cup – Runner-up; UEFA Euro 2020 – Round of 16; 2022 FIFA World Cup – Third place; UEFA Euro 2024 – Group stage; 2026 FIFA World Cup – Qualified
Savo Milošević*	Serbia	Bosnia and Herzegovina	2023 – 2024	Play-offs for UEFA Euro 2024
Mladen Krstajić**	Serbia	Serbia	2017 – 2019	2018 FIFA World Cup – Group stage
Vladimir Petković	Switzerland	Switzerland	Jul 2014 – Jul 2021	UEFA Euro 2016 – Round of 16; 2018 FIFA World Cup – Round of 16; UEFA Euro 2020 – Quarter-finals
		Algeria	Feb 2024 – Present	2026 FIFA World Cup – Qualified
Safet Sušić	France	Bosnia and Herzegovina	Dec 2009 – Nov 2014	2014 FIFA World Cup – Group stage; Play-offs for UEFA Euro 2012
Mehmed Baždarević	France	Bosnia and Herzegovina	Dec 2014 – Oct 2017	Play-offs for UEFA Euro 2016
Miroslav Blažević***	Croatia	Croatia	1994–2000	UEFA Euro 1996 – Quarter-finals; 1998 FIFA World Cup – Third place
		Bosnia and Herzegovina	2008–2009	Play-offs for 2010 FIFA World Cup
		Iran	2001	Play-offs for 2002 FIFA World Cup
Vahid Halilhodžić	France	Japan	March 2015 – May 2018	Qualified for 2018 FIFA World Cup - fired before start of tournament
		Algeria	2011 – Jul 2014	2014 FIFA World Cup – Round of 16
		Ivory Coast	2008–2010	Qualified for 2010 FIFA World Cup - fired before start of tournament
		Morocco	Aug 2019 – Aug 2022	2022 FIFA World Cup – Qualified -fired before start of tournament
Ivica Osim	Bosnia	(Socialist Federal Republic of Yugoslavia) Yugoslavia	1986–1992	1990 FIFA World Cup – Quarter-finals
		Japan	2006–2007	2007 AFC Asian Cup – Semi-finals
Džemaludin Mušović	Bosnia	Qatar	1990 – 1995; 2004 – 2007	2007 AFC Asian Cup – Group stage
Senad Kreso	Bosnia	Bahrain	2007	18th Arabian Gulf Cup – Semi-finals

* Savo Milošević was born in Bijeljina.

** Mladen Krstajić was born in Zenica, took over an already qualified Serbia to 2018 FIFA World Cup from Slavoljub Muslin.

*** Miroslav Blažević was born in Travnik, Kingdom of Yugoslavia (present day Bosnia), but lived most of his life in Zagreb, Croatia. He is considered to be both Bosnian and/or Croatian manager having managed clubs from both nations, including their national teams.

== Home venues record ==
(Bosnia 1992 – present)
Table correct as of 29 May 2026.

Table of games played at home stadiums
Venue	City	GP	W	D	L	GD	Opponents
Stadium Asim Ferhatović Hase	Sarajevo	32	9	9	14	34:43	BiH-Italy 2:1, BiH-Greece 0:1, BiH-Denmark 3:0, BiH-Slovenia 1:0, BiH-Faroe Island 1:0, BiH-Estonia 1:1, BiH-Czech Republic 1:3, BiH-Lithuania 2:0, BiH-Scotland 1:2, BiH-Turkey 2:0, BiH-Spain 1:2, BiH-Austria 1:1, BiH-Israel 0:0, BiH-Serbia 0:2, BiH-Romania 0:3, BiH-Germany 1:1, BiH-Denmark 1:1, BiH-Serbia 0:0, BiH-Lithuania 1:1, BiH-France 1:2, BiH-Turkey 3:2, BiH-Malta 1:0, BiH-Croatia 3:5, BiH-Moldova 0:1, BiH-Norway 0:2, BiH-Iran 2:3, BiH-Ghana 2:1, BiH-France 0:2, BiH-Greece 0:0, BiH-USA 3:4, BiH-Iran 0:2, BiH-North Macedonia 0:0
Bilino Polje Stadium	Zenica	71	36	16	19	118:72	BiH-Albania 0:0, BiH-Macedonia 1:0, BiH-Hungary 1:1, BiH-Liechtenstein 5:0, BiH-Luxembourg 2:0, BiH-Norway 1:0, BiH-Finland 1:0, BiH-Spain 1:1, BiH-Belgium 1:0, BiH-San Marino 3:0, BiH-Hungary 1:3, BiH-Greece 0:4, BiH-Macedonia 2:2, BiH-Azerbaijan 1:0, BiH-Bulgaria 1:2, BiH-Estonia 7:0, BiH-Armenia 4:1, BiH-Belgium 2:1, BiH-Turkey 1:1, BiH-Spain 2:5, BiH-Portugal 0:1, BiH-Romania 2:1, BiH-Albania 2:0, BiH-Belarus 1:0, BiH-Luxembourg 5:0, BiH-Portugal 0:0, BiH-Latvia 4:1, BiH-Lithuania 3:0, BiH-Greece 3:1, BiH-Slovakia 0:1, BiH-Liechtenstein 4:1, BiH-Cyprus 1:2, BiH-Belgium 1:1, BiH-Izrael 3:1, BiH-Andorra 3:0, BiH-Wales 2:0, BiH-Rep. of Ireland 1:1, BiH-Estonia 5:0, BiH-Cyprus 2:0, BiH-Gibraltar 5:0, BiH-Greece 0:0, BiH-Montenegro 0:0, BiH-Austria 1:0, BiH-Greece 2:2, BiH-Liechtenstein 5:0, BiH-Finland 4:1, BiH-Italy 0:3, BiH-Poland 0:2, BiH-Netherlands 0:0, BiH-Costa Rica 0:0, BiH-Kuwait 1:0, BiH-Kazakhstan 2:2, BiH-Finland 1:3, BiH-Ukraine 0:2, BiH-Georgia 0:1, BiH-Luxembourg 1:0, BiH-Romania 1:0, BiH-Finland 3:2, BiH-Montenegro 1:0, BiH-Iceland 3:0, BiH-Luxembourg 0:2, BiH-Liechtenstein 2:1, BiH-Portugal 0:5, BiH-Slovakia 1:2, BiH-Ukraine 1:2, BiH-Germany 1:2, BiH-Hungary 0:2, BiH-Netherlands 1:1, BiH-Cyprus 2:1, BiH-San Marino 1:0, BiH-Austria 1:2, BiH-Romania 3:1, BiH-Italy 1:1
Stadium Grbavica	Sarajevo	10	3	4	3	15:14	BiH-Malta 2:0, BiH-Macedonia 4:4, BiH-Qatar 1:1, BiH-Belgium 3:4, BiH-Northern Ireland 2:0, BiH-Armenia 2:1, BiH-Northern Ireland 1:1, BiH-Italy 0:2, BiH-France 0:1, BiH-Montenegro 0:0
Stadion pod Borićima	Bihać	1	0	1	0	2:2	BiH-Iran 2:2
Tušanj	Tuzla	1	1	0	0	3:0	BiH-Liechtenstein 3:0
Total		115	49	30	36	172:131	

== Notable match formations ==

Starting XI vs Argentina at the Maracanã, Rio de Janeiro on 15 June 2014.

Starting XI vs Lithuania in Kaunas on 15 October 2013.

Bosnia-Herzegovina's starting line-up against Iran, World Cup 2014

== FIFA World Rankings ==
=== BiH Ranking Evolution ===
From April 1996 – March 2014

=== Yearly averages ===
FIFA ranking yearly averages for Bosnia and Herzegovina:

1993	1994	1995	1996	1997	1998	1999	2000	2001	2002
x	x	x	152	99	96	75	78	69	87
2003	2004	2005	2006	2007	2008	2009	2010	2011	2012
59	79	65	59	51	61	51	44	20	27
2013	2014	2015	2016	2017	2018	2019	2020	2021	2022
19	29	22	27	37	34	49	55	61	57
2023
69

Bosnia and Herzegovina's average position since the FIFA World Ranking's creation is 64.

== Other records ==
- Bosnia and Herzegovina player sent off: (23 times)
  - Elvir Baljić - Lithuania, 14 October 1998 (70th minute)
  - Nihad Pejković - Malta, 27 January 1999 (65th minute)
  - Hasan Salihamidžić - Lithuania, 5 June 1999 (67th minute)
  - Hasan Salihamidžić - Israel, 11 October 2000 (89th minute)
  - Hasan Salihamidžić - Germany, 11 October 2002 (49th minute)
  - Nedim Halilovic - Spain, 5 June 2005 (87th minute)
  - Mirsad Bešlija - Spain, 5 June 2005 (95th minute)
  - Emir Spahić - Hungary, 6 September 2006 (38th minute)
  - Saša Papac - Greece, 11 October 2006 (50th minute)
  - Mirko Hrgović - Greece, 13 October 2007 (56th minute)
  - Mijo Studenovic - Poland, 15 December 2007 (60th minute)
  - Sejad Salihović - Portugal, 18 November 2009 (77th minute)
  - Senad Lulić - Portugal, 15 November 2011 (53rd minute)
  - Toni Šunjić - Israel, 16 November 2014 (47th minute)
  - Muhamed Bešić - Andorra, 6 September 2015 (63rd minute)
  - Emir Spahić - Spain, 29 May 2016 (45+1st minute)
  - Edin Džeko - Greece, 13 November 2016 (80th minute)
  - Almir Bekic - Mexico, 1 February 2018 (83rd minute)
  - Miralem Pjanić - Greece, 26 March 2019 (65th minute)
  - Anel Ahmedhodžić - Poland, 14 October 2020 (15th minute) (Fastest red cards)
  - Amar Dedić - United States, 18 December 2021 (40th minute)
  - Renato Gojković - Slovakia, 19 November 2023 (63rd minute)
  - Tarik Muharemović - Switzerland, 18 June 2026 (80th minute)
- Opponent player sent off: (20 times)
  - Darius Gvildys - Lithuania, 5 June 1999 (81st minute)
  - Christian Wörns - Germany, 11 October 2002 (49th minute)
  - Thomas Gravesen - Denmark, 11 October 2003 (90th minute)
  - Marius Stankevičius - Lithuania, 30 March 2005 (65th minute)
  - Axel Witsel - Belgium, 1 April 2009 (61st minute)
  - Andi Lila - Albania, 7 June 2011 (87th minute)
  - Timofei Kalachev - Belarus, 6 September 2011 (34th minute)
  - Aleksandr Martynovich - Belarus, 6 September 2011 (85th minute)
  - Aleksandrs Fertovs - Latvia, 7 June 2013 (10th minute) (Fastest red cards)
  - Víctor Rodríguez - Andorra, 6 September 2015 (63rd minute)
  - Kyriakos Papadopoulos - Greece, 13 November 2016 (78th minute)
  - Martin Raynov - Bulgaria, 23 March 2018 (87th minute)
  - Jules Koundé - France, 1 September 2021 (51st minute)
  - Jukka Raitala - Finland, 13 November 2021 (37th minute)
  - Ioannis Pittas - Cyprus, 24 March 2025 (90+5th minute)
  - Alessandro Golinucci - San Marino, 6 September 2025 (16th minute)
  - Patrick Wimmer - Austria, 9 September 2025 (90+5th minute)
  - Denis Drăguş - Romania, 15 November 2025 (68th minute)
  - Alessandro Bastoni - Italy, 31 March 2026 (41st minute)
  - Folarin Balogun - United States, 1 July 2026 (64th minute) (2026 Trump–FIFA red card controversy)
- Largest blown lead to lose the match: 2 goals - (4 times)
  - Iran, 31 May 2006
  - Iran, 12 August 2009
  - United States, 14 August 2013
  - Cyprus, 31 August 2017
- Most consecutive appearances: 41 matches played: Asmir Begović - from 29 February 2012 to 29 May 2016
- Highest scoring draw: 4-4 - North Macedonia, 27 March 2002
- Most goals in a match: 8 goals - Liechtenstein, 7 September 2012
- Most goals in first half: 4 goals - (2 times)
  - Luxembourg, 7 October 2011
  - Liechtenstein, 7 September 2012
- Most goals in second half: 5 goals - (3 times)
  - Estonia, 10 September 2008
  - Latvia, 7 June 2013
  - San Marino, 6 September 2025
- Most goals conceded in a match: 7 goals - Germany, 16 November 2024
- Most goals conceded in first half: 5 goals - Portugal, 16 October 2023
- Most goals conceded in second half: 4 goals - (5 times)
  - North Macedonia, 27 March 2002
  - Portugal, 15 November 2011
  - United States, 14 August 2013
  - Germany, 16 November 2024
  - Switzerland, 18 June 2026
- Most goals by both teams in a match: 9 goals - Liechtenstein, 7 September 2012
- Most goals by both teams in first half: 5 goals - (2 times)
  - Iran, 31 May 2006
  - Portugal, 16 October 2023
- Most goals by both teams in second half: 5 goals - (12 times)
  - North Macedonia, 27 March 2002
  - Croatia, 22 August 2007
  - Estonia, 10 September 2008
  - Belgium, 28 March 2009
  - Iran, 12 August 2009
  - Spain, 14 October 2009
  - Portugal, 15 November 2011
  - Liechtenstein, 7 September 2012
  - Latvia, 7 June 2013
  - United States, 14 August 2013
  - San Marino, 6 September 2025
  - Switzerland, 18 June 2026
- Fewest goals by both teams in a match: 0 goals - (20 times) - Last matches played: North Macedonia, 29 May 2026
- Longest goalless streak: 400 minutes - from 24 March 2021 to 1 September 2021
- Most consecutive minutes without conceding a goal: 561 minutes - from 3 June 2011 to 11 October 2011
- Longest goalless streak by both teams: 276 minutes - from 23 March 2018 to 1 June 2018
- Fastest goal: 50 seconds - Zlatan Bajramović - Belgium, 26 March 2005
- Fastest goal by a opponent: 78 seconds - Jamal Musiala - Germany, 16 November 2024
- Fastest 2 goals to start the match: 10 minutes - Malta, 2 September 2006
- Fastest 2 goals conceded to start the match: 8 minutes - Romania, 7 September 2002

== See also ==
- List of international goals scored by Edin Džeko
- The Bosnian footballer of the year award – Idol of the nation
