= 2000–01 FC Energie Cottbus season =

FC Energie Cottbus
2000–01 season
- Manager: Eduard Geyer
- Stadium: Stadion der Freundschaft
- Bundesliga: 14th
- DFB-Pokal: Second round
- Top goalscorer: League: Vasile Miriuță; All: Vasile Miriuță (11)
- Average home league attendance: 16,833

During the 2000–01 German football season, FC Energie Cottbus competed in the Bundesliga.

== Season summary ==
Cottbus finished 14th in the Bundesliga.

== First-team squad ==
Squad at end of season

Note: Flags indicate national team as defined under FIFA eligibility rules; some limited exceptions apply. Players may hold more than one non-FIFA nationality.

No.	Pos.	Nation	Player
1	GK	GER	Thomas Köhler
2	DF	HUN	Vilmos Sebők
3	DF	GER	Christian Beeck
4	MF	GER	Jörg Scherbe
5	DF	BUL	Tsanko Tsvetanov
7	MF	ROU	Laurențiu Reghecampf
8	MF	BIH	Bruno Akrapović
9	MF	MKD	Toni Micevski
10	MF	GER	Steffen Heidrich
11	FW	CRO	Antun Labak
13	MF	POL	Witold Wawrzyczek
14	DF	ALB	Rudi Vata
16	MF	BEN	Moussa Latoundji

No.	Pos.	Nation	Player
17	DF	HUN	János Mátyus
18	FW	POL	Andrzej Kobylański
19	MF	MAR	Hamid Termina
20	DF	GER	René Trehkopf
21	FW	BRA	Franklin Bittencourt
22	FW	MAR	Mohamed Lakhouil
23	GK	BIH	Tomislav Piplica
24	MF	HUN	Vasile Miriuță
25	DF	BIH	Faruk Hujdurović
30	MF	SWE	Jonny Rödlund
31	DF	CAN	Kevin McKenna
33	MF	GER	Ronny Thielemann
34	FW	GER	Sebastian Helbig

=== Left club during season ===
Note: Flags indicate national team as defined under FIFA eligibility rules; some limited exceptions apply. Players may hold more than one non-FIFA nationality.

No.	Pos.	Nation	Player
15	FW	HUN	Ferenc Horváth (to Maccabi Tel Aviv)
15	FW	ROU	Sabin Ilie (to Dinamo Bucharest)

No.	Pos.	Nation	Player
19	FW	GER	Toralf Konetzke (to St Pauli)
