= 2010 FIFA World Cup qualification – UEFA Group 5 =

Football tournament qualifying stage

The 2010 FIFA World Cup qualification UEFA Group 5 was a UEFA qualifying group for the 2010 FIFA World Cup. The group comprised European champions Spain, Turkey, Belgium, Bosnia and Herzegovina, Armenia and Estonia.

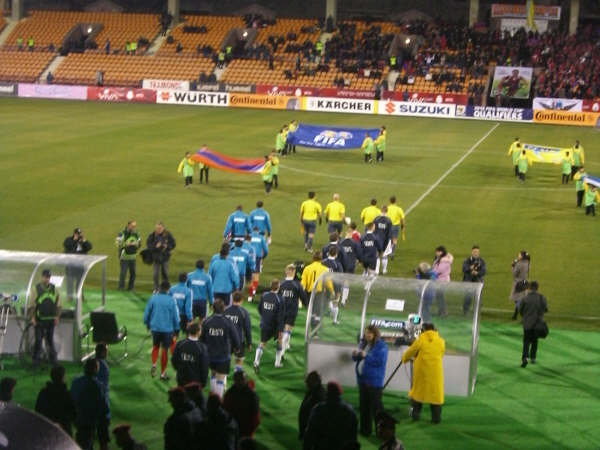
Armenia vs Estonia in Yerevan

The group was won by Spain, who qualified for the 2010 FIFA World Cup without dropping a single point in qualification. The runners-up Bosnia and Herzegovina entered the UEFA play-off stage.

== Standings ==
Pos	Team	Pld	W	D	L	GF	GA	GD	Pts	Qualification	(Spain)	(Bosnia and Herzegovina)	(Turkey)	(Belgium)	(Estonia)	(Armenia)
1	Spain	10	10	0	0	28	5	+23	30	Qualification to 2010 FIFA World Cup	—	1–0	1–0	5–0	3–0	4–0
2	Bosnia and Herzegovina	10	6	1	3	25	13	+12	19	Advance to second round	2–5	—	1–1	2–1	7–0	4–1
3	Turkey	10	4	3	3	13	10	+3	15		1–2	2–1	—	1–1	4–2	2–0
4	Belgium	10	3	1	6	13	20	−7	10		1–2	2–4	2–0	—	3–2	2–0
5	Estonia	10	2	2	6	9	24	−15	8		0–3	0–2	0–0	2–0	—	1–0
6	Armenia	10	1	1	8	6	22	−16	4		1–2	0–2	0–2	2–1	2–2	—

== Matches ==
A meeting was held in Barcelona, Spain on 8 January 2008 to determine the fixtures for Group 5. However, the Bosnian delegation arrived several hours late, and Spain and Turkey were unable to agree on scheduling. Since the fixtures were not finalised by 16 January 2008 deadline, FIFA conducted a random draw to determine the fixtures. The draw took place in Zagreb, Croatia at 16:00 CET on 30 January 2008, on the eve of the XXXII Ordinary UEFA Congress.

6 September 2008
21:00 UTC+5

Armenia	0–2	Turkey
	Report	Tuncay 61'; Semih 77'

Hrazdan Stadium, Yerevan
Attendance: 30,000
Referee: Tom Henning Øvrebø (Norway)
6 September 2008
20:45 UTC+2

Belgium	3–2	Estonia
Sonck 39', 81'; Defour 75'	Report	Zenjov 57'; Oper 90+2'

Stade Maurice Dufrasne, Liège
Attendance: 17,992
Referee: Mike Dean (England)
6 September 2008
22:00 UTC+2

Spain	1–0	Bosnia and Herzegovina
Villa 58'	Report

Estadio Nueva Condomina, Murcia
Attendance: 29,152
Referee: Craig Thomson (Scotland)

10 September 2008
21:00 UTC+3

Turkey	1–1	Belgium
Emre B. 74' (pen.)	Report	Sonck 32'

Şükrü Saracoğlu Stadium, Istanbul
Attendance: 34,097
Referee: Stéphane Lannoy (France)
10 September 2008
20:15 UTC+2

Bosnia and Herzegovina	7–0	Estonia
Misimović 24', 30' (pen.), 56'; Muslimović 59'; Džeko 60', 72'; Ibričić 88'	Report

Bilino Polje, Zenica
Attendance: 12,500
Referee: Cristian Balaj (Romania)
10 September 2008
22:00 UTC+2

Spain	4–0	Armenia
Capdevila 7'; Villa 16', 79'; Senna 83'	Report

Estadio Carlos Belmonte, Albacete
Attendance: 16,996
Referee: Tony Asumaa (Finland)

11 October 2008
21:00 UTC+3

Turkey	2–1	Bosnia and Herzegovina
Arda 51'; Mevlüt 66'	Report	Džeko 27'

BJK İnönü Stadium, Istanbul
Attendance: 23,628
Referee: Viktor Kassai (Hungary)
11 October 2008
20:45 UTC+2

Belgium	2–0	Armenia
Sonck 21'; Fellaini 37'	Report

King Baudouin Stadium, Brussels
Attendance: 20,949
Referee: Peter Rasmussen (Denmark)
11 October 2008
21:45 UTC+3

Estonia	0–3	Spain
	Report	Juanito 34'; Villa 38'; Puyol 69'

Lilleküla Stadium, Tallinn
Attendance: 9,200
Referee: Jonas Eriksson (Sweden)

15 October 2008
20:15 UTC+2

Bosnia and Herzegovina	4–1	Armenia
Spahić 31'; Džeko 39'; Muslimović 56', 89'	Report	Minasyan 85'

Bilino Polje, Zenica
Attendance: 13,000
Referee: Asaf Kenan (Israel)
15 October 2008
21:30 UTC+3

Estonia	0–0	Turkey
	Report

Lilleküla Stadium, Tallinn
Attendance: 6,500
Referee: Robert Małek (Poland)
15 October 2008
20:45 UTC+2

Belgium	1–2	Spain
Sonck 7'	Report	Iniesta 36'; Villa 88'

King Baudouin Stadium, Brussels
Attendance: 45,888
Referee: Tom Henning Øvrebø (Norway)

28 March 2009
20:00 UTC+4

Armenia	2–2	Estonia
Mkhitaryan 33'; Ghazaryan 87'	Report	Vassiljev 38'; Zenjov 67'

Hanrapetakan Stadium, Yerevan
Attendance: 3,000
Referee: Luc Wilmes (Luxembourg)
28 March 2009
20:45 UTC+1

Belgium	2–4	Bosnia and Herzegovina
Dembélé 66'; Sonck 85' (pen.)	Report	Džeko 7'; Jahić 75'; Bajramović 77'; Misimović 81'

Fenix Stadion, Genk
Attendance: 20,041
Referee: Nikolai Ivanov (Russia)
28 March 2009
22:00 UTC+1

Spain	1–0	Turkey
Piqué 60'	Report

Santiago Bernabéu, Madrid
Attendance: 73,820
Referee: Massimo Busacca (Switzerland)

1 April 2009
18:00 UTC+3

Estonia	1–0	Armenia
Puri 83'	Report

Lilleküla Stadium, Tallinn
Attendance: 5,200
Referee: Cyril Zimmermann (Switzerland)
1 April 2009
21:00 UTC+3

Turkey	1–2	Spain
Semih 26'	Report	Alonso 63' (pen.); Riera 90+2'

Ali Sami Yen Stadium, Istanbul
Attendance: 19,617
Referee: Mike Riley (England)
1 April 2009
20:45 UTC+2

Bosnia and Herzegovina	2–1	Belgium
Džeko 12', 14'	Report	Swerts 88'

Bilino Polje, Zenica
Attendance: 13,800
Referee: Vladimír Hriňák (Slovakia)

5 September 2009
20:00 UTC+5

Armenia	0–2	Bosnia and Herzegovina
	Report	Ibričić 6'; Muslimović 74'

Hanrapetakan Stadium, Yerevan
Attendance: 1,800
Referee: Eric Braamhaar (Netherlands)
5 September 2009
21:00 UTC+3

Turkey	4–2	Estonia
Tuncay 29', 72'; Sercan 37'; Arda 62'	Report	Voskoboinikov 7'; Vassiljev 52'

Kadir Has Stadium, Kayseri
Attendance: 28,569
Referee: Tommy Skjerven (Norway)
5 September 2009
22:00 UTC+2

Spain	5–0	Belgium
Silva 41', 67'; Villa 49', 85'; Piqué 50'	Report

Estadio Riazor, A Coruña
Attendance: 30,441
Referee: Bertrand Layec (France)

9 September 2009
21:00 UTC+5

Armenia	2–1	Belgium
Goharyan 23'; Hovsepyan 50'	Report	Van Buyten 90+2'

Hanrapetakan Stadium, Yerevan
Attendance: 2,300
Referee: Ljubomir Krstevski (Macedonia)
9 September 2009
20:00 UTC+2

Bosnia and Herzegovina	1–1	Turkey
Salihović 25'	Report	Emre B. 4'

Bilino Polje, Zenica
Attendance: 14,000
Referee: Olegário Benquerença (Portugal)
9 September 2009
22:00 UTC+2

Spain	3–0	Estonia
Fàbregas 33'; Cazorla 82'; Mata 90+2'	Report

Estadio Romano, Mérida
Attendance: 14,362
Referee: Oleh Oriekhov (Ukraine)

10 October 2009
21:00 UTC+5

Armenia	1–2	Spain
Arzumanyan 58'	Report	Fàbregas 33'; Mata 64' (pen.)

Hanrapetakan Stadium, Yerevan
Attendance: 10,500
Referee: Jiří Jech (Czech Republic)
10 October 2009
19:00 UTC+3

Estonia	0–2	Bosnia and Herzegovina
	Report	Džeko 30'; Ibišević 64'

Lilleküla Stadium, Tallinn
Attendance: 6,450
Referee: Nicola Rizzoli (Italy)
10 October 2009
20:45 UTC+2

Belgium	2–0	Turkey
Mpenza 8', 84'	Report

King Baudouin Stadium, Brussels
Attendance: 30,131
Referee: Matteo Trefoloni (Italy)

14 October 2009
20:00 UTC+2

Bosnia and Herzegovina	2–5	Spain
Džeko 90'; Misimović 90+2'	Report	Piqué 13'; Silva 14'; Negredo 50', 55'; Mata 81'

Bilino Polje, Zenica
Attendance: 13,500
Referee: Konrad Plautz (Austria)
14 October 2009
21:00 UTC+3

Turkey	2–0	Armenia
Halil Altıntop 16'; Servet 28'	Report

Bursa Atatürk Stadium, Bursa
Attendance: 16,200
Referee: Martin Hansson (Sweden)
14 October 2009
21:30 UTC+3

Estonia	2–0	Belgium
Piiroja 30'; Vassiljev 67'	Report

Lilleküla Stadium, Tallinn
Attendance: 4,680
Referee: Nicolai Vollquartz (Denmark)

== Goalscorers ==
There were 94 goals scored in 30 matches, for an average of 3.13 goals per match.

9 goals

- (Bosnia and Herzegovina) Edin Džeko

7 goals

- (Spain) David Villa

6 goals

- (Belgium) Wesley Sonck

5 goals

- (Bosnia and Herzegovina) Zvjezdan Misimović

4 goals

- (Bosnia and Herzegovina) Zlatan Muslimović

3 goals

- (Estonia) Konstantin Vassiljev
- (Spain) Juan Mata
- (Spain) Gerard Piqué
- (Spain) David Silva
- (Turkey) Tuncay

2 goals

- (Belgium) Emile Mpenza
- (Bosnia and Herzegovina) Senijad Ibričić
- (Estonia) Sergei Zenjov
- (Spain) Cesc Fàbregas
- (Spain) Álvaro Negredo
- (Turkey) Emre Belözoğlu
- (Turkey) Semih Şentürk
- (Turkey) Arda Turan

1 goal

- (Armenia) Robert Arzumanyan
- (Armenia) Gevorg Ghazaryan
- (Armenia) Hovhannes Goharyan
- (Armenia) Sargis Hovsepyan
- (Armenia) Vahagn Minasyan
- (Armenia) Henrikh Mkhitaryan
- (Belgium) Steven Defour
- (Belgium) Mousa Dembélé
- (Belgium) Marouane Fellaini
- (Belgium) Gill Swerts
- (Belgium) Daniel Van Buyten
- (Bosnia and Herzegovina) Zlatan Bajramović
- (Bosnia and Herzegovina) Vedad Ibišević
- (Bosnia and Herzegovina) Sanel Jahić
- (Bosnia and Herzegovina) Sejad Salihović
- (Bosnia and Herzegovina) Emir Spahić
- (Estonia) Andres Oper
- (Estonia) Raio Piiroja
- (Estonia) Sander Puri
- (Estonia) Vladimir Voskoboinikov
- (Spain) Xabi Alonso
- (Spain) Joan Capdevila
- (Spain) Santi Cazorla
- (Spain) Andrés Iniesta
- (Spain) Juanito
- (Spain) Carles Puyol
- (Spain) Albert Riera
- (Spain) Marcos Senna
- (Turkey) Halil Altıntop
- (Turkey) Servet Çetin
- (Turkey) Mevlüt Erdinç
- (Turkey) Sercan Yıldırım

== Attendances ==
Team	Highest	Lowest	Average
Armenia	30,000	1,800	9,520
Belgium	45,888	17,992	27,000
Bosnia and Herzegovina	15,000	12,500	13,360
Estonia	9,200	4,680	6,406
Spain	73,820	14,362	32,954
Turkey	34,097	16,200	24,422
