= Mijo Studenović =

Bosnia and Herzegovina footballer (born 1985)

Personal information
- Date of birth: 7 October 1985 (age 41)
- Place of birth: Odžak, SFR Yugoslavia
- Height: 1.86 m (6 ft 1 in)
- Position: Defender

Senior career*
Years	Team	Apps	(Gls)
2004–2005	Orašje	31	(2)
2006	Široki Brijeg	0	(0)
2006–2008	Cibalia	22	(1)
2008	Slavonac SP	8	(0)
2008-2009	Hrvatski Dragovoljac	12	(0)
2009-2010	Orašje		
2010	Suhopolje		
2011	MV Croatia		
2011	Rapperswil-Jona	7	(1)
2012	BV Brambauer	3	(0)
2013	SV Frannach	10	(0)
2013–2014	ATV Irdning	17	(1)
2014	SV Union Haus	11	(2)
2015–2016	ESV Freilassing	12	(1)
2016–2018	SSV Eggenfelden	20	(1)

International career
2007	Bosnia and Herzegovina XI	1	(0)
- * Club domestic league appearances and goals as of 3 February 2016

Mijo Studenović (born 7 October 1985) is a Bosnian-Herzegovinian professional football defender who plays in the German amateur leagues.

== Club career ==
Studenović previously played for HNK Cibalia in the Croatian Prva HNL. He also played for NK Široki Brijeg in the Bosnian Premier League.

He later played in the Austrian lower leagues.

== International career ==
Studenović made one appearance for an unofficial Bosnia and Herzegovina selection in 2007 against Poland.
