= Vedad Ibišević =

Bosnian footballer (born 1984)

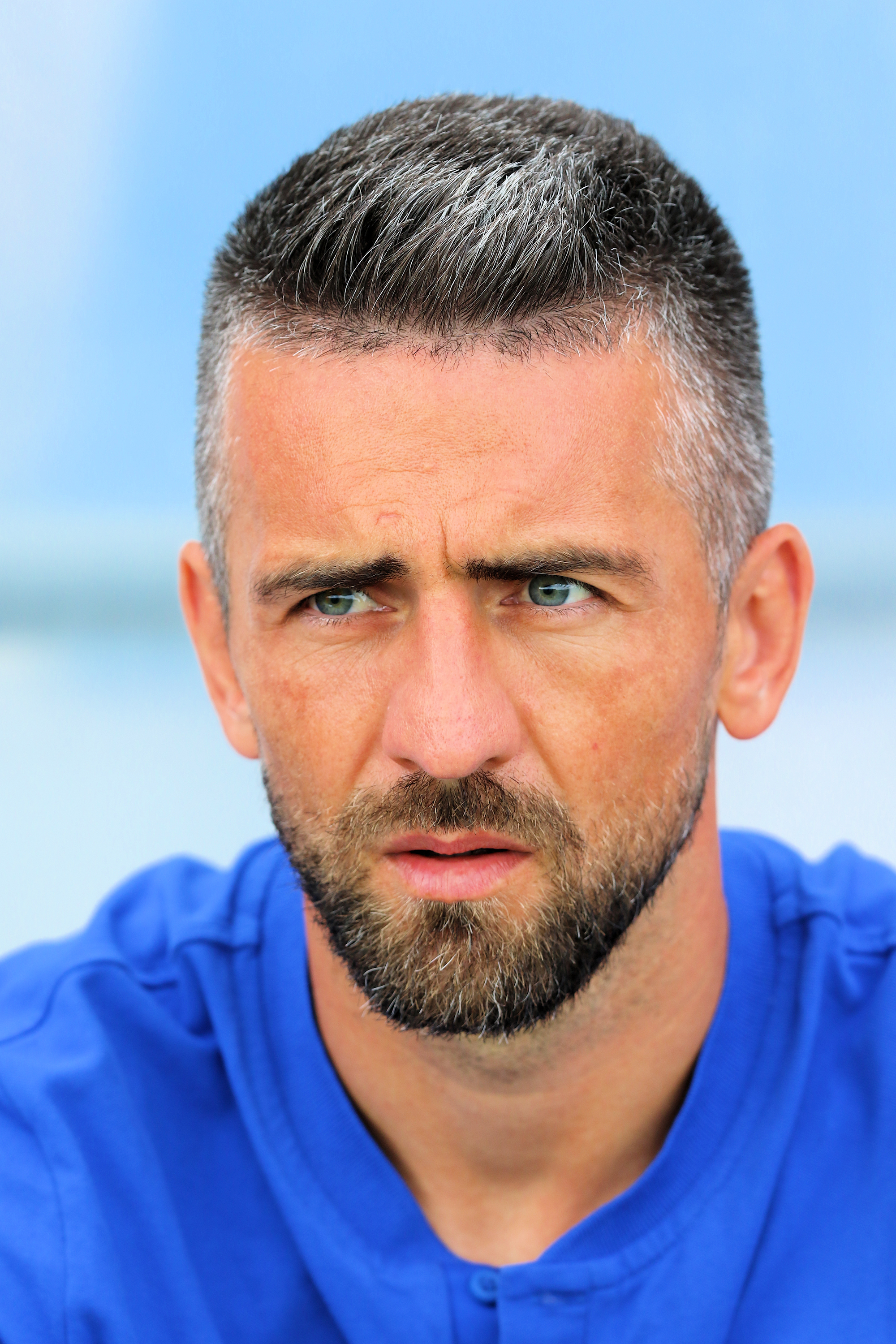
- Ibišević with Hertha BSC in 2019

Personal information
- Full name: Vedad Ibišević
- Date of birth: 6 August 1984 (age 42)
- Place of birth: Vlasenica, SR Bosnia and Herzegovina, SFR Yugoslavia
- Height: 1.88 m (6 ft 2 in)
- Position: Forward

Youth career
- 1992–1999: FK Zmaj od Bosne
- 2000–2001: FC Baden
- 2001–2002: Roosevelt High School

College career
Years	Team	Apps	(Gls)
2003	Saint Louis Billikens	22	(18)

Senior career*
Years	Team	Apps	(Gls)
2003–2004	St. Louis Strikers	10	(9)
2004	Chicago Fire Premier	3	(3)
2004–2006	Paris Saint-Germain	4	(0)
2005–2006	→ Dijon (loan)	33	(10)
2006–2007	Alemannia Aachen	24	(6)
2007–2012	1899 Hoffenheim	123	(48)
2012–2016	VfB Stuttgart	86	(33)
2015–2016	→ Hertha BSC (loan)	26	(10)
2016–2020	Hertha BSC	112	(35)
2020	Schalke 04	4	(0)
Total		425	(154)

International career
2004–2006	Bosnia and Herzegovina U21	5	(1)
2007–2018	Bosnia and Herzegovina	83	(28)

Managerial career
- 2022–2023: Hertha BSC (assistant)
- 2024–2025: New York Red Bulls (assistant)
- * Club domestic league appearances and goals

Vedad Ibišević (Bosnian pronunciation: [ʋědad ibîːʃeʋitɕ]; born 6 August 1984) is a Bosnian professional football coach and former player who played as a forward.

Ibišević started his professional career at Paris Saint-Germain. He had a two-year loan stint with Dijon, and afterwards went to Germany, where he played for Alemannia Aachen, 1899 Hoffenheim, VfB Stuttgart, before eventually settling in Hertha BSC and later Schalke 04. In 2008, he was awarded the Idol Nacije award for Bosnian Footballer of the Year.

A former youth international for Bosnia and Herzegovina, Ibišević made his senior international debut in 2007. He earned 83 caps and scored 28 goals until 2018. Ibišević scored a goal that took Bosnia and Herzegovina to the 2014 FIFA World Cup, the nation's first major tournament. He also scored their first ever goal at the tournament.

== Club career ==
=== Early career ===
Ibišević was born in Vlasenica, Bosnia and Herzegovina, then a republic within SFR Yugoslavia. At the start of the Yugoslav War he was a refugee in Tuzla where he and his family stayed until 2000 when they left Bosnia and Herzegovina to move to Switzerland, where Ibišević was signed by FC Baden in Canton Aargau. His family, however, left Switzerland after only ten months, moving to St. Louis, Missouri, in the United States. In St. Louis, Ibišević flourished as one of the region's most promising football players, and after his senior season in 2002, was named by Soccer America as one of the nation's top 25 recruits. He played his high school football at Roosevelt High School in St. Louis.

Ibišević signed to play college soccer in his adopted hometown at one of the nation's most respected football establishments, Saint Louis University. He quickly established himself in his freshman year, registering 18 goals and four assists in 22 games for the Billikens, while leading a strong SLU team deep into the NCAA Tournament. For his achievements, Ibišević was named the NCAA Freshman of the Year, as well as a first team All-American. During his college years, he also played in the Premier Development League with both the St. Louis Strikers and Chicago Fire Premier.

During training with the team, Ibišević was spotted by Paris Saint-Germain's Bosnian manager Vahid Halilhodžić, who quickly signed him to play for the renowned French team for the coming season. Ibišević, however, initially saw little action, and was loaned to French second division club Dijon.

=== 1899 Hoffenheim ===
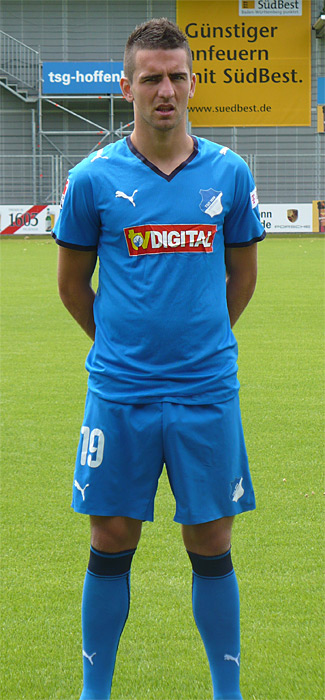
Ibišević with 1899 Hoffenheim in 2008

In May 2006, Ibišević signed a three-year deal with Alemannia Aachen, and on 12 July 2007, he moved to another German club, 1899 Hoffenheim. At the time, the club competed in 2. Bundesliga, where they got promoted in the previous season. At the end of Ibišević's first season, the club managed to get promoted once again, this time to Bundesliga for the first time in their history.

Ibišević kicked off the 2008–09 season in good fashion, scoring two goals in 1899 Hoffenheim's first ever appearance in Bundesliga against Energie Cottbus with the game ending in a 3–0 win. He scored another goal on his second game against Borussia Mönchengladbach, giving his team the victory. In his third Bundesliga match for the club, he scored his fourth goal of the season against Bayer Leverkusen, although his side lost 5–2. He scored another two goals in 4–1 win over Borussia Dortmund. He even scored a goal against Bayern Munich at the Allianz Arena in a 1–2 loss. During the first half of 1899 Hoffenheim's debut season in the top flight, Ibišević recorded 18 goals and seven assists in 17 games, making him the league's top scorer before he was injured. He was voted Bundesliga Player of the Month for October 2008.

On 14 January 2009, during the Bundesliga's winter break, Ibišević was injured in a training match against Hamburger SV in Spain. The final examination confirmed an anterior right cruciate ligament rupture, which took him out of action for the rest of the season.

Ibišević returned at the beginning of the 2009–10 season. He was scoreless until 1899 Hoffenheim's seventh Bundesliga match, when he scored a hat-trick against Hertha BSC in a remarkable comeback. This became the fifth-fastest hat-trick in Bundesliga history and the fastest goal scored that season, scored 44 seconds into the match. The only time when he again scored more than a single goal in that season was against Hamburger SV on 25 April 2010. After the season, he signed a contract extension that would have kept him at the club until June 2013.

His third season started with a goal and assist against Werder Bremen on 21 August 2010. Ibišević scored his only brace of the season in a 4–0 win over Eintracht Frankfurt.

Ibišević injured his thigh muscle in July 2011 and missed the opening seven games of the season.

=== VfB Stuttgart ===
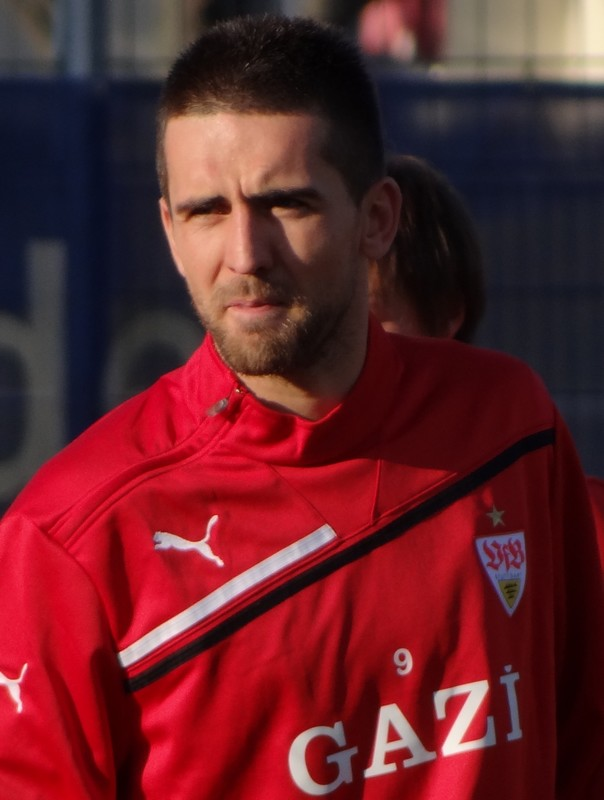
Ibišević with VfB Stuttgart in 2012

On 25 January 2012, Ibišević moved to VfB Stuttgart. He debuted for his new club just four days later against Borussia Mönchengladbach playing 90 minutes, and scored his first goal, the opening one, on 11 February 2012 in a 5–0 home victory against Hertha BSC. He also provided an assist in that match. Ibišević scored two more goals in a 2–1 derby victory over former club 1899 Hoffenheim on 16 March. His good form continued as he netted a brace in his side's emphatic 4–1 victory over Mainz 05, bringing Stuttgart ever closer to securing European competition for the next season.

Ibišević's first goal of the 2012–13 season came on 29 September 2012, scoring within the opening minute as VfB Stuttgart defeated 1. FC Nürnberg 2–0. On 8 December, Ibišević scored his first hat-trick for VfB Stuttgart, netting all three goals as the home side moved into fifth spot in the league with a 3–1 defeat of Schalke 04.

On 1 September 2013, Ibišević netted a hat-trick against former club Hoffenheim, powering his side to a 6–2 victory at the Mercedes-Benz Arena. He was given a five-match ban on 9 February for appearing to strike Jan-Ingwer Callsen-Bracker in a home defeat to FC Augsburg. The German Football Association's decision was reached as Ibišević was labelled as a "repeat offender", having been sent off for a similar offence at the start of the previous season. The suspension would cause him to miss a game against his former team, 1899 Hoffenheim, and bottom team Eintracht Braunschweig. Ibišević apologised for his actions.

On 6 August 2014, Ibišević extended his contract with VfB Stuttgart until June 2017. In October 2014, Ibišević broke his foot and subsequently missed nine games, returning in late January 2015.

=== Hertha BSC ===
Ibišević was loaned to Hertha BSC on 30 August 2015, making the deal permanent in July 2016. Ibišević debuted for his new club against VfB Stuttgart on 12 September 2015. On 22 September, he scored twice in a 2–0 home win over 1. FC Köln, ending a 25-game goal drought. On 3 October, Ibišević scored two goals in three minutes in a 3–0 win over Hamburger SV. On 17 October, Ibišević received a straight red card in the 18th minute against Schalke 04 for a challenge on Max Meyer in an eventual 2–1 loss, which got him suspended for four games. Ibišević scored his third brace of the season against Darmstadt 98 on 12 December to take his tally up to six for the season, with all his goals coming in pairs.

On 18 August 2016, Ibišević was named club's captain by head coach Pál Dárdai, replacing Fabian Lustenberger, who wore the armband for three years. On 27 November he scored his 100th goal in Bundesliga and became only the sixth foreigner in league's history to do so. The following day, he signed a new three-year contract with the club. On 5 March 2017, Ibišević played his 250th game in Bundesliga.

On 1 December 2018, in his 300th Bundesliga game, Ibišević scored a goal against Hannover 96. On 9 March 2018, in a match against Freiburg, Ibišević scored an own goal, resulting in the 2–1 loss away from home. A week later, Ibišević was subbed on for Salomon Kalou, taking the captain's armband during the latter stages of a home match against Borussia Dortmund. Having led the game twice, Hertha conceded in the 92nd minute making the score 3–2 to Dortmund. During the final minute of the game, Ibišević was given a straight red card after VAR review, for throwing a ball and hitting the head of Dortmund keeper Roman Bürki.

=== Schalke 04 ===
On 3 September 2020, Ibišević signed a one-year contract with Schalke 04. Just 12 weeks later, Schalke announced that his contract with the club would be terminated on 31 December 2020.

== International career ==
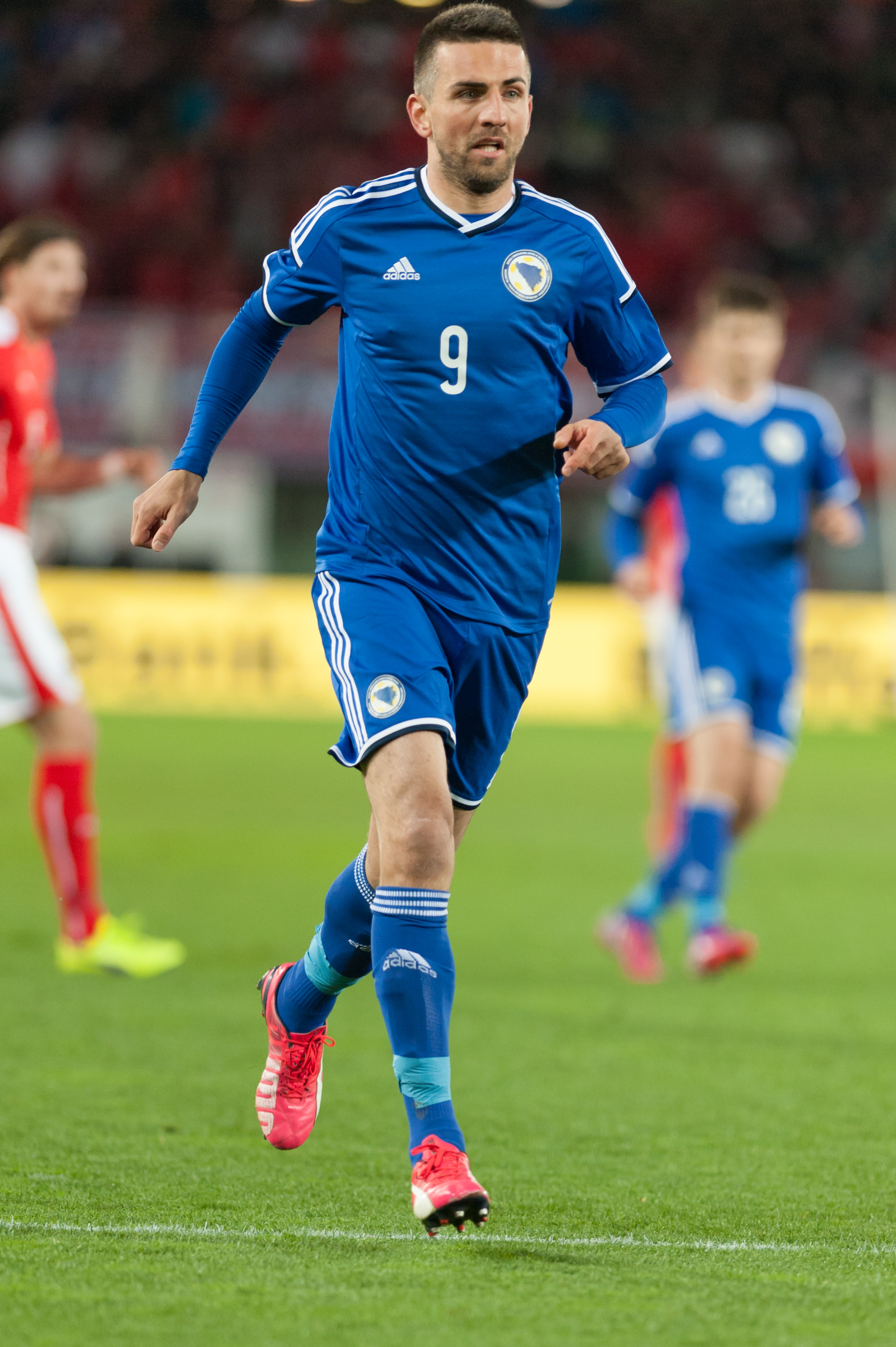
Ibišević playing for Bosnia and Herzegovina in 2015

Ibišević was part of Bosnia and Herzegovina under-21 team, playing five games and scoring one goal.

On 24 March 2007, Ibišević debuted as a starter for Bosnia and Herzegovina in a UEFA Euro 2008 qualifying match against Norway. On 13 October 2007, he scored his first international goal against Greece in Athens, in a 3–2 loss.

On 7 September 2012, Ibišević scored his first international hat-trick away to Liechtenstein. He has also set up Edin Džeko for another goal during the match. By scoring the only goal of the match against Lithuania on 15 October 2013, Ibišević ensured Bosnia would make its first ever appearance at a FIFA World Cup.

In June 2014, he was named in Bosnia's 23-man squad for the 2014 FIFA World Cup. He debuted in the opening group game of the competition and scored first ever Bosnian goal at the World Cup finals in a 1–2 loss against Argentina at the Maracanã Stadium.

In a penultimate UEFA Euro 2016 qualifier, due to absence of Edin Džeko, Ibišević started against Wales and scored a crucial goal in the 90th minute to keep Bosnia's qualification hopes alive.

Ibišević retired from international football at the end of Bosnia's unsuccessful 2018 World Cup qualifying campaign. He, along with Emir Spahić and Zvjezdan Misimović, was called up for a friendly game against Montenegro in May 2018, which Bosnian FA used to commemorate them for all of their achievements in the national team and to give the crowd one last chance to see them in the national jersey. They played the opening 20 minutes and the fans gave them a standing ovation as they were exiting the Bilino Polje turf.

== Personal life ==
Ibišević is from a Bosniak family. At an early age, his family moved to Switzerland, and ten months later to St. Louis, Missouri, in the United States. While he has spoken some about his experiences during the Bosnian War that forced his family to leave Bosnia, he is not known to have ever revealed all of the details. According to a profile on Ibišević by American writer Wright Thompson in 2014:

No one in Germany knows the whole story about his escape from the war. During his three years in St. Louis, he never told a single person at school, not a friend, teacher or coach. The most common answers he gives to any question about the war is "It's OK" or "We were lucky."

Even his wife Zerina, who lost her father in the war, believes her husband has not told her the whole story; in the Thompson piece, she said, "I still have a feeling that I know maybe 20 percent. I swear."

At the time of the Thompson story, Ibišević and his wife lived near Stuttgart with their young son Ismail. Thompson noted that when Ibišević looked for a house when he transferred to VfB Stuttgart, he "found himself drawn" to one that reminded him of the family home in Bosnia that they were forced to abandon during the war. He also bought a home for his father Šaban in Tuzla that had previously been owned by his father's employer, which according to Thompson was "a symbol of what the war had taken". The home is more a spiritual balm for Šaban, since he continues to live in St. Louis, where he manages apartment buildings that his son owns. Ibišević also rebuilt his father's boyhood home in their former village of Gerovi, and has built several war memorials in the area.

Ibišević and his wife Zerina (née Medić) became parents for the second time in October 2016. Zerina gave birth to a girl which they named Zejna. Their son Ismail was born in 2012. Their third child, son Idris, was born in 2019.

Ibišević is a Muslim. During the 2014 World Cup, he, along with international teammates Muhamed Bešić and Edin Višća visited Cuiabá Central Mosque in Cuiabá.

Ibišević's cousin, Elvir is also a footballer, and made his senior international debut for Bosnia and Herzegovina on 28 January 2018.

== Career statistics ==
=== Club ===
Appearances and goals by club, season and competition
Club	Season	League			National cup		League cup		Continental		Total	
Club	Season	Division	Apps	Goals	Apps	Goals	Apps	Goals	Apps	Goals	Apps	Goals
Paris Saint-Germain	2004–05	Ligue 1	4	0	0	0	2	0	0	0	6	0
Dijon (loan)	2004–05	Ligue 2	12	4	—		—		—		12	4
Dijon (loan)	2005–06	Ligue 2	21	6	0	0	1	0	—		22	6
Dijon (loan)	Total		33	10	0	0	1	0	—		34	10
Alemannia Aachen	2006–07	Bundesliga	24	6	3	0	—		—		27	6
1899 Hoffenheim	2007–08	2. Bundesliga	31	5	3	1	—		—		34	6
1899 Hoffenheim	2008–09	Bundesliga	17	18	2	1	—		—		19	19
1899 Hoffenheim	2009–10	Bundesliga	34	12	4	1	—		—		38	13
1899 Hoffenheim	2010–11	Bundesliga	31	8	2	2	—		—		33	10
1899 Hoffenheim	2011–12	Bundesliga	10	5	1	1	—		—		11	6
1899 Hoffenheim	Total		123	48	12	6	—		—		135	54
VfB Stuttgart	2011–12	Bundesliga	15	8	1	0	—		—		16	8
VfB Stuttgart	2012–13	Bundesliga	30	15	6	4	—		11	5	47	24
VfB Stuttgart	2013–14	Bundesliga	27	10	2	3	—		4	2	33	15
VfB Stuttgart	2014–15	Bundesliga	14	0	1	0	—		—		15	0
VfB Stuttgart	Total		86	33	10	7	—		15	7	111	47
Hertha BSC (loan)	2015–16	Bundesliga	26	10	4	2	—		—		30	12
Hertha BSC	2016–17	Bundesliga	32	12	3	0	—		2	2	37	14
Hertha BSC	2017–18	Bundesliga	27	6	2	1	—		4	0	33	7
Hertha BSC	2018–19	Bundesliga	28	10	3	2	—		—		31	12
Hertha BSC	2019–20	Bundesliga	25	7	2	2	—		—		27	9
Hertha BSC	Hertha total		138	45	14	7	—		6	2	158	54
Schalke 04	2020–21	Bundesliga	4	0	1	1	—		—		5	1
Career total			412	142	40	21	3	0	21	9	476	172

=== International ===
Appearances and goals by national team and year
National team	Year	Apps	Goals
Bosnia and Herzegovina	2007	7	1
Bosnia and Herzegovina	2008	6	2
Bosnia and Herzegovina	2009	7	1
Bosnia and Herzegovina	2010	8	3
Bosnia and Herzegovina	2011	6	1
Bosnia and Herzegovina	2012	9	6
Bosnia and Herzegovina	2013	9	6
Bosnia and Herzegovina	2014	10	4
Bosnia and Herzegovina	2015	9	1
Bosnia and Herzegovina	2016	6	1
Bosnia and Herzegovina	2017	5	2
Bosnia and Herzegovina	2018	1	0
Total		83	28

Scores and results list Bosnia and Herzegovina's goal tally first, score column indicates score after each Ibišević goal.

List of international goals scored by Vedad Ibišević
No.	Date	Venue	Opponent	Score	Result	Competition
1	13 October 2007	Olympic Stadium, Athens, Greece	Greece	2–3	2–3	UEFA Euro 2008 qualifying
2	19 November 2008	Ljudski vrt, Maribor, Slovenia	Slovenia	1–0	4–3	Friendly
3	19 November 2008	Ljudski vrt, Maribor, Slovenia	Slovenia	4–1	4–3	Friendly
4	10 October 2009	A. Le Coq Arena, Tallinn, Estonia	Estonia	2–0	2–0	2010 FIFA World Cup qualification
5	3 March 2010	Asim Ferhatović Hase, Sarajevo, Bosnia and Herzegovina	Ghana	1–1	2–1	Friendly
6	10 August 2010	Grbavica, Sarajevo, Bosnia and Herzegovina	Qatar	1–0	1–1	Friendly
7	8 October 2010	Qemal Stafa Stadium, Tirana, Albania	Albania	1–0	1–1	UEFA Euro 2012 qualifying
8	26 March 2011	Bilino Polje, Zenica, Bosnia and Herzegovina	Romania	1–1	2–1	UEFA Euro 2012 qualifying
9	28 February 2012	AFG Arena, St. Gallen, Switzerland	Brazil	1–1	1–2	Friendly
10	15 August 2012	Parc y Scarlets, Llanelli, Wales	Wales	1–0	2–0	Friendly
11	7 September 2012	Rheinpark Stadion, Vaduz, Liechtenstein	Liechtenstein	3–0	8–1	2014 FIFA World Cup qualification
12	7 September 2012	Rheinpark Stadion, Vaduz, Liechtenstein	Liechtenstein	4–0	8–1	2014 FIFA World Cup qualification
13	7 September 2012	Rheinpark Stadion, Vaduz, Liechtenstein	Liechtenstein	8–1	8–1	2014 FIFA World Cup qualification
14	16 October 2012	Bilino Polje, Zenica, Bosnia and Herzegovina	Lithuania	1–0	3–0	2014 FIFA World Cup qualification
15	6 February 2013	Stožice Stadium, Ljubljana, Slovenia	Slovenia	1–0	3–0	Friendly
16	22 March 2013	Bilino Polje, Zenica, Bosnia and Herzegovina	Greece	2–0	3–1	2014 FIFA World Cup qualification
17	7 June 2013	Skonto Stadium, Riga, Latvia	Latvia	2–0	5–0	2014 FIFA World Cup qualification
18	14 August 2013	Asim Ferhatović Hase, Sarajevo, Bosnia and Herzegovina	United States	2–0	3–4	Friendly
19	11 October 2013	Bilino Polje, Zenica, Bosnia and Herzegovina	Liechtenstein	3–0	4–1	2014 FIFA World Cup qualification
20	15 October 2013	Darius and Girėnas Stadium, Kaunas, Lithuania	Lithuania	1–0	1–0	2014 FIFA World Cup qualification
21	15 June 2014	Estádio do Maracanã, Rio de Janeiro, Brazil	Argentina	1–2	1–2	2014 FIFA World Cup
22	4 September 2014	Tušanj, Tuzla, Bosnia and Herzegovina	Liechtenstein	1–0	3–0	Friendly
23	4 September 2014	Tušanj, Tuzla, Bosnia and Herzegovina	Liechtenstein	2–0	3–0	Friendly
24	9 September 2014	Bilino Polje, Zenica, Bosnia and Herzegovina	Cyprus	1–0	1–2	UEFA Euro 2016 qualifying
25	10 October 2015	Bilino Polje, Zenica, Bosnia and Herzegovina	Wales	2–0	2–0	UEFA Euro 2016 qualifying
26	6 September 2016	Bilino Polje, Zenica, Bosnia and Herzegovina	Estonia	4–0	5–0	2018 FIFA World Cup qualification
27	25 March 2017	Bilino Polje, Zenica, Bosnia and Herzegovina	Gibraltar	1–0	5–0	2018 FIFA World Cup qualification
28	25 March 2017	Bilino Polje, Zenica, Bosnia and Herzegovina	Gibraltar	2–0	5–0	2018 FIFA World Cup qualification

== Honours ==
Individual

- Conference USA Men's Soccer Freshman of the Year: 2003
- Bosnian Footballer of the Year: 2008
- kicker Bundesliga Team of the Season: 2008–09
- ESM Team of the Year: 2008–09
