= Emir Spahić =

Bosnian footballer and administrator (born 1980)

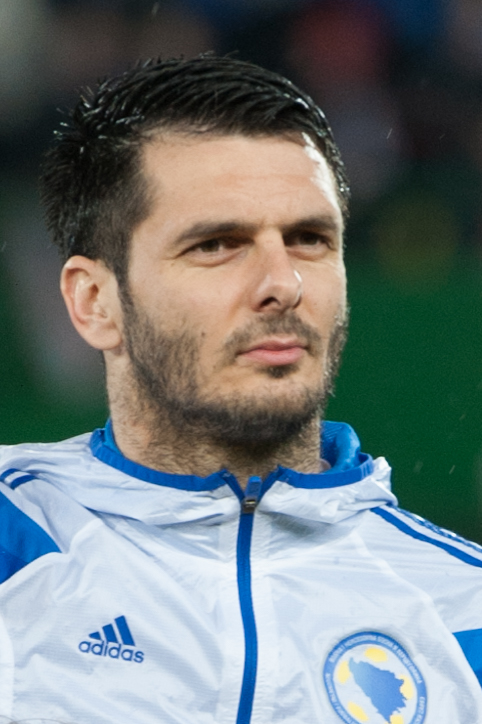
- Spahić with Bosnia and Herzegovina in 2015

Personal information
- Full name: Emir Spahić
- Date of birth: 18 August 1980 (age 46)
- Place of birth: Dubrovnik, SR Croatia, Yugoslavia
- Height: 1.86 m (6 ft 1 in)
- Position: Centre back

Team information
- Current team: Bosnia and Herzegovina (director)

Youth career
- Krajina Cazin
- –1998: Čelik Zenica

Senior career*
Years	Team	Apps	(Gls)
1998–1999	Čelik Zenica	19	(1)
1999–2001	GOŠK Dubrovnik	22	(0)
2001–2004	Zagreb	38	(2)
2004–2005	Shinnik Yaroslavl	26	(6)
2005–2006	Torpedo Moscow	15	(0)
2006–2009	Lokomotiv Moscow	63	(3)
2009–2011	Montpellier	57	(3)
2011–2013	Sevilla	44	(1)
2013	→ Anzhi Makhachkala (loan)	7	(1)
2013–2015	Bayer Leverkusen	49	(3)
2015–2017	Hamburger SV	37	(0)
Total		377	(20)

International career
2003–2018	Bosnia and Herzegovina	95	(6)
- * Club domestic league appearances and goals

Emir Spahić (Bosnian pronunciation: [ěmir spǎxiːtɕ]; born 18 August 1980) is a Bosnian football executive and former player who played as a centre-back. He is the current director of the Bosnia and Herzegovina national team.

During his club career, Spahić represented teams in his homeland, Croatia, Russia, France, Spain and Germany. Captain of the Bosnia and Herzegovina national team from 2008 until the end of the 2014 FIFA World Cup, he earned a total of 95 international caps, scoring 6 goals.

== Club career ==
Over the course of his career, Spahić played for Zagreb, Shinnik Yaroslavl, Lokomotiv Moscow and Anzhi Makhachkala.

He played for Zagreb and Leverkusen in the Champions League and with Montpellier, Sevilla and Lokomotiv in the Europa League.

Lionel Messi once stated that Spahić was among the best center-backs he had played against in Spain.

=== Montpellier ===
On 24 June 2009, Spahić announced that he would join newly promoted Montpellier for the 2009–10 Ligue 1 season. On his league debut against Paris Saint-Germain, he scored a header in the 94th minute for a 1–1 draw, earning his side a point.

=== Sevilla ===
On 4 July 2011, Spahić agreed a transfer with Spanish side Sevilla for €2 million until July 2014. His national teammate Miroslav Stevanović also transferred to Sevilla in January 2013 and upon his arrival at San Pablo International Airport, he was received by Spahić. Spahić scored his first goal for Sevilla on 5 January 2013 in a 1–0 victory against Osasuna.

=== Anzhi Makhachkala ===
On 26 February 2013, Spahić left Sevilla on loan to Anzhi Makhachkala of the Russian Premier League. He scored his first goal for the club on 14 April 2013 against Volga Nizhny Novgorod.

=== Bayer Leverkusen ===
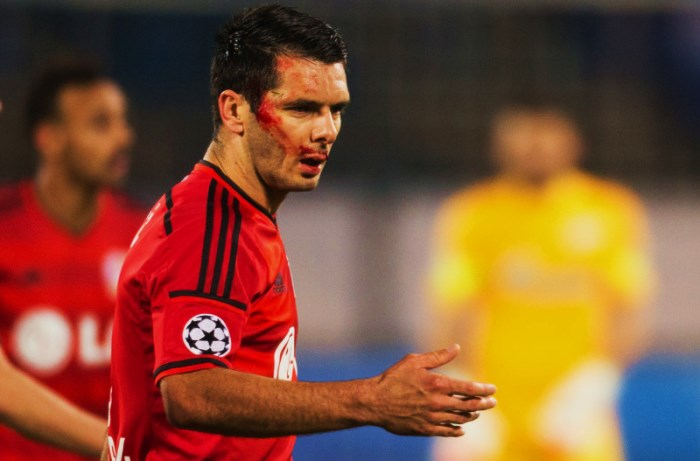
Spahić with Bayer Leverkusen in November 2014

On 28 June 2013, Spahić was signed by Bayer Leverkusen of the German Bundesliga on a two-year contract. He conceded a penalty and was later sent off in a Champions League last-16 first-leg game on 18 February 2014, as Paris Saint-Germain beat Leverkusen 4–0. On 20 April, he scored his first two goals for the club in a 4–1 league victory against 1. FC Nürnberg.

On 30 August 2014, 34-year-old Spahić headed in a goal from a free kick to level the score at 2–2 in a game that finished 4–2 for Leverkusen against Hertha BSC, thus ensuring his team's unbeaten start to the season.

Spahić was sent off for two yellow cards in a 4–5 home defeat against VfL Wolfsburg on 14 February 2015; having been 1–4 down, the score was level at his time of dismissal.

On 30 March 2015, Spahić was named the best defender in Europe (in front of Martín Demichelis of Manchester City, Mats Hummels of Borussia Dortmund, Chris Smalling of Manchester United and Thiago Silva of PSG) by International Centre for Sports Studies (CIES). Spahić had his contract terminated on 12 April for headbutting a member of club's security personnel reportedly after they refused to allow his friends entry inside the dressing room area.

=== Hamburger SV ===
On 5 July 2015, fellow Bundesliga team Hamburger SV confirmed Spahić as the team's newest player, signing a one-year contract lasting until June 2016. He credited the move to his compatriot, former Hamburg player Sergej Barbarez, and expressed gratefulness at being given a second chance after his expulsion from Leverkusen. He was released by the club on 3 January 2017.

== International career ==
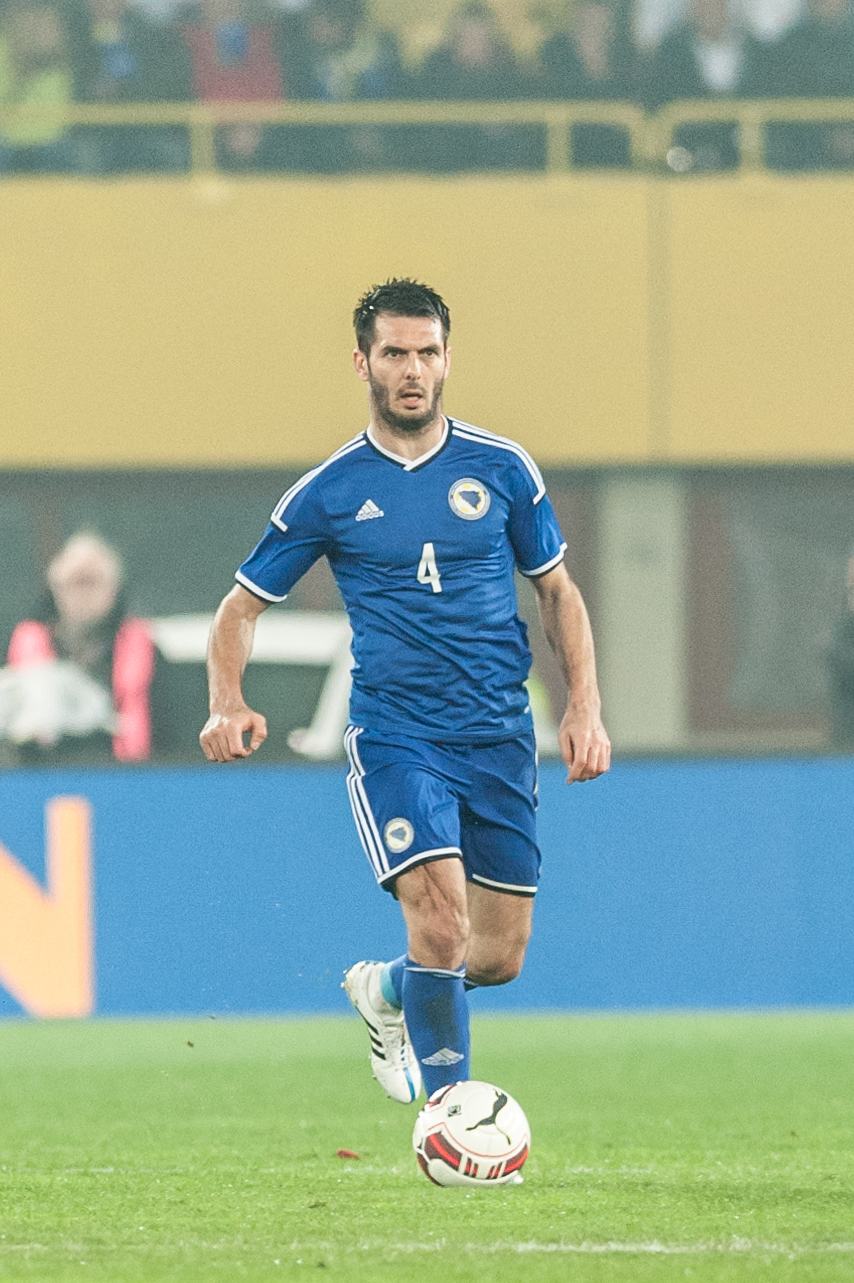
Spahić playing for Bosnia and Herzegovina in 2015

On 7 June 2003, Spahić made his debut as a substitute against Romania at Stadionul Ion Oblemenco in Craiova. On 28 February 2006, he scored his first international goal, in a friendly game against Japan, played in Dortmund.

Ever since his debut, he was an important member of the national team and served as their captain for a number of years. He headed a ball into the box and assisted Ermin Bičakčić who scored a crucial equalizer versus Slovakia in Žilina during the 2014 FIFA World Cup qualifiers. Bosnia and Herzegovina came back from one goal down in that game to win 2–1 and stay top of their qualifying group for ahead of Greece.

Spahić retired from international football on 7 August 2014. After his retirement, Bosnia lost their first game of Euro 2016 qualifiers versus Cyprus (ranked 121 places behind Bosnia in FIFA Ranking for August 2014) without Spahić, which resulted in manager Safet Sušić calling him back from retirement on 22 September for the games that followed against Wales and Belgium. At the time, Bosnia's key defenders were either injured or lacked competitive matches for their clubs, which prompted in Spahić's call-up to the national side. Due to injury, he missed those two games and later returned to international stage against Israel on 16 November where he played the full game, his first since playing against Iran at the 2014 FIFA World Cup.

On 29 May 2016, he scored in a 3–1 friendly loss to Spain in St. Gallen, Switzerland, and was sent off before half time for an altercation with Cesc Fàbregas.

On 28 May 2018, Spahić played his farewell game as professional footballer in a 0–0 friendly draw against Montenegro. After 18 minutes on the pitch, he was substituted alongside the two other retiring national team regulars, Zvjezdan Misimović and Vedad Ibišević, to a standing ovation.

== Executive career ==
On 19 April 2024, Spahić took up the position of director of the Bosnia and Herzegovina national team, replacing former national teammate Zvjezdan Misimović.

== Personal life ==
Spahić identifies as an ethnic Bosniak. His father is from Sandžak, and his mother is from Gacko. They met while both were working in Dubrovnik. Emir has two brothers, the older being Nermin and younger one Alen, who is also a football player. Spahić is a first cousin of fellow national team player Edin Džeko.

Spahić is a fan of tennis, and has followed live matches in Dubai, Barcelona, Montpellier and Paris. He was enrolled at the University of Sarajevo, earning a degree in sport and physical education. Aside from his native Bosnian, he speaks English, Spanish, French, German and Russian to varying degrees of fluency.

On 30 August 2019, Spahić was involved in a car accident, when his SUV rolled over on the road, sustaining multiple non-life-threatening injuries. In 2021, he was a candidate on the list of the local Dubrovnik regionalist party DUSTRA for the local elections in Croatia, but failed to enter the Dubrovnik City Council. In 2023, he became president of the executive board of the Islamic Community of Dubrovnik.

== Career statistics ==
=== International ===
Appearances and goals by national team and year
National team	Year	Apps	Goals
Bosnia and Herzegovina	2003	4	0
Bosnia and Herzegovina	2004	4	0
Bosnia and Herzegovina	2005	8	0
Bosnia and Herzegovina	2006	5	1
Bosnia and Herzegovina	2007	0	0
Bosnia and Herzegovina	2008	6	1
Bosnia and Herzegovina	2009	10	0
Bosnia and Herzegovina	2010	8	0
Bosnia and Herzegovina	2011	10	1
Bosnia and Herzegovina	2012	7	0
Bosnia and Herzegovina	2013	9	0
Bosnia and Herzegovina	2014	7	0
Bosnia and Herzegovina	2015	9	0
Bosnia and Herzegovina	2016	7	3
Bosnia and Herzegovina	2017	0	0
Bosnia and Herzegovina	2018	1	0
Total		94	6

Scores and results list Bosnia and Herzegovina's goal tally first, score column indicates score after each Spahić goal.

List of international goals scored by Emir Spahić
No.	Date	Venue	Opponent	Score	Result	Competition
1	28 February 2006	Signal Iduna Park, Dortmund, Germany	Japan	2–1	2–2	Friendly
2	15 October 2008	Bilino Polje, Zenica, Bosnia and Herzegovina	Armenia	1–0	4–1	2010 FIFA World Cup qualification
3	15 November 2011	Estádio da Luz, Lisbon, Portugal	Portugal	2–3	2–6	UEFA Euro 2012 qualifying play-offs
4	29 May 2016	AFG Arena, St. Gallen, Switzerland	Spain	1–2	1–3	Friendly
5	6 September 2016	Bilino Polje, Zenica, Bosnia and Herzegovina	Estonia	1–0	5–0	2018 FIFA World Cup qualification
6	6 September 2016	Bilino Polje, Zenica, Bosnia and Herzegovina	Estonia	5–0	5–0	2018 FIFA World Cup qualification

== Honours ==
Zagreb

- Croatian First League: 2001–02

Lokomotiv Moscow

- Russian Cup: 2006–07
