= Sejad Salihović =

Bosnian footballer (born 1984)

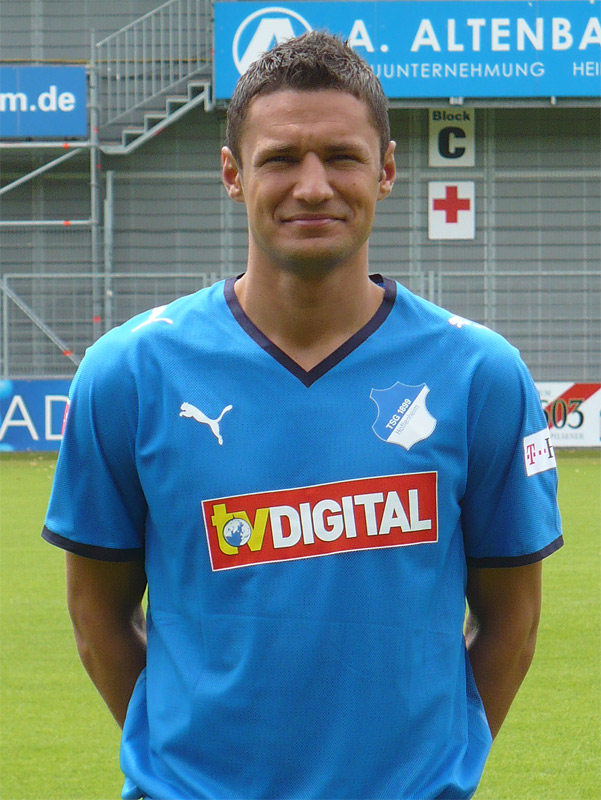
- Salihović with 1899 Hoffenheim in 2008

Personal information
- Date of birth: 8 October 1984 (age 42)
- Place of birth: Zvornik, SR Bosnia and Herzegovina, SFR Yugoslavia
- Height: 1.82 m (6 ft 0 in)
- Position: Midfielder

Team information
- Current team: Bosnia and Herzegovina U21 (assistant)

Youth career
- 1995–1998: Minerva Berlin
- 1998–2000: Hertha Zehlendorf
- 2000–2003: Hertha BSC

Senior career*
Years	Team	Apps	(Gls)
2003–2006	Hertha BSC II	88	(35)
2004–2006	Hertha BSC	5	(0)
2006–2012	1899 Hoffenheim II	2	(0)
2006–2015	1899 Hoffenheim	228	(62)
2015–2017	Beijing Renhe	28	(5)
2017	St. Gallen	13	(0)
2017–2018	Hamburger SV	10	(1)
2019–2020	DJK Frankenthal	0	(0)
2021	1899 Hoffenheim II	27	(6)

International career
2005–2006	Bosnia and Herzegovina U21	9	(3)
2007–2015	Bosnia and Herzegovina	47	(4)

Managerial career
- 2020–2021: 1899 Hoffenheim II (assistant)
- 2021: 1899 Hoffenheim II (player-assistant)
- 2021–2022: 1899 Hoffenheim II (assistant)
- 2025–: Bosnia and Herzegovina U21 (assistant)
- * Club domestic league appearances and goals

Sejad Salihović (Bosnian pronunciation: [sějad sâːlixoʋitɕ]; born 8 October 1984) is a Bosnian professional football manager and former player who is currently an assistant coach for the Bosnia and Herzegovina national U21 team. He spent most of his career playing for 1899 Hoffenheim in the German Bundesliga. He also played for Hertha BSC, Beijing Renhe, St. Gallen and Hamburger SV.

For eight years, from 2007 to 2015, Salihović played for the Bosnia and Herzegovina national team, earning 47 caps and scoring 4 goals for the team. He represented the nation at their first major tournament, the 2014 FIFA World Cup.

== Club career ==
=== Early career ===
Salihović began his career in the youth teams of lower-league sides Minerva Berlin and Hertha Zehlendorf. In the 2000–01 season, he was transferred to Hertha BSC, where he played for the U17 and U19 teams before eventually entering the reserve team in 2003.

=== Hertha BSC ===
Salihović was promoted to the first team in 2004. He made his professional debut in a Bundesliga match against Hamburger SV on 26 September 2004, which ended in a 1–2 defeat.

=== 1899 Hoffenheim ===
In 2006, Salihović was transferred to 1899 Hoffenheim. In his first season, the team played in Regionalliga Süd, at the time third-tier league in Germany. At the end of the season, they managed to get promoted to 2. Bundesliga.

He was rated by kicker as the best player of 2. Bundesliga in 2007–08 season with the best over-all grades, as 1899 Hoffenheim were once again promoted, this time to Bundesliga.

Salihović helped 1899 Hoffenheim finish on the top of the table heading into the winter break in their first Bundesliga season. However, they could not continue in the same rhythm, finishing season only seventh.

At the end of the 2012–13 season, Salihović scored two late penalties against Borussia Dortmund to secure relegation play-off matches, ultimately saving his team from being relegated.

His last seasons at 1899 Hoffenheim were plagued by injuries, limiting his playing time and performance.

Salihović left 1889 Hoffenheim in 2015, after nine years, becoming the record appearance maker in the club's history.

=== Beijing Renhe ===
On 7 June 2015, 1899 Hoffenheim announced on their official website that Salihović would leave the club to join Chinese Super League side Beijing Renhe.

=== St. Gallen ===
In February 2017, Salihović signed with Swiss Super League side St. Gallen until the end of the season. As his contract was not renewed, he left the club on a free transfer in June 2017.

=== Hamburger SV ===
On 13 September 2017, Salihović signed a one-year contract with Hamburger SV, returning to Bundesliga after more than two years. He made his debut on 15 September, in a 0–2 loss against Hannover 96. Salihović scored his first goal against Mainz 05, in an eventual 2–3 loss. At the end of the season, Salihović left the club as his contract was not renewed.

=== Retirement ===
On 4 April 2019, Salihović's adviser Tolga Dirican announced that despite offers from many 2. Bundesliga clubs, Salihović decided to end his career. In 2021, he returned to professional football, and played for 1899 Hoffenheim II.

== International career ==
Salihović was a regular member of Bosnia and Herzegovina under-21 team. During October 2006, while playing for the Bosnia and Herzegovina under-21 team, Salihović scored twice in the team's 2–3 aggregate loss to Czech Republic under-21 in the play-offs for 2007 UEFA European Under-21 Football Championship. Both his goals were shots from over 25 meters out.

Since then, Salihović has been promoted to the senior side and has become an important member of the team. He debuted on 13 October 2007 in a 2–3 UEFA Euro 2008 qualifying loss to Greece, and scored his first goal against Oman on 9 June 2009 in a friendly game. Although his favorite position is in midfield, he has often been used as a left back in lack of other options. Due to unsporting behavior in game against Portugal during 2010 FIFA World Cup qualification play-offs, Salihović was suspended for four games, missing the UEFA Euro 2012 qualification games against Luxembourg, France, Albania and Romania. He returned for a friendly match against Slovakia, which Bosnia won 3–2 in Bratislava.

In June 2014, he was named in Bosnia and Herzegovina's squad for the 2014 FIFA World Cup, the country's first big competition. He played at all three games that Bosnia played at the World Cup. In the 2–1 and 1–0 losses against Argentina and Nigeria and in a 3–1 win against Iran.

After Bosnia failed to qualify to the 2016 UEFA Euro, Salihović, even though he never announced it, left the national team.

== Personal life ==
Salihović and his family migrated to Berlin in 1992, right before the Bosnian War started. In June 2009, after 17 years, Sejad visited his hometown of Zvornik where his parents Ismet and Fadila were renovating their home. His hobbies include reading, playing football, and spending time with his family.

On 15 December 2014, Salihović married his girlfriend. In April 2015, the couple became parents of a boy. The couple also divorced officially in 2019 after many scandals.

== Style of play ==
Salihović had a powerful shot with his left foot and was a free-kick specialist right up to his retirement.

== Career statistics ==
=== Club ===
As of match played 29 August 2018.

Club	Season	League			Cup		Continental		Other		Total	
Club	Season	Division	Apps	Goals	Apps	Goals	Apps	Goals	Apps	Goals	Apps	Goals
Hertha BSC II	2003–04	NOFV-Oberliga Nord	31	13	–		–		–		31	13
Hertha BSC II	2004–05	Regionalliga Nord	27	14	1	0	–		–		28	14
Hertha BSC II	2005–06	Regionalliga Nord	30	8	–		–		–		30	8
Hertha BSC II	Total		88	35	1	0	–		–		89	35
Hertha BSC	2004–05	Bundesliga	5	0	0	0	–		–		5	0
Hertha BSC	2005–06	Bundesliga	0	0	0	0	0	0	1 (Note: Appearance in 2005 DFL-Ligapokal)	0	1	0
Hertha BSC	Total		5	0	0	0	0	0	1	0	6	0
1899 Hoffenheim II	2006–07	Oberliga Baden-Württemberg	1	0	–		–		–		1	0
1899 Hoffenheim II	2011–12	Regionalliga Süd	1	0	–		–		–		1	0
1899 Hoffenheim II	Total		2	0	–		–		–		2	0
1899 Hoffenheim	2006–07	Regionalliga Süd	30	10	–		–		–		30	10
1899 Hoffenheim	2007–08	2. Bundesliga	27	6	4	1	–		–		31	7
1899 Hoffenheim	2008–09	Bundesliga	29	8	1	1	–		–		30	9
1899 Hoffenheim	2009–10	Bundesliga	32	4	4	1	–		–		36	5
1899 Hoffenheim	2010–11	Bundesliga	26	5	4	0	–		–		30	5
1899 Hoffenheim	2011–12	Bundesliga	23	9	3	2	–		–		26	11
1899 Hoffenheim	2012–13	Bundesliga	20	7	1	0	–		2 (Note: Appearances in 2012–13 Bundesliga relegation play-offs)	0	23	7
1899 Hoffenheim	2013–14	Bundesliga	28	11	2	0	–		–		30	11
1899 Hoffenheim	2014–15	Bundesliga	13	2	0	0	–		–		13	2
1899 Hoffenheim	Total		228	62	19	5	–		2	0	249	67
Beijing Renhe	2015	Chinese Super League	15	2	0	0	–		–		15	2
Beijing Renhe	2016	China League One	13	3	0	0	–		–		13	3
Beijing Renhe	Total		28	5	0	0	–		–		28	5
St. Gallen	2016–17	Swiss Super League	13	0	–		–		–		13	0
Hamburger SV	2017–18	Bundesliga	10	1	–		–		–		10	1
Career total			374	103	20	5	0	0	3	0	397	108

=== International ===
As of match played 13 October 2015.

National team	Year	Apps	Goals
Bosnia and Herzegovina
Bosnia and Herzegovina	2007	3	0
Bosnia and Herzegovina	2008	6	0
Bosnia and Herzegovina	2009	8	2
Bosnia and Herzegovina	2010	4	1
Bosnia and Herzegovina	2011	5	1
Bosnia and Herzegovina	2012	7	0
Bosnia and Herzegovina	2013	6	0
Bosnia and Herzegovina	2014	6	0
Bosnia and Herzegovina	2015	2	0
Total		47	4

=== International goals ===
Scores and results list Bosnia and Herzegovina's goal tally first.

Goal	Date	Venue	Opponent	Score	Result	Competition
1	9 June 2009	Stade Pierre de Coubertin, Cannes, France	Oman	2–1	2–1	Friendly
2	9 September 2009	Bilino Polje, Zenica, Bosnia and Herzegovina	Turkey	1–1	1–1	2010 FIFA World Cup qualification
3	29 May 2010	Råsunda Stadium, Solna, Sweden	Sweden	1–1	2–4	Friendly
4	2 September 2011	Dinamo Stadium, Minsk, Belarus	Belarus	1–0	2–0	UEFA Euro 2012 qualifying
