= Tomislav Piplica =

Bosnian football manager (born 1969)

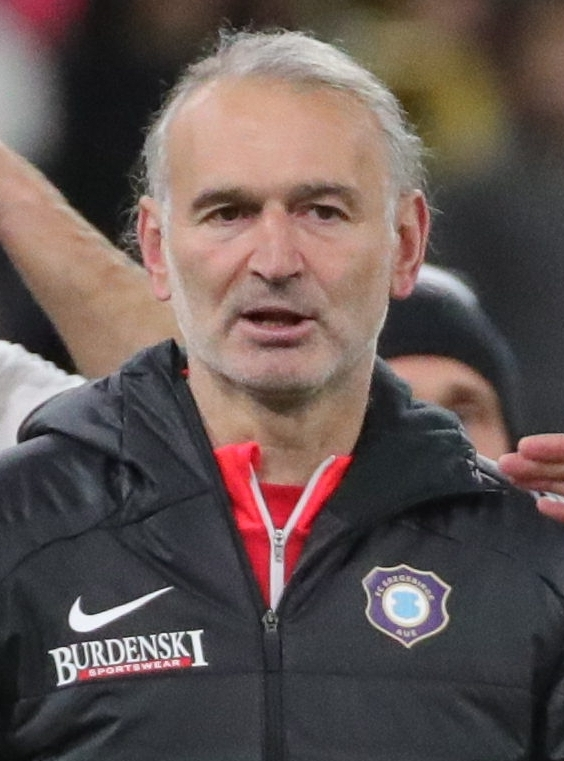
- Piplica in 2022

Personal information
- Date of birth: 5 April 1969 (age 57)
- Place of birth: Bugojno, SR Bosnia and Herzegovina, SFR Yugoslavia
- Height: 1.82 m (6 ft 0 in)
- Position: Goalkeeper

Youth career
- Iskra Bugojno

Senior career*
Years	Team	Apps	(Gls)
1981–1989	Iskra Bugojno		
1989–1991	NK Zagreb		
1991–1992	Istra	15	(0)
1993–1997	Segesta	115	(4)
1997–1998	Samobor	14	(0)
1998–2009	Energie Cottbus	248	(0)
2012–2015	FC Eilenburg	28	(0)

International career
1987	Yugoslavia U20		
2001–2002	Bosnia and Herzegovina	8	(0)

Managerial career
- 2009–2011: Energie Cottbus (gk coach/scout)
- 2010–2014: Bosnia and Herzegovina (gk coach)
- 2012–2013: FC Eilenburg (Co-Manager)
- 2012: → Hartenfels Torgau 04 (Interim)
- 2013–2015: FC Eilenburg
- 2016–2017: FSV Wacker 90 Nordhausen
- 2020–2021: SpVgg Bayreuth II
- 2024: 1. FC Lokomotive Leipzig (caretaker)
Medal record
Representing Yugoslavia
Gold medal – first place	FIFA U-20 World Cup	1987
- * Club domestic league appearances and goals

Tomislav Piplica (born 5 April 1969) is a Bosnian football manager who formerly played as goalkeeper. His nickname is "Pipi" and he is considered to be a cult-goalkeeper, in Germany as well as in Bosnia and Herzegovina.

== Playing career ==
=== Club ===
Piplica has played in his career for NK Iskra Bugojno, NK Zagreb, NK Istra 1961, HNK Segesta, NK Samobor and FC Energie Cottbus.

Piplica became known both for his performances as a goalkeeper and for several notable goalkeeping errors. One of the most widely discussed incidents occurred in a 2002 match against Borussia Mönchengladbach, when he accidentally scored an own goal. Energie Cottbus had been leading 3–2 before the incident resulted in 3-3 draw.

Nevertheless, Piplica has a cult status with Energie fans, who nicknamed him "Pipi", and for the club president Ulrich Lepsch who claims that he was always special with special status in Cottbus.

He is also remembered for saving a penalty against legendary Bayern Munich goalkeeper Oliver Kahn in 2002. Bayern was leading 6-0 against Cottbus when Bayern was awarded a penalty. Kahn stepped up and attempted to score the first ever goal of his career but he was denied by Piplica and later retired without a scored goal.

Until the end of 2012, Piplica held the post of sports director of SC Hartenfels Torgau 04 and he also helped as a coach. On 9 November 2012, Piplica announced at the age of 43 years his playing comeback as a goalkeeper in the sixth division side FC Eilenburg, as their goalkeeper had broken his arm in an accident.

=== International ===
As a teenager Piplica was part of the Yugoslavian squad that won the 1987 FIFA Under-20 World Cup. However, as a backup goalkeeper to Dragoje Leković, he didn't get a single minute of action throughout the six matches.

Piplica made his senior debut for Bosnia and Herzegovina in a March 2001 World Cup qualification match against Austria in Sarajevo and has earned a total of 8 caps. His final international was an August 2002 friendly match against Serbia and Montenegro.

== Coaching career ==
After retiring he was named as scout and goalkeeper coach of his last club FC Energie Cottbus on 24 June 2009. On 12 February 2010, he was additionally named as the new goalkeeper coach of the Bosnia and Herzegovina national football team. On 15 October 2013, Bosnia and Herzegovina qualified for FIFA World Cup 2014.

On 5 January 2010, Piplica received his UEFA Pro Licence in Football Association of Bosnia and Herzegovina's educational facility in Jablanica, Bosnia and Herzegovina.

Besides Bosnia, as a head coach, he coached FC Eilenburg, SC Hartenfels Torgau 04, FSV Wacker 90 Nordhausen as well as the reserves of SpVgg Bayreuth. He also worked as a youth team coach at Carl Zeiss Jena. In February 2024, he became caretaker manager of 1. FC Lokomotive Leipzig.

== Personal life ==
He holds dual Bosnian and Croatian citizenship. His son Zak Paulo Piplica is footballer and plays for 1. FC Lokomotive Leipzig.

== Honours ==
=== Player ===
Iskra Bugojno

- Yugoslav Second League (West): 1983–84
- Mitropa Cup: 1984–85

Zagreb

- Yugoslav Second League: 1990–91
- Yugoslav Third League (West): 1989–90

Yugoslavia Youth

- FIFA World Youth Championship: 1987
