= Faruk Hujdurović =

Bosnian-Herzegovinian footballer (born 1970)

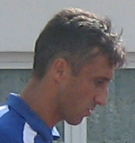

Personal information
- Date of birth: 14 May 1970 (age 56)
- Place of birth: Bijeljina, SFR Yugoslavia
- Height: 1.84 m (6 ft 0 in)
- Position: Centre-back

Senior career*
Years	Team	Apps	(Gls)
- Radnik Bijeljina
1993–1994	OFK Beograd	1	(0)
1996–1997	Publikum Celje	43	(3)
1998–2000	SV Ried	85	(5)
2001–2004	Energie Cottbus	65	(1)
2004–2005	Carl Zeiss Jena	50	(6)
2006	1. FC Eschborn	5	(1)
2006–2008	VFC Plauen	52	(3)
2008–2010	VfB Pößneck	48	(6)

International career
1999–2002	Bosnia and Herzegovina	11	(0)
- * Club domestic league appearances and goals

Faruk Hujdurović (born 14 May 1970) is a Bosnian-Herzegovinian former professional footballer who played as a centre-back.

== Club career ==
Hujdurović played with OFK Beograd in the 1993–94 First League of FR Yugoslavia. He also played for another Serbian club, FK AIK Bačka Topola, before moving to NK Celje playing in the Slovenian PrvaLiga. His career will start rising from this point, after Slovenia, his next stop was Austria, where he played three years with SV Ried in the Austrian Bundesliga and winning the Austrian Cup right in his first season there.

German Bundesliga side Energie Cottbus brought him during the winter-break of the 2000–01 season. He played three seasons in Cottbus in German highest level. Afterwards he stayed in Germany and played for several lower-level clubs, most notably for Carl Zeiss Jena.

There are sources that misspell his surname as Hajdurovic or Hajdukovic.

== International career ==
He made his debut for Bosnia and Herzegovina in an October 1999 European Championship qualification match away against Scotland and has earned a total of 11 caps, scoring no goals. His final international was a March 2002 friendly match against Macedonia.

== Honours ==
SV Ried

- Austrian Cup: 1997–98
