= Zlatan Bajramović =

Bosnian footballer (born 1979)

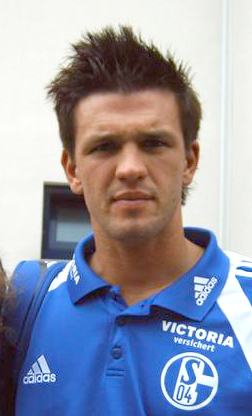
- Bajramović with Schalke 04 in 2005

Personal information
- Date of birth: 12 August 1979 (age 47)
- Place of birth: Hamburg, West Germany
- Height: 1.82 m (6 ft 0 in)
- Position: Defensive midfielder

Team information
- Current team: Bosnia and Herzegovina (assistant)

Senior career*
Years	Team	Apps	(Gls)
1997–2002	FC St. Pauli	121	(18)
2002–2005	SC Freiburg	72	(24)
2005–2008	Schalke 04	64	(6)
2008–2011	Eintracht Frankfurt	17	(0)
Total		274	(48)

International career
2002–2009	Bosnia and Herzegovina	35	(3)

Managerial career
- 2016: Bahlinger SC
- 2017: Karlsruher SC (caretaker)
- * Club domestic league appearances and goals

Zlatan Bajramović (Bosnian pronunciation: [zlǎtan bǎjramoʋitɕ]; born 12 August 1979) is a Bosnian professional football manager and former player who played as a defensive midfielder. He is currently working as an assistant coach for the Bosnia and Herzegovina national team.

== Club career ==
Bajramović spent all of his playing career in the country of his birth, Germany. After starting his career at FC St. Pauli, he moved to SC Freiburg in 2002, then in 2005 to Schalke 04. On 30 July 2008, Bajramović joined Eintracht Frankfurt. After numerous injuries, he retired from professional football in 2011.

== International career ==
Bajramović made his debut for Bosnia and Herzegovina in a March 2002 friendly game against Macedonia and has earned a total of 35 caps, scoring three goals. His final international was a November 2009 FIFA World Cup qualification match against Portugal.

== Personal life ==
Bajramović's family is from Vitez, Bosnia and Herzegovina.

== Honours ==
=== Player ===
SC Freiburg

- 2. Bundesliga: 2002–03

Schalke 04

- DFB-Ligapokal: 2005
