= 2020–21 Liechtenstein Cup =

Tournament details
- Country: Liechtenstein
- Teams: 7 (and 8 reserve teams)

Final positions
- Champions: abandoned, no champion

Tournament statistics
- Matches played: 7
- Goals scored: 48 (6.86 per match)

The 2020–21 Liechtenstein Football Cup|Liechtenstein Cup was the 76th edition of Liechtenstein's annual cup competition. Seven clubs competed with a total of 15 teams for one spot in the second qualifying round of the 2021–22 UEFA Europa Conference League. It began on 24 August 2020 and was abandoned in May 2021 due to the COVID-19 pandemic in Liechtenstein.

FC Vaduz defending its 2020 title was interrupted in May 2021 in the Quarter finals when the tournament was concealed due to COVID-19 Pandemic scheduling reasons.

The tournament never played past the Second round on the 23 September 2020.

== Participating clubs ==
**2020–21 Swiss Super League** (1st tier)	**2020–21 1. Liga** (4th tier)	**2020–21 2. Liga** (6th tier)	**2020–21 3. Liga** (7th tier)	**2020–21 4. Liga** (8th tier)	**2020–21 5. Liga** (9th tier)
**FC Vaduz** ^{TH}	**FC Balzers**; **USV Eschen/Mauren**	**FC Ruggell**	USV Eschen/Mauren II; **FC Triesen**; **FC Triesenberg**	**FC Balzers II**; USV Eschen/Mauren III; FC Ruggell II; **FC Schaan**; FC Triesen II	FC Schaan II; FC Triesenberg II; FC Vaduz III

Teams in bold were still active in the competition.

^{TH} Title holders.

== First round ==
The first round involved all except the four highest-placed teams. Five teams received a bye to the second round by drawing of lot. FC Vaduz II did not enter the competition.

Team 1	Score	Team 2
**24 August 2020**
**FC Schaan** (8)	4–4 (a.e.t.) (5–4 p)	USV Eschen/Mauren III (8)
**26 August 2020**
FC Schaan II (9)	0–6	**FC Triesenberg** (7)
**FC Balzers II** (8)	4–1	USV Eschen/Mauren II (7)

== Second round ==
The second round involved all except the four highest-placed teams and the three teams eliminated in the first round.

Team 1	Score	Team 2
**17 September 2020**
FC Ruggell II (8)	2–2 (a.e.t.) (3–4 p)	**FC Triesen** (7)
**18 September 2020**
**FC Schaan** (8)	6–1	FC Triesen II (8)
**22 September 2020**
FC Triesenberg II (9)	0–6	**FC Balzers II** (8)
**23 September 2020**
FC Vaduz III (9)	1–11	**FC Triesenberg** (7)

== Quarter-finals ==
The quarter-finals involved the four teams who won in the second round, as well as the top four highest placed teams (FC Vaduz, FC Balzers, USV Eschen/Mauren and FC Ruggell). The cup competition is canceled due scheduling reasons in May 2021.

Team 1	Score	Team 2
FC Schaan (8)	Canceled	FC Vaduz (1)
FC Triesen (7)	Canceled	FC Balzers (4)
FC Triesenberg (7)	Canceled	USV Eschen/Mauren (4)
FC Balzers II (8)	Canceled	FC Ruggell (6)
