= 2011 UEFA European Under-21 Championship qualification Group 4 =

The teams competing in Group 4 of the 2011 UEFA European Under-21 Championships qualifying competition were Finland, Liechtenstein, Netherlands, Poland and Spain.

== Standings ==
Team	Pld	W	D	L	GF	GA	GD	Pts	(Netherlands)	(Spain)	(Finland)	(Poland)	(Liechtenstein)
Netherlands	8	7	0	1	19	5	+14	21	—	2–1	2–0	3–2	3–0
Spain	8	6	1	1	15	5	+10	19	2–1	—	1–0	2–0	3–1
Finland	8	3	1	4	11	7	+4	10	0–1	1–1	—	2–0	3–0
Poland	8	3	0	5	11	13	−2	9	0–4	0–1	2–1	—	2–0
Liechtenstein	8	0	0	8	1	27	−26	0	0–3	0–4	0–4	0–5	—

== Matches ==
9 June 2009
19:30 CEST

Poland	2–0	Liechtenstein
Korzym 34'; Rybus 56'	Report

Stadion Znicza, Pruszków
Referee: Vusal Aliyev (Azerbaijan)

4 September 2009
19:00 CEST

Spain	2–0	Poland
Joselu 7'; Parejo 58'	Report

Estadio Carlos Tartiere, Oviedo
Referee: Andre Marriner (England)
4 September 2009
19:30 CEST

Netherlands	2–0	Finland
De Jong 15'; Biseswar 75'	Report

Univé Stadion, Emmen
Referee: Ante Vučemilović-Šimunović, Jr. (Croatia)

7 September 2009
19:00 CEST

Liechtenstein	0–4	Spain
	Report	Parejo 15'; Martínez 23'; Capel 82'; Aarón 87'

Rheinpark Stadion, Vaduz
Referee: Karen Nalbandyan (Armenia)
8 September 2009
18:45 CEST

Poland	2–1	Finland
Glik 44'; Grosicki 56'	Report	Pukki 51'

Stadion Dyskobolii, Grodzisk Wielkopolski
Referee: Dragomir Stanković (Serbia)

9 October 2009
18:00 CEST

Liechtenstein	0–5	Poland
	Report	Kielb 43', 80'; Małecki 59', 73'; Sobiech 90+1'

Sportpark Eschen-Mauren, Eschen
Referee: Lasha Silagava (Georgia)
9 October 2009
19:00 CEST

Finland	0–1	Netherlands
	Report	Pieters 24'

Finnair Stadium, Helsinki
Referee: David McKeon (Republic of Ireland)

13 October 2009
17:45 CEST

Poland	0–4	Netherlands
	Report	Van Wolfswinkel 41', 49', 66'; Kuiper 45'

Arena Kielc, Kielce
Referee: Igor Egorov (Russia)
13 October 2009
19:00 CEST

Liechtenstein	0–4	Finland
	Report	Pukki 49'; Hjelm 66', 76'; Kangaskolkka 90+2'

Sportpark Eschen-Mauren, Eschen
Referee: Panayiotis Kailis (Cyprus)

13 November 2009
18:00 CEST

Spain	1–0	Finland
Míchel 79'	Report

El Arcángel, Córdoba
Referee: Levan Paniashvili (Georgia)
13 November 2009
18:30 CEST

Netherlands	3–0	Liechtenstein
De Jong 8'; Falkenburg 68'; John 90+3'	Report

De Vliert, 's-Hertogenbosch
Referee: Pavel Saliy (Kazakhstan)

17 November 2009
19:00 CEST

Netherlands	2–1	Spain
Falkenburg 14'; Wijnaldum 63'	Report	Azpilicueta 80'

Sparta Stadium, Rotterdam
Referee: Manuel Gräfe (Germany)

2 March 2010
19:00 CEST

Spain	3–1	Liechtenstein
Parejo 13'; Adrián 73'; Capel 89' (pen.)	Report	Hanselmann 58'

El Toralín, Ponferrada
Referee: Georgi Yordanov (Bulgaria)
3 March 2010
18:00 CEST

Netherlands	3–2	Poland
Biseswar 57', 71'; De Jong 75'	Report	Cetnarski 22'; Kiełb 82'

De Vijverberg, Doetinchem
Referee: Antonio Damato (Italy)

11 August 2010
19:00 CEST

Finland	1–1	Spain
Kauko 8'	Report	Bojan 31' (pen.)

Arto Tolsa Areena, Kotka
Referee: Mark Steven Whitby (Wales)
11 August 2010
19:00 CEST

Liechtenstein	0–3	Netherlands
	Report	Falkenburg 42'; Toornstra 55'; Dost 78'

Rheinpark Stadion, Vaduz
Referee: Aleksander Gauzer (Kazakhstan)

2 September 2010
20:45 CEST

Spain	2–1	Netherlands
Canales 26'; Capel 54'	Report	Dost 32'

El Collao, Alcoy
Referee: Oliver Drachta (Austria)
3 September 2010
18:00 CEST

Finland	2–0	Poland
Hjelm 26' (pen.); Mannström 73'	Report

Porin Stadion, Pori
Referee: Gediminas Mažeika (Lithuania)

7 September 2010
17:00 CEST

Finland	3–0	Liechtenstein
Pelvas 21'; Pukki 36'; Riski 61'	Report

Sonera Stadium, Helsinki
Referee: Vadims Direktorenko (Latvia)
7 September 2010
17:00 CEST

Poland	0–1	Spain
	Report	Canales 85'

Stadion Dyskobolii, Grodzisk Wielkopolski
Referee: Georgios Daloukas (Greece)

== Goalscorers ==
As of 7 September, there have been 57 goals scored over 20 matches, for an average of 2.85 goals per match.

Goals	Player	Country
3	Jonne Hjelm	Finland
3	Teemu Pukki	Finland
3	Diego Biseswar	Netherlands
3	Siem de Jong	Netherlands
3	Erik Falkenburg	Netherlands
3	Ricky van Wolfswinkel	Netherlands
3	Jacek Kielb	Poland
3	Diego Capel	Spain
3	Dani Parejo	Spain
2	Bas Dost	Netherlands
2	Patryk Małecki	Poland
2	Sergio Canales	Spain

1 goal

Finland
- Aleksei Kangaskolkka
- Joni Kauko
- Sebastian Mannström
- Akseli Pelvas
- Riku Riski

Netherlands
- Joshua John
- Nicky Kuiper
- Erik Pieters
- Georginio Wijnaldum
- Jens Toornstra

Poland
- Mateusz Cetnarski
- Kamil Glik
- Kamil Grosicki
- Maciej Korzym
- Maciej Rybus
- Artur Sobiech

Spain
- Adrián
- César Azpilicueta
- Bojan
- Joselu
- Javi Martínez
- Míchel
- Aarón

Liechtenstein
- Rony Hanselmann
