= Axel Borgmann =

German footballer

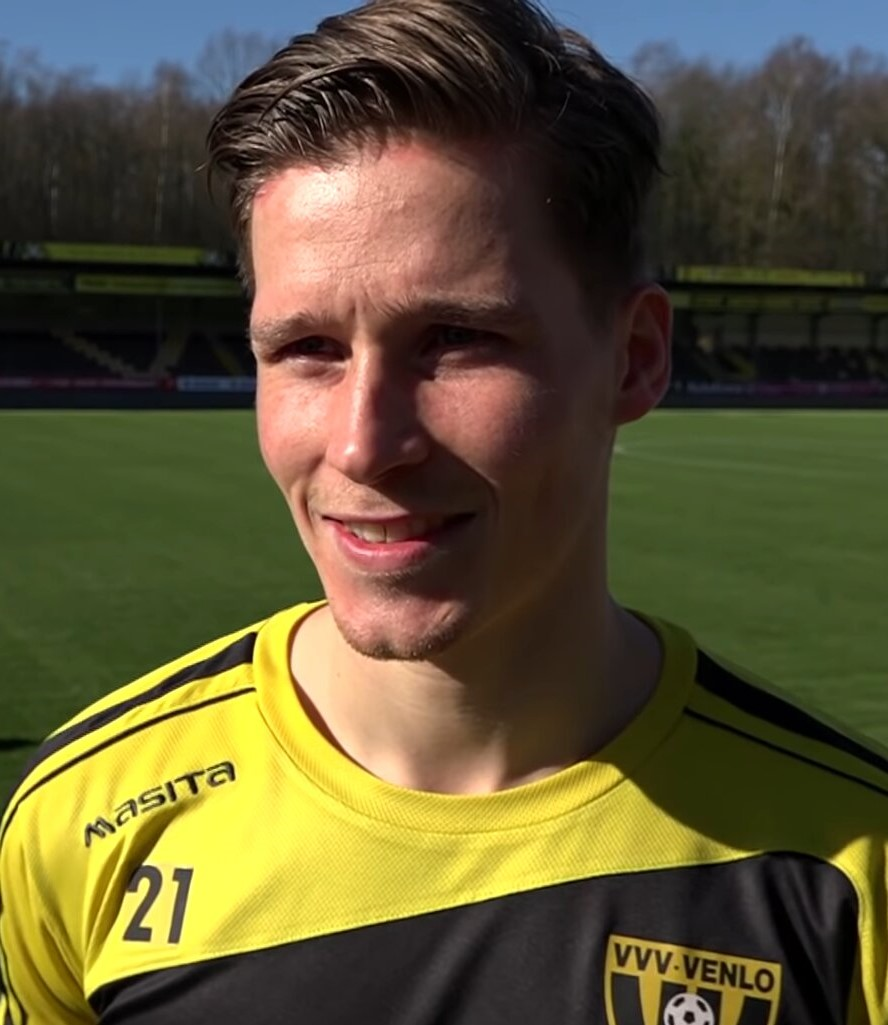
- Borgmann in 2019

Personal information
- Date of birth: 8 July 1994 (age 32)
- Place of birth: Mülheim an der Ruhr, Germany
- Height: 1.78 m (5 ft 10 in)
- Position: Left-back

Team information
- Current team: Energie Cottbus
- Number: 20

Youth career
- 1998–2005: TuSpo Saarn
- 2005–2008: MSV Duisburg
- 2008–2013: Schalke 04

Senior career*
| Years | Team | Apps | (Gls) |
| 2013–2015 | Schalke 04 II | 56 | (2) |
| 2015–2018 | FC Vaduz | 84 | (3) |
| 2018–2019 | VVV-Venlo | 7 | (0) |
| 2019– | Energie Cottbus | 168 | (15) |
- * Club domestic league appearances and goals as of 28 May 2026

Axel Borgmann (born 8 July 1994) is a German professional footballer who plays as a left-back for FC Energie Cottbus.

== Honours ==
Schalke 04

- Under 19 Bundesliga: 2011–12

FC Vaduz

- Liechtenstein Football Cup: 2015–16, 2016–17, 2017–18
