= Philipp Muntwiler =

Swiss footballer (born 1987)

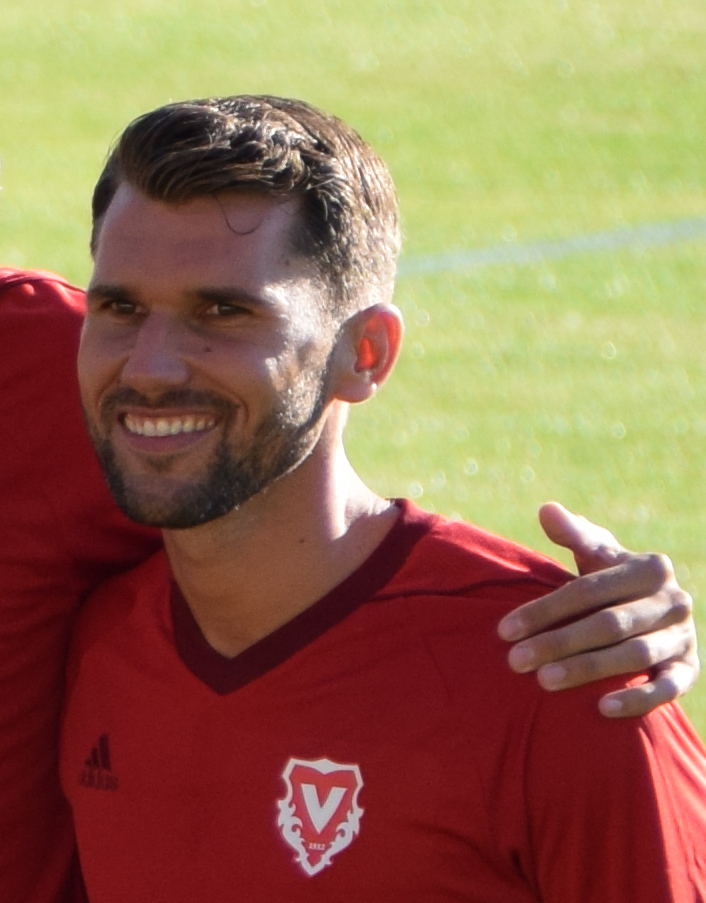

Personal information
- Date of birth: 25 February 1987 (age 39)
- Place of birth: Wil, Switzerland
- Height: 1.83 m (6 ft 0 in)
- Position: Midfielder

Team information
- Current team: Wil (assistant coach)

Senior career*
| Years | Team | Apps | (Gls) |
| 2006–2012 | St. Gallen | 155 | (17) |
| 2012–2014 | Luzern | 32 | (2) |
| 2013–2014 | → Vaduz (loan) | 27 | (2) |
| 2014–2019 | Vaduz | 153 | (20) |
| 2019–2023 | Wil | 135 | (10) |

International career
| 2007 | Switzerland U-21 | 1 | (0) |

Managerial career
- 2024–: Wil (assistant)
- * Club domestic league appearances and goals

Philipp Muntwiler (born 25 February 1987) is a Swiss professional football manager and a former player. He is an assistant manager with FC Wil.

== Career ==
After the time at his youth club FC Bazenheid Philipp Muntwiler moved to the U21 team of the then playing in the Super League FC St. Gallen. After a rather short loan commitment at FC Wil "Munti", as he is called by his fans, managed in the season 2005/06 under coach Ralf Loose the leap into the first team of FC St. Gallen and completed his first three appearances in the Super League.

In the season 2006/07 Muntwiler developed both playful and tactically excellent and was already used in two-thirds of all games (24 of 36 games). However, another infernal highlight came in this year's football: Muntwiler indirectly decided the Swiss football championship on 1 April 2007 by playing against FC Zürich, having been relegated to the field U21 in a match the day before was not eligible to play. However, the sporting department of FC St. Gallen had not turned to the right authority in the determination of whether the player may be used or not. Muntwiler came on in the scoreless game against FCZ about fifteen minutes before the end; In retrospect, the Swiss Football League Disciplinary Commission rated the match as a 3:0 -forfait victory for the Zürich team. The FC Zürich won the championship in a row with a point advantage over FC Basel.

In the season 2007/08, Muntwiler made further progress and secured, then under Rolf Fringer, a regular place in the defensive midfield. With his successor Krassimir Balakov, however, he got off to the Challenge League. However, his involvement in St. Gallen did not detract from that; on the contrary: Muntwiler extended his contract prematurely in autumn 2008 for one year until 30 June 2010. One year after the descent, the FCSG again managed to be top class for two years. In 2011, however, the eastern Swiss rose again.

Muntwiler moved in the summer of 2012 to FC Luzern.

In September 2013, he transferred on loan to FC Vaduz in the Challenge League where he was allowed to celebrate at the end of the 2013/14 season promotion to the Swiss Super League. The FC Vaduz then committed him in the summer of 2014 definitely. He signed a contract for two years until summer 2016 and extended it early by one year until June 2017. In October 2016, he extended his contract prematurely for another year until the summer of 2018.

On 16 November 2023, he announced his retirement from active play at the end of the year. He became the new assistant manager of the team in the new year.

== Honours ==
=== Club ===
FC Vaduz

- Swiss Challenge League (1): 2013–14
- Liechtensteiner Cup (5): 2013–14, 2014–15, 2015–16, 2016-17, 2017-18
