= 2019–20 Liechtenstein Cup =

Tournament details
- Country: Liechtenstein
- Teams: 7 (and 8 reserve teams)

Final positions
- Champions: abandoned, no champion

The 2019–20 Liechtenstein Cup was the 75th season of Liechtenstein's annual cup competition. Seven clubs compete with a total of 15 teams for one spot in the first qualifying round of the 2020–21 UEFA Europa League. FC Vaduz are the defending champions.

On 11 May 2020, the competition was abandoned due to the COVID-19 pandemic in Liechtenstein. The team remaining in the competition with the highest UEFA club coefficient, Vaduz, were selected to play in the 2020–21 UEFA Europa League by the Liechtenstein Football Association, entering the first qualifying round, pending confirmation from UEFA.

== Participating clubs ==
**2019–20 Challenge League** (2nd tier)	**2019–20 1. Liga** (4th tier)	**2019–20 2. Liga** (6th tier)	**2019–20 3. Liga** (7th tier)	**2019–20 4. Liga** (8th tier)	**2019–20 5. Liga** (9th tier)
**FC Vaduz** ^{TH}	**FC Balzers**; **USV Eschen/Mauren**	**FC Ruggell**	USV Eschen/Mauren II; FC Triesen; FC Triesenberg	FC Balzers II; USV Eschen/Mauren III; FC Ruggell II; FC Schaan; FC Triesen II	FC Schaan II; FC Triesenberg II; FC Vaduz III

Teams in bold are still active in the competition.

^{TH} Title holders.

== First round ==
The first round involved all except the four highest-placed teams. Five teams received a bye to the second round by drawing of lot. FC Vaduz II did not enter the competition.

Team 1	Score	Team 2
**27 August 2019**
FC Vaduz III (9)	0–6	**FC Triesen (7)**
**28 August 2019**
FC Triesen II (8)	0–1	**FC Balzers II (8)**
FC Triesenberg II (9)	3–4	**FC Schaan II (9)**

== Second round ==
The second round involved all except the four highest-placed teams and the three teams eliminated in the first round.

Team 1	Score	Team 2
**17 September 2019**
USV Eschen/Mauren III (8)	1–3 (a.e.t.)	**FC Triesenberg** (7)
**FC Schaan** (8)	5–3 (a.e.t.)	USV Eschen/Mauren II (7)
**FC Schaan II** (9)	3–3 (a.e.t.) (4–3 p)	FC Ruggell II (8)
**18 September 2019**
FC Balzers II (8)	2–4	**FC Triesen** (7)

== Quarterfinals ==
The quarterfinals involved the four teams who won in the second round, as well as the top four highest placed teams (FC Vaduz, FC Balzers, USV Eschen/Mauren and FC Ruggell).

Team 1	Score	Team 2
**23 October 2019**
FC Triesenberg (7)	0–5	**FC Ruggell** (6)
**29 October 2019**
FC Triesen (7)	1–3	**FC Vaduz** (2)
FC Schaan II (9)	0–7	**FC Balzers** (4)
**30 October 2019**
FC Schaan (8)	0–3	**USV Eschen/Mauren** (4)

== Semifinals ==
Team 1	Score	Team 2
**11 March**
FC Balzers (4)	1–6	**FC Vaduz** (2)
**7 April**
FC Ruggell (6)	Cancelled	USV Eschen/Mauren (4)

== Final ==
Team 1	Score	Team 2
**6 May**
FC Vaduz (2)	Cancelled	Winner Semi-final 2
