= 1987–88 Liechtenstein Cup =

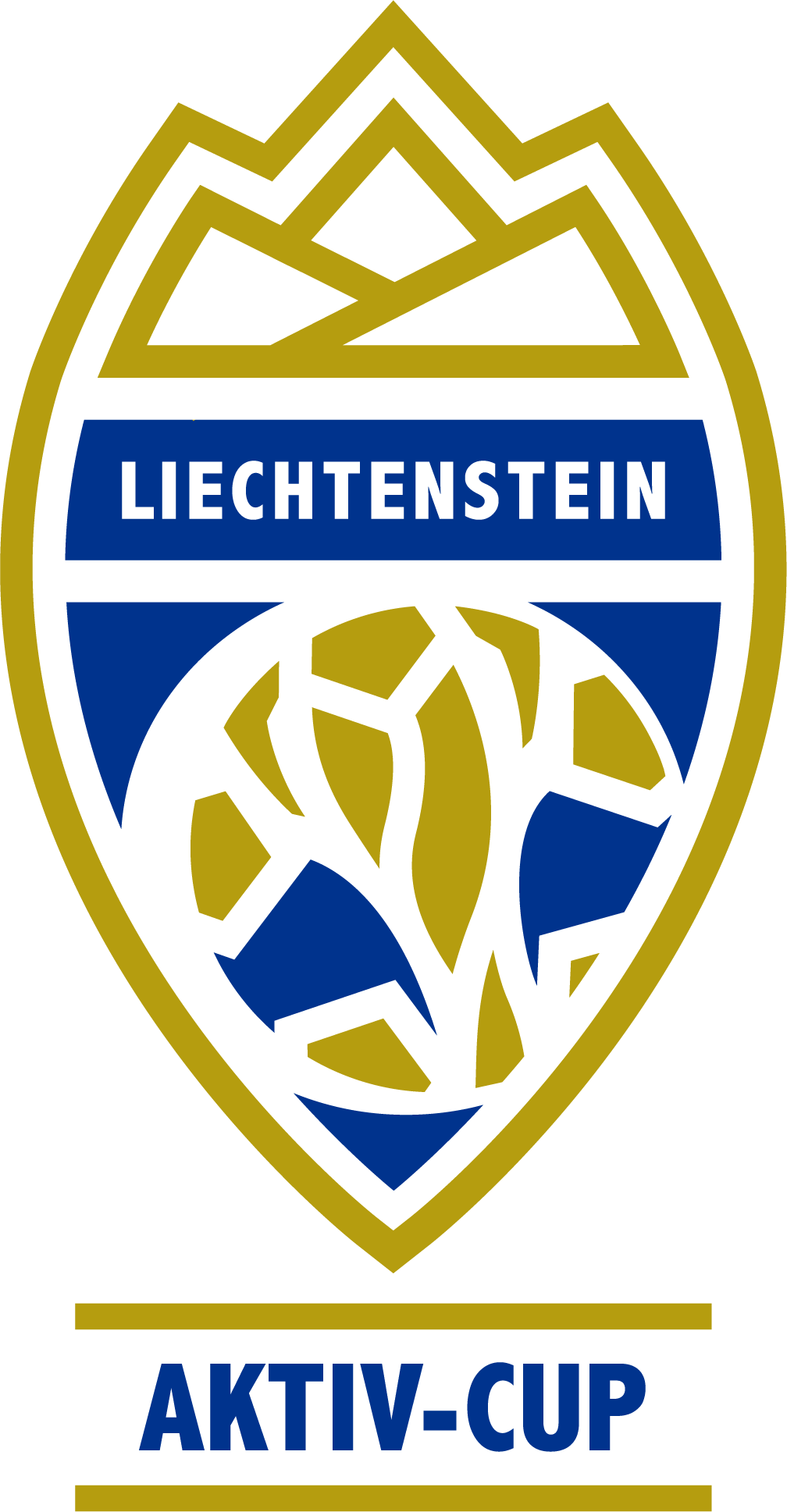
- Liechtensteiner Cup Logo

Tournament details
- Country: Liechtenstein

Final positions
- Champions: FC Vaduz
- Runners-up: USV Eschen/Mauren

The 1987–88 Liechtenstein Cup was the forty-third season of Liechtenstein's annual cup competition. Seven clubs competed with a total of fifteen teams. USV Eschen/Mauren were the defending champions, and FC Vaduz won the competition.

== First round ==
Team 1	Score	Team 2	Penalties
FC Schaan Azzurri	0–9	FC Balzers I	
FC Triesenberg I	5–2	FC Vaduz II	
FC Schaan II	3–4	FC Ruggell I	
FC Triesen II	0–4	FC Schaan I	
USV Eschen/Mauren II	0–1	FC Vaduz I	
FC Balzers II	1–10	FC Triesen I	
FC Triesenberg II	1–1	FC Ruggell II	4–2
USV Eschen/Mauren I	bye		

== Quarterfinals ==
Team 1	Score	Team 2	Penalties
FC Triesenberg I	6–3	FC Triesen I	
FC Ruggell I	2–5	FC Vaduz I	
FC Schaan I	1–5	USV Eschen/Mauren I	
FC Triesenberg II	0–1	FC Balzers I	

== Semifinals ==
Team 1	Score	Team 2	Penalties
FC Balzers I	0–1	FC VaduzFC Vaduz I	
USV Eschen/MaurenUSV Eschen/Mauren I	2–4	FC Triesenberg I	

== Final ==
12 May 1988

FC Vaduz	2–0	USV Eschen/Mauren

Balzers
