= 2016–17 Liechtenstein Cup =

Tournament details
- Country: Liechtenstein
- Teams: 7 (and 9 reserve teams)

Final positions
- Champions: FC Vaduz
- Runners-up: USV Eschen/Mauren

Tournament statistics
- Matches played: 15

The 2016–17 Liechtenstein Cup is the 72nd season of Liechtenstein's annual cup competition. Seven clubs competed with a total of 17 teams for one spot in the first qualifying round of the 2017–18 UEFA Europa League. FC Vaduz are the defending champions.

== Participating clubs ==
2015–16 Super League (1st tier)	2015–16 1. Liga (4th tier)	2015–16 2. Liga (6th tier)	2015–16 3. Liga (7th tier)	2015–16 4. Liga (8th tier)	2015–16 5. Liga (9th tier)
FC Vaduz ^{TH}	FC Balzers; USV Eschen/Mauren	FC Ruggell	FC Balzers II; FC Schaan; FC Triesen	FC Balzers III; USV Eschen/Mauren II; FC Ruggell II; FC Schaan II (Azzurri); FC Triesen II; FC Triesenberg	USV Eschen/Mauren III; FC Schaan III; FC Triesenberg II

^{TH} Title holders.

== First round ==
The first round involved the teams which did not reach the previous season's semifinals. FC Vaduz II (U23) did not enter the competition. Four of them received a bye to the Second round.

Team 1	Score	Team 2
17 August 2016
FC Schaan III (9)	1–4	USV Eschen/Mauren III (9)
23 August 2016
FC Schaan II (Azzurri) (8)	1–2	FC Ruggell II (8)
24 August 2016
USV Eschen/Mauren II (8)	3–0 (a.e.t.)	FC Triesenberg II (9)
7 September 2016
FC Triesen II (8)	1–5	FC Balzers (4)

== Second round ==
The second round involved the four winners of the first round and the four teams which received a bye through to the second round (FC Balzers III, FC Ruggell, FC Triesen, and FC Triesenberg).

Team 1	Score	Team 2
27 September 2016
USV Eschen/Mauren II (8)	0–3	FC Balzers (4)
28 September 2016
FC Balzers III (8)	0–2	FC Ruggell (6)
USV Eschen/Mauren III (9)	0–7	FC Triesenberg (8)
4 October 2016
FC Ruggell II (8)	0–1	FC Triesen (7)

== Quarterfinals ==
The quarterfinals involved the four teams who won in the second round, as well as the semifinalists in the last season (FC Vaduz, USV Eschen/Mauren, FC Balzers II and FC Schaan).

Team 1	Score	Team 2
25 October 2016
FC Balzers (4)	0–4	USV Eschen/Mauren (4)
FC Ruggell (6)	0–11	FC Vaduz (1)
FC Triesenberg (8)	3–1	FC Schaan (7)
26 October 2016
FC Balzers II (7)	0–2	FC Triesen (7)

== Semifinals ==
Team 1	Score	Team 2
5 April 2017
FC Triesenberg (8)	2–4	USV Eschen/Mauren (4)
11 April 2017
FC Triesen (7)	0–18	FC Vaduz (1)

== Final ==
24 May 2017
18:30

USV Eschen/Mauren	1–5	FC Vaduz
Pola 30'		Turkes 1', 26', 51'; Muntwiler 43'; Kukuruzović 56'

Sportpark Eschen-Mauren, Eschen
Attendance: 984
Referee: Sascha Amhof (Switzerland)
