= Foser =

Foser is a German surname.

== Notable people ==
- Maria Foser, Liechtensteiner politician
- Markus Foser (born 1968), Liechtensteiner Olympic alpine skier
- Pascal Foser (born 1992), Liechtensteiner footballer
