= 2015–16 Liechtenstein Cup =

Tournament details
- Country: Liechtenstein
- Teams: 7 (and 10 Reserve teams)

Final positions
- Champions: FC Vaduz
- Runners-up: FC Schaan

Tournament statistics
- Matches played: 16
- Goals scored: 74 (4.63 per match)

The 2015–16 Liechtenstein Cup is the 71st season of Liechtenstein's annual cup competition. Seven clubs competed with a total of 17 teams for one spot in the first qualifying round of the 2016–17 UEFA Europa League. FC Vaduz are the defending champions.

== Participating clubs ==
2015–16 Super League (1st tier)	2015–16 1. Liga (4th tier)	2015–16 2. Liga (6th tier)	2015–16 3. Liga (7th tier)	2015–16 4. Liga (8th tier)	2015–16 5. Liga (9th tier)
FC Vaduz ^{TH}	FC Balzers; USV Eschen/Mauren	FC Triesen; FC Vaduz II (U23)	FC Balzers II; FC Ruggell; FC Schaan; FC Triesenberg	USV Eschen/Mauren II; FC Schaan II (Azzurri); FC Triesen II	FC Balzers III; USV Eschen/Mauren III; FC Ruggell II; FC Schaan III; FC Triesenberg II

^{TH} Title holders.

== First round ==
The First Round involved the 13 teams which didn't qualify for the semifinals in the last season. Three of them received a bye to the Second round.

Team 1	Score	Team 2
25 August 2015
FC Triesen II	1–3	FC Balzers II
FC Balzers III	0–6	FC Schaan
FC Triesenberg II	0–5	USV Eschen/Mauren II
26 August 2015
FC Triesen	1–4	FC Balzers
FC Schaan II (Azzurri)	0–3	FC Ruggell

== Second round ==
The five winners of the First Round, along with the three teams which received a bye in the First round (USV Eschen/Mauren III, FC Ruggell II and FC Schaan III), competed in the Second Round.

Team 1	Score	Team 2
15 September 2015
FC Ruggell II	3–0	USV Eschen/Mauren II
16 September 2015
FC Schaan	4–2 (a.e.t.)	FC Balzers
30 September 2015
USV Eschen/Mauren III	1–4	FC Balzers II
FC Schaan III	0–3	FC Ruggell

== Quarterfinals ==
The four winners of the Second Round, along with the semifinalists in the last season (FC Vaduz, USV Eschen/Mauren, FC Vaduz II (U23) and FC Triesenberg), competed in the quarterfinals.

Team 1	Score	Team 2
27 October 2015
FC Ruggell II	0–6	USV Eschen/Mauren
3 November 2015
FC Ruggell	0–4	FC Vaduz
4 November 2015
FC Balzers II	1–0	FC Vaduz U23
FC Schaan	3–2 (a.e.t.)	FC Triesenberg

== Semifinals ==
Team 1	Score	Team 2
5 April 2016
USV Eschen/Mauren	1–2	FC Vaduz
6 April 2016
FC Balzers II	2–2 (a.e.t.) (3–5 p)	FC Schaan

== Final ==
4 May 2016
18:30

FC Vaduz	11–0	FC Schaan
Caballero 11', 13', 45', 78'; Avdijaj 20'; Borgmann 30'; Messaoud 43'; Sutter 68', 85'; Schürpf 81'; Hasler 90'

Rheinpark Stadion, Vaduz
Attendance: 1,298
Referee: Nikolaj Hänni (Switzerland)
