= Pascal Foser =

Liechtensteiner footballer

Personal information
- Full name: Pascal Foser
- Date of birth: 16 October 1992 (age 34)
- Height: 1.82 m (5 ft 11 1/2 in)
- Position: Defender

Team information
- Current team: FC Triesenberg

Youth career
- 2005–2010: FC Balzers

Senior career*
Years	Team	Apps	(Gls)
2010–2013	FC Balzers	3	(0)
2013–2015	FC Vaduz U-23		
2015–2017	FC Balzers	30	(1)
2017–2024	FC Triesenberg		

International career^{‡}
2012–2014	Liechtenstein U21	8	(0)
2016	Liechtenstein	1	(0)
- * Club domestic league appearances and goals as of 31 May 2025 ‡ National team caps and goals as of 6 June 2016

Pascal Foser (born 16 October 1992) is a former Liechtensteiner footballer who last played for FC Triesenberg.

== International career ==
He was a member of the Liechtenstein national football team, making his debut in a friendly match against Iceland on 6 June 2016. Foser also made eight appearances for the Liechtenstein U21 team between 2012 and 2014.
