= Liechtenstein football clubs in European competitions =

This is a list of participation by football clubs in Liechtenstein in European competitions.

== UEFA Cup/Europa League ==
Season	Team	Round	Opponent	Home	Away	Aggregate
1999–2000	FC Vaduz	Qualifying round	(Norway) Bodø/Glimt	0–1	1–2	1–3
2000–01	FC Vaduz	Qualifying round	(Poland) Amica Wronki	0–3	3–3	3–6
2001–02	FC Vaduz	Qualifying round	(Croatia) Varteks	3–3	1–6	4–9
2002–03	FC Vaduz	Qualifying round	(Scotland) Livingston	1–1	0–0	1–1 (a)
2003–04	FC Vaduz	Qualifying round	(Ukraine) Dnipro Dnipropetrovsk	0–1	0–1	0–2
2004–05	FC Vaduz	First qualifying round	(Republic of Ireland) Longford Town	1–0	3–2	4–2
2004–05	FC Vaduz	Second qualifying round	(Belgium) Beveren	1–3	1–2	2–5
2005–06	FC Vaduz	First qualifying round	(Moldova) Dacia Chișinău	2–0	0–1	2–1
2005–06	FC Vaduz	Second qualifying round	(Turkey) Beşiktaş	0–1	1–5	1–6
2006–07	FC Vaduz	First qualifying round	(Hungary) Újpest	0–1	4–0	4–1
2006–07	FC Vaduz	Second qualifying round	(Switzerland) Basel	2–1	0–1	2–2 (a)
2007–08	FC Vaduz	First qualifying round	(Georgia (country)) Dinamo Tbilisi	0–0	0–2	0–2
2008–09	FC Vaduz	First qualifying round	(Bosnia and Herzegovina) Zrinjski Mostar	1–2	0–3	1–5
2009–10	FC Vaduz	Second qualifying round	(Scotland) Falkirk	0–1	2–0 (aet)	2–1
2009–10	FC Vaduz	Third qualifying round	(Czech Republic) Slovan Liberec	0–1	0–2	0–3
2010–11	FC Vaduz	Second qualifying round	(Denmark) Brøndby	0–0	0–3	0–3
2011–12	FC Vaduz	Second qualifying round	(Serbia) Vojvodina	0–2	3–1	3–3 (a)
2011–12	FC Vaduz	Third qualifying round	(Israel) Hapoel Tel Aviv	2–1	0–4	2–5
2012–13	USV Eschen/Mauren	First qualifying round	(Iceland) FH	1–2	0–1	1–3
2013–14	FC Vaduz	First qualifying round	(Georgia (country)) Chikhura Sachkhere	1–1	0–0	1–1 (a)
2014–15	FC Vaduz	First qualifying round	(Gibraltar) College Europa	3–0	1–0	4–0
2014–15	FC Vaduz	Second qualifying round	(Poland) Ruch Chorzów	0–0	2–3	2–3
2015–16	FC Vaduz	First qualifying round	(San Marino) La Fiorita	5–1	5–0	10–1
2015–16	FC Vaduz	Second qualifying round	(Estonia) Nõmme Kalju	3–1	2–0	5–1
2015–16	FC Vaduz	Third qualifying round	(Switzerland) Thun	2–2	0–0	2–2 (a)
2016–17	FC Vaduz	First qualifying round	(North Macedonia) Sileks	3–1	2–1	5–2
2016–17	FC Vaduz	Second qualifying round	(Denmark) Midtjylland	2–2	0–3	2–5
2017–18	FC Vaduz	First qualifying round	(Wales) Bala Town	3–0	2–1	5–1
2017–18	FC Vaduz	Second qualifying round	(Norway) Odds BK	0–1	0–1	0–2
2018–19	FC Vaduz	First qualifying round	(Bulgaria) Levski Sofia	1–0	2–3	3–3 (a)
2018–19	FC Vaduz	Second qualifying round	(Lithuania) Žalgiris	1–1	0–1	1–2
2019–20	FC Vaduz	First qualifying round	(Iceland) Breiðablik	0–0	2–1	2–1
2019–20	FC Vaduz	Second qualifying round	(Hungary) Fehérvár	0–1	2–0 (aet)	2–1
2019–20	FC Vaduz	Third qualifying round	(Germany) Eintracht Frankfurt	0–5	0–1	0–6
2020–21	FC Vaduz	First qualifying round	(Malta) Hibernians	0–2	—N/a	0–2

== UEFA Conference League ==
Season	Team	Round	Opponent	Home	Away	Aggregate
2021–22	FC Vaduz	Second qualifying round	(Hungary) Újpest	1–2	1–3	2–5
2022–23	FC Vaduz	Second qualifying round	(Slovenia) Koper	1–1 (aet)	1–0	2–1
2022–23	FC Vaduz	Third qualifying round	(Turkey) Konyaspor	1–1	4–2	5–3
2022–23	FC Vaduz	Play-off round	(Austria) Rapid Wien	1–1	1–0	2–1
2022–23	FC Vaduz	Group E	(Netherlands) AZ	1–2	1–4	4th
2022–23	FC Vaduz	Group E	(Cyprus) Apollon Limassol	0–0	0–1	4th
2022–23	FC Vaduz	Group E	(Ukraine) Dnipro-1	1–2	2–2	4th
2023–24	FC Vaduz	First qualifying round	(Belarus) Neman Grodno	1–2	1–1	2–3
2024–25	FC Vaduz	Second qualifying round	(Republic of Ireland) St Patrick's Athletic	2–2	1–3	3–5
2025–26	FC Vaduz	Second qualifying round	(Northern Ireland) Dungannon Swifts	0–1	3–0 (aet)	3–1
2025–26	FC Vaduz	Third qualifying round	(Netherlands) AZ	0–3	0–1	0–4
2026–27	FC Vaduz	Second qualifying round	(Moldova) Atlètic Club d'Escaldes	4–0	2–0	6–0
2026–27	FC Vaduz	Third qualifying round	(Finland) Inter Turku	2–2	1–2	3–4

== Cup Winners' Cup ==
Season	Team	Round	Opponent	Home	Away	Aggregate
1992–93	FC Vaduz	Qualifying round	(Ukraine) Chornomorets Odesa	0–5	1–7	1–12
1993–94	FC Balzers	Qualifying round	(Albania) KS Albpetrol	3–1	0–0	3–1
1993–94	FC Balzers	First round	(Bulgaria) CSKA Sofia	0–8	1–3	1–11
1994–95	FC Schaan	Qualifying round	(Bulgaria) Pirin Blagoevgrad	0–1	0–3	0–4
1995–96	FC Vaduz	Qualifying round	(Czechoslovakia) Hradec Králové	0–5	1–9	1–14
1996–97	FC Vaduz	Qualifying round	(Latvia) Universitate Riga	1–1	1–1	2–2 (4–2 p)
1996–97	FC Vaduz	First round	(France) Paris Saint-Germain	0–4	0–3	0–7
1997–98	FC Balzers	Qualifying round	(Hungary) BVSC Budapest	1–3	0–2	1–5
1998–99	FC Vaduz	Qualifying round	(Sweden) Helsingborg	0–2	0–3	0–5

== Records and statistics ==
=== UEFA Cup/Europa League ===
Team	Matches	W	D	L	GF	GA	+/-
USV Eschen/Mauren	2	0	0	2	1	3	−2
FC Vaduz	67	21	14	32	76	93	−17
Total	69	21	14	34	77	96	−19

=== UEFA Conference League ===
Team	Matches	W	D	L	GF	GA	+/-
FC Vaduz	18	3	7	8	21	29	-8
Total	18	3	7	8	21	29	-8

=== Cup Winners' Cup ===
Team	Matches	W	D	L	GF	GA	+/-
FC Balzers	6	1	1	4	5	17	−12
FC Schaan	2	0	0	2	0	4	−4
FC Vaduz	10	0	2	8	4	40	−36
Total	18	1	3	14	8	61	−53

=== Total ===
Competition	Matches	W	D	L	GF	GA	+/-
UEFA Cup / Europa League	69	21	14	34	77	96	−19
UEFA Europa Conference League	2	0	0	2	2	5	−3
Cup Winners' Cup	18	1	3	14	8	61	−53
Total	89	22	17	50	87	162	−75
