= 2014–15 Liechtenstein Cup =

Tournament details
- Country: Liechtenstein
- Teams: 18

Final positions
- Champions: FC Vaduz
- Runners-up: FC Triesenberg

Tournament statistics
- Matches played: 17
- Goals scored: 59 (3.47 per match)

The 2014–15 Liechtenstein Cup was the 70th season of Liechtenstein's annual cup competition. Seven clubs competed with a total of 18 teams for one spot in the first qualifying round of the 2015–16 UEFA Europa League. FC Vaduz were the defending champions.

== Participating clubs ==
2014–15 Super League (1st tier)	2014–15 1. Liga Classic (4th tier)	2014-15 2. Liga (6th tier)	2014-15 3. Liga (7th tier)	2014-15 4. Liga (8th tier)	2014-15 5. Liga (9th tier)
FC Vaduz ^{TH}	FC Balzers; USV Eschen/Mauren	FC Vaduz II (U23)	FC Balzers II; FC Ruggell; FC Schaan; FC Triesen; FC Triesenberg	FC Balzers III; USV Eschen/Mauren II; FC Triesen II	USV Eschen/Mauren III; FC Ruggell II; FC Schaan II (Azzurri); FC Schaan III; FC Triesenberg II; FC Vaduz III

^{TH} Title holders.

== First round ==
The first round featured the twelve lowest ranked teams not having qualified for the semifinals in the last season. The games will be played on 26 August 2014.

Team 1	Score	Team 2
26 August 2014
FC Balzers II	1–1 (a.e.t.) (4–1 p)	FC Triesen
FC Triesen II	1–7	FC Schaan
27 August 2014
USV Eschen/Mauren III	1–0	FC Triesenberg II
FC Schaan III	0–2	FC Triesenberg
FC Balzers III	0–4	USV Eschen/Mauren II
FC Vaduz III	0–3	FC Ruggell II

== Second round ==
The six winners of the first round, along with the two best ranked teams not having qualified for the semifinals last season (FC Balzers and FC Vaduz II (U23)), competed in the second round.

Team 1	Score	Team 2
30 September 2014
USV Eschen/Mauren II	0–7	FC Balzers
FC Ruggell II	1–3	FC Balzers II
1 October 2014
FC Schaan	1–4	FC Vaduz II (U23)
14 October 2014
USV Eschen/Mauren III	0–1	FC Triesenberg

== Quarterfinals ==
The four winners of the second round, along with the semifinalists in the last season (FC Vaduz, USV Eschen/Mauren, FC Ruggell and FC Schaan II (Azzurri)), competed in the quarterfinals.

Team 1	Score	Team 2
4 November 2014
FC Schaan II (Azzurri)	0–5	USV Eschen/Mauren
5 November 2014
FC Ruggell	1–2 (a.e.t.)	FC Vaduz
31 March 2015
FC Triesenberg	2–0	FC Balzers II
7 April 2015
FC Vaduz II (U23)	3–1	FC Balzers

== Semifinals ==
Team 1	Score	Team 2
21 April 2015
FC Triesenberg	1–0 (a.e.t.)	FC Vaduz II (U23)
USV Eschen/Mauren	0–2	FC Vaduz

== Final ==
13 May 2015
18:30

FC Vaduz	5–0	FC Triesenberg
Abegglen 21'; Muntwiler 26'; Schürpf 29'; Lang 63'; Sara 90'	Report

Sportpark Eschen-Mauren, Eschen
Attendance: 919
Referee: Sascha Amhof (Switzerland)
