= 2017–18 Liechtenstein Cup =

Tournament details
- Country: Liechtenstein
- Teams: 7 (and 9 reserve teams)

Final positions
- Champions: FC Vaduz
- Runners-up: FC Balzers

Tournament statistics
- Matches played: 15

The 2017–18 Liechtenstein Cup was the 73rd season of Liechtenstein's annual cup competition. Seven clubs competed with a total of 16 teams for one spot in the first qualifying round of the 2018–19 UEFA Europa League. FC Vaduz are the defending champions.

== Participating clubs ==
2017–18 Challenge League (2nd tier)	2017–18 1. Liga (4th tier)	2017–18 2. Liga (6th tier)	2017–18 3. Liga (7th tier)	2017–18 4. Liga (8th tier)	2017–18 5. Liga (9th tier)
FC Vaduz ^{TH}	FC Balzers; USV Eschen/Mauren	FC Ruggell	FC Balzers II; FC Schaan; FC Triesen; FC Triesenberg	FC Balzers III; USV Eschen/Mauren II; FC Schaan II (Azzurri); FC Schaan III; FC Triesen II	USV Eschen/Mauren III; FC Ruggell II; FC Triesenberg II

^{TH} Title holders.

== First round ==
The first round involved all except the eight highest-placed teams. The top four teams received a bye to the third round, with the teams ranked 5th to 8th receiving a bye to the second round. FC Vaduz II (U23) did not enter the competition.

Team 1	Score	Team 2
22 August 2017
FC Schaan II (Azzurri) (8)	0–11	FC Triesenberg (7)
FC Ruggell II (9)	1–6	FC Triesen (7)
FC Triesenberg II (9)	1–2	USV Eschen/Mauren II (8)
23 August 2017
FC Schaan III (8)	0–2	FC Balzers II (7)

== Second round ==
The second round involved the four winners of the first round and the four teams which received a bye through to the second round (FC Schaan, FC Balzers III, FC Triesen II and USV Eschen/Mauren III).

Team 1	Score	Team 2
19 September 2017
USV Eschen/Mauren II (8)	2–0	FC Balzers II (7)
20 September 2017
FC Balzers III (8)	5–6 (a.e.t.)	FC Schaan (7)
USV Eschen/Mauren III (9)	4–2	FC Triesen II (8)
4 October 2017
FC Triesen (7)	1–5	FC Triesenberg (7)

== Quarterfinals ==
The quarterfinals involved the four teams who won in the second round, as well as the top four highest placed teams (FC Vaduz, FC Balzers, USV Eschen/Mauren and FC Ruggell).

Team 1	Score	Team 2
24 October 2017
FC Ruggell (6)	1–3	FC Balzers (4)
USV Eschen/Mauren II (8)	0–9	FC Vaduz (2)
25 October 2017
FC Schaan (7)	1–5	USV Eschen/Mauren (4)
USV Eschen/Mauren III (9)	3–1	FC Triesenberg (7)

== Semifinals ==
Team 1	Score	Team 2
10 April 2018
USV Eschen/Mauren (4)	0–2	FC Vaduz (2)
11 April 2018
USV Eschen/Mauren III (9)	1–6	FC Balzers (4)

== Final ==
2 May 2018
18:30

FC Vaduz	3–0	FC Balzers
Göppel 33'; Mathys 44'; Burgmeier 90'

Rheinpark Stadion, Vaduz
Attendance: 675
Referee: Nikolaj Hänni (Switzerland)
