= 2020–21 UEFA Europa League =

50th season of Europe's secondary club football tournament organised by UEFA

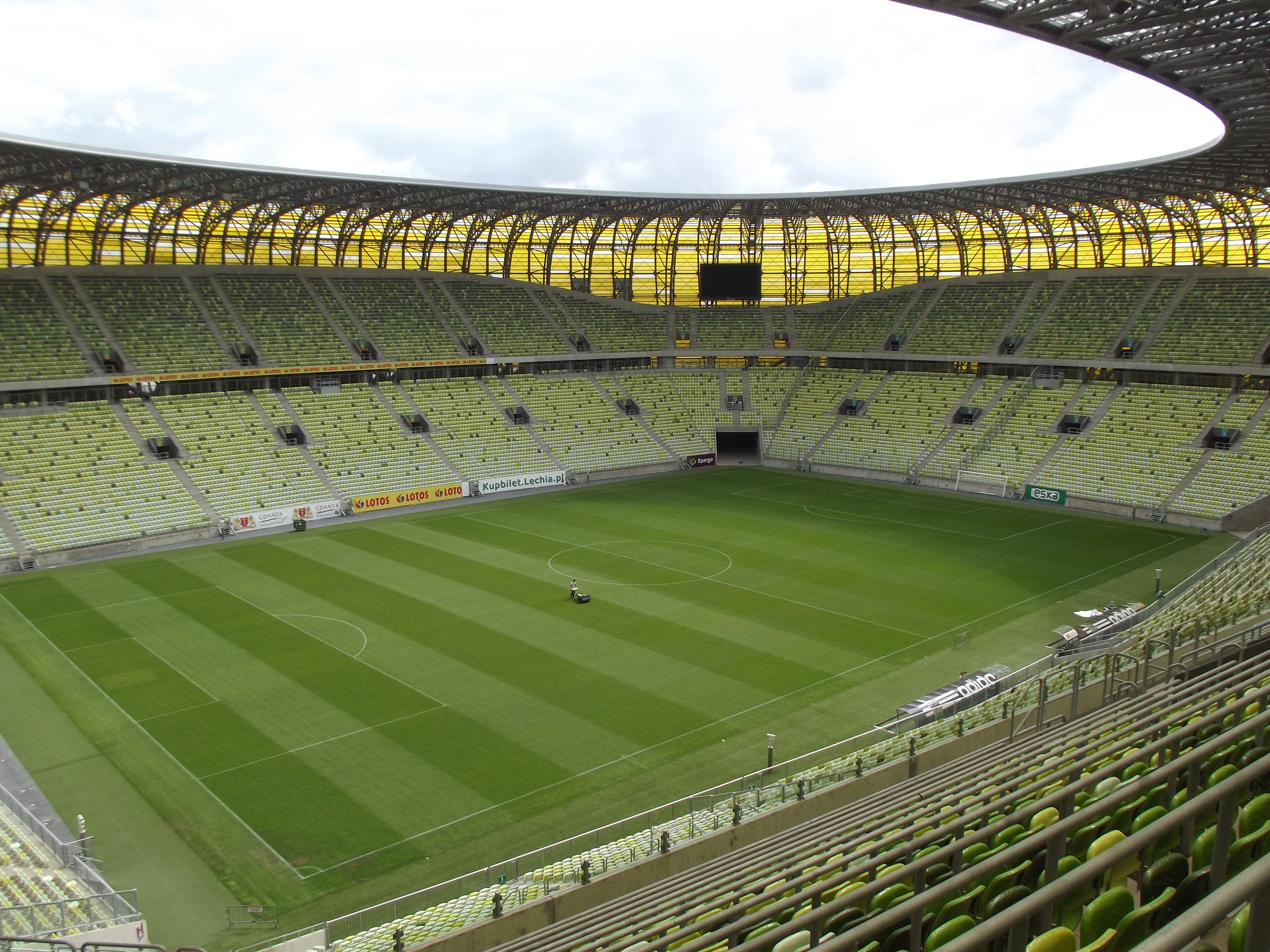
- The Stadion Gdańsk in Gdańsk hosted the final

Tournament details
- Dates: Qualifying: 18 August 2020 – 1 October 2020; Competition proper: 22 October 2020 – 26 May 2021
- Teams: Competition proper: 48+8; Total: 158+55 (from 55 associations)

Final positions
- Champions: (Spain) Villarreal (1st title)
- Runners-up: (England) Manchester United

Tournament statistics
- Matches played: 204
- Goals scored: 618 (3.03 per match)
- Attendance: 108,617 (532 per match)
- Top scorer(s): Pizzi (Benfica); Borja Mayoral (Roma); Gerard Moreno (Villarreal); Yusuf Yazıcı (Lille); 7 goals each
- Best player: Gerard Moreno (Villarreal)

The 2020–21 UEFA Europa League was the 50th season of Europe's secondary club football tournament organised by UEFA, and the 12th season since it was renamed from the UEFA Cup to the UEFA Europa League.

Villarreal defeated Manchester United in the final, played at the Stadion Gdańsk in Gdańsk, Poland, 11–10 on penalties following a 1–1 draw after extra time, winning the competition for the first time in club history. Villarreal thus automatically qualified for the 2021–22 UEFA Champions League group stage and earned the right to play in the 2021 UEFA Super Cup. The stadium was originally appointed to host the 2020 UEFA Europa League final, but this was moved due to the COVID-19 pandemic in Europe in 2020.

As the title holders of the Europa League, Sevilla qualified for the 2020–21 UEFA Champions League, although they had already qualified before the final through their league performance. They were unable to defend their title as they advanced to the Champions League knockout stage, and were eliminated by Borussia Dortmund in the round of 16.

== Association team allocation ==
A total of 213 teams from all 55 UEFA member associations participated in the 2020–21 UEFA Europa League. The association ranking based on the UEFA country coefficients was used to determine the number of participating teams for each association:

- Associations 1–50 (except Liechtenstein) each had three teams qualify.
- Associations 51–55 each had two teams qualify (starting from this season, with association 51 losing one spot and association 55 gaining one spot).
- Liechtenstein had one team qualify (Liechtenstein organised only a domestic cup and no domestic league).
- Moreover, 55 teams eliminated from the 2020–21 UEFA Champions League were transferred to the Europa League (default number was 57, but two fewer teams competed in the 2020–21 UEFA Champions League).

=== Association ranking ===
For the 2020–21 UEFA Europa League, the associations were allocated places according to their 2019 UEFA country coefficients, which took into account their performance in European competitions from 2014–15 to 2018–19.

Apart from the allocation based on the country coefficients, associations could have additional teams participating in the Champions League, as noted below:

- (UCL) – Additional teams transferred from the UEFA Champions League

Association ranking for 2020–21 UEFA Europa League

Rank	Association	Coeff.	Teams	Notes
1	Spain	103.569	3	
2	England	85.462	3	+1 (UCL)
3	Italy	74.725	3	
4	Germany	71.927	3	
5	France	58.498	3	
6	Russia	50.549	3	+2 (UCL)
7	Portugal	48.232	3	+1 (UCL)
8	Belgium	39.900	3	+2 (UCL)
9	Ukraine	38.900	3	+2 (UCL)
10	Turkey	34.600	3	+1 (UCL)
11	Netherlands	32.433	3	+2 (UCL)
12	Austria	31.250	3	+2 (UCL)
13	Czech Republic	28.675	3	+2 (UCL)
14	Greece	27.600	3	+2 (UCL)
15	Croatia	27.375	3	+2 (UCL)
16	Denmark	27.025	3	
17	Switzerland	26.900	3	+1 (UCL)
18	Cyprus	24.925	3	+1 (UCL)
19	Serbia	22.250	3	+1 (UCL)

Rank	Association	Coeff.	Teams	Notes
20	Scotland	22.125	3	+1 (UCL)
21	Belarus	21.875	3	+1 (UCL)
22	Sweden	20.900	3	+1 (UCL)
23	Norway	20.200	3	+1 (UCL)
24	Kazakhstan	19.250	3	+1 (UCL)
25	Poland	19.250	3	+1 (UCL)
26	Azerbaijan	19.000	3	+1 (UCL)
27	Israel	18.625	3	+1 (UCL)
28	Bulgaria	17.500	3	+1 (UCL)
29	Romania	15.950	3	+1 (UCL)
30	Slovakia	15.625	3	+1 (UCL)
31	Slovenia	15.000	3	+1 (UCL)
32	Liechtenstein	13.500	1	
33	Hungary	10.500	3	
34	North Macedonia	8.000	3	+1 (UCL)
35	Moldova	7.750	3	+1 (UCL)
36	Albania	7.500	3	+1 (UCL)
37	Republic of Ireland	7.450	3	+1 (UCL)

Rank	Association	Coeff.	Teams	Notes
38	Finland	7.275	3	+1 (UCL)
39	Iceland	7.250	3	+1 (UCL)
40	Bosnia and Herzegovina	7.125	3	+1 (UCL)
41	Lithuania	6.750	3	+1 (UCL)
42	Latvia	5.625	3	+1 (UCL)
43	Luxembourg	5.500	3	+1 (UCL)
44	Armenia	5.250	3	+1 (UCL)
45	Malta	5.125	3	+1 (UCL)
46	Estonia	5.000	3	+1 (UCL)
47	Georgia	4.750	3	+1 (UCL)
48	Wales	4.125	3	+1 (UCL)
49	Montenegro	4.125	3	+1 (UCL)
50	Faroe Islands	4.000	3	+1 (UCL)
51	Gibraltar	4.000	2	+1 (UCL)
52	Northern Ireland	3.875	2	+1 (UCL)
53	Kosovo	2.500	2	+1 (UCL)
54	Andorra	1.831	2	+1 (UCL)
55	San Marino	0.666	2	+1 (UCL)

=== Distribution ===
The following was the access list for this season.

Access list for 2020–21 UEFA Europa League
		Teams entering in this round	Teams advancing from previous round	Teams transferred from Champions League
Preliminary round (16 teams)		6 domestic cup winners from associations 50–55; 7 domestic league runners-up from associations 49–55; 3 domestic league third-placed teams from associations 48–50		
First qualifying round (94 teams)		25 domestic cup winners from associations 25–49; 30 domestic league runners-up from associations 18–48 (except Liechtenstein); 31 domestic league third-placed teams from associations 16–47 (except Liechtenstein)	8 winners from preliminary round	
Second qualifying round	Champions Path (20 teams)			17 teams eliminated from Champions League first qualifying round; 3 teams eliminated from Champions League preliminary round
Second qualifying round	Main Path (72 teams)	5 domestic cup winners from associations 20–24; 2 domestic league runners-up from associations 16–17; 3 domestic league third-placed teams from associations 13–15; 9 domestic league fourth-placed teams from associations 7–15; 2 domestic league fifth-placed teams from associations 5–6 (League Cup winners for France); 4 domestic league sixth-placed teams from associations 1–4 (League Cup winners for England)	47 winners from first qualifying round	
Third qualifying round	Champions Path (18 teams)		10 winners from second qualifying round (Champions Path)	8 teams eliminated from Champions League second qualifying round (Champions Path)
Third qualifying round	Main Path (52 teams)	6 domestic cup winners from associations 14–19; 6 domestic league third-placed teams from associations 7–12; 1 domestic league fourth-placed team from association 6	36 winners from second qualifying round (Main Path)	3 teams eliminated from Champions League second qualifying round (League Path)
Play-off round	Champions Path (16 teams)		9 winners from third qualifying round (Champions Path)	5 teams eliminated from Champions League third qualifying round (Champions Path); 2 teams eliminated from Champions League second qualifying round (Champions Path)
Play-off round	Main Path (26 teams)		26 winners from third qualifying round (Main Path)	
Group stage (48 teams)		13 domestic cup winners from associations 1–13; 1 domestic league fourth-placed team from association 5; 4 domestic league fifth-placed teams from associations 1–4	8 winners from play-off round (Champions Path); 13 winners from play-off round (Main Path)	4 teams eliminated from Champions League play-off round (Champions Path); 2 teams eliminated from Champions League play-off round (League Path); 3 teams eliminated from Champions League third qualifying round (League Path)
Knockout phase (32 teams)			12 group winners from group stage; 12 group runners-up from group stage	8 third-placed teams from Champions League group stage

Changes were made to the default access list since the Champions League title holders, Bayern Munich, and the Europa League title holders, Sevilla, which were guaranteed berths in the Champions League group stage, already qualified for the Champions League group stage via their domestic leagues, meaning there were fewer teams transferred from the Champions League due to changes in the Champions League access list. However, as a result of schedule delays to both the 2019–20 and 2020–21 European seasons due to the COVID-19 pandemic, the 2020–21 European season started before the conclusion of the 2019–20 European season. Therefore, the changes to the access list that should have been made based on the Champions League and Europa League title holders could not be certain until matches of the earlier qualifying rounds had been played and/or their draws had been made. UEFA used "adaptive re-balancing" to change the access list once the berths for the Champions League and Europa League title holders were determined, and rounds which had already been drawn or played by the time the title holders were determined would not be impacted (Regulations Article 3.07) The following changes were made:

- Since the Champions League title holder berth in the 2020–21 UEFA Champions League group stage was vacated, only five losers of the Champions League third qualifying round (Champions Path), instead of the original six, were transferred to the Europa League play-off round (Champions Path). In this case, two losers of Champions League second qualifying round (Champions Path), determined by draw, received a bye to the play-off round (Champions Path) instead of entering the third qualifying round (Champions Path).
- At the time when the draws for the preliminary round and first qualifying round were held on 9 and 10 August 2020, it was not certain whether the Europa League title holder berth in the 2020–21 UEFA Champions League group stage would be vacated as four of the quarter-finalists of the 2019–20 UEFA Europa League, Wolverhampton Wanderers, Bayer Leverkusen, Copenhagen and Basel, did not qualify for the 2020–21 UEFA Champions League group stage via their domestic leagues. Therefore, these draws proceeded as normal per the default access list, and the matches drawn, which were played on 18–21 and 25–27 August 2020, were not changed even though after the quarter-finals of the 2019–20 UEFA Europa League, which were played on 10–11 August 2020, it was confirmed all four semi-finalists, Sevilla, Manchester United, Inter Milan and Shakhtar Donetsk, already qualified for the 2020–21 UEFA Champions League group stage via their domestic leagues, meaning the Europa League title holder berth would be vacated. As a result, only three losers of the Champions League third qualifying round (League Path), instead of the original four, were transferred to the Europa League group stage, and "adaptive re-balancing" started from the second qualifying round (Main Path), whose draw was held on 31 August 2020, and the following changes to the access list were made:
  - The cup winners of association 13 (Czech Republic), entered the group stage instead of the third qualifying round (Main Path).
  - The cup winners of associations 18 (Cyprus) and 19 (Serbia), entered the third qualifying round (Main Path) instead of the second qualifying round (Main Path).

==== Redistribution rules ====
A Europa League place was vacated when a team qualified for both the Champions League and the Europa League, or qualified for the Europa League by more than one method. When a place was vacated, it was redistributed within the national association by the following rules:

- When the domestic cup winners (considered as the "highest-placed" qualifier within the national association with the latest starting round) also qualified for the Champions League, their Europa League place was vacated. As a result, the highest-placed team in the league which had not yet qualified for European competitions qualified for the Europa League, with the Europa League qualifiers which finished above them in the league moved up one "place".
- When the domestic cup winners also qualified for the Europa League through league position, their place through the league position was vacated. As a result, the highest-placed team in the league which had not yet qualified for European competitions qualified for the Europa League, with the Europa League qualifiers which finished above them in the league moved up one "place" if possible.
- For associations where a Europa League place was reserved for either the League Cup or end-of-season European competition play-offs winners, they always qualified for the Europa League as the "lowest-placed" qualifier. If the League Cup winners had already qualified for European competitions through other methods, this reserved Europa League place was taken by the highest-placed team in the league which had not yet qualified for European competitions.

=== Teams ===
In early April 2020, UEFA announced that due to the COVID-19 pandemic in Europe, the deadline for entering the tournament had been postponed until further notice. UEFA also sent a letter to all member associations that domestic leagues must be completed in full without ending prematurely in order to qualify for European competitions. After meeting with the 55 UEFA associations on 21 April 2020, UEFA strongly recommended them to finish domestic top league and cup competitions, although in some special cases where it was not possible, UEFA developed guidelines concerning participation in its club competitions in case of a cancelled league or cup. After the UEFA Executive Committee meeting on 23 April 2020, UEFA announced that if a domestic competition was prematurely terminated for legitimate reasons in accordance with conditions related to public health or economic problems, the national associations concerned were required to select their participating teams for the 2020–21 UEFA club competitions based on sporting merit in the 2019–20 domestic competitions, and UEFA reserved the right to refuse their admission if UEFA deemed the termination of the competitions not legitimate, or the selection procedure not objective, transparent and non-discriminatory, or the team was perceived by the public as qualifying unfairly. A suspended domestic competition could also be restarted with a different format from the original one in a manner which would still facilitate qualification on sporting merit. All leagues were initially to communicate to UEFA by 25 May 2020 whether they intended to restart their competitions, but this deadline was later extended. On 17 June 2020, UEFA announced that associations had to enter their teams by 3 August 2020. If a cup was abandoned or not completed by the UEFA registration deadline, the Europa League places were distributed by league positions only.

The labels in the parentheses show how each team qualified for the place of its starting round:

- CW: Cup winners
- 2nd, 3rd, 4th, 5th, 6th, etc.: League position of the previous season
- LC: League Cup winners
- RW: Regular season winners
- PW: End-of-season Europa League play-offs winners
- UCL: Transferred from the Champions League
  - GS: Third-placed teams from the group stage
  - CH/LP PO: Losers from the play-off round (Champions/League Path)
  - CH/LP Q3: Losers from the third qualifying round (Champions/League Path)
  - CH/LP Q2: Losers from the second qualifying round (Champions/League Path)
  - Q1: Losers from the first qualifying round
  - PR: Losers from the preliminary round (F: final; SF: semi-finals)
- Abd-: League positions of abandoned season due to the COVID-19 pandemic in Europe as determined by the national association; all teams were subject to approval by UEFA as per the guidelines for entry to European competitions in response to the COVID-19 pandemic

The second qualifying round, third qualifying round and play-off round were divided into Champions Path (CH) and Main Path (MP).

Qualified teams for 2020–21 UEFA Europa League
Entry round		Teams			
R32		(Austria) Red Bull Salzburg (UCL GS)	(Greece) Olympiacos (UCL GS)	(Russia) Krasnodar (UCL GS)	(Ukraine) Dynamo Kyiv (UCL GS)
R32		(Ukraine) Shakhtar Donetsk (UCL GS)	(Netherlands) Ajax (UCL GS)	(Belgium) Club Brugge (UCL GS)	(England) Manchester United (UCL GS)
GS		(Spain) Villarreal (5th)	(Germany) TSG Hoffenheim (6th)	(Turkey) Sivasspor (4th)	(Israel) Maccabi Tel Aviv (UCL CH PO)
GS		(Spain) Real Sociedad (6th/CW)	(France) Lille (Abd-4th)	(Netherlands) Feyenoord (Abd-3rd)	(Belgium) Gent (UCL LP PO)
GS		(England) Arsenal (CW)	(France) Nice (Abd-5th)	(Austria) Wolfsberger AC (3rd)	(Greece) PAOK (UCL LP PO)
GS		(England) Leicester City (5th)	(Russia) CSKA Moscow (4th)	(Czech Republic) Sparta Prague (CW)	(Portugal) Benfica (UCL LP Q3)
GS		(Italy) Napoli (CW)	(Portugal) Braga (3rd)	(Czech Republic) Slavia Prague (UCL CH PO)	(Netherlands) AZ (UCL LP Q3)
GS		(Italy) Roma (5th)	(Belgium) Antwerp (CW)	(Cyprus) Omonia (UCL CH PO)	(Austria) Rapid Wien (UCL LP Q3)
GS		(Germany) Bayer Leverkusen (5th)	(Ukraine) Zorya Luhansk (3rd)	(Norway) Molde (UCL CH PO)	
PO	CH	(Croatia) Dinamo Zagreb (UCL CH Q3)	(Switzerland) Young Boys (UCL CH Q3)	(Serbia) Red Star Belgrade (UCL CH Q3)	(Belarus) Dynamo Brest (UCL CH Q3)
PO	CH	(Azerbaijan) Qarabağ (UCL CH Q3)	(Bulgaria) Ludogorets Razgrad (UCL CH Q2)	(Albania) Tirana (UCL CH Q2)	
Q3	CH	(Scotland) Celtic (UCL CH Q2)	(Poland) Legia Warsaw (UCL CH Q2)	(Romania) CFR Cluj (UCL CH Q2)	(Slovenia) Celje (UCL CH Q2)
Q3	CH	(Moldova) Sheriff Tiraspol (UCL CH Q2)	(Bosnia and Herzegovina) Sarajevo (UCL CH Q2)	(Lithuania) Sūduva (UCL CH Q2)	(Faroe Islands) KÍ (UCL CH Q2)
Q3	MP	(Russia) Rostov (5th)	(Portugal) Sporting CP (4th)	(Belgium) Charleroi (Abd-3rd)	(Ukraine) Desna Chernihiv (4th)
Q3	MP	(Turkey) Alanyaspor (5th)	(Netherlands) PSV Eindhoven (Abd-4th)	(Austria) LASK (4th)	(Greece) AEK Athens (3rd)
Q3	MP	(Croatia) Rijeka (CW)	(Denmark) SønderjyskE (CW)	(Switzerland) St. Gallen (2nd)	(Cyprus) Anorthosis Famagusta (Abd-2nd)
Q3	MP	(Serbia) Vojvodina (CW)	(Turkey) Beşiktaş (UCL LP Q2)	(Czech Republic) Viktoria Plzeň (UCL LP Q2)	(Croatia) Lokomotiva Zagreb (UCL LP Q2)
Q2	CH	(Sweden) Djurgårdens IF (UCL Q1)	(Kazakhstan) Astana (UCL Q1)	(Slovakia) Slovan Bratislava (UCL Q1)	(North Macedonia) Sileks (UCL Q1)
Q2	CH	(Republic of Ireland) Dundalk (UCL Q1)	(Finland) KuPS (UCL Q1)	(Iceland) KR (UCL Q1)	(Latvia) Riga (UCL Q1)
Q2	CH	(Luxembourg) Fola Esch (UCL Q1)	Ararat-Armenia (UCL Q1)	(Malta) Floriana (UCL Q1)	(Estonia) Flora (UCL Q1)
Q2	CH	(Georgia (country)) Dinamo Tbilisi (UCL Q1)	(Wales) Connah's Quay Nomads (UCL Q1)	(Montenegro) Budućnost Podgorica (UCL Q1)	(Gibraltar) Europa (UCL Q1)
Q2	CH	(Northern Ireland) Linfield (UCL Q1)	(Kosovo) Drita (UCL PR F)	(Andorra) Inter Club d'Escaldes (UCL PR SF)	(San Marino) Tre Fiori (UCL PR SF)
Q2	MP	(Spain) Granada (7th)	(England) Tottenham Hotspur (6th)	(Italy) Milan (6th)	(Germany) VfL Wolfsburg (7th)
Q2	MP	(France) Reims (Abd-6th)	(Russia) Dynamo Moscow (6th)	(Portugal) Rio Ave (5th)	(Belgium) Standard Liège (Abd-5th)
Q2	MP	(Ukraine) Kolos Kovalivka (PW)	(Turkey) Galatasaray (6th)	(Netherlands) Willem II (Abd-5th)	(Austria) Hartberg (PW)
Q2	MP	(Czech Republic) Jablonec (4th)	(Czech Republic) Slovan Liberec (PW)	(Greece) Aris (5th)	(Greece) OFI (6th)
Q2	MP	(Croatia) Osijek (4th)	(Croatia) Hajduk Split (5th)	(Denmark) Copenhagen (2nd)	(Switzerland) Basel (3rd)
Q2	MP	(Scotland) Rangers (Abd-2nd)	(Belarus) BATE Borisov (CW)	(Sweden) IFK Göteborg (CW)	(Norway) Viking (CW)
Q2	MP	(Kazakhstan) Kaisar (CW)			
Q1		(Denmark) AGF (PW)	(Switzerland) Servette (4th)	(Cyprus) APOEL (Abd-3rd)	(Cyprus) Apollon Limassol (Abd-4th)
Q1		(Serbia) Partizan (2nd)	(Serbia) TSC (4th)	(Scotland) Motherwell (Abd-3rd)	(Scotland) Aberdeen (Abd-4th)
Q1		(Belarus) Shakhtyor Soligorsk (3rd)	(Belarus) Dinamo Minsk (4th)	(Sweden) Malmö FF (2nd)	(Sweden) Hammarby IF (3rd)
Q1		(Norway) Bodø/Glimt (2nd)	(Norway) Rosenborg (3rd)	(Kazakhstan) Kairat (2nd)	(Kazakhstan) Ordabasy (3rd)
Q1		(Poland) Cracovia (CW)	(Poland) Lech Poznań (2nd)	(Poland) Piast Gliwice (3rd)	(Azerbaijan) Neftçi (Abd-2nd)
Q1		(Azerbaijan) Keşla (Abd-3rd)	(Azerbaijan) Sumgayit (Abd-4th)	(Israel) Hapoel Be'er Sheva (CW)	(Israel) Maccabi Haifa (2nd)
Q1		(Israel) Beitar Jerusalem (3rd)	(Bulgaria) Lokomotiv Plovdiv (CW)	(Bulgaria) CSKA Sofia (2nd)	(Bulgaria) Slavia Sofia (PW)
Q1		(Romania) FCSB (CW)	(Romania) Universitatea Craiova (2nd)	(Romania) Botoșani (4th)	(Slovakia) Žilina (2nd)
Q1		(Slovakia) DAC Dunajská Streda (3rd)	(Slovakia) Ružomberok (PW)	(Slovenia) Mura (CW)	(Slovenia) Maribor (2nd)
Q1		(Slovenia) Olimpija Ljubljana (3rd)	(Liechtenstein) Vaduz (Abd-Cup)	(Hungary) Honvéd (CW)	(Hungary) MOL Fehérvár (2nd)
Q1		(Hungary) Puskás Akadémia (3rd)	(North Macedonia) Shkëndija (Abd-3rd)	(North Macedonia) Renova (Abd-4th)	(North Macedonia) Shkupi (Abd-5th)
Q1		(Moldova) Petrocub Hîncești (CW)	(Moldova) Sfîntul Gheorghe (2nd)	(Moldova) Dinamo-Auto (4th)	(Albania) Teuta (CW)
Q1		(Albania) Kukësi (2nd)	(Albania) Laçi (3rd)	(Republic of Ireland) Shamrock Rovers (CW)	(Republic of Ireland) Bohemians (3rd)
Q1		(Republic of Ireland) Derry City (4th)	(Finland) Ilves (CW)	(Finland) Inter Turku (2nd)	(Finland) Honka (PW)
Q1		(Iceland) Víkingur Reykjavík (CW)	(Iceland) Breiðablik (2nd)	(Iceland) FH (3rd)	(Bosnia and Herzegovina) Željezničar (Abd-2nd)
Q1		(Bosnia and Herzegovina) Zrinjski Mostar (Abd-3rd)	(Bosnia and Herzegovina) Borac Banja Luka (Abd-4th)	(Lithuania) Žalgiris (2nd)	(Lithuania) Riteriai (3rd)
Q1		(Lithuania) Kauno Žalgiris (4th)	(Latvia) RFS (CW)	(Latvia) Ventspils (3rd)	(Latvia) Valmiera (4th)
Q1		(Luxembourg) Progrès Niederkorn (Abd-2nd)	(Luxembourg) Differdange 03 (Abd-3rd)	(Luxembourg) Union Titus Pétange (Abd-4th)	(Armenia) Noah (CW)
Q1		(Armenia) Alashkert (3rd)	(Armenia) Shirak (4th)	(Malta) Valletta (Abd-2nd)	(Malta) Hibernians (Abd-3rd)
Q1		(Malta) Sirens (Abd-4th)	(Estonia) FCI Levadia (2nd)	(Estonia) Nõmme Kalju (3rd)	(Estonia) Paide Linnameeskond (4th)
Q1		(Georgia (country)) Saburtalo Tbilisi (CW)	(Georgia (country)) Dinamo Batumi (2nd)	(Georgia (country)) Locomotive Tbilisi (4th)	(Wales) The New Saints (Abd-2nd)
Q1		(Wales) Bala Town (Abd-3rd)	(Montenegro) Sutjeska (Abd-2nd)		
PR		(Wales) Barry Town United (Abd-4th)	(Montenegro) Iskra (Abd-3rd)	(Montenegro) Zeta (Abd-4th)	(Faroe Islands) HB (CW)
PR		(Faroe Islands) B36 (2nd)	(Faroe Islands) NSÍ (3rd)	(Gibraltar) St Joseph's (Abd-2nd)	(Gibraltar) Lincoln Red Imps (Abd-3rd)
PR		(Northern Ireland) Glentoran (CW)	(Northern Ireland) Coleraine (Abd-2nd)	(Kosovo) Prishtina (CW)	(Kosovo) Gjilani (2nd)
PR		(Andorra) FC Santa Coloma (2nd)	(Andorra) Engordany (3rd)	(San Marino) Tre Penne (Abd-3rd)	(San Marino) La Fiorita (Abd-4th)

Notes

1. Champions Path (CH): Tirana and Ludogorets Razgrad, two of the ten losers of 2020–21 UEFA Champions League second qualifying round (Champions Path), were determined by a draw held on 31 August 2020 after the Europa League second qualifying round draw, to receive a bye to the play-off round.
2. Azerbaijan (AZE): The 2019–20 Azerbaijan Premier League and the 2019–20 Azerbaijan Cup were abandoned due to the COVID-19 pandemic in Azerbaijan. The second-placed, third-placed and fourth-placed teams of the league at the time of the abandonment, Neftçi, Keşla and Sumgayit, were selected to play in the 2020–21 UEFA Europa League by the Association of Football Federations of Azerbaijan, entering the first qualifying round.
3. Belgium (BEL): The 2019–20 Belgian First Division A was abandoned due to the COVID-19 pandemic in Belgium. The third-placed and fifth-placed teams of the league at the time of the abandonment, Charleroi and Standard Liège, were selected to play in the 2020–21 UEFA Europa League by the Royal Belgian Football Association, entering the third qualifying round and second qualifying round respectively.
4. Bosnia and Herzegovina (BIH): The 2019–20 Premier League of Bosnia and Herzegovina and the 2019–20 Bosnia and Herzegovina Football Cup were abandoned due to the COVID-19 pandemic in Bosnia and Herzegovina. The second-placed, third-placed and fourth-placed teams of the league at the time of the abandonment, Željezničar, Zrinjski Mostar and Borac Banja Luka, were selected to play in the 2020–21 UEFA Europa League by the Football Association of Bosnia and Herzegovina, entering the first qualifying round.
5. Cyprus (CYP): The 2019–20 Cypriot First Division and the 2019–20 Cypriot Cup were abandoned due to the COVID-19 pandemic in Cyprus. The second-placed, third-placed and fourth-placed teams of the league at the time of the abandonment, Anorthosis Famagusta, APOEL and Apollon Limassol, were selected to play in the 2020–21 UEFA Europa League by the Cyprus Football Association, entering the third qualifying round (second-placed team) and first qualifying round respectively.
6. France (FRA): The 2019–20 Ligue 1 was abandoned due to the COVID-19 pandemic in France. The fourth-placed, fifth-placed and sixth-placed teams of the league at the time of the abandonment based on the average number of points per matches played for each team, Lille, Nice and Reims, were selected to play in the 2020–21 UEFA Europa League by the French Football Federation, entering the group stage and second qualifying round (sixth-placed team) respectively.
7. Gibraltar (GIB): The 2019–20 Gibraltar National League and the 2020 Rock Cup were abandoned due to the COVID-19 pandemic in Gibraltar. The second-placed and third-placed teams of the league at the time of the abandonment, St Joseph's and Lincoln Red Imps, were selected to play in the 2020–21 UEFA Europa League by the Gibraltar Football Association, entering the preliminary round.
8. Greece (GRE):
  - The 2019–20 Greek Football Cup was not completed by the UEFA registration deadline. However, since both finalists, Olympiacos and AEK Athens, were in the top three of the 2019–20 Super League Greece, the result of the final would have no impact on qualification for the 2020–21 UEFA Europa League.
  - Panathinaikos, the fourth-placed team of the 2019–20 Super League Greece, would have qualified for the 2020–21 UEFA Europa League second qualifying round, but were banned from UEFA club competitions for the first season they would qualify between the 2018–19 and 2020–21 seasons by the UEFA Club Financial Control Body on 24 April 2018 due to overdue payables, which turned out to be the 2020–21 season since they did not qualify for either the 2018–19 or 2019–20 season. As a result, OFI, the sixth-placed team, qualified for this berth.
9. Liechtenstein (LIE): The 2019–20 Liechtenstein Cup was abandoned due to the COVID-19 pandemic in Liechtenstein. The team remaining in the cup with the highest UEFA club coefficient, Vaduz, were selected to play in the 2020–21 UEFA Europa League by the Liechtenstein Football Association, entering the first qualifying round.
10. Luxembourg (LUX): The 2019–20 Luxembourg National Division and the 2019–20 Luxembourg Cup were abandoned due to the COVID-19 pandemic in Luxembourg. The second-placed, third-placed and fourth-placed teams of the league at the time of the abandonment, Progrès Niederkorn, Differdange 03 and Union Titus Pétange, were selected to play in the 2020–21 UEFA Europa League by the Luxembourg Football Federation, entering the first qualifying round.
11. Malta (MLT): The 2019–20 Maltese Premier League and the 2019–20 Maltese FA Trophy were abandoned due to the COVID-19 pandemic in Malta. The second-placed, third-placed and fourth-placed teams of the league at the time of the abandonment, Valletta, Hibernians and Sirens, were selected to play in the 2020–21 UEFA Europa League by the Malta Football Association, entering the first qualifying round.
12. Montenegro (MNE): The 2019–20 Montenegrin First League and the 2019–20 Montenegrin Cup were abandoned due to the COVID-19 pandemic in Montenegro. The second-placed, third-placed and fourth-placed teams of the league at the time of the abandonment, Sutjeska, Iskra and Zeta, were selected to play in the 2020–21 UEFA Europa League by the Football Association of Montenegro, entering the first qualifying round (second-placed team) and preliminary round respectively.
13. Netherlands (NED): The 2019–20 Eredivisie and the 2019–20 KNVB Cup were abandoned due to the COVID-19 pandemic in the Netherlands. The third-placed, fourth-placed and fifth-placed teams of the league at the time of the abandonment, Feyenoord, PSV Eindhoven and Willem II, were selected to play in the 2020–21 UEFA Europa League by the Royal Dutch Football Association, entering the group stage, third qualifying round and second qualifying round respectively.
14. North Macedonia (MKD): The 2019–20 Macedonian First Football League and the 2019–20 Macedonian Football Cup were abandoned due to the COVID-19 pandemic in North Macedonia. The third-placed, fourth-placed and fifth-placed teams of the league at the time of the abandonment, Shkëndija, Renova and Shkupi, were selected to play in the 2020–21 UEFA Europa League by the Football Federation of North Macedonia, entering the first qualifying round, as the second-placed team, Sileks, were selected to play in the 2020–21 UEFA Champions League to replace the top team, Vardar, who failed to obtain a UEFA licence.
15. Northern Ireland (NIR): The 2019–20 NIFL Premiership was abandoned due to the COVID-19 pandemic in Northern Ireland. The second-placed team of the league at the time of the abandonement, Coleraine, were selected to play in the 2020–21 UEFA Europa League by the Irish Football Association, entering the preliminary round.
16. Republic of Ireland (IRL): Derry City are a club based in Northern Ireland but play in the Republic of Ireland's league system, and qualify for the Europa League through one of the berths for the Republic of Ireland.
17. Romania (ROU): Astra Giurgiu, the third-placed team of the 2019–20 Liga I, would have qualified for the 2020–21 UEFA Europa League first qualifying round, but failed to obtain a UEFA licence. As a result, Botoșani, the fourth-placed team, qualified for this berth.
18. San Marino (SMR): The 2019–20 Campionato Sammarinese di Calcio and the 2019–20 Coppa Titano were abandoned due to the COVID-19 pandemic in San Marino. The second-placed and third-placed teams of the league at the time of the abandonment, Folgore and Tre Penne, were originally selected to play in the 2020–21 UEFA Europa League by the San Marino Football Federation, entering the preliminary round. However, Folgore were banned by UEFA due to previous match-fixing, and were replaced by the fourth-placed team, La Fiorita.
19. Scotland (SCO): The 2019–20 Scottish Premiership was abandoned and the 2019–20 Scottish Cup was not completed by the UEFA registration deadline due to the COVID-19 pandemic in Scotland. The second-placed, third-placed and fourth-placed teams of the league at the time of the abandonment based on the average number of points per matches played for each team, Rangers, Motherwell and Aberdeen, were selected to play in the 2020–21 UEFA Europa League by the Scottish Football Association, entering the second qualifying round (second-placed team) and first qualifying round respectively.
20. Spain (ESP): The 2019–20 Copa del Rey was not completed by the UEFA registration deadline due to the COVID-19 pandemic in Spain. As a result, the seventh-placed team of the 2019–20 La Liga was selected to play in the 2020–21 UEFA Europa League by the Royal Spanish Football Federation, entering the second qualifying round, and the sixth-placed team of the league entered the group stage. The 2019–20 Copa del Rey was ultimately won by Real Sociedad, who entered the group stage as sixth-placed team, in 2021.
21. Switzerland (SUI): The 2019–20 Swiss Cup was not completed by the UEFA registration deadline due to the COVID-19 pandemic in Switzerland. As a result, the fourth-placed team of the 2019–20 Swiss Super League was selected to play in the 2020–21 UEFA Europa League by the Swiss Football Association, entering the first qualifying round, and the second-placed and third-placed teams of the league entered the third qualifying round and second qualifying round respectively.
22. Turkey (TUR): Trabzonspor, the second-placed team of the 2019–20 Süper Lig, would have qualified for the 2020–21 UEFA Champions League second qualifying round, but were banned from all UEFA club competitions for the 2020–21 season by the UEFA Club Financial Control Body on 3 June 2020 due to breaches of the UEFA Financial Fair Play Regulations. Trabzonspor appealed the decision to the Court of Arbitration for Sport, but on 30 July 2020, it was announced that the ban on them participating in UEFA club competitions was upheld. As a result, Beşiktaş, the third-placed team, qualified for this berth instead of entering the Europa League group stage, Sivasspor, the fourth-placed team, entered the Europa League group stage instead of the third qualifying round, Alanyaspor, the fifth-placed team, entered the third qualifying round instead of the second qualifying round, and Galatasaray, the sixth-placed team, qualified for the 2020–21 UEFA Europa League second qualifying round.
23. Wales (WAL): The 2019–20 Cymru Premier and the 2019–20 Welsh Cup were abandoned due to the COVID-19 pandemic in Wales. The second-placed, third-placed and fourth-placed teams of the league at the time of the abandonment based on the average number of points per matches played for each team, The New Saints, Bala Town and Barry Town United, were selected to play in the 2020–21 UEFA Europa League by the Football Association of Wales, entering the first qualifying round and preliminary round (fourth-placed team) respectively.

== Round and draw dates ==
The schedule of the competition was as follows (all draws were held at the UEFA headquarters in Nyon, Switzerland). The tournament would originally have started in June 2020, but was delayed to August due to the COVID-19 pandemic in Europe. The new schedule was announced by the UEFA Executive Committee on 17 June 2020. All qualifying matches, including the play-off round, were played as single leg matches, hosted by one of the teams decided by draw. Matches were typically played on Thursdays, but could also be played on Tuesdays or Wednesdays if there were scheduling conflicts.

The group stage draw was originally to be held at the Stavros Niarchos Foundation Cultural Center in Athens, Greece, but UEFA announced on 9 September 2020 that it would be relocated to Nyon.

Schedule for 2020–21 UEFA Europa League
Phase	Round	Draw date	First leg	Second leg
Qualifying	Preliminary round	9 August 2020	20 August 2020	
Qualifying	First qualifying round	10 August 2020	27 August 2020	
Qualifying	Second qualifying round	31 August 2020	17 September 2020	
Qualifying	Third qualifying round	1 September 2020	24 September 2020	
Play-off	Play-off round	18 September 2020	1 October 2020	
Group stage	Matchday 1	2 October 2020	22 October 2020	
Group stage	Matchday 2	2 October 2020	29 October 2020	
Group stage	Matchday 3	2 October 2020	5 November 2020	
Group stage	Matchday 4	2 October 2020	26 November 2020	
Group stage	Matchday 5	2 October 2020	3 December 2020	
Group stage	Matchday 6	2 October 2020	10 December 2020	
Knockout phase	Round of 32	14 December 2020	18 February 2021	25 February 2021
Knockout phase	Round of 16	26 February 2021	11 March 2021	18 March 2021
Knockout phase	Quarter-finals	19 March 2021	8 April 2021	15 April 2021
Knockout phase	Semi-finals	19 March 2021	29 April 2021	6 May 2021
Knockout phase	Final	19 March 2021	26 May 2021 at Stadion Gdańsk, Gdańsk	

The original schedule of the competition, as planned before the pandemic, was as follows (all draws were to be held at the UEFA headquarters in Nyon, Switzerland, unless stated otherwise).

Original schedule for 2020–21 UEFA Europa League
Phase	Round	Draw date	First leg	Second leg
Qualifying	Preliminary round	9 June 2020	25 June 2020	2 July 2020
Qualifying	First qualifying round	16 June 2020	9 July 2020	16 July 2020
Qualifying	Second qualifying round	17 June 2020	23 July 2020	30 July 2020
Qualifying	Third qualifying round	20 July 2020	6 August 2020	13 August 2020
Play-off	Play-off round	3 August 2020	20 August 2020	27 August 2020
Group stage	Matchday 1	28 August 2020 (Monaco)	17 September 2020	
Group stage	Matchday 2	28 August 2020 (Monaco)	1 October 2020	
Group stage	Matchday 3	28 August 2020 (Monaco)	22 October 2020	
Group stage	Matchday 4	28 August 2020 (Monaco)	5 November 2020	
Group stage	Matchday 5	28 August 2020 (Monaco)	26 November 2020	
Group stage	Matchday 6	28 August 2020 (Monaco)	10 December 2020	
Knockout phase	Round of 32	14 December 2020	18 February 2021	25 February 2021
Knockout phase	Round of 16	26 February 2021	11 March 2021	18 March 2021
Knockout phase	Quarter-finals	19 March 2021	8 April 2021	15 April 2021
Knockout phase	Semi-finals	19 March 2021	29 April 2021	6 May 2021
Knockout phase	Final	19 March 2021	26 May 2021 at Estadio Ramón Sánchez-Pizjuán, Seville	

== Effects of the COVID-19 pandemic ==
Due to the COVID-19 pandemic in Europe, the following special rules were applicable to the competition:

- If there were travel restrictions related to the COVID-19 pandemic that prevented the away team from entering the home team's country or returning to their own country, the match could be played at a neutral country or the away team's country that allowed the match to take place.
- If a team refused to play or was considered responsible for a match not taking place, they were considered to have forfeited the match. If both teams refused to play or were considered responsible for a match not taking place, both teams were disqualified.
- If a team had players and/or officials tested positive for SARS-2 coronavirus preventing them from playing the match before the deadline set by UEFA, they were considered to have forfeited the match.

On 24 September 2020, UEFA announced that five substitutions would be permitted from the group stage onward, with a sixth allowed in extra time. However, each team was only given three opportunities to make substitutions during matches, with a fourth opportunity in extra time, excluding substitutions made at half-time, before the start of extra time and at half-time in extra time. Consequently, a maximum of twelve players could be listed on the substitute bench.

All qualifying matches were played behind closed doors. Following the partial return of fans at the 2020 UEFA Super Cup, UEFA announced on 1 October 2020 that matches from the group stage onward could be played at 30% capacity if allowed by the local authorities. Video assistant referees were not introduced for the group stage as planned (now to start in 2021–22), but were still used in the knockout phase.

== Qualifying rounds ==
=== Preliminary round ===
The draw for the preliminary round was held on 9 August 2020, 13:00 CEST. The matches were played on 18, 20 and 21 August 2020. The match between Lincoln Red Imps and Prishtina on 18 August was postponed due to the whole Prishtina team being put into quarantine after eight players had tested positive for SARS-2 coronavirus. The game was rescheduled to 22 August, with Prishtina using UEFA regulations to sign on emergency loan players from rival Kosovar Superleague clubs Feronikel, Llapi, Trepca '89, Flamurtar, Ballkani, Drenica and Vushtrria in order to fulfil the fixture. However the rearranged fixture also had to be cancelled after 7 more players tested positive for coronavirus, and Lincoln Red Imps were awarded a technical 3–0 win by UEFA.

Home team	Score	Away team
Tre Penne (San Marino)	1–3	(Kosovo) Gjilani
Lincoln Red Imps (Gibraltar)	3–0 (Note: Lincoln Red Imps were awarded a 3–0 win after the match was cancelled due to Prishtina players testing positive for SARS-CoV-2.)	(Kosovo) Prishtina
FC Santa Coloma (Andorra)	0–0 (a.e.t.) (3–4 p)	(Montenegro) Iskra
Engordany (Andorra)	1–3	(Montenegro) Zeta
Glentoran (Northern Ireland)	1–0	(Faroe Islands) HB
St Joseph's (Gibraltar)	1–2	(Faroe Islands) B36
Coleraine (Northern Ireland)	1–0	(San Marino) La Fiorita
NSÍ (Faroe Islands)	5–1	(Wales) Barry Town United

=== First qualifying round ===
The draw for the first qualifying round was held on 10 August 2020, 13:00 CEST. Most matches were played on 25, 26 and 27 August 2020, however two matches were postponed to 9 and 10 September 2020.

Home team	Score	Away team
Maribor (Slovenia)	1–1 (a.e.t.) (4–5 p)	(Northern Ireland) Coleraine
Olimpija Ljubljana (Slovenia)	2–1 (a.e.t.)	(Iceland) Víkingur Reykjavík
B36 (Faroe Islands)	4–3 (a.e.t.)	(Estonia) FCI Levadia
Riteriai (Lithuania)	3–2 (a.e.t.)	(Republic of Ireland) Derry City
Žalgiris (Lithuania)	2–0	(Estonia) Paide Linnameeskond
Honvéd (Hungary)	2–1 (a.e.t.)	(Finland) Inter Turku
Zrinjski Mostar (Bosnia and Herzegovina)	3–0	(Luxembourg) Differdange 03
Valletta (Malta)	0–1	(Wales) Bala Town
Lincoln Red Imps (Gibraltar)	2–0	(Luxembourg) Union Titus Pétange
Rosenborg (Norway)	4–2	(Iceland) Breiðablik
Aberdeen (Scotland)	6–0	(Faroe Islands) NSÍ
Motherwell (Scotland)	5–1	(Northern Ireland) Glentoran
Hammarby IF (Sweden)	3–0	(Hungary) Puskás Akadémia
Malmö FF (Sweden)	2–0	(Poland) Cracovia
Kukësi (Albania)	2–1	(Bulgaria) Slavia Sofia
Ventspils (Latvia)	2–1	(Moldova) Dinamo-Auto
Shakhtyor Soligorsk (Belarus)	0–0 (a.e.t.) (1–4 p)	(Moldova) Sfîntul Gheorghe
Dinamo Minsk (Belarus)	0–2	(Poland) Piast Gliwice
AGF (Denmark)	5–2	(Finland) Honka
Shamrock Rovers (Republic of Ireland)	2–2 (a.e.t.) (12–11 p)	(Finland) Ilves
FH (Iceland)	0–2	(Slovakia) DAC Dunajská Streda
The New Saints (Wales)	3–1 (a.e.t.)	(Slovakia) Žilina
Vaduz (Liechtenstein)	0–2	(Malta) Hibernians
Servette (Switzerland)	3–0	(Slovakia) Ružomberok
Neftçi (Azerbaijan)	2–1	(North Macedonia) Shkupi
Keşla (Azerbaijan)	0–0 (a.e.t.) (4–5 p)	(Albania) Laçi
Hapoel Be'er Sheva (Israel)	3–0	(Georgia (country)) Dinamo Batumi
Nõmme Kalju (Estonia)	0–4	(Slovenia) Mura
Bodø/Glimt (Norway)	6–1	(Lithuania) Kauno Žalgiris
MOL Fehérvár (Hungary)	1–1 (a.e.t.) (4–2 p)	(Republic of Ireland) Bohemians
Apollon Limassol (Cyprus)	5–1	(Georgia (country)) Saburtalo Tbilisi
Maccabi Haifa (Israel)	3–1	(Bosnia and Herzegovina) Željezničar
Alashkert (Armenia)	0–1	(North Macedonia) Renova
Partizan (Serbia)	1–0	(Latvia) RFS
Lech Poznań (Poland)	3–0	(Latvia) Valmiera
Ordabasy (Kazakhstan)	1–2	(Romania) Botoșani
FCSB (Romania)	3–0	(Armenia) Shirak
Progrès Niederkorn (Luxembourg)	3–0	(Montenegro) Zeta
CSKA Sofia (Bulgaria)	2–1	(Malta) Sirens
Petrocub Hîncești (Moldova)	0–2	(Serbia) TSC
Sumgayit (Azerbaijan)	0–2	(North Macedonia) Shkëndija
Kairat (Kazakhstan)	4–1	(Armenia) Noah
Locomotive Tbilisi (Georgia (country))	2–1	(Romania) Universitatea Craiova
Teuta (Albania)	2–0	(Israel) Beitar Jerusalem
Borac Banja Luka (Bosnia and Herzegovina)	1–0	(Montenegro) Sutjeska
Iskra (Montenegro)	0–1	(Bulgaria) Lokomotiv Plovdiv
Gjilani (Kosovo)	0–2 (a.e.t.)	(Cyprus) APOEL

=== Second qualifying round ===
The draw for the second qualifying round was held on 31 August 2020, 13:00 CEST. The matches were played on 16, 17 and 18 September 2020.

Second qualifying round
Home team	Score	Away team
Champions Path
Inter Club d'Escaldes (Andorra)	0–1	(Republic of Ireland) Dundalk
KuPS (Finland)	1–1 (a.e.t.) (4–3 p)	(Slovakia) Slovan Bratislava
Linfield (Northern Ireland)	0–1	(Malta) Floriana
Riga (Latvia)	1–0	(San Marino) Tre Fiori
Djurgårdens IF (Sweden)	2–1	(Gibraltar) Europa
Flora (Estonia)	2–1	(Iceland) KR
Sileks (North Macedonia)	0–2	(Kosovo) Drita
Astana (Kazakhstan)	0–1	(Montenegro) Budućnost Podgorica
Ararat-Armenia	4–3 (a.e.t.)	(Luxembourg) Fola Esch
Connah's Quay Nomads (Wales)	0–1	(Georgia (country)) Dinamo Tbilisi
Main Path
Hammarby IF (Sweden)	0–3	(Poland) Lech Poznań
Kaisar (Kazakhstan)	1–4	(Cyprus) APOEL
Mura (Slovenia)	3–0	(Denmark) AGF
Maccabi Haifa (Israel)	2–1	(Kazakhstan) Kairat
Locomotive Tbilisi (Georgia (country))	2–1	(Russia) Dynamo Moscow
Neftçi (Azerbaijan)	1–3	(Turkey) Galatasaray
B36 (Faroe Islands)	2–2 (a.e.t.) (5–4 p)	(Wales) The New Saints
Coleraine (Northern Ireland)	2–2 (a.e.t.) (0–3 p)	(Scotland) Motherwell
IFK Göteborg (Sweden)	1–2	(Denmark) Copenhagen
TSC (Serbia)	6–6 (a.e.t.) (4–5 p)	(Romania) FCSB
Teuta (Albania)	0–4	(Spain) Granada
OFI (Greece)	0–1	(Cyprus) Apollon Limassol
Progrès Niederkorn (Luxembourg)	0–5	(Netherlands) Willem II
Viking (Norway)	0–2	(Scotland) Aberdeen
Standard Liège (Belgium)	2–0 (Note: Bala Town were drawn as the home team in the original draw, but the tie was switched to a home match of Standard Liège due to the inability of Bala Town to secure a suitable venue.)	(Wales) Bala Town
Sfîntul Gheorghe (Moldova)	0–1 (a.e.t.)	(Serbia) Partizan
CSKA Sofia (Bulgaria)	2–0	(Belarus) BATE Borisov
Botoșani (Romania)	0–1	(North Macedonia) Shkëndija
Lokomotiv Plovdiv (Bulgaria)	1–2	(England) Tottenham Hotspur
Laçi (Albania)	1–2	(Israel) Hapoel Be'er Sheva
Aris (Greece)	1–2	(Ukraine) Kolos Kovalivka
Honvéd (Hungary)	0–2	(Sweden) Malmö FF
Ventspils (Latvia)	1–5	(Norway) Rosenborg
Riteriai (Lithuania)	1–5	(Czech Republic) Slovan Liberec
Lincoln Red Imps (Gibraltar)	0–5	(Scotland) Rangers
Servette (Switzerland)	0–1	(France) Reims
Borac Banja Luka (Bosnia and Herzegovina)	0–2	(Portugal) Rio Ave
Renova (North Macedonia)	0–1	(Croatia) Hajduk Split
Olimpija Ljubljana (Slovenia)	2–3 (a.e.t.)	(Bosnia and Herzegovina) Zrinjski Mostar
Kukësi (Albania)	0–4	(Germany) VfL Wolfsburg
DAC Dunajská Streda (Slovakia)	5–3 (a.e.t.)	(Czech Republic) Jablonec
Piast Gliwice (Poland)	3–2	(Austria) Hartberg
Osijek (Croatia)	1–2	(Switzerland) Basel
Shamrock Rovers (Republic of Ireland)	0–2	(Italy) Milan
Hibernians (Malta)	0–1	(Hungary) MOL Fehérvár
Bodø/Glimt (Norway)	3–1	(Lithuania) Žalgiris

=== Third qualifying round ===
The draw for the third qualifying round was held on 1 September 2020, 13:00 CEST. The matches were played on 23 and 24 September 2020.

Third qualifying round
Home team	Score	Away team
Champions Path
Tirana (Albania)	Bye	N/A
Ludogorets Razgrad (Bulgaria)	Bye	N/A
Sarajevo (Bosnia and Herzegovina)	2–1	(Montenegro) Budućnost Podgorica
Sheriff Tiraspol (Moldova)	1–1 (a.e.t.) (3–5 p)	(Republic of Ireland) Dundalk
Ararat-Armenia	1–0 (a.e.t.)	(Slovenia) Celje
Riga (Latvia)	0–1	(Scotland) Celtic
KuPS (Finland)	2–0	(Lithuania) Sūduva
Legia Warsaw (Poland)	2–0	(Kosovo) Drita
KÍ (Faroe Islands)	6–1	(Georgia (country)) Dinamo Tbilisi
Djurgårdens IF (Sweden)	0–1	(Romania) CFR Cluj
Floriana (Malta)	0–0 (a.e.t.) (2–4 p)	(Estonia) Flora
Main Path
Mura (Slovenia)	1–5	(Netherlands) PSV Eindhoven
Malmö FF (Sweden)	5–0	(Croatia) Lokomotiva Zagreb
Sporting CP (Portugal)	1–0	(Scotland) Aberdeen
Charleroi (Belgium)	2–1 (a.e.t.)	(Serbia) Partizan
Rosenborg (Norway)	1–0	(Turkey) Alanyaspor
VfL Wolfsburg (Germany)	2–0	(Ukraine) Desna Chernihiv
MOL Fehérvár (Hungary)	0–0 (a.e.t.) (4–1 p)	(France) Reims
Granada (Spain)	2–0	(Georgia (country)) Locomotive Tbilisi
Rijeka (Croatia)	2–0 (a.e.t.)	(Ukraine) Kolos Kovalivka
St. Gallen (Switzerland)	0–1	(Greece) AEK Athens
LASK (Austria)	7–0	(Slovakia) DAC Dunajská Streda
Milan (Italy)	3–2	(Norway) Bodø/Glimt
Shkëndija (North Macedonia)	1–3	(England) Tottenham Hotspur
Standard Liège (Belgium)	2–1 (a.e.t.)	(Serbia) Vojvodina
Rostov (Russia)	1–2	(Israel) Maccabi Haifa
Willem II (Netherlands)	0–4	(Scotland) Rangers
Apollon Limassol (Cyprus)	0–5	(Poland) Lech Poznań
Beşiktaş (Turkey)	1–1 (a.e.t.) (2–4 p)	(Portugal) Rio Ave
FCSB (Romania)	0–2	(Czech Republic) Slovan Liberec
Hapoel Be'er Sheva (Israel)	3–0	(Scotland) Motherwell
Copenhagen (Denmark)	3–0	(Poland) Piast Gliwice
Basel (Switzerland)	3–2	(Cyprus) Anorthosis Famagusta
Galatasaray (Turkey)	2–0	(Croatia) Hajduk Split
Viktoria Plzeň (Czech Republic)	3–0	(Denmark) SønderjyskE
APOEL (Cyprus)	2–2 (a.e.t.) (4–2 p)	(Bosnia and Herzegovina) Zrinjski Mostar
CSKA Sofia (Bulgaria)	3–1	(Faroe Islands) B36

== Play-off round ==
The draw for the play-off round was held on 18 September 2020, 14:00 CEST. The matches were played on 1 October 2020.

Play-off round
Home team	Score	Away team
Champions Path
Young Boys (Switzerland)	3–0	(Albania) Tirana
Dinamo Zagreb (Croatia)	3–1	(Estonia) Flora
CFR Cluj (Romania)	3–1	(Finland) KuPS
Ararat-Armenia	1–2	(Serbia) Red Star Belgrade
Dynamo Brest (Belarus)	0–2	(Bulgaria) Ludogorets Razgrad
Sarajevo (Bosnia and Herzegovina)	0–1	(Scotland) Celtic
Legia Warsaw (Poland)	0–3	(Azerbaijan) Qarabağ
Dundalk (Republic of Ireland)	3–1	(Faroe Islands) KÍ
Main Path
Hapoel Be'er Sheva (Israel)	1–0	(Czech Republic) Viktoria Plzeň
Basel (Switzerland)	1–3	(Bulgaria) CSKA Sofia
Rio Ave (Portugal)	2–2 (a.e.t.) (8–9 p)	(Italy) Milan
Rosenborg (Norway)	0–2	(Netherlands) PSV Eindhoven
Sporting CP (Portugal)	1–4	(Austria) LASK
Copenhagen (Denmark)	0–1	(Croatia) Rijeka
AEK Athens (Greece)	2–1	(Germany) VfL Wolfsburg
Charleroi (Belgium)	1–2	(Poland) Lech Poznań
Malmö FF (Sweden)	1–3	(Spain) Granada
Tottenham Hotspur (England)	7–2	(Israel) Maccabi Haifa
Slovan Liberec (Czech Republic)	1–0	(Cyprus) APOEL
Standard Liège (Belgium)	3–1	(Hungary) MOL Fehérvár
Rangers (Scotland)	2–1	(Turkey) Galatasaray

== Group stage ==
Location of teams of the 2020–21 UEFA Europa League group stage.
Brown: Group A; Green: Group B; Deep Pink: Group C; Yellow: Group D;
Red: Group E; Cyan: Group F; Blue: Group G; Purple: Group H;
Pink: Group I; Turquoise: Group J; Spring Green: Group K; Orange: Group L.

A total of 48 teams played in the group phase: 18 teams which entered in this phase, the 21 winners of the play-off round (eight from Champions Path, thirteen from Main Path), the six losers of the 2020–21 UEFA Champions League play-off round (four from Champions Path, two from League Path), and the three League Path losers of the 2020–21 UEFA Champions League third qualifying round.

The draw for the group phase was held on 2 October 2020, 13:00 CEST. The 48 teams were drawn into twelve groups of four, with the restriction that teams from the same association could not be drawn against each other. For the draw, the teams were seeded into four pots based on their 2020 UEFA club coefficients.

In each group, teams played against each other home-and-away in a round-robin format. The group winners and runners-up advanced to the round of 32, where they were joined by the eight third-placed teams of the 2020–21 UEFA Champions League group phase.

Antwerp, Granada, Leicester City, Omonia and Sivasspor made their debut appearances in the group stage. Furthermore, Granada qualified for any European competition for the first time in the club's history.

Location of Benelux teams of the 2020–21 UEFA Europa League group stage.
Yellow: Group D; Red: Group E; Cyan: Group F; Turquoise: Group J; Spring Green: Group K; Orange: Group L.

Tiebreakers
Teams were ranked according to points (3 points for a win, 1 point for a draw, 0 points for a loss), and if tied on points, the following tiebreaking criteria were applied, in the order given, to determine the rankings (Regulations Articles 16.01):
1. Points in head-to-head matches among tied teams;
2. Goal difference in head-to-head matches among tied teams;
3. Goals scored in head-to-head matches among tied teams;
4. Away goals scored in head-to-head matches among tied teams;
5. If more than two teams were tied, and after applying all head-to-head criteria above, a subset of teams were still tied, all head-to-head criteria above were reapplied exclusively to this subset of teams;
6. Goal difference in all group matches;
7. Goals scored in all group matches;
8. Away goals scored in all group matches;
9. Wins in all group matches;
10. Away wins in all group matches;
11. Disciplinary points (red card = 3 points, yellow card = 1 point, expulsion for two yellow cards in one match = 3 points);
12. UEFA club coefficient.

=== Group A ===
Pos	Team	Pld	W	D	L	GF	GA	GD	Pts	Qualification	ROM	YB	CLJ	CSS
1	(Italy) Roma	6	4	1	1	13	5	+8	13	Advance to knockout phase	—	3–1	5–0	0–0
2	(Switzerland) Young Boys	6	3	1	2	9	7	+2	10	Advance to knockout phase	1–2	—	2–1	3–0
3	(Romania) CFR Cluj	6	1	2	3	4	10	−6	5 (Note: Head-to-head points: CFR Cluj 4, CSKA Sofia 1.)		0–2	1–1	—	0–0
4	(Bulgaria) CSKA Sofia	6	1	2	3	3	7	−4	5		3–1	0–1	0–2	—

Source: UEFA

=== Group B ===
Pos	Team	Pld	W	D	L	GF	GA	GD	Pts	Qualification	ARS	MOL	RW	DUN
1	(England) Arsenal	6	6	0	0	20	5	+15	18	Advance to knockout phase	—	4–1	4–1	3–0
2	(Norway) Molde	6	3	1	2	9	11	−2	10	Advance to knockout phase	0–3	—	1–0	3–1
3	(Austria) Rapid Wien	6	2	1	3	11	13	−2	7		1–2	2–2	—	4–3
4	(Republic of Ireland) Dundalk	6	0	0	6	8	19	−11	0		2–4	1–2	1–3	—

Source: UEFA

=== Group C ===
Pos	Team	Pld	W	D	L	GF	GA	GD	Pts	Qualification	LEV	SLP	HBS	NCE
1	(Germany) Bayer Leverkusen	6	5	0	1	21	8	+13	15	Advance to knockout phase	—	4–0	4–1	6–2
2	(Czech Republic) Slavia Prague	6	4	0	2	11	10	+1	12	Advance to knockout phase	1–0	—	3–0	3–2
3	(Israel) Hapoel Be'er Sheva	6	2	0	4	7	13	−6	6		2–4	3–1	—	1–0
4	(France) Nice	6	1	0	5	8	16	−8	3		2–3	1–3	1–0	—

Source: UEFA

=== Group D ===
Pos	Team	Pld	W	D	L	GF	GA	GD	Pts	Qualification	RAN	BEN	STL	LCH
1	(Scotland) Rangers	6	4	2	0	13	7	+6	14	Advance to knockout phase	—	2–2	3–2	1–0
2	(Portugal) Benfica	6	3	3	0	18	9	+9	12	Advance to knockout phase	3–3	—	3–0	4–0
3	(Belgium) Standard Liège	6	1	1	4	7	14	−7	4		0–2	2–2	—	2–1
4	(Poland) Lech Poznań	6	1	0	5	6	14	−8	3		0–2	2–4	3–1	—

Source: UEFA

=== Group E ===
Pos	Team	Pld	W	D	L	GF	GA	GD	Pts	Qualification	PSV	GRA	PAOK	OMO
1	(Netherlands) PSV Eindhoven	6	4	0	2	12	9	+3	12	Advance to knockout phase	—	1–2	3–2	4–0
2	(Spain) Granada	6	3	2	1	6	3	+3	11	Advance to knockout phase	0–1	—	0–0	2–1
3	(Greece) PAOK	6	1	3	2	8	7	+1	6		4–1	0–0	—	1–1
4	(Cyprus) Omonia	6	1	1	4	5	12	−7	4		1–2	0–2	2–1	—

Source: UEFA

=== Group F ===
Pos	Team	Pld	W	D	L	GF	GA	GD	Pts	Qualification	NAP	RSO	AZ	RJK
1	(Italy) Napoli	6	3	2	1	7	4	+3	11	Advance to knockout phase	—	1–1	0–1	2–0
2	(Spain) Real Sociedad	6	2	3	1	5	4	+1	9	Advance to knockout phase	0–1	—	1–0	2–2
3	(Netherlands) AZ	6	2	2	2	7	5	+2	8		1–1	0–0	—	4–1
4	(Croatia) Rijeka	6	1	1	4	6	12	−6	4		1–2	0–1	2–1	—

Source: UEFA

=== Group G ===
Pos	Team	Pld	W	D	L	GF	GA	GD	Pts	Qualification	LEI	BRA	ZOR	AEK
1	(England) Leicester City	6	4	1	1	14	5	+9	13 (Note: Head-to-head points: Leicester City 4, Braga 1.)	Advance to knockout phase	—	4–0	3–0	2–0
2	(Portugal) Braga	6	4	1	1	14	10	+4	13	Advance to knockout phase	3–3	—	2–0	3–0
3	(Ukraine) Zorya Luhansk	6	2	0	4	6	11	−5	6		1–0	1–2	—	1–4
4	(Greece) AEK Athens	6	1	0	5	7	15	−8	3		1–2	2–4	0–3	—

Source: UEFA

=== Group H ===
Pos	Team	Pld	W	D	L	GF	GA	GD	Pts	Qualification	MIL	LOSC	SPP	CEL
1	(Italy) Milan	6	4	1	1	12	7	+5	13	Advance to knockout phase	—	0–3	3–0	4–2
2	(France) Lille	6	3	2	1	14	8	+6	11	Advance to knockout phase	1–1	—	2–1	2–2
3	(Czech Republic) Sparta Prague	6	2	0	4	10	12	−2	6		0–1	1–4	—	4–1
4	(Scotland) Celtic	6	1	1	4	10	19	−9	4		1–3	3–2	1–4	—

Source: UEFA

=== Group I ===
Pos	Team	Pld	W	D	L	GF	GA	GD	Pts	Qualification	VIL	MTA	SIV	QRB
1	(Spain) Villarreal	6	5	1	0	17	5	+12	16	Advance to knockout phase	—	4–0	5–3	3–0 (Note: The Villarreal v Qarabağ match was awarded as a 3–0 win to Villarreal after being cancelled as several players of the Qarabağ squad tested positive for the SARS-CoV-2.)
2	(Israel) Maccabi Tel Aviv	6	3	2	1	6	7	−1	11	Advance to knockout phase	1–1	—	1–0	1–0
3	(Turkey) Sivasspor	6	2	0	4	9	11	−2	6		0–1	1–2	—	2–0
4	(Azerbaijan) Qarabağ	6	0	1	5	4	13	−9	1		1–3	1–1	2–3	—

Source: UEFA

=== Group J ===
Pos	Team	Pld	W	D	L	GF	GA	GD	Pts	Qualification	TOT	ANT	LASK	LUD
1	(England) Tottenham Hotspur	6	4	1	1	15	5	+10	13	Advance to knockout phase	—	2–0	3–0	4–0
2	(Belgium) Antwerp	6	4	0	2	8	5	+3	12	Advance to knockout phase	1–0	—	0–1	3–1
3	(Austria) LASK	6	3	1	2	11	12	−1	10		3–3	0–2	—	4–3
4	(Bulgaria) Ludogorets Razgrad	6	0	0	6	7	19	−12	0		1–3	1–2	1–3	—

Source: UEFA

=== Group K ===
Pos	Team	Pld	W	D	L	GF	GA	GD	Pts	Qualification	DZG	WAC	FEY	CSM
1	(Croatia) Dinamo Zagreb	6	4	2	0	9	1	+8	14	Advance to knockout phase	—	1–0	0–0	3–1
2	(Austria) Wolfsberger AC	6	3	1	2	7	6	+1	10	Advance to knockout phase	0–3	—	1–0	1–1
3	(Netherlands) Feyenoord	6	1	2	3	4	8	−4	5		0–2	1–4	—	3–1
4	(Russia) CSKA Moscow	6	0	3	3	3	8	−5	3		0–0	0–1	0–0	—

Source: UEFA

=== Group L ===
Pos	Team	Pld	W	D	L	GF	GA	GD	Pts	Qualification	HOF	ZVE	LIB	GNT
1	(Germany) TSG Hoffenheim	6	5	1	0	17	2	+15	16	Advance to knockout phase	—	2–0	5–0	4–1
2	(Serbia) Red Star Belgrade	6	3	2	1	9	4	+5	11	Advance to knockout phase	0–0	—	5–1	2–1
3	(Czech Republic) Slovan Liberec	6	2	1	3	4	13	−9	7		0–2	0–0	—	1–0
4	(Belgium) Gent	6	0	0	6	4	15	−11	0		1–4	0–2	1–2	—

Source: UEFA

== Knockout phase ==
In the knockout phase, teams played against each other over two legs on a home-and-away basis, except for the one-match final. The mechanism of the draws for each round was as follows:

- In the draw for the round of 32, the twelve group winners and the four third-placed teams from the Champions League group stage with the better group records were seeded, and the twelve group runners-up and the other four third-placed teams from the Champions League group stage were unseeded. The seeded teams were drawn against the unseeded teams, with the seeded teams hosting the second leg. Teams from the same group or the same association cannot be drawn against each other.
- In the draws for the round of 16 onwards, there were no seedings, and teams from the same group or the same association could be drawn against each other. As the draws for the quarter-finals and semi-finals were held together before the quarter-finals were played, the identity of the quarter-final winners was not known at the time of the semi-final draw. A draw was also held to determine which semi-final winner was designated as the "home" team for the final (for administrative purposes as it was played at a neutral venue).

=== Bracket ===
Round of 32
(Austria) Wolfsberger AC	1	0	1
(England) Tottenham Hotspur	4	4	8
(Russia) Krasnodar	2	0	2
(Croatia) Dinamo Zagreb	3	1	4
(Ukraine) Dynamo Kyiv	1	1	2
(Belgium) Club Brugge	1	0	1
(Austria) Red Bull Salzburg	0	1	1
(Spain) Villarreal	2	2	4
(Greece) Olympiacos	4	1	5
(Netherlands) PSV Eindhoven	2	2	4
(Portugal) Benfica	1	2	3
(England) Arsenal	1	3	4
(Czech Republic) Slavia Prague	0	2	2
(England) Leicester City	0	0	0
(Belgium) Antwerp	3	2	5
(Scotland) Rangers	4	5	9
(Spain) Granada	2	1	3
(Italy) Napoli	0	2	2
(Norway) Molde	3	2	5
(Germany) TSG Hoffenheim	3	0	3
(Spain) Real Sociedad	0	0	0
(England) Manchester United	4	0	4
(Serbia) Red Star Belgrade	2	1	3
(Italy) Milan (a)	2	1	3
(France) Lille	1	1	2
(Netherlands) Ajax	2	2	4
(Switzerland) Young Boys	4	2	6
(Germany) Bayer Leverkusen	3	0	3
(Portugal) Braga	0	1	1
(Italy) Roma	2	3	5
(Israel) Maccabi Tel Aviv	0	0	0
(Ukraine) Shakhtar Donetsk	2	1	3

Round of 16
(England) Tottenham Hotspur	2	0	2
(Croatia) Dinamo Zagreb (a.e.t.)	0	3	3
(Ukraine) Dynamo Kyiv	0	0	0
(Spain) Villarreal	2	2	4
(Greece) Olympiacos	1	1	2
(England) Arsenal	3	0	3
(Czech Republic) Slavia Prague	1	2	3
(Scotland) Rangers	1	0	1
(Spain) Granada	2	1	3
(Norway) Molde	0	2	2
(England) Manchester United	1	1	2
(Italy) Milan	1	0	1
(Netherlands) Ajax	3	2	5
(Switzerland) Young Boys	0	0	0
(Italy) Roma	3	2	5
(Ukraine) Shakhtar Donetsk	0	1	1

Quarter-finals
(Croatia) Dinamo Zagreb	0	1	1
(Spain) Villarreal	1	2	3
(England) Arsenal	1	4	5
(Czech Republic) Slavia Prague	1	0	1
(Spain) Granada	0	0	0
(England) Manchester United	2	2	4
(Netherlands) Ajax	1	1	2
(Italy) Roma	2	1	3

Semi-finals
(Spain) Villarreal	2	0	2
(England) Arsenal	1	0	1
(England) Manchester United	6	2	8
(Italy) Roma	2	3	5

Final
26 May – Gdańsk
(Spain) Villarreal (p)	1 (11)
(England) Manchester United	1 (10)

=== Round of 32 ===
The draw for the round of 32 was held on 14 December 2020, 13:00 CET. The first legs were played on 18 February, and the second legs were played on 24 and 25 February 2021.

Team 1	Agg.	Team 2	1st leg	2nd leg
Wolfsberger AC (Austria)	1–8	(England) Tottenham Hotspur	1–4	0–4
Dynamo Kyiv (Ukraine)	2–1	(Belgium) Club Brugge	1–1	1–0
Real Sociedad (Spain)	0–4	(England) Manchester United	0–4	0–0
Benfica (Portugal)	3–4	(England) Arsenal	1–1	2–3
Red Star Belgrade (Serbia)	3–3 (a)	(Italy) Milan	2–2	1–1
Antwerp (Belgium)	5–9	(Scotland) Rangers	3–4	2–5
Slavia Prague (Czech Republic)	2–0	(England) Leicester City	0–0	2–0
Red Bull Salzburg (Austria)	1–4	(Spain) Villarreal	0–2	1–2
Braga (Portugal)	1–5	(Italy) Roma	0–2	1–3
Krasnodar (Russia)	2–4	(Croatia) Dinamo Zagreb	2–3	0–1
Young Boys (Switzerland)	6–3	(Germany) Bayer Leverkusen	4–3	2–0
Molde (Norway)	5–3	(Germany) TSG Hoffenheim	3–3	2–0
Granada (Spain)	3–2	(Italy) Napoli	2–0	1–2
Maccabi Tel Aviv (Israel)	0–3	(Ukraine) Shakhtar Donetsk	0–2	0–1
Lille (France)	2–4	(Netherlands) Ajax	1–2	1–2
Olympiacos (Greece)	5–4	(Netherlands) PSV Eindhoven	4–2	1–2

=== Round of 16 ===
The draw for the round of 16 was held on 26 February 2021, 13:00 CET. The first legs were played on 11 March, and the second legs were played on 18 March 2021.

Team 1	Agg.	Team 2	1st leg	2nd leg
Ajax (Netherlands)	5–0	(Switzerland) Young Boys	3–0	2–0
Dynamo Kyiv (Ukraine)	0–4	(Spain) Villarreal	0–2	0–2
Roma (Italy)	5–1	(Ukraine) Shakhtar Donetsk	3–0	2–1
Olympiacos (Greece)	2–3	(England) Arsenal	1–3	1–0
Tottenham Hotspur (England)	2–3 (Note: Order of legs between Tottenham Hotspur and Dinamo Zagreb were reversed after original draw, in order to avoid a scheduling conflict with the Arsenal v Olympiacos second leg in the same city on 18 March, as Arsenal were the domestic cup winners and given higher priority over Tottenham Hotspur.)	(Croatia) Dinamo Zagreb	2–0	0–3 (a.e.t.)
Manchester United (England)	2–1	(Italy) Milan	1–1	1–0
Slavia Prague (Czech Republic)	3–1	(Scotland) Rangers	1–1	2–0
Granada (Spain)	3–2	(Norway) Molde	2–0	1–2

=== Quarter-finals ===
The draw for the quarter-finals was held on 19 March 2021, 13:00 CET. The first legs were played on 8 April, and the second legs were played on 15 April 2021.

Team 1	Agg.	Team 2	1st leg	2nd leg
Granada (Spain)	0–4	(England) Manchester United	0–2	0–2
Arsenal (England)	5–1	(Czech Republic) Slavia Prague	1–1	4–0
Ajax (Netherlands)	2–3	(Italy) Roma	1–2	1–1
Dinamo Zagreb (Croatia)	1–3	(Spain) Villarreal	0–1	1–2

=== Semi-finals ===
The draw for the semi-finals was held on 19 March 2021, 13:00 CET, after the quarter-final draw. The first legs were played on 29 April, and the second legs were played on 6 May 2021.

Team 1	Agg.	Team 2	1st leg	2nd leg
Manchester United (England)	8–5	(Italy) Roma	6–2	2–3
Villarreal (Spain)	2–1	(England) Arsenal	2–1	0–0

=== Final ===
The final was played on 26 May 2021 at the Stadion Gdańsk in Gdańsk. A draw was held on 19 March 2021, after the quarter-final and semi-final draws, to determine the "home" team for administrative purposes.

26 May 2021
21:00 UTC+2

Villarreal (Spain)	1–1 (a.e.t.)	(England) Manchester United
Gerard 29'	Report	Cavani 55'
Penalties
Gerard (penalty scored); Raba (penalty scored); Alcácer (penalty scored); Moreno (penalty scored); Parejo (penalty scored); Gómez (penalty scored); Albiol (penalty scored); Coquelin (penalty scored); Gaspar (penalty scored); Torres (penalty scored); Rulli (penalty scored)	11–10	(penalty scored) Mata; (penalty scored) Telles; (penalty scored) Fernandes; (penalty scored) Rashford; (penalty scored) Cavani; (penalty scored) Fred; (penalty scored) James; (penalty scored) Shaw; (penalty scored) Tuanzebe; (penalty scored) Lindelöf; (penalty missed) De Gea

Stadion Gdańsk, Gdańsk
Attendance: 9,412
Referee: Clément Turpin (France)

== Statistics ==
Statistics exclude qualifying rounds and play-off round.

=== Top goalscorers ===
Rank	Player	Team	Goals	Minutes played
1	(Portugal) Pizzi	(Portugal) Benfica	7	385
1	(Turkey) Yusuf Yazıcı	(France) Lille	7	625
1	(Spain) Borja Mayoral	(Italy) Roma	7	659
1	(Spain) Gerard Moreno	(Spain) Villarreal	7	879
5	(Uruguay) Edinson Cavani	(England) Manchester United	6	368
5	(Israel) Mu'nas Dabbur	(Germany) TSG Hoffenheim	6	468
5	(Brazil) Carlos Vinícius	(England) Tottenham Hotspur	6	499
5	(Spain) Paco Alcácer	(Spain) Villarreal	6	519
5	(Bosnia and Herzegovina) Edin Džeko	(Italy) Roma	6	566
5	(Ivory Coast) Nicolas Pépé	(England) Arsenal	6	903
5	(Croatia) Mislav Oršić	(Croatia) Dinamo Zagreb	6	976

=== Top assists ===
Rank	Player	Team	Assists	Minutes played
1	(Brazil) Galeno	(Portugal) Braga	5	571
1	(Nigeria) Samuel Chukwueze	(Spain) Villarreal	5	772
1	(Spain) Gerard Moreno	(Spain) Villarreal	5	879
4	(England) Joe Willock	(England) Arsenal	4	344
4	(Israel) Lior Refaelov	(Belgium) Antwerp	4	636
4	(Colombia) Alfredo Morelos	(Scotland) Rangers	4	717
4	(Portugal) Bruno Fernandes	(England) Manchester United	4	748
4	(Norway) Magnus Wolff Eikrem	(Norway) Molde	4	816
4	(Ivory Coast) Nicolas Pépé	(England) Arsenal	4	903
4	(Croatia) Lovro Majer	(Croatia) Dinamo Zagreb	4	909

=== Squad of the season ===
The UEFA technical study group selected the following 23 players as the squad of the tournament.

Pos.	Player	Team
GK	(Croatia) Dominik Livaković	(Croatia) Dinamo Zagreb
GK	(Spain) Pau López	(Italy) Roma
GK	(Argentina) Gerónimo Rulli	(Spain) Villarreal
DF	(Spain) Raúl Albiol	(Spain) Villarreal
DF	(England) Harry Maguire	(England) Manchester United
DF	(England) Aaron Wan-Bissaka	(England) Manchester United
DF	(Italy) Gianluca Mancini	(Italy) Roma
DF	(Italy) Leonardo Spinazzola	(Italy) Roma
DF	(Spain) Alfonso Pedraza	(Spain) Villarreal
DF	(Spain) Pau Torres	(Spain) Villarreal
MF	(Portugal) Bruno Fernandes	(England) Manchester United
MF	(Spain) Dani Parejo	(Spain) Villarreal
MF	(Italy) Lorenzo Pellegrini	(Italy) Roma
MF	(France) Paul Pogba	(England) Manchester United
MF	(France) Étienne Capoue	(Spain) Villarreal
MF	(Croatia) Mislav Oršić	(Croatia) Dinamo Zagreb
MF	(Czech Republic) Lukáš Provod	(Czech Republic) Slavia Prague
MF	(Scotland) Scott McTominay	(England) Manchester United
FW	(Spain) Gerard Moreno	(Spain) Villarreal
FW	(Uruguay) Edinson Cavani	(England) Manchester United
FW	(Serbia) Dušan Tadić	(Netherlands) Ajax
FW	(Bosnia and Herzegovina) Edin Džeko	(Italy) Roma
FW	(Ivory Coast) Nicolas Pépé	(England) Arsenal

=== Player of the season ===
Votes were cast by coaches of the 48 teams in the group stage, together with 55 journalists selected by the European Sports Media (ESM) group, representing each of UEFA's member associations. The coaches were not allowed to vote for players from their own teams. Jury members selected their top three players, with the first receiving five points, the second three and the third one. The shortlist of the top three players was announced on 13 August 2021. The award winner was announced during the 2021–22 UEFA Europa League group stage draw in Turkey on 27 August 2021.

Rank	Player	Team(s)	Points
Shortlist of top three
1	(Spain) Gerard Moreno	(Spain) Villarreal	289
2	(Portugal) Bruno Fernandes	(England) Manchester United	160
3	(Uruguay) Edinson Cavani	(England) Manchester United	44
Players ranked 4–10
4	(France) Paul Pogba	(England) Manchester United	36
5	(Spain) Pau Torres	(Spain) Villarreal	34
6	(Spain) Raúl Albiol	(Spain) Villarreal	19
7	(Spain) Dani Parejo	(Spain) Villarreal	18
8	(Italy) Leonardo Spinazzola	(Italy) Roma	14
9	(France) Étienne Capoue	(Spain) Villarreal	8
9	(Ivory Coast) Nicolas Pépé	(England) Arsenal	8

== See also ==
- 2020–21 UEFA Champions League
- 2021 UEFA Super Cup
