= Rony Hanselmann =

Liechtenstein footballer

Personal information
- Full name: Rony Hanselmann
- Date of birth: 25 June 1991 (age 35)
- Place of birth: Liechtenstein
- Height: 1.87 m (6 ft 1 1/2 in)
- Position: Midfielder

Team information
- Current team: FC Balzers
- Number: 19

Youth career
- 2000–2009: FC Triesenberg

Senior career*
Years	Team	Apps	(Gls)
2009–2013	FC Balzers	45	(4)

International career^{‡}
2009–2012	Liechtenstein U21	12	(1)
2010–2011	Liechtenstein	6	(0)
- * Club domestic league appearances and goals as of 19 July 2010 ‡ National team caps and goals as of 17 November 2011

Rony Hanselmann (born 25 June 1991) is a former Liechtensteiner footballer who last played for FC Balzers.

== Career ==
Hanselmann began his youth career with FC Triesenberg and moved onto FC Balzers in 2009.

== International career ==
He was a member of the Liechtenstein national under-21 football team and had 12 caps and one goal. Hanselmann received his first call-up to the senior team for the UEFA Euro 2012 qualifying match against Spain on 3 September 2010 and made his debut as a substitute versus the Czech Republic on 12 October 2010.
