= Sportanlage Leitawies =

Football stadium in Triesenberg, Liechtenstein

Sportanlage Leitawis
- Interactive map of Sportanlage Leitawis
- Location: Triesenberg, Liechtenstein
- Coordinates: 47°6′52.2″N 9°32′24.36″E
- Capacity: 800
- Surface: Grass

Tenant
- FC Triesenberg

Sportanlange Leitawis is a football stadium in Triesenberg, Liechtenstein. It is the home ground of FC Triesenberg and has a capacity of 800 made up of 400 seats and 400 standing places.

== See also ==
- List of football stadiums in Liechtenstein
