= Jonne Hjelm =

Finnish footballer (born 1988)

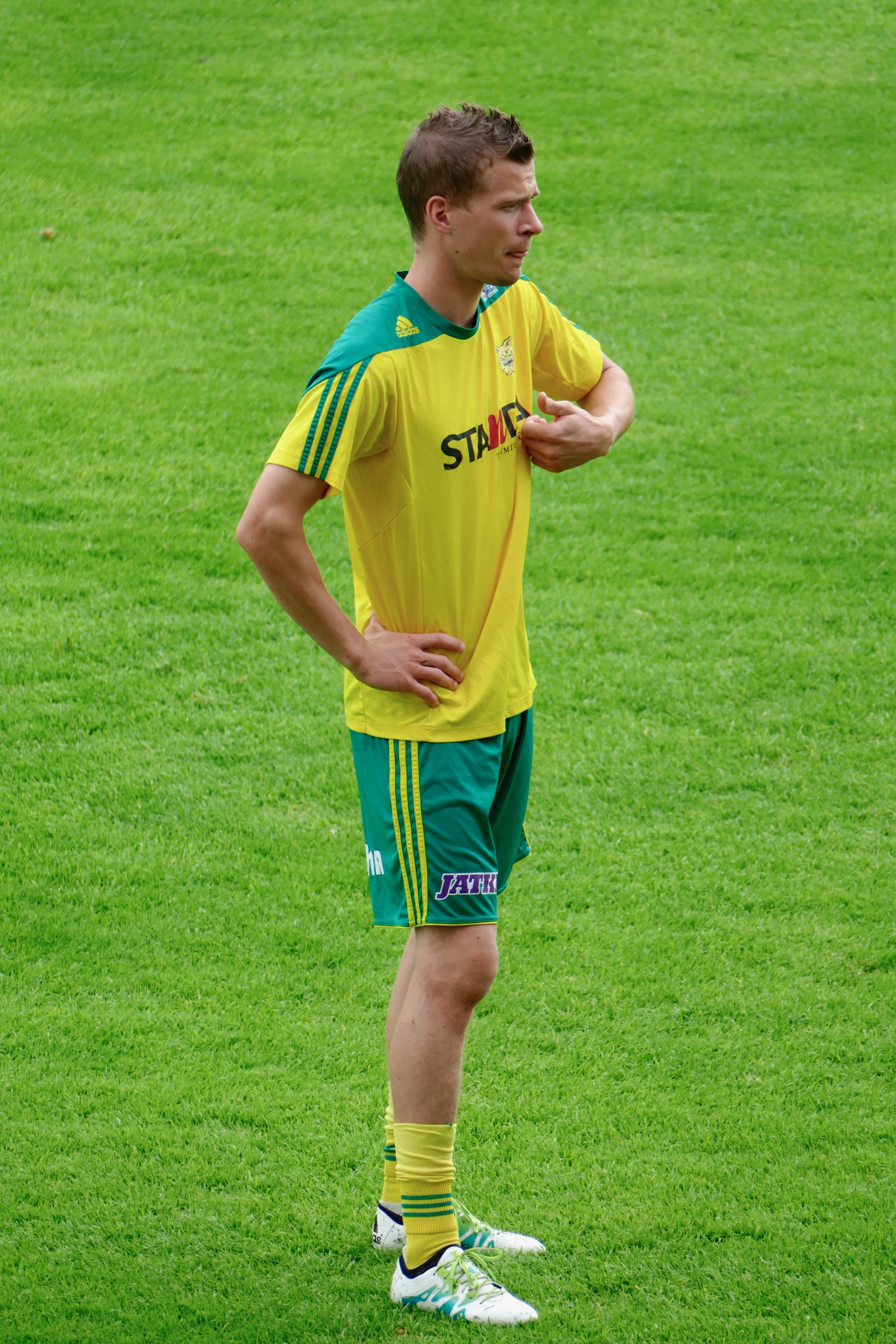
- Hjelm with Ilves in 2016

Personal information
- Full name: Jonne Hjelm
- Date of birth: 14 January 1988 (age 38)
- Place of birth: Tampere, Finland
- Height: 1.81 m (5 ft 11 in)
- Position: Forward

Youth career
- Ilves

Senior career*
Years	Team	Apps	(Gls)
2007–2010	Tampere United	78	(19)
2007	→ PP-70 (loan)	11	(2)
2008	→ TPV (loan)	1	(1)
2011–2012	Wehen Wiesbaden	8	(0)
2011	→ Wehen Wiesbaden II	1	(1)
2012	Haka	12	(4)
2013–2016	Ilves	105	(27)
Total		216	(53)

International career
2009–2010	Finland U21	8	(5)
- * Club domestic league appearances and goals

Jonne Hjelm (born 14 January 1988) is a Finnish former professional footballer who played as a forward and winger for Finnish clubs Ilves, Tampere United, and Haka, as well as the German club Wehen Wiesbaden. He is the son of Finnish former Tampere United head coach and former footballer Ari Hjelm.

== Career statistics ==
As of 1 September 2024.

Appearances and goals by club, season and competition
Club	Season	League			Cup (Note: Includes Suomen Cup)		League cup		Europe		Total	
Club	Season	Division	Apps	Goals	Apps	Goals	Apps	Goals	Apps	Goals	Apps	Goals
Tampere United	2007	Veikkausliiga	10	2	1	0	–		4 (Note: Appearances in UEFA Champions League and UEFA Cup)	0	15	2
Tampere United	2008	Veikkausliiga	19	7	1	0	–		2 (Note: Appearances in UEFA Champions League)	1	22	8
Tampere United	2009	Veikkausliiga	26	4	4	2	4	4	–		34	10
Tampere United	2010	Veikkausliiga	24	6	–		1	0	–		24	6
Tampere United	Total		79	19	6	2	5	4	6	1	96	29
PP-70 (loan)	2007	Ykkönen	11	2	–		–		–		11	2
TPV (loan)	2008	Ykkönen	1	1	–		–		–		1	1
Wehen Wiesbaden	2011–12	3. Liga	8	0	0	0	1	0	–		9	1
Wehen Wiesbaden II	2011–12	Hessenliga	1	1	–		–		–		1	1
Haka	2012	Veikkausliiga	12	4	–		–		–		12	4
Ilves	2013	Ykkönen	25	12	–		–		–		25	12
Ilves	2014	Ykkönen	25	14	2	0	–		–		27	14
Ilves	2015	Veikkausliiga	29	3	1	0	4	3	–		34	6
Ilves	2016	Veikkausliiga	26	0	2	0	0	0	–		28	0
Ilves	Total		105	29	5	0	4	3	0	0	114	32
Career total			217	56	11	2	10	7	6	1	244	66

== Honours ==
Tampere United

- Veikkausliiga: 2007
- Finnish Cup: 2007
- Finnish League Cup: 2009
