= Liechtenstein Football Association =

Governing body of association football in Liechtenstein

UEFA
- Founded: 28 April 1934
- Headquarters: Schaan
- FIFA affiliation: 1974
- UEFA affiliation: 1974
- President: Hugo Quaderer
- Website: www.lfv.li

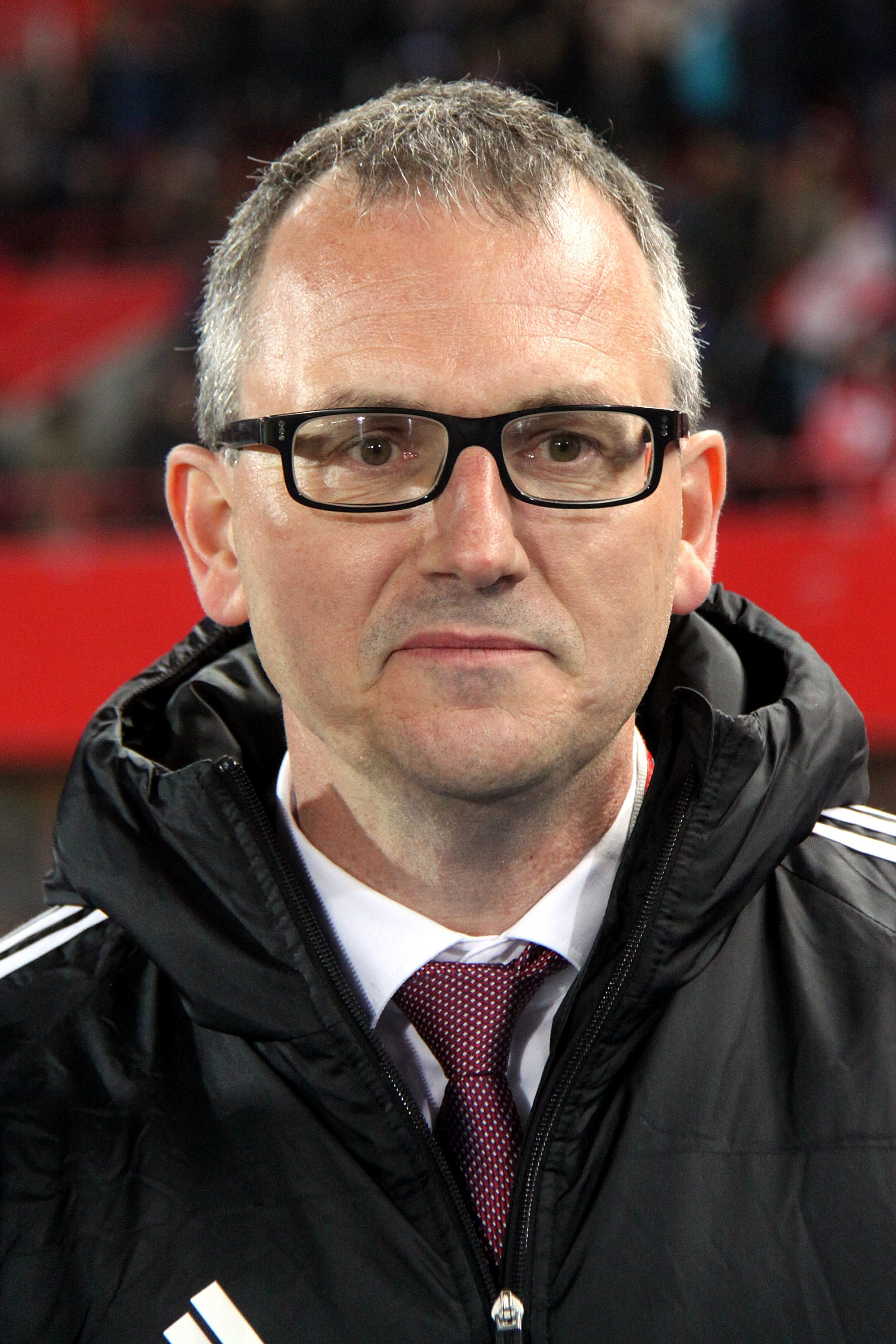
President Hugo Quaderer

The Liechtenstein Football Association (LFA; German: Liechtensteiner Fussballverband) is the governing body of football in Liechtenstein. It was established on 28 April 1934, and became affiliated to UEFA on 22 May 1974. The association organizes the Liechtenstein national football team and the Liechtenstein Football Cup. Because Liechtenstein has fewer than 8 (only 7 not counting reserves) active teams, it is the only UEFA member without its own national league. This means the Liechtensteiner teams play in the Swiss Football League system. The LFV is based in Schaan.

== See also ==
- Liechtenstein national football team
- Liechtenstein Football Cup
- Liechtenstein football clubs in European competitions
- Football in Liechtenstein
