= List of football clubs in Liechtenstein =

In Liechtenstein there is no national association football league. The seven clubs play in the Swiss football league system.

== List of clubs ==
| Club | Town | Home stadium | Capacity | League tier (2026–27) |
|---|---|---|---|---|
| FC Balzers | Balzers | Sportplatz Rheinau | 2,000 | 5 |
| USV Eschen/Mauren | Eschen and Mauren | Sportpark Eschen-Mauren | 2,000 | 4 |
| FC Ruggell | Ruggell | Freizeitpark Widau | 500 | 6 |
| FC Schaan | Schaan | Sportsplatz Rheinwiese | 1,500 | 7 |
| FC Triesen | Triesen | Blumenau Stadium | 2,100 | 7 |
| FC Triesenberg | Triesenberg | Sportanlage Leitawis | 800 | 7 |
| FC Vaduz | Vaduz | Rheinpark Stadion | 7,584 | 1 |

== See also ==
- Liechtenstein Football Cup
- List of top-division football clubs in Liechtenstein (and other UEFA member countries)
