= FC Triesenberg =

Association football club in Liechtenstein

Triesenberg
- Full name: Fussball-Club Triesenberg
- Founded: 28 May 1972; 54 years ago
- Ground: Sportanlage Leitawies; Triesenberg, Liechtenstein
- Capacity: 800
- Chairman: Mario Gassner
- Manager: Franz Schädler
- League: 3. Liga
- 2023–24: 3. Liga, Group 1 (OFV), 8th of 12
- Website: https://fctriesenberg.li/
Home colours	Away colours

Fussball Club Triesenberg is a Liechtensteiner amateur football team that plays in Triesenberg, Liechtenstein. It is one of the seven official teams in the nation. They play in the Swiss Football League in the 3. Liga, the seventh tier of Swiss football. The team annually competes in the Liechtenstein Cup. The club has never won the tournament, but was the runner-up in the 2014–2015 and in the 2023–2024 edition.

== History ==
The team was founded in 1972. Like all the other teams in Liechtenstein they started playing in the Swiss leagues, in this case in 4. Liga. They achieved promotion for the first time in their history in the 1986/1987 season, being promoted to 3. Liga. They stayed in that league till 1998, when they were relegated. In 2001 they were promoted back to 3. Liga and in 2010 were promoted to 2. Liga. In 2015, they reached the final of the Liechtenstein Cup for the first time in the club's history, losing 5–0 in the final against FC Vaduz. They reached the final for a second time in 2024, after beating FC Triesen in the semi-finals 2–0.

== Honours ==
- Liechtenstein Football Cup
  - Runners-up (2): 2015, 2024

== Current squad ==
As of 28 December 2025. Note: Flags indicate national team as defined under FIFA eligibility rules; some limited exceptions apply. Players may hold more than one non-FIFA nationality.

No.	Pos.	Nation	Player
1	GK	LIE	Claudio Dosch
3	DF	LIE	Felix Gritsch
4	DF	LIE	Lukas Büchel
5	DF	POR	Ricardo Maia
6	MF	LIE	Luca Meier
7	DF	LIE	Robin Gassner
8	MF	LIE	Victor Ribeiro
9	MF	LIE	Lucas Viegas
10	MF	SUI	Diego Mazzini
11	FW	SUI	Cédric Chevalley
12	GK	AUT	Nikola Pupovac
13	FW	LIE	Matthias Hoop

No.	Pos.	Nation	Player
14	DF	SUI	Hamza Sljivar
17	DF	CRO	Mihajlo Savic
18	FW	LIE	Jonas Gassner
19	MF	LIE	Sebastian Beck
20	MF	LIE	André Arpagaus
21	FW	ITA	Nicola Cosentino
22	MF	LIE	Fabio Ospelt
24	MF	AUT	Lukas Sommerauer
25	FW	LIE	Tim Schreiber
27	MF	LIE	Rony Hanselmann
28	FW	LIE	Stefan Banzer
29	MF	LIE	Julian Beck
30	MF	LIE	Fernando Vogt
