= Liechtenstein national under-23 football team =

Liechtenstein U-23+
- Association: Liechtenstein Football Association (Liechtensteiner Fussballverband)
- Head coach: Michael Koller
- Captain: Rotation
- Most caps: Kenny Kindle; Severin Schlegel (4)
- Top scorer: Silvan Schiess (1)
First colours	Second colours

First international
- Gibraltar U21 1–1 Liechtenstein (Gibraltar, 28 March 2023)

Biggest defeat
- Liechtenstein 0–4 Sweden U20 (Eschen, Liechtenstein, 15 June 2023); Wales U21 4–0 Liechtenstein (Newport, Wales, 8 September 2023); Albania U21 4–0 Liechtenstein (Durrës, Albania, 11 June 2024)

The Liechtenstein national under-23+ football team (German: Liechtensteinische U23+-Fussballnationalmannschaft) is the reserve national team for Liechtenstein, intended for players who do not warrant a full national team call-up to show their ability. This was announced on 5 October 2022, after announcing the dissolution of the under-21 team. The team plays friendly matches against teams of a similar quality and will allow both older and younger players to participate.

== Players ==
=== Current squad ===
- The following players were called up for the friendly match against Albania U21, on 11 June 2024.
- Caps and goals are correct as of 11 June 2024, after the match against Albania U21.

No.	Pos.	Player	Date of birth (age)	Caps	Goals	Club
1	GK	Tim-Tiado Öhri	15 December 2003 (age 22)	3	0	(Liechtenstein Football Association) Vaduz
12	GK	Elias Burri	5 January 2005 (age 21)	1	0	(Swiss Football Association) FC Buchs
6	DF	Severin Schlegel	24 July 2004 (age 22)	4	0	(Liechtenstein Football Association) Vaduz
5	DF	David Jäger	4 July 2004 (age 22)	3	0	(Liechtenstein Football Association) Vaduz
7	DF	Jakob Lorenz	11 September 2001 (age 25)	2	0	(Liechtenstein Football Association) Vaduz
13	DF	Kilian Büchel	2 December 2002 (age 23)	2	0	(Liechtenstein Football Association) Eschen/Mauren
3	DF	Johannes Schädler	12 July 2003 (age 23)	2	0	(Liechtenstein Football Association) Vaduz II
	DF	Luca Beck	14 August 2005 (age 21)	2	0	(Liechtenstein Football Association) Vaduz II
10	DF	Andrin Netzer (captain)	11 January 2002 (age 24)	1	0	(Liechtenstein Football Association) Eschen/Mauren
4	DF	Felix Oberwaditzer	14 March 2006 (age 20)	1	0	(Austrian Football Association) AKA Vorarlberg U18
	DF	Julian Keller	23 July 2006 (age 20)	1	0	(Liechtenstein Football Association) Vaduz U18
11	MF	Kenny Kindle	29 November 2003 (age 22)	4	0	(Liechtenstein Football Association) Triesen
8	MF	Alessio Hasler	7 July 2005 (age 21)	3	0	(Liechtenstein Football Association) Vaduz
	MF	Philip Käppeli	16 April 2005 (age 21)	2	0	(Swiss Football Association) Tägerwilen
2	MF	Jonas Weissenhofer	25 July 2006 (age 20)	1	0	(Liechtenstein Football Association) Vaduz U18
9	FW	Fabio Luque Notaro	31 August 2005 (age 21)	3	0	(Liechtenstein Football Association) Vaduz
	FW	Louis Linsmaier	18 November 2005 (age 20)	1	0	(Liechtenstein Football Association) Vaduz II

=== Recent call-ups ===
The following players have been called up for the team within the last 12 months and are still available for selection.

Pos.	Player	Date of birth (age)	Caps	Goals	Club	Latest call-up
GK	Lukas Verling	16 September 2005 (age 21)	0	0	(Liechtenstein) Vaduz II	v. Wales U21, 8 September 2023
DF	Noah Graber	3 May 2001 (age 25)	3	0	(Switzerland) Altstätten	v. Wales U21, 8 September 2023
DF	Lukas Graber	3 May 2001 (age 25)	2	0	(Liechtenstein) Eschen/Mauren	v. Wales U21, 8 September 2023
DF	Elias Jäger	15 February 2002 (age 24)	2	0	(Liechtenstein) Eschen/Mauren II	v. Wales U21, 8 September 2023
MF	Noah Frick	16 October 2001 (age 25)	1	0	(Liechtenstein) Triesenberg	v. Wales U21, 8 September 2023
MF	Liam Kranz	17 July 2003 (age 23)	1	0	(Liechtenstein) Schaan	v. Wales U21, 8 September 2023
FW	Julius Fischer	10 June 2004 (age 22)	3	0	(Austria) SCR Altach	v. Wales U21, 8 September 2023
FW	Emanuel Zünd	29 December 2004 (age 21)	1	0	(Switzerland) Veyrier Sports	v. Wales U21, 8 September 2023

== See also ==
- Liechtenstein national football team
