= Liechtenstein national football team results (2020–present) =

This article provides details of international football games played by the Liechtenstein national football team from 2020 to present.

== Results ==
Key
Win
Draw
Defeat

=== 2020 ===
26 March Friendly	Liechtenstein	Cancelled	Azerbaijan	Ta' Qali, Malta

29 March Friendly	Liechtenstein	Cancelled	Gibraltar	Ta' Qali, Malta

8 September 2020–21 UEFA Nations League	San Marino	0–2	Liechtenstein	Rimini, Italy
20:45		Report	Hasler 3' (pen.); Y. Frick 14'	Stadium: Stadio Romeo Neri (Note: The San Marino v Liechtenstein match, originally scheduled to be played at San Marino Stadium, Serravalle, was later moved to Stadio Romeo Neri, Rimini in Italy. The late move came after the Swiss Federal Office of Public Health, which Liechtenstein follows for anti-contagion measures, as of 7 September 2020 included San Marino among the countries for which there is a mandatory quarantine period upon re-entry into one's own state. The match was therefore moved to Italy, in nearby Rimini.); Attendance: 0 (Note: Due to the COVID-19 pandemic in Europe, all matches scheduled for September 2020 were played behind closed doors.); Referee: Enea Jorgji (Albania)

7 October Friendly	Luxembourg	1–2	Liechtenstein	Luxembourg City, Luxembourg
20:15	Rodrigues 72'	Report	Wolfinger 23'; Hasler 62' (pen.)	Stadium: Stade Josy Barthel; Attendance: 0 Referee: Alexandre Boucaut (Belgium)

10 October 2020–21 UEFA Nations League	Liechtenstein	0–1	Gibraltar	Vaduz, Liechtenstein
18:00		Report	De Barr 10'	Stadium: Rheinpark Stadion; Attendance: 178; Referee: Kirill Levnikov (Russia)

13 October 2020–21 UEFA Nations League	Liechtenstein	0–0	San Marino	Vaduz, Liechtenstein
20:45		Report		Stadium: Rheinpark Stadion; Attendance: 178; Referee: Jørgen Daugbjerg Burchardt (Denmark)

11 November Friendly	Malta	3–0	Liechtenstein	Ta' Qali, Malta
19:45	Mifsud 5'; Borg 20'; Farrugia 84' (pen.)	Report		Stadium: Ta' Qali National Stadium; Attendance: 0 Referee: Manfredas Lukjančukas (Lithuania)

17 November 2020–21 UEFA Nations League	Gibraltar	1–1	Liechtenstein	Gibraltar
20:45	Frommelt 17' (o.g.)	Report	N. Frick 44'	Stadium: Victoria Stadium; Attendance: 0 Referee: Trustin Farrugia Cann (Malta)

=== 2021 ===
25 March 2022 FIFA World Cup qualification	Liechtenstein	0–1	Armenia	Vaduz, Liechtenstein
20:45		Report	Frommelt 83' (o.g.)	Stadium: Rheinpark Stadion; Attendance: 0 Referee: Julian Weinberger (Austria)

28 March 2022 FIFA World Cup qualification	North Macedonia	5–0	Liechtenstein	Skopje, North Macedonia
20:45	Bardhi 7'; Trajkovski 51', 54'; Elmas 62'; Nestorovski 82' (pen.)	Report		Stadium: Toše Proeski Arena; Attendance: 0 Referee: Mykola Balakin (Ukraine)

31 March 2022 FIFA World Cup qualification	Liechtenstein	1–4	Iceland	Vaduz, Liechtenstein
20:45	Y. Frick 79'	Report	Sævarsson 12'; Bjarnason 45+1'; Pálsson 77'; Sigurjónsson 90+4' (pen.)	Stadium: Rheinpark Stadion; Attendance: 0 Referee: Mohammed Al-Hakim (Sweden)

3 June Friendly	Switzerland	7–0	Liechtenstein	St. Gallen, Switzerland
18:00 UTC+2	Gavranović 19', 75', 79'; Fassnacht 46', 70'; Frick 57' (o.g.); Fernandes 85'	Report		Stadium: Kybunpark; Attendance: 0 Referee: Nejc Kajtazović (Slovenia)
Note: The match was originally scheduled for 4 June 2020, but postponed due to the COVID-19 pandemic in Switzerland.

7 June Friendly	Faroe Islands	5–1	Liechtenstein	Tórshavn, Faroe Islands
19:45 UTC+1	Olsen 23', 65'; Hendriksson 38', 41'; Davidsen 79' (pen.)	Report	Göppel 19'	Stadium: Tórsvøllur; Attendance: 0 Referee: Ívar Orri Kristjánsson (Iceland)

2 September 2022 FIFA World Cup qualification	Liechtenstein	0–2	Germany	St. Gallen, Switzerland
20:45 UTC+2		Report	Werner 41'; Sané 77'	Stadium: Kybunpark (Note: Liechtenstein played their home match against Germany at Kybunpark in St. Gallen, Switzerland, since their regular home stadium, the Rheinpark Stadion in Vaduz, is being renovated.); Attendance: 7,958; Referee: Fábio Veríssimo (Portugal)

5 September 2022 FIFA World Cup qualification	Romania	2–0	Liechtenstein	Bucharest, Romania
21:45 UTC+3	Toșca 11'; Manea 18'	Report		Stadium: Arena Națională; Attendance: 9,404; Referee: Kateryna Monzul (Ukraine)

8 September 2022 FIFA World Cup qualification	Armenia	1–1	Liechtenstein	Yerevan, Armenia
20:00	Mkhitaryan 45+5' (pen.)	Report	N. Frick 80'	Stadium: Vazgen Sargsyan Republican Stadium; Attendance: 14,400; Referee: Duje Strukan (Croatia)

8 October 2022 FIFA World Cup qualification	Liechtenstein	0–4	North Macedonia	Vaduz, Liechtenstein
20:45		Report	Velkovski 39'; Alioski 66' (pen.); Nikolov 74'; Churlinov 83'	Stadium: Rheinpark Stadion; Attendance: 1,628; Referee: Bartosz Frankowski (Poland)

11 October 2022 FIFA World Cup qualification	Iceland	4–0	Liechtenstein	Reykjavík, Iceland
18:45	Þórðarson 19'; Guðmundsson 35' (pen.), 79' (pen.); Guðjohnsen 89'	Report		Stadium: Laugardalsvöllur; Attendance: 4,461; Referee: Ioannis Papadopoulos (Greece)

11 November 2022 FIFA World Cup qualification	Germany	9–0	Liechtenstein	Wolfsburg, Germany
20:45	Gündoğan 11' (pen.); Kaufmann 20' (o.g.); Sané 22', 49'; Reus 23'; Müller 76', 86'; Baku 80'; Göppel 89' (o.g.)	Report		Stadium: Volkswagen Arena; Attendance: 25,984; Referee: Ivana Martinčić (Croatia)

14 November 2022 FIFA World Cup qualification	Liechtenstein	0–2	Romania	Vaduz, Liechtenstein
18:00		Report	Man 8'; Bancu 87'	Stadium: Rheinpark Stadion; Attendance: 2,237; Referee: Matej Jug (Slovenia)

=== 2022 ===
25 March Friendly	Liechtenstein	0–6	Cape Verde	San Pedro del Pinatar, Spain
17:00 UTC+1		Report	G. Tavares 18', 38', 45+1'; Semedo 34'; Bebé 73', 83'	Stadium: Pinatar Arena; Referee: Dario Bel (Croatia)

29 March Friendly	Faroe Islands	1–0	Liechtenstein	San Pedro del Pinatar, Spain
17:00 UTC+2	Johannesen 39'	Report		Stadium: Pinatar Arena; Attendance: 20; Referee: Jason Lee Barcelo (Gibraltar)

3 June 2022–23 UEFA Nations League	Liechtenstein	0–2	Moldova	Vaduz, Liechtenstein
20:45 UTC+2		Report	Nicolaescu 5' (pen.); Bolohan 90+1'	Stadium: Rheinpark Stadion; Attendance: 903; Referee: Giorgi Kruashvili (Georgia)

6 June 2022–23 UEFA Nations League	Latvia	1–0	Liechtenstein	Riga, Latvia
19:00 UTC+3	Zjuzins 73'	Report		Stadium: Daugava Stadium; Attendance: 5,966; Referee: Mario Zebec (Croatia)

10 June 2022–23 UEFA Nations League	Andorra	2–1	Liechtenstein	Andorra la Vella, Andorra
20:45 UTC+2	Aláez 78' (pen.); Rubio 82'	Report	Meier 90+3'	Stadium: Estadi Nacional; Attendance: 932; Referee: Nejc Kajtazović (Slovenia)

14 June 2022–23 UEFA Nations League	Liechtenstein	0–2	Latvia	Vaduz, Liechtenstein
20:45 UTC+2		Report	Gutkovskis 20', 28'	Stadium: Rheinpark Stadion; Attendance: 885; Referee: Aleksandar Stavrev (North Macedonia)

22 September 2022–23 UEFA Nations League	Liechtenstein	0–2	Andorra	Vaduz, Liechtenstein
20:45 UTC+2		Report	Rosas 4'; Cervós 80'	Stadium: Rheinpark Stadion; Attendance: 914; Referee: Juxhin Xhaja (Albania)

25 September 2022–23 UEFA Nations League	Moldova	2–0	Liechtenstein	Chișinău, Moldova
16:00 UTC+3	Stînă 90+2', 90+4'	Report		Stadium: Zimbru Stadium; Attendance: 5,774; Referee: Stéphanie Frappart (France)

16 November Friendly	Gibraltar	2–0	Liechtenstein	Gibraltar
19:00 UTC+1	Chipolina 14'; Walker 21' (pen.)	Report	Malin (red card) 20'	Stadium: Victoria Stadium; Attendance: 558; Referee: Ahmad Al-Ali (Kuwait)

=== 2023 ===
23 March UEFA Euro 2024 qualifying	Portugal	4–0	Liechtenstein	Lisbon, Portugal
20:45 (19:45 UTC±0)	Cancelo 8'; B. Silva 47'; Ronaldo 51' (pen.), 63'	Report		Stadium: Estádio José Alvalade; Attendance: 45,378; Referee: Espen Eskås (Norway)

26 March UEFA Euro 2024 qualifying	Liechtenstein	0–7	Iceland	Vaduz, Liechtenstein
18:00		Report	Ólafsson 3'; Haraldsson 38'; Gunnarsson 48', 68', 73' (pen.); Guðjohnsen 85'; Ellertsson 87'	Stadium: Rheinpark Stadion; Attendance: 1,692; Referee: Jakob Kehlet (Denmark)

17 June UEFA Euro 2024 qualifying	Luxembourg	2–0	Liechtenstein	Luxembourg City, Luxembourg
15:00	Da. Sinani 59'; Rodrigues 89'	Report		Stadium: Stade de Luxembourg; Attendance: 6,806; Referee: Oleksii Derevinskyi (Ukraine)

20 June UEFA Euro 2024 qualifying	Liechtenstein	0–1	Slovakia	Vaduz, Liechtenstein
18:00		Report	Vavro 45+1'	Stadium: Rheinpark Stadion; Attendance: 2,316; Referee: Yigal Frid (Israel)

8 September UEFA Euro 2024 qualifying	Bosnia and Herzegovina	2–1	Liechtenstein	Zenica, Bosnia and Herzegovina
20:45	Džeko 3'; Lüchinger 19' (o.g.)	Report	S. Wolfinger 21'	Stadium: Bilino Polje; Attendance: 6,189; Referee: Sayat Karabayev (Kazakhstan)

11 September UEFA Euro 2024 qualifying	Slovakia	3–0	Liechtenstein	Bratislava, Slovakia
20:45	Hancko 1'; Duda 3'; Mak 6'	Report		Stadium: Tehelné pole Attendance: 13,679; Referee: Sander van der Eijk (Netherlands)

13 October UEFA Euro 2024 qualifying	Liechtenstein	0–2	Bosnia and Herzegovina	Vaduz, Liechtenstein
20:45		Report	Rahmanović 13'; Stevanović 41'	Stadium: Rheinpark Stadion; Attendance: 5,874; Referee: Damian Sylwestrzak (Poland)

16 October UEFA Euro 2024 qualifying	Iceland	4–0	Liechtenstein	Reykjavík, Iceland
18:45	G. Sigurðsson 22' (pen.), 49'; Finnbogason 44'; Haraldsson 63'	Report		Stadium: Laugardalsvöllur; Attendance: 4,317; Referee: Abdulkadir Bitigen (Turkey)

16 November UEFA Euro 2024 qualifying	Liechtenstein	0–2	Portugal	Vaduz, Liechtenstein
20:45		Report	Ronaldo 46'; Cancelo 57'	Stadium: Rheinpark Stadion; Attendance: 5,749; Referee: Mohammed Al-Hakim (Sweden)

19 November UEFA Euro 2024 qualifying	Liechtenstein	0–1	Luxembourg	Vaduz, Liechtenstein
20:45		Report	G. Rodrigues 69'	Stadium: Rheinpark Stadion; Attendance: 2,241; Referee: Stéphanie Frappart (France)

=== 2024 ===
22 March Friendly	Liechtenstein	0–4	Faroe Islands	Marbella, Spain
18:00 UTC+1		Report	P. Petersen 3', 45+1'; Justinussen 49'; A.Svensson 90+2'	Stadium: Marbella Football Center; Attendance: 25; Referee: Jason Lee Barcelo (Gibraltar)

26 March Friendly	Latvia	1–1	Liechtenstein	Larnaca, Cyprus
19:00 UTC+2	Krollis 11'	Report	Ošs 1' (o.g.)	Stadium: Antonis Papadopoulos Stadium; Attendance: 100; Referee: Manfredas Lukjancukas (Lithuania)

3 June Friendly	Albania	3–0	Liechtenstein	Szombathely, Hungary
20:00	Broja 31'; Asani 47'; Muçi 67'	Report		Stadium: Haladás Sportkomplexum; Attendance: 200; Referee: Bence Csonka (Hungary)

8 June Friendly	Romania	0–0	Liechtenstein	Bucharest, Romania
21:00		Report		Stadium: Stadionul Steaua; Attendance: 25,097; Referee: Menelaos Antoniou (Cyprus)

5 September 2024–25 UEFA Nations League	San Marino	1–0	Liechtenstein	Serravalle, San Marino
20:45	Sensoli 53'	Report		Stadium: San Marino Stadium; Attendance: 914; Referee: Andris Treimanis (Latvia)

8 September 2024–25 UEFA Nations League	Gibraltar	2–2	Liechtenstein	Europa Point, Gibraltar
18:00	Walker 8'; Scanlon 90+7'	Report	Saglam 53'; Hasler 90+14' (pen.)	Stadium: Europa Sports Park; Attendance: 681; Referee: Kristo Tohver (Estonia)

10 October Friendly	Liechtenstein	1–0	Hong Kong	Vaduz, Liechtenstein
19:30 UTC+2	Hasler 16'	Report		Stadium: Rheinpark Stadion; Attendance: 1,332; Referee: Désirée Grundbacher (Switzerland)

13 October 2024–25 UEFA Nations League	Liechtenstein	0–0	Gibraltar	Vaduz, Liechtenstein
18:00 UTC+2		Report		Stadium: Rheinpark Stadion; Attendance: 1,510; Referee: Horațiu Feșnic (Romania)

14 November Friendly	Malta	2–0	Liechtenstein	Ta' Qali, Malta
19:00 UTC+1	Degabriele 51'; Büchel 54' (o.g.)	UEFA Soccerway		Stadium: National Stadium; Attendance: 1,139; Referee: Gustavo Correia (Portugal)

18 November 2024–25 UEFA Nations League	Liechtenstein	1–3	San Marino	Vaduz, Liechtenstein
20:45 UTC+1	Sele 40'	Report	Lazzari 46'; Nanni 66' (pen.); Golinucci 76'	Stadium: Rheinpark Stadion; Attendance: 1,157; Referee: Jérémie Pignard (France)

=== 2025 ===
22 March 2026 FIFA World Cup qualification	Liechtenstein	0–3	North Macedonia	Vaduz, Liechtenstein
15:00 UTC+1		Report	Trajkovski 7'; Musliu 42'; Miovski 84'	Stadium: Rheinpark Stadion; Attendance: 4,094; Referee: Mykola Balakin (Ukraine)

25 March 2026 FIFA World Cup qualification	Liechtenstein	0–2	Kazakhstan	Vaduz, Liechtenstein
20:45 UTC+1		Report	Samorodov 42'; Marochkin 45'	Stadium: Rheinpark Stadion; Attendance: 1,123; Referee: John Beaton (Scotland)

6 June 2026 FIFA World Cup qualification	Wales	3–0	Liechtenstein	Cardiff, Wales
19:45 UTC+1	Rodon 40'; Wilson 65'; Moore 68'	Report		Stadium: Cardiff City Stadium; Attendance: 30,646; Referee: Anastasios Papapetrou (Greece)

9 June Friendly	Liechtenstein	0–4	Scotland	Vaduz, Liechtenstein
18:00 UTC+2		Report	Adams 4', 26', 90+2'; Hirst 48'	Stadium: Rheinpark Stadion; Attendance: 4,086; Referee: Julian Weinberger (Austria)

4 September 2026 FIFA World Cup qualification	Liechtenstein	0–6	Belgium	Vaduz, Liechtenstein
20:45 UTC+2		Report	De Cuyper 29'; Tielemans 46', 70' (pen.); Theate 60'; De Bruyne 62'; Fofana 90+1'	Stadium: Rheinpark Stadion; Attendance: 3,158; Referee: Morten Krogh (Denmark)

7 September 2026 FIFA World Cup qualification	North Macedonia	5–0	Liechtenstein	Skopje, North Macedonia
18:00 UTC+2	B. Büchel 15' (o.g.); Bardhi 52'; Churlinov 56'; Qamili 82'; Stankovski 90'	Report		Stadium: Toše Proeski Arena; Attendance: 8,693; Referee: Horațiu Feșnic (Romania)

10 October 2026 FIFA World Cup qualification	Kazakhstan	4–0	Liechtenstein	Astana, Kazakhstan
19:00 UTC+5	Kenzhebek 26', 59'; Zaynutdinov 28'; Kasym 81'	Report		Stadium: Astana Arena; Attendance: 26,539; Referee: Paweł Raczkowski (Poland)

13 October Friendly	Montenegro	2–1	Liechtenstein	Podgorica, Montenegro
18:00 UTC+2	Osmajić 74'; Đukanović 88'	Report	Sele 27'	Stadium: Podgorica City Stadium; Attendance: 1,732; Referee: Igor Stojchevski (North Macedonia)

15 November 2026 FIFA World Cup qualification	Liechtenstein	0–1	Wales	Vaduz, Liechtenstein
18:00 UTC+1		Report	J.James 61'	Stadium: Rheinpark Stadion; Attendance: 5,563; Referee: Juxhin Xhaja (Albania)

18 November 2026 FIFA World Cup qualification	Belgium	7–0	Liechtenstein	Liège, Belgium
20:45 UTC+1	Vanaken 3'; Doku 34', 41'; Mechele 52'; Saelemaekers 55'; De Ketelaere 57', 59'	Report		Stadium: Stade Maurice Dufrasne; Attendance: 26,253; Referee: Mohammed Al-Hakim (Sweden)

=== 2026 ===
26 March 2026 FIFA Series	Tanzania	0–1	Liechtenstein	Kigali, Rwanda
16:30 UTC+2		Report	Sağlam 55'	Stadium: Kigali Pelé Stadium; Attendance: 4,500; Referee: Mohamed Diraneh (Djibouti)

29 March 2026 FIFA Series	Aruba	4–1	Liechtenstein	Kigali, Rwanda
18:00 UTC+2	Romano 19'; Robertha 25'; Breinburg 69'; Hofer 90+4' (o.g.)	Report	Zünd 52'	Stadium: Kigali Pelé Stadium; Referee: Samuel Uwikunda (Rwanda)

4 June Friendly	Andorra	2–0	Liechtenstein	Encamp, Andorra
19:00 UTC+2	Martínez 74'; Aláez 81' (pen.)	Report		Stadium: Estadi de la FAF; Attendance: 1,000; Referee: Javier Alberola Rojas (Spain)

7 June Friendly	Liechtenstein	0–2	Cyprus	Vaduz, Liechtenstein
15:00 (UTC+2)		Report	Tzionis 28'; Sotiriou 70'	Stadium: Rheinpark Stadion; Attendance: 878; Referee: Anojen Kanagasingam (Switzerland)

24 September 2026–27 UEFA Nations League	Liechtenstein	0–2	Lithuania	Vaduz, Liechtenstein
20:45 UTC+2		Report	Michelbrink 53'; Dolžnikov 66'	Stadium: Rheinpark Stadion; Attendance: 1,055; Referee: Ante Čulina (Croatia)

27 September Friendly	Malta	2–0	Liechtenstein	Ta' Qali, Malta
18:30 UTC+2	Grech 37'; Zammit 63'	Report		Stadium: National Stadium; Attendance: 1,953; Referee: Daniyar Sakhi (Kazakhstan)

1 October 2026–27 UEFA Nations League	Azerbaijan	0–0	Liechtenstein	Baku, Azerbaijan
20:00 UTC+4		Report		Stadium: Tofiq Bahramov Republican Stadium; Attendance: 4,200; Referee: Christian-Petru Ciochirca (Austria)

5 October Friendly	Liechtenstein	0–2	Gibraltar	Vaduz, Liechtenstein
20:45 UTC+2		Report	Lopes 20'; Borge 57'	Stadium: Rheinpark Stadion; Attendance: 972; Referee: Luca Cibelli (Switzerland)

13 November 2026–27 UEFA Nations League	Liechtenstein	0–1	Azerbaijan	Vaduz, Liechtenstein
20:45 UTC+1		Report	Emreli 14'	Stadium: Rheinpark Stadion; Attendance: 1,071; Referee: Kristo Tohver (Estonia)

16 November 2026–27 UEFA Nations League	Lithuania	2–1	Liechtenstein	Kaunas, Lithuania
19:00 UTC+2	Jankauskas 16'; Ruzgis 50' (pen.)	Report	Sele 60'	Stadium: Darius and Girėnas Stadium; Attendance: 2,276; Referee: Allard Lindhout (Netherlands)
