= Fabio Luque-Notaro =

Liechtensteiner footballer (born 2005)

Personal information
- Date of birth: 31 August 2005 (age 21)
- Place of birth: Vaduz, Liechtenstein
- Height: 1.78 m (5 ft 10 in)
- Position: Forward

Team information
- Current team: Balzers
- Number: 27

Youth career
- –2021: Balzers
- 2021–2023: Vaduz

Senior career*
Years	Team	Apps	(Gls)
2023–2025	Vaduz II		
2025–2026	Schweinfurt 05	4	(0)
2026–	Balzers	4	(1)

International career^{‡}
2019–2021	Liechtenstein U17	5	(0)
2023	Liechtenstein U19	1	(0)
2022–	Liechtenstein U21	3	(3)
2023–	Liechtenstein	31	(0)
- * Club domestic league appearances and goals as of 20 September 2026 ‡ National team caps and goals as of 16 November 2026

Fabio Luque-Notaro (born 31 August 2005) is a Liechtensteiner footballer who plays as a center-forward for 2. Liga Interregional club Balzers, and the Liechtenstein national team.

== Club career ==
Luque-Notaro was a youth player for Balzers before moving onto Vaduz in 2021, and eventually their reserve team in 2023.

He joined German 3. Liga club Schweinfurt 05 on a free transfer in the summer of 2025.

Following the 2025/2026 season, Luque-Notaro returned to Balzers.

== International career ==
Born in Liechtenstein, Luque-Notaro is of Spanish descent. Luque-Notaro played five matches for the Liechtenstein U-17 national team between 2019 and 2021. He made his debut for the U-21 team in June 2022. On 8 September 2023, he made his debut for the senior national team in a 2–1 defeat to Bosnia and Herzegovina in UEFA Euro 2024 qualifying, coming on as a substitute for Ferhat Saglam in the 73rd minute. In the same month, he made his first appearance for the U-19 team.

== Career statistics ==
=== International ===
As of 16 November 2026

Liechtenstein
Year	Apps	Goals
2023	3	0
2024	8	0
2025	10	0
2026	10	0
Total	31	0
