= Marco Marxer =

Liechtensteiner footballer (born 1999)

Personal information
- Full name: Marco Marxer
- Date of birth: 2 June 1999 (age 27)
- Place of birth: Vaduz, Liechtenstein
- Height: 1.81 m (5 ft 11 in)
- Position: Defender

Youth career
- –2018: Eschen/Mauren

Senior career*
Years	Team	Apps	(Gls)
2018–2021	Eschen/Mauren		
2019–2020	→ Vaduz II (loan)		
2021–2022	Chur 97	16	(0)
2022–2024	Höchst	35	(4)
2024–2025	Balzers	11	(0)

International career^{‡}
2015	Liechtenstein U17	2	(0)
2016	Liechtenstein U19	1	(0)
2019–2020	Liechtenstein U21	4	(0)
2022–	Liechtenstein	4	(0)
- * Club domestic league appearances and goals as of 6 June 2026 ‡ National team caps and goals as of 9 September 2024

Marco Marxer (born 2 June 1999) is a Liechtensteiner footballer who last played for Balzers.

== International career ==
He is a member of the Liechtenstein national football team, making his debut in a 2022–23 UEFA Nations League match against Andorra on 10 June 2022. Marxer also made four appearances for the Liechtenstein U21.
