= Yanik Frick =

Liechtensteiner footballer (born 1998)

Personal information
- Full name: Yanik Frick
- Date of birth: 27 May 1998 (age 28)
- Place of birth: Liestal, Switzerland
- Height: 1.88 m (6 ft 2 in)
- Position: Forward

Youth career
- 2004–2009: Siena
- 2009–2011: St. Gallen
- 2011–2014: Eschen/Mauren
- 2014–2016: St. Gallen
- 2016: Vaduz

Senior career*
Years	Team	Apps	(Gls)
2016–2017	SCR Altach II	23	(5)
2017–2018	Perugia	3	(0)
2018–2019	Livorno	0	(0)
2018	→ Pro Piacenza (loan)	6	(2)
2019–2020	Rapperswil-Jona	14	(5)
2020–2021	Energie Cottbus	2	(0)
2021	PDHAE	1	(0)
2022	Ceahlăul Piatra Neamț	3	(0)
2022–2023	FC Montlingen		

International career
2014–2015	Liechtenstein U17	6	
2015–2016	Liechtenstein U19	6	(3)
2015–2019	Liechtenstein U21	8	(0)
2016–2022	Liechtenstein	30	(3)
- * Club domestic league appearances and goals as of 20:25, 26 June 2023 (UTC)

Yanik Frick (born 27 May 1998) is a Liechtensteiner footballer who plays as a forward.

== Club career ==
Frick began playing football in the academy of AC Siena at age 6 while his father played with the senior team in Serie A. At age four he would practice football with future Italian international Nicolò Zaniolo while his father and Nicolo's father, Igor Zaniolo, played together at Ternana and became good friends. As a youth, he also played for the youth teams of FC Vaduz, FC St. Gallen, and USV Eschen/Mauren.

Frick started his professional career at Austrian club SC Rheindorf Altach in 2016, signing for the reserve squad. His first appearance for the club came against an academy side of FC Zürich, a match in which he impressed his coaches. He also trained with the first team once per week. He scored his first goal for the club on 31 July 2016 against SV Austria Salzburg. In total he scored five goals in twenty three Austrian Regionalliga West appearances for the team.

After leaving Altach, several Italian clubs including Carpi expressed interest in the player. In July 2017, he was signed to a three-year deal by Perugia on a free transfer. Frick made his Serie B debut for the club on 19 September 2017. He made his competitive debut for the club the previous month in a 2–1 Coppa Italia victory over Gubbio on 6 August 2017. In total, Frick made only three league appearances for Perugia after recurring injuries kept him out of the lineup. In January 2018 he was sold to Livorno and signed to a new, longer contract to 2021. He was then immediately loaned to A.S. Pro Piacenza 1919. On 6 March 2018 Frick made his Serie C debut for Pro Piacenza against Cuneo. Seven minutes after entering the match he scored his first goal. He scored his second goal for the club on 7 April 2018 in a match against Pisa. Livorno terminated Frick's contract on 17 November 2018.

After a training stint with FC Vaduz, Frick joined Rapperswil-Jona of the Swiss Challenge League in January 2019 with his contract set to run until 31 June 2021. FC Rapperswil-Jona received clearance for the player to feature for them the following month. The club and player mutually agreed to part ways in September 2020, partially because of the club cutting costs and partly the player's desire to compete at a higher level following the club's relegation. During his final season with the club which was shortened by the COVID-19 pandemic, Frick scored five goals in only nine league matches.

In August 2020 he went on trial with SV Waldhof Mannheim of the German 3. Liga but was not offered a contract despite scoring a goal in a friendly victory over FV Fortuna Heddesheim. Earlier that summer, other 3. Liga clubs were also reportedly interested in signing Frick.

On 6 October 2020, it was announced that Frick had joined Energie Cottbus of the German Regionalliga Nordost for the 2020–21 season. He made his debut for the club on 28 October 2020, coming on as a 74th-minute substitute against FC Carl Zeiss Jena. In summer 2021, Cottbus told the player he was free to find another club, despite having a year left on his contract.

On 1 September 2021 it was announced that Frick had returned to Italy, signing for USD Pont Donnaz Hône Arnad Evançon of Serie D. However, Frick was released less than a month later following the sacking of manager Fabrizio Daidola. He appeared in only one league match for the club before his departure, playing sixty-three minutes of a 0–3 defeat to A.C. Bra on 26 September.

On 9 October 2022 it was announced that Frick would be joining FC Montlingen after the winter break, having been training with the club for about a month. This meant he would be playing alongside his brother Noah for the first time in his senior career.

== International career ==
Frick made eight appearances for the Liechtenstein U21 team between 2015 and 2019.

Frick is a member of the Liechtenstein national football team, making his debut in a 2018 FIFA World Cup qualification match against Albania on 6 October 2016. After being left on the bench as an unused substitute for a 2018 World Cup qualification match against Spain on 5 September 2017, he rashly resigned from the national team at age 19. However, the player quickly apologized to national team manager Rene Pauritsch for his behavior, calling it a "mistake" and vowing to apologize to the full team if he received another call up.

He earned his next cap on 8 June 2019 for a Euro 2020 qualifying match against Armenia under new Liechtenstein manager Helgi Kolviðsson. On 12 October 2019, he scored his first senior goal in the return leg against Armenia in Vaduz.

== Personal life ==
He is the eldest son of former footballer Mario Frick, who is the record goalscorer for the Liechtenstein national football team. Yanik's younger brother, Noah, is also a Liechtenstein international footballer. He and his brother are named after former French tennis player Yannick Noah.

== Career statistics ==
=== International goals ===
Scores and results list Liechtenstein's goal tally first.

No.	Date	Venue	Opponent	Score	Result	Competition
1	12 October 2019	Rheinpark Stadion, Vaduz, Liechtenstein	Armenia	1–1	1–1	UEFA Euro 2020 qualification
2	8 September 2020	Stadio Romeo Neri, Rimini, Italy	San Marino	2–0	2–0	2020–21 UEFA Nations League D
3	31 March 2021	Rheinpark Stadion, Vaduz, Liechtenstein	Iceland	1–3	1–4	2022 FIFA World Cup qualification
Last updated 31 March 2021

As of 14 June 2022

National team	Year	Apps	Goals
Liechtenstein	2016	2	0
Liechtenstein	2017	4	0
Liechtenstein	2018	0	0
Liechtenstein	2019	5	1
Liechtenstein	2020	3	1
Liechtenstein	2021	12	1
Liechtenstein	2022	4	0
Total		30	3
