= Manuel Mikus =

Liechtensteiner footballer (born 1999)

Personal information
- Full name: Manuel Mikus
- Date of birth: 13 July 1999 (age 27)
- Place of birth: Vaduz, Liechtenstein
- Height: 1.86 m (6 ft 1 in)
- Position: Defender

Team information
- Current team: AVV Swift

Youth career
- –2016: Ruggell
- 2016–2017: Vaduz

Senior career*
Years	Team	Apps	(Gls)
2017–2020	Vaduz II		
2020–2024	Balzers	38	(1)
2024–2025	Buochs	12	(1)
2026–	Swift		

International career^{‡}
2014–2015	Liechtenstein U17	6	(0)
2015–2017	Liechtenstein U19	13	(0)
2016–2020	Liechtenstein U21	13	(0)
2022	Liechtenstein	1	(0)
- * Club domestic league appearances and goals as of 6 June 2026 ‡ National team caps and goals as of 21 November 2022

Manuel Mikus (born 13 July 1999) is a Liechtensteiner footballer who currently plays for AVV Swift and the Liechtenstein national team.

== International career ==
He is a member of the Liechtenstein national football team, making his debut in a friendly match against Gibraltar on 16 November 2022. Mikus also made 13 appearances for the Liechtenstein U21.
