= Justin Ospelt =

Liechtenstein footballer (born 1999)

Personal information
- Date of birth: 7 September 1999 (age 27)
- Place of birth: Nassau, Bahamas
- Height: 1.88 m (6 ft 2 in)
- Position: Goalkeeper

Youth career
- –2017: Vaduz

Senior career*
Years	Team	Apps	(Gls)
2017–2023	Vaduz	16	(0)
2021–2022	→ Uerdingen 05 (loan)	5	(0)
2022–2023	→ FC Dornbirn (loan)	24	(0)
2023–2025	FSV Frankfurt	50	(0)
2025–2026	Sportfreunde Siegen	19	(0)

International career^{‡}
2015	Liechtenstein U17	1	(0)
2016–2017	Liechtenstein U19	3	(0)
2018	Liechtenstein U21	2	(0)
2020–	Liechtenstein	12	(0)
- * Club domestic league appearances and goals as of 20 September 2026 ‡ National team caps and goals as of 5 October 2026

Justin Ospelt (born 7 September 1999) is a professional footballer who plays as a goalkeeper. Born in the Bahamas, he represents the Liechtenstein national team.

== Early life ==
Ospelt was born Nassau, Bahamas to Rhonda (née Wilson) and Armin Ospelt. His father is Liechtensteiner and his mother is Afro-Bahamian.

== Club career ==
After joining Vaduz in July 2017, Ospelt signed an extension in January 2021. Ospelt joined Regionalliga side KFC Uerdingen 05 in the summer of 2021. However, he injured a muscle in his knee during his debut for Uerdingen, and had to have surgery. He was sent on another loan on 13 June 2022, joining Austrian Second League club FC Dornbirn.

On 16 June 2023, FSV Frankfurt announced the signing of Ospelt.

== International career ==
Ospelt made his international debut for the Liechtenstein national team on 7 October 2020 in a friendly match against Luxembourg.

== Career statistics ==
=== International ===
As of 5 October 2026

Appearances and goals by national team and year
National team	Year	Apps	Goals
Liechtenstein	2020	1	0
Liechtenstein	2021	1	0
Liechtenstein	2022	2	0
Liechtenstein	2023	0	0
Liechtenstein	2024	1	0
Liechtenstein	2025	2	0
Liechtenstein	2026	5	0
Total		12	0
