= Daniel Hasler =

Liechtenstein footballer (born 1974)

Personal information
- Date of birth: 18 May 1974 (age 52)
- Place of birth: Liechtenstein
- Height: 6 ft 0 in (1.83 m)
- Position: Defender

Senior career*
Years	Team	Apps	(Gls)
1989–2000	Vaduz		
2000–2003	Wil	67	(3)
2003–2008	Vaduz	101	(4)

International career
1993–2008	Liechtenstein	78	(1)

Managerial career
- 2008–2012: Liechtenstein U21 (assistant)
- 2012–2017: Liechtenstein (assistant)
- 2013–2017: Vaduz (assistant)
- 2017: Vaduz (caretaker)
- 2017–2019: Rapperswil-Jona (assistant)
- 2019–2020: Wil (assistant)
- 2020–2021: Basel (assistant)
- * Club domestic league appearances and goals

Daniel Hasler (born 18 May 1974) is a Liechtenstein football coach and former player who works for the Liechtenstein Football Association.

A defender, he is one of the most capped players for the Liechtenstein national team, having appeared 78 times after his debut against Estonia in 1993. He last played for FC Vaduz.

== Coaching career ==
On 27 November 2012, FC Vaduz announced that Hasler from 1 January 2013 would be the new assistant manager of the club under manager Giorgio Contini and continue to exercise in a dual role with his job at the national team.

== Personal life ==
His son is Alessio Hasler, also a Vaduz player and Liechtensteiner international.

== Career statistics ==
#	Date	Venue	Opponent	Score	Result	Competition
1.	20 April 1994	Windsor Stadium, Belfast, Northern Ireland	Northern Ireland	1-4	1-4	1996 European Championship Qualifying

== Honours ==
Individual

- Liechtensteiner Footballer of the Year: 1996–97, 2000–01, 2002–03
