= Noah Frick =

Liechtensteiner footballer (born 2001)

Personal information
- Full name: Noah Zinedine Frick
- Date of birth: 16 October 2001 (age 25)
- Place of birth: Liestal, Switzerland
- Height: 1.88 m (6 ft 2 in)
- Position: Forward

Youth career
- –2018: Vaduz
- –2018: → Schaan (joint registration)

Senior career*
Years	Team	Apps	(Gls)
2018–2020	Vaduz	44	(4)
2020–2021	Neuchâtel Xamax	0	(0)
2021–2022	Brühl	6	(0)
2022	Gossau	8	(0)
2022–2023	Montlingen	0	(0)
2024–2025	Triesenberg		

International career^{‡}
2016–2017	Liechtenstein U17	6	(0)
2016–2017	Liechtenstein U19	6	(1)
2018–2022	Liechtenstein U21	11	(2)
2019–2023	Liechtenstein	20	(2)
- * Club domestic league appearances and goals as of 6 June 2026 ‡ National team caps and goals as of 14:22, 26 March 2023 (UTC)

Noah Zinedine Frick (born 16 October 2001) is a former Liechtensteiner footballer who last played as a forward for FC Triesenberg and the Liechtenstein national team.

== Club career ==
Frick signed for FC Vaduz in 2018 and spent two years at the club under manager and father Mario Frick. In total he made 45 appearances and scored four goals in the Swiss Challenge League over that time. During the 2019–20 season, Vaduz earned promotion to the Swiss Super League just days before the player's contract expired. Although he did not receive a new contract offer from the team, teams from the German 2. Bundesliga had reportedly expressed interest.

On 24 September 2020 it was announced that Frick had signed a two-year contract with Neuchâtel Xamax of the Swiss Challenge League with a club option for an additional season. In July 2021 it was reported that he had joined Swiss Promotion League club SC Brühl during its preseason preparations. The following month it was announced that Frick had officially joined the club for the upcoming season.

In January 2022 it was announced that Frick had signed for FC Gossau of the Swiss 1. Liga.

Frick then moved to Montlingen in the summer of 2022.

In summer 2024 he joined FC Triesenberg.

== International career ==
Frick made his international debut for Liechtenstein on 23 March 2019, coming on as a substitute for Nicolas Hasler in the 86th minute of the UEFA Euro 2020 qualifying home match against Greece, which finished as a 2–0 loss. In June 2019, Frick scored for Liechtenstein's U21s in their first-ever competitive victory as they beat Azerbaijan in 2021 UEFA Euro qualifying; ending a run of fifty-nine straight defeats.

== Personal life ==
Frick is the son of former professional footballer Mario Frick, who is the all-time top scorer for Liechtenstein and four-time Liechtensteiner Footballer of the Year. Noah's older brother, Yanik, is also a Liechtenstein international footballer.

== Career statistics ==
As of 26 March 2023

Liechtenstein
Year	Apps	Goals
2019	2	0
2020	2	1
2021	10	1
2022	6	0
Total	20	2

Scores and results list Liechtenstein's goal tally first.

No.	Date	Venue	Opponent	Score	Result	Competition
1.	17 November 2020	Victoria Stadium, Gibraltar	Gibraltar	1–1	1–1	2020–21 UEFA Nations League D
2.	8 September 2021	Vazgen Sargsyan Republican Stadium, Yerevan, Armenia	Armenia	1–1	1–1	2022 FIFA World Cup qualification

== Honours ==
FC Vaduz

- Liechtenstein Football Cup: 2018–19
