= Lukas Graber =

Liechtenstein footballer

Personal information
- Date of birth: 3 May 2001 (age 25)
- Place of birth: Vaduz, Liechtenstein
- Height: 1.78 m (5 ft 10 in)
- Position: Defender

Team information
- Current team: Schaan
- Number: 16

Youth career
- –2018: Vaduz
- 2017–2018: → St. Gallen (loan)

Senior career*
Years	Team	Apps	(Gls)
2018–2020	Vaduz II		
2020–2023	Eschen/Mauren	27	(0)
2023–2024	CD Almuñécar City	0	(0)
2024–2026	Eschen/Mauren	45	(1)
2026–	Schaan	0	(0)

International career^{‡}
2015–2017	Liechtenstein U17	8	(0)
2017–2018	Liechtenstein U19	8	(0)
2018–	Liechtenstein U21	17	(1)
2022–	Liechtenstein	7	(0)
- * Club domestic league appearances and goals as of 14:20, 6 June 2026 ‡ National team caps and goals as of 21:41, 3 June 2024

Lukas Graber (born 3 May 2001) is a Liechtenstein footballer who plays as a defender for Schaan and the Liechtenstein national team.

== Career ==
Graber made his international debut for Liechtenstein on 3 June 2022 in a friendly match against Moldova.

== Career statistics ==
=== International ===
As of 3 June 2024

Liechtenstein
Year	Apps	Goals
2022	5	0
2023	1	0
2024	1	0
Total	7	0

== Personal life ==
He is the twin brother of Liechtenstein international player Noah Graber.
