= Noah Graber =

Liechtenstein footballer

Personal information
- Full name: Noah Graber
- Date of birth: 3 May 2001 (age 25)
- Place of birth: Vaduz, Liechtenstein
- Position: Left winger

Team information
- Current team: Schaan
- Number: 5

Youth career
- –2018: Vaduz
- 2017–2018: → St. Gallen (loan)

Senior career*
Years	Team	Apps	(Gls)
2018–2020	Vaduz II		
2020–2023	Eschen/Mauren	2	(0)
2023–2025	Altstätten	19	(0)
2025–	Schaan	0	(0)

International career^{‡}
2015–2017	Liechtenstein U17	9	(1)
2017–2018	Liechtenstein U19	7	(0)
2018–	Liechtenstein U21	17	(0)
2020–	Liechtenstein	1	(0)
- * Club domestic league appearances and goals as of 14:22, 6 June 2026 (UTC) ‡ National team caps and goals as of 14:48, 7 June 2022

Noah Graber (born 3 May 2001) is a Liechtenstein footballer who plays as a left winger for Schaan and the Liechtenstein national team.

== Career ==
Graber made his international debut for Liechtenstein on 11 November 2020 in a friendly match against Malta.

== Career statistics ==
=== International ===
As of 11 November 2020

Liechtenstein
Year	Apps	Goals
2020	1	0
Total	1	0

== Personal life ==
He is the twin brother of Liechtenstein international player Lukas Graber.
