= Philipp Gaßner =

Liechtensteiner footballer (born 2003)

Personal information
- Date of birth: 30 August 2003 (age 23)
- Place of birth: Feldkirch, Austria
- Height: 1.85 m (6 ft 1 in)
- Position: Forward

Team information
- Current team: Dornbirner SV

Youth career
- 2009–2017: SV Frastanz
- 2017–2022: AKA Vorarlberg

Senior career*
Years	Team	Apps	(Gls)
2022–2024	Dornbirn	21	(0)
2024–2026	VfB Hohenems	57	(12)
2026–	Dornbirner SV	3	(0)

International career^{‡}
2018–2019	Liechtenstein U17	11	(0)
2020–2022	Liechtenstein U21	7	(0)
2022–	Liechtenstein	7	(0)
- * Club domestic league appearances and goals as of 21:37, 20 September 2026 (UTC) ‡ National team caps and goals as of 09:22, 5 June 2026 (UTC)

Philipp Gaßner (born 30 August 2003) is a Liechtensteiner footballer who plays for Austrian Regionalliga West club Dornbirner SV and the Liechtenstein national team.

== Club career ==
In June 2022 Gaßner left AKA Vorarlberg and signed his first professional contract with FC Dornbirn 1913 of the Austrian 2. Liga. The contract was initially a 2-year deal with a club option for another.

On 6 February 2024, Gaßner moved to VfB Hohenems in Austrian Regionalliga.

In the summer of 2026, he signed with Dornbirner SV.

== International career ==
He is a member of the Liechtenstein national football team, making his debut in a 2022–23 UEFA Nations League match against Latvia on 14 June 2022. Gaßner has also made seven appearances for the Liechtenstein U21 to date.

== Career statistics ==
=== International ===
As of 5 June 2026

Liechtenstein
Year	Apps	Goals
2022	3	0
2023	3	0
2024	0	0
2025	0	0
2026	1	0
Total	7	0
