= Jakob Lorenz =

Liechtensteiner footballer (born 2001)

Personal information
- Full name: Jakob Lorenz
- Date of birth: 11 September 2001 (age 25)
- Place of birth: Bregenz, Austria
- Position: Midfielder

Team information
- Current team: FC Blau-Weiß Feldkirch

Youth career
- –2019: FC Blau-Weiß Feldkirch

Senior career*
Years	Team	Apps	(Gls)
2019–2022	FC Blau-Weiß Feldkirch	15	(0)
2020–2024	Vaduz II		
2024–	FC Blau-Weiß Feldkirch	38	(1)

International career^{‡}
2021–2022	Liechtenstein U21	6	(0)
2022–	Liechtenstein	4	(0)
- * Club domestic league appearances and goals as of 6 June 2026 ‡ National team caps and goals as of 17 October 2023

Jakob Lorenz (born 11 September 2001) is a Liechtensteiner footballer who currently plays for FC Blau-Weiß Feldkirch.

== International career ==
He is a member of the Liechtenstein national football team, making his debut in a 2022–23 UEFA Nations League match against Moldova on 25 September 2022. Lorenz also made six appearances for the Liechtenstein U21.
