= Bürzle =

Bürzle is a Liechtensteiner surname. Notable people with the surname include:

- Erich Bürzle (born 1953), Liechtensteiner former footballer and coach
- Norbert Bürzle (born 1951), Liechtensteiner educator and politician
