= Maximilian Göppel =

Liechtenstein footballer

Personal information
- Full name: Maximilian Göppel
- Date of birth: 31 August 1997 (age 29)
- Place of birth: Vaduz, Liechtenstein
- Height: 1.79 m (5 ft 10 1/2 in)
- Position: Defender

Team information
- Current team: Freienbach
- Number: 33

Youth career
- 2010–2014: Schaan

Senior career*
| Years | Team | Apps | (Gls) |
| 2014–2016 | Balzers | 34 | (0) |
| 2016–2021 | Vaduz | 92 | (1) |
| 2021–2024 | Eschen/Mauren | 52 | (3) |
| 2024–2025 | YF Juventus | 13 | (0) |
| 2025– | Freienbach | 22 | (0) |

International career^{‡}
| 2011–2013 | Liechtenstein U17 | 8 | (0) |
| 2014–2015 | Liechtenstein U19 | 6 | (0) |
| 2014–2017 | Liechtenstein U21 | 9 | (0) |
| 2016– | Liechtenstein | 88 | (2) |
- * Club domestic league appearances and goals as of 6 June 2026 ‡ National team caps and goals as of 16 November 2026

Maximilian Göppel (born 31 August 1997) is a Liechtensteiner footballer who plays as a defender for Swiss 1. Liga club Freienbach and the Liechtenstein national team.

== Club career ==
=== Vaduz ===
On 21 September 2016, he made his debut for Vaduz in Swiss Super League against Young Boys.

=== USV Eschen/Mauren ===
On 25 February 2021, Goeppel moved to USV Eschen/Mauren.

== International career ==
Göppel is a member of the Liechtenstein national football team, making his debut in a friendly match against Iceland on 6 June 2016. Göppel also made nine appearances for the Liechtenstein U21 between 2014 and 2017.

On 9 October 2016, he scored his first goal in a 1–2 away defeat to Israel.

== Career statistics ==
=== International ===
As of 16 November 2026

| National team | Year | Apps | Goals |
|---|---|---|---|
Liechtenstein
| Liechtenstein | 2016 | 5 | 1 |
| Liechtenstein | 2017 | 8 | 0 |
| Liechtenstein | 2018 | 8 | 0 |
| Liechtenstein | 2019 | 9 | 0 |
| Liechtenstein | 2020 | 6 | 0 |
| Liechtenstein | 2021 | 12 | 1 |
| Liechtenstein | 2022 | 3 | 0 |
| Liechtenstein | 2023 | 8 | 0 |
| Liechtenstein | 2024 | 10 | 0 |
| Liechtenstein | 2025 | 9 | 0 |
| Liechtenstein | 2026 | 10 | 0 |
| Total | | 88 | 2 |

==== International goals ====
As of match played 14 November 2021. Liechtenstein score listed first, score column indicates score after each Göppel goal.

International goals by date, venue, cap, opponent, score, result and competition
| No. | Date | Venue | Cap | Opponent | Score | Result | Competition | Ref. |
|---|---|---|---|---|---|---|---|---|
| 1 | 9 October 2016 | Teddy Stadium, Jerusalem, Israel | 5 | Israel | 1–2 | 1–2 | 2018 FIFA World Cup qualification | |
| 2 | 7 June 2021 | Tórsvøllur, Tórshavn, Faroe Islands | 41 | Faroe Islands | 1–0 | 1–5 | Friendly | |

== Personal life ==
He is the older brother of Liechtenstein women's international player Lena Göppel.

== Honours ==
FC Vaduz

- Liechtenstein Football Cup (3): 2016-17, 2017-18, 2018-19

=== Individual ===
- Special prize LFV Award (1): 2017
