= Bruno Poitner =

Liechtenstein footballer (born 2007)

Personal information
- Date of birth: 22 March 2007 (age 19)
- Place of birth: Germany
- Height: 1.82 m (6 ft 0 in)
- Position: Midfielder

Team information
- Current team: SV Fellbach
- Number: 9

Youth career
- –2026: SV Fellbach

Senior career*
Years	Team	Apps	(Gls)
2026–	SV Fellbach	8	(0)

International career^{‡}
2024–2025	Liechtenstein U19	7	(0)
2026–	Liechtenstein	7	(0)
- * Club domestic league appearances and goals as of 31 October 2026 ‡ National team caps and goals as of 16 November 2026

Bruno Poitner (born 22 March 2007) is a footballer who plays as a midfielder for SV Fellbach. Born in Germany, he is a Liechtenstein international.

== Early life ==
Poitner was born on 22 March 2007 in Germany. Born to a Liechtensteiner father and a German mother, he obtained Liechtenstein citizenship and German citizenship. Growing up, he studied sports science.

== Club career ==
As a youth player, Poitner joined the youth academy of German side SV Fellbach and was promoted to the club's senior team in 2026.

== International career ==
Poitner is a Liechtenstein international. Altogether, he made five appearances and scored zero goals while playing for the Liechtenstein national under-19 football team.

On 4 June 2026, he debuted for the Liechtenstein national football team during a 0–2 away friendly loss to the Andorra national football team. During September and October 2026, he played for the Liechtenstein national football team in the 2026–27 UEFA Nations League.
