= Fünfstück =

Fünfstück is a German surname. Notable people with the surname include:

- Konrad Fünfstück (born 1980), German football manager and former player
- Laura Fünfstück (born 1994), German golfer
