= Alessio Hasler =

Liechtensteiner footballer (born 2005)

Personal information
- Date of birth: 7 July 2005 (age 21)
- Height: 1.86 m (6 ft 1 in)
- Position: Midfielder

Team information
- Current team: FV Illertissen
- Number: 5

Youth career
- –2020: Eschen/Mauren
- 2020–2025: Vaduz

Senior career*
Years	Team	Apps	(Gls)
2025–2026	Vaduz	3	(1)
2026–	FV Illertissen	10	(1)

International career^{‡}
2019–2021	Liechtenstein U17	8	(0)
2023	Liechtenstein U19	4	(0)
2022	Liechtenstein U21	1	(0)
2023–2024	Liechtenstein U23	3	(0)
2024–	Liechtenstein	18	(0)
- * Club domestic league appearances and goals as of 27 September 2026 ‡ National team caps and goals as of 16:20, 16 November 2026 (UTC)

Alessio Hasler (born 7 July 2005) is a Liechtensteiner professional footballer who plays as a midfielder for German Regionalliga Bayern club FV Illertissen and the Liechtenstein national team.

== Club career ==
Hasler began his career with Eschen/Mauren before moving to Vaduz in 2020. In the spring of 2025, he signed a two-year professional contract with the capital club in Liechtenstein. Hasler made his senior debut on 10 August 2025 against Stade Nyonnais.

== International career ==
Hasler made his debut for the Liechtenstein national team on 3 June 2024 in a friendly against Albania.

=== International statistics ===
As of match played 16 November 2026

Liechtenstein
Year	Apps	Goals
2024	2	0
2025	6	0
2026	10	0
Total	18	0

== Personal life ==
He is the son of former Vaduz and Wil player and Liechtenstein international Daniel Hasler, who earned 78 caps for the national side between 1993 and 2008.
