= 2004–05 BSC Young Boys season =

Young Boys
2004–05 season
- Chairman: Peter Mast
- Manager: Hans-Peter Zaugg
- Stadium: Wankdorf Stadium
- Swiss Super League: 4th
- Swiss Cup: Semi-finals
- UEFA Champions League: Second qualifying round
- Top goalscorer: League: Stéphane Chapuisat (15); All: Stéphane Chapuisat (15)
- Average home league attendance: 7,385
- Biggest win: Martigny 0–6 Young Boys

The 2004–05 BSC Young Boys season was the club's 107th season in existence and the club's fourth consecutive season in the top flight of Swiss football. In addition to the domestic league, Young Boys participated in this season's editions of the Swiss Cup and the UEFA Champions League.

== Pre-season and friendlies ==
Win Draw Loss

During pre-season, the team competed in the Burkhalter Cup, winning both games to claim the title.

19 June 2004 Friendly	Young Boys (Switzerland)	3–2	(Switzerland) Zürich	Bern
CEST (UTC+2)				Attendance: 1,000; Referee: Cyril Zimmermann

2 July 2004 Burkhalter Cup	Young Boys (Switzerland)	1–0	(Switzerland) Wohlen	Bern
CEST (UTC+2)	Carrera 31'

2 July 2004 Burkhalter Cup	Young Boys (Switzerland)	1–0	(Ukraine) Shakhtar Donetsk	Bern
CEST (UTC+2)	Rochat 31'

== Competitions ==
=== Overall record ===
Competition	First match	Last match	Starting round	Final position	Record							
Competition	First match	Last match	Starting round	Final position	Pld	W	D	L	GF	GA	GD	Win %
Swiss Super League	17 July 2004	29 May 2005	Matchday 1	4th	34	12	13	9	60	52	+8	35.29
Swiss Cup	17 September 2004	20 April 2005	Round of 64	Semi-finals	5	4	0	1	12	4	+8	80.00
UEFA Champions League	28 July 2004	4 August 2004	Second qualifying round	Second qualifying round	2	0	1	1	2	5	−3	0.00
Total					41	16	14	11	74	61	+13	39.02

Source: Competitions

=== Swiss Super League ===
Note: It should be mentioned that Young Boys and Servette were scheduled to play two matches, but they were canceled after Servette withdrew from the league at the conclusion of the first round.

==== League table ====
Pos	Team	Pld	W	D	L	GF	GA	GD	Pts	Qualification or relegation
2	Thun	34	18	6	10	69	42	+27	60	Qualification to Champions League second qualifying round
3	Grasshopper	34	12	14	8	51	50	+1	50	Qualification to UEFA Cup second qualifying round
4	Young Boys	34	12	13	9	60	52	+8	49	Qualification to Intertoto Cup second round
5	Zürich	34	13	9	12	55	57	−2	48	Qualification to UEFA Cup second qualifying round (Note: via 2004–05 Swiss Cup)
6	Neuchâtel Xamax	34	10	8	16	36	48	−12	38	Qualification to Intertoto Cup first round

Source: RSSSF
Rules for classification: 1) points; 2) goal difference; 3) number of goals scored.

==== Results summary ====
Overall								Home						Away					
Pld	W	D	L	GF	GA	GD	Pts	W	D	L	GF	GA	GD	W	D	L	GF	GA	GD
0	0	0	0	0	0	0	0	0	0	0	0	0	0	0	0	0	0	0	0

==== Results by round ====
Round	1	2	3	4	5	6	7	8	9	10	11	12	13	14	15	16	17	18	19	20	21	22	23	24	25	26	27	28	29	30	31	32	33	34	35	36
Ground	A	H	H	A	H	A	H	A	A	H	A	A	H	A	H	A	H	H	H	A	A	H	A	H	H	B	H	A	B	A	A	H	A	H	A	H
Result	D	W	D	L	D	W	D	W	L	L	D	W	W	L	D	L	L	W	L	D	W	D	W	W	L	B	L	D	B	D	W	D	D	W	D	W
Position	3	3	4	5	6	4	4	3	3	5	5	3	3	4	4	5	6	5	5	5	5	5	4	4	4	6	6	5	6	5	4	4	4	4	4	4

A = Away; H = Home; W = Win; D = Draw; L = Loss

==== Matches ====
17 July 2004 1	St. Gallen	3–3	Young Boys	St. Gallen
CEST (UTC+2)

23 July 2004 2	Young Boys	6–1	Schaffhausen	Bern
CEST (UTC+2)				Stadium: Wankdorf Stadium

7 August 2004 4	Thun	3–1	Young Boys	Thun
CEST (UTC+2)

15 August 2004 5	Young Boys	1–1	Basel	Bern
CEST (UTC+2)				Stadium: Wankdorf Stadium

21 August 2004 6	Aarau	1–3	Young Boys	Aarau
CEST (UTC+2)

25 August 2004 3	Young Boys	1–1	Grasshopper	Bern
CEST (UTC+2)				Stadium: Wankdorf Stadium

29 August 2004 7	Young Boys	1–1	Servette	Bern
CEST (UTC+2)				Stadium: Wankdorf Stadium

11 September 2004 8	Zürich	2–3	Young Boys	Zürich
CEST (UTC+2)

22 September 2004 9	Neuchâtel Xamax	3–1	Young Boys	Xamax
CEST (UTC+2)

25 September 2004 10	Young Boys	0–1	St. Gallen	Bern
CEST (UTC+2)				Stadium: Wankdorf Stadium

3 October 2004 11	Schaffhausen	1–1	Young Boys	Schaffhausen
CEST (UTC+2)

17 October 2004 12	Grasshopper	0–1	Young Boys	Zürich
CEST (UTC+2)

31 October 2004 13	Young Boys	2–1	Thun	Bern
CET (UTC+1)				Stadium: Wankdorf Stadium

7 November 2004 14	Basel	2–1	Young Boys	Basel
CET (UTC+1)

14 November 2004 15	Young Boys	1–1	Aarau	Bern
CET (UTC+1)				Stadium: Wankdorf Stadium

28 November 2004 16	Servette	2–1	Young Boys	Geneva
CET (UTC+1)

5 December 2004 17	Young Boys	2–4	Zürich	Bern
CET (UTC+1)				Stadium: Wankdorf Stadium

12 December 2004 18	Young Boys	2–1	Neuchâtel Xamax	Bern
CET (UTC+1)				Stadium: Wankdorf Stadium

27 February 2005 20	Grasshopper	1–1	Young Boys	Zürich
CEST (UTC+2)

13 March 2005 23	Zürich	0–5	Young Boys	Zürich
CET (UTC+1)

16 March 2005 24	Young Boys	1–0	Neuchâtel Xamax	Bern
CET (UTC+1)				Stadium: Wankdorf Stadium

20 March 2005 25	Young Boys	2–3	St. Gallen	Bern
CET (UTC+1)				Stadium: Wankdorf Stadium

6 April 2005 21	Schaffhausen	0–1	Young Boys	Schaffhausen
CEST (UTC+2)

10 April 2005 27	Young Boys	2–5	Basel	Bern
CEST (UTC+2)				Stadium: Wankdorf Stadium

14 April 2005 19	Young Boys	2–4	Thun	Bern
CEST (UTC+2)				Stadium: Wankdorf Stadium

17 April 2005 28	Basel	1–1	Young Boys	Basel
CEST (UTC+2)

23 April 2005 30	St. Gallen	2–2	Young Boys	St. Gallen
CEST (UTC+2)

27 April 2005 22	Young Boys	1–1	Aarau	Bern
CEST (UTC+2)				Stadium: Wankdorf Stadium

1 May 2005 31	Neuchâtel Xamax	0–1	Young Boys	Xamax
CEST (UTC+2)

8 May 2005 32	Young Boys	1–1	Zürich	Bern
CEST (UTC+2)				Stadium: Wankdorf Stadium

11 May 2005 33	Thun	1–1	Young Boys	Thun
CEST (UTC+2)

18 May 2005 34	Young Boys	3–2	Grasshopper	Bern
CEST (UTC+2)				Stadium: Wankdorf Stadium

22 May 2005 35	Aarau	1–1	Young Boys	Aarau
CEST (UTC+2)

29 May 2005 36	Young Boys	4–1	Schaffhausen	Bern
CEST (UTC+2)				Stadium: Wankdorf Stadium

=== Swiss Cup ===
17 September 2004 Round 1	FC Martigny-Sports	0–6	Young Boys	Martigny
14:30 CEST (UTC+2)

23 October 2004 Round 2	Wohlen	0–1	Young Boys	Wohlen
CEST (UTC+2)				Stadium: Stadion Niedermatten

20 November 2004 Round 3	Sion	1–2	Young Boys	Sion
CET (UTC+1)				Stadium: Stade Tourbillon

13 February 2005 Quarter-finals	Young Boys	2–0	Thun	Bern
14:30 CET (UTC+1)				Stadium: Stadion Neufeld

20 April 2005 Semi-finals	Zürich	3–1	Young Boys	Zürich
20:15 CEST (UTC+2)				Stadium: Letzigrund

=== UEFA Champions League ===
==== Second qualifying round ====
28 July 2004 First leg	Young Boys (Switzerland)	2–2	(Serbia and Montenegro) Red Star Belgrade	Hardturm, Zürich (Note: Young Boys played their home match at Hardturm stadium in Zürich, instead of their regular home venue Stadion Neufeld in Bern.)
20:15	Chapuisat 6'; Eugster 65'	Report	Žigić 79', 88'	Attendance: 10,350; Referee: Pieter Vink (Netherlands)

4 August 2004 Second leg	Red Star Belgrade (Serbia and Montenegro)	3–0	(Switzerland) Young Boys	Red Star Stadium, Belgrade
20:15	Miladinović 39'; Dudić 49'; Žigić 69'	Report		Attendance: 38,500; Referee: Damien Ledentu (France)

Red Star Belgrade won 5–2 on aggregate.
