= Nicolas Hasler =

Liechtensteiner professional footballer (born 1991)

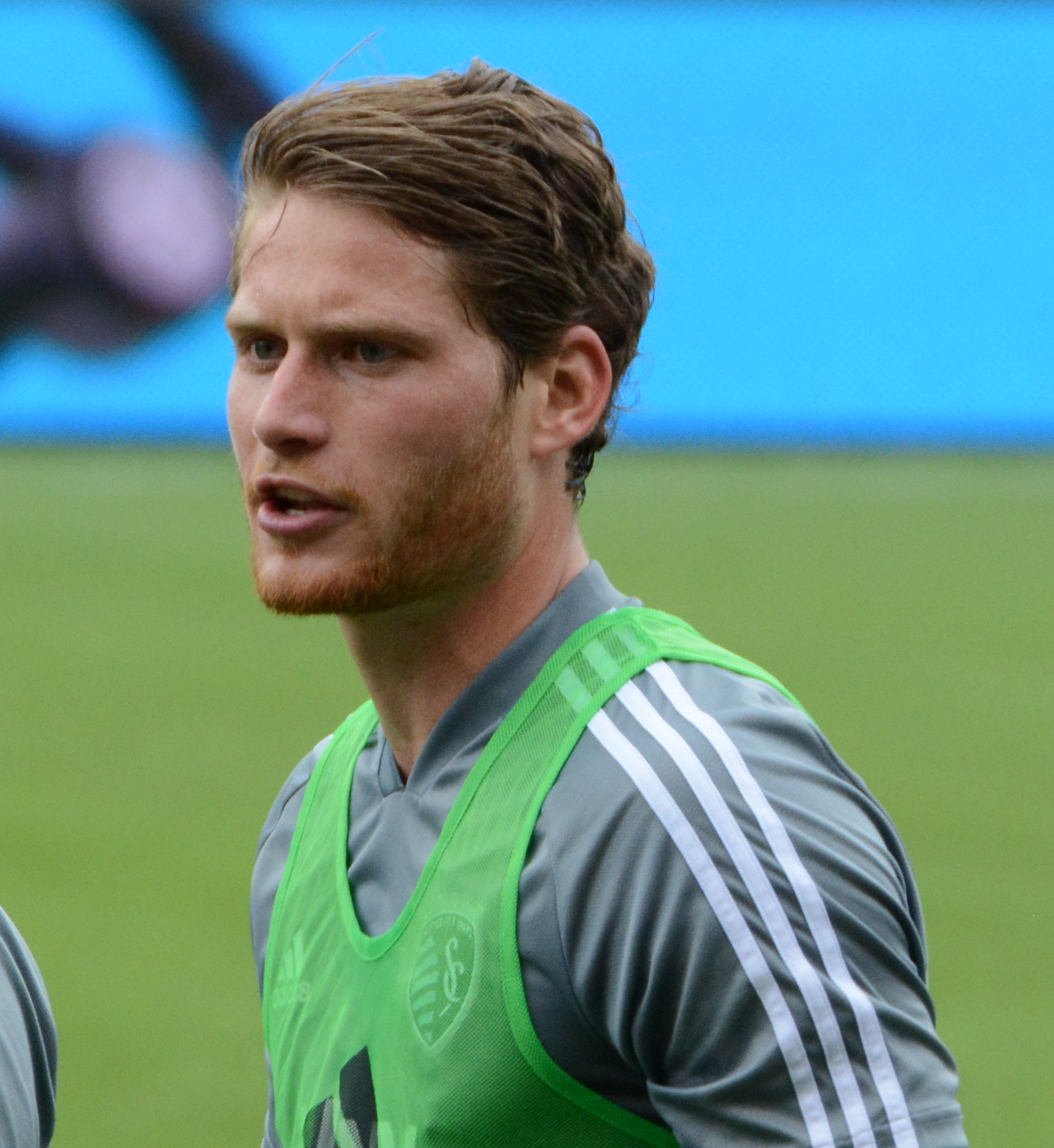
- Hasler with Sporting Kansas City in 2019

Personal information
- Full name: Nicolas Hasler
- Date of birth: 4 May 1991 (age 35)
- Place of birth: Vaduz, Liechtenstein
- Height: 1.78 m (5 ft 10 in)
- Position: Midfielder

Team information
- Current team: Vaduz
- Number: 4

Youth career
- 2001–2003: Triesen
- 2003–2009: Balzers

Senior career*
Years	Team	Apps	(Gls)
2009–2010	Balzers	18	(4)
2010–2011	Eschen/Mauren	21	(3)
2011–2017	Vaduz	136	(10)
2017–2018	Toronto FC	24	(3)
2018–2019	Chicago Fire	13	(0)
2019	Sporting Kansas City	9	(0)
2020–2022	Thun	75	(7)
2022–	Vaduz	102	(9)

International career^{‡}
2009	Liechtenstein U19	3	(0)
2009–2012	Liechtenstein U21	10	(0)
2010–	Liechtenstein	114	(7)
- * Club domestic league appearances and goals as of 28 September 2026 ‡ National team caps and goals as of 1 October 2026

Nicolas Hasler (born 4 May 1991) is a Liechtensteiner professional footballer who plays as a midfielder for Liechtensteiner Swiss Super League club Vaduz and captains the Liechtenstein national team. He is the son of Rainer Hasler, who was one of Liechtenstein's greatest professional footballers.

== Club career ==
=== FC Triesen & FC Balzers ===
Hasler began his youth career with FC Triesen and moved onto FC Balzers youth side in 2003.

=== FC Vaduz ===
In June 2017, Hasler left Vaduz, a club he had been with for the previous six seasons, after he was unable to come to terms with the club over a new contract.

=== Toronto FC ===
On 13 July 2017 Hasler signed with Toronto FC of Major League Soccer. In the first season with Toronto, he won the MLS Cup and MLS Supporters Shield, and reached the 2018 CONCACAF Champions League final, which Toronto lost on penalties.

=== Chicago Fire ===
On 20 July 2018, Hasler was traded to Chicago Fire in exchange for Jon Bakero and $50,000 in General Allocation Money.

On 28 March 2019, Hasler was released by Chicago.

=== Sporting Kansas City ===
On 2 April 2019, Hasler was signed by Sporting Kansas City. The club placed him on waivers at the end of the season, but he was not signed by any other MLS club.

=== FC Thun ===
Hasler joined Swiss club FC Thun for the remainder of the season on 14 January 2020. However, the club failed to stave off relegation to the Challenge League and Hasler was released. However, Hasler would later return to Thun on a one-year deal.

=== Return to FC Vaduz ===
On 18 May 2022, it was announced that Hasler was returning to Vaduz on a three-year deal.

== International career ==
Hasler was a member of the Liechtenstein U21 and had 10 caps. He received his first call-up to the senior team and made his debut in the friendly versus Iceland on 11 August 2010. In March 2021, head coach Martin Stocklasa announced Hasler's captaincy during a press conference prior to the World Cup qualification. On 22 March 2025, Hasler featured in his 100th international match for Liechtenstein against North Macedonia during the 2026 FIFA World Cup qualification.

== Career statistics ==
=== Club ===
As of 18 November 2025

Appearances and goals by club, season and competition
Club	Season	League			National Cup		Continental (Note: Includes UEFA Europa League and UEFA Conference League matches.) (Note: Includes CONCACAF Champions League matches.)		Other		Total	
Club	Season	Division	Apps	Goals	Apps	Goals	Apps	Goals	Apps	Goals	Apps	Goals
FC Vaduz	2011–12	Swiss Challenge League	18	1	2	0	2	0	—		22	1
FC Vaduz	2012–13	Swiss Challenge League	21	2	3	0	0	0	—		24	2
FC Vaduz	2013–14	Swiss Challenge League	32	5	3	2	2	0	—		37	7
FC Vaduz	2014–15	Swiss Super League	25	1	1	1	1	1	—		27	3
FC Vaduz	2015–16	Swiss Super League	9	0	1	1	3	0	—		13	1
FC Vaduz	2016–17	Swiss Super League	31	1	1	0	3	0	—		35	1
FC Vaduz	Total		136	10	11	4	11	1	—		158	15
Toronto FC	2017	MLS	12	3	0	0	0	0	2	0	12	3
Toronto FC	2018	MLS	14	0	1	0	5	0	0	0	20	0
Toronto FC	Total		24	3	1	0	5	0	2	0	32	3
Chicago Fire	2018	MLS	10	0	1	0	0	0	—		11	3
Chicago Fire	2019	MLS	3	0	0	0	0	0	—		3	0
Chicago Fire	Total		13	0	1	0	0	0	—		14	0
Sporting KC	2019	MLS	9	0	0	0	0	0	—		9	0
FC Thun	2019–20	Swiss Super League	20	0	0	0	0	0	—		20	0
FC Thun	2020–21	Swiss Challenge League	24	3	0	0	0	0	—		24	3
FC Thun	2021–22	Swiss Challenge League	33	4	2	0	2	0	—		37	4
FC Thun	Total		77	7	2	0	2	0	—		81	7
FC Vaduz	2022–23	Swiss Challenge League	31	3	2	1	12	1	—		45	5
FC Vaduz	2023–24	Swiss Challenge League	1	0	1	0	0	0	—		2	0
FC Vaduz	2024–25	Swiss Challenge League	31	1	2	0	2	0	—		35	1
FC Vaduz	2025–26	Swiss Challenge League	13	4	1	0	3	1	—		17	5
FC Vaduz	Total		76	8	6	1	17	2	—		99	11
Career total			337	28	21	5	35	3	2	0	392	36

=== International ===
As of 1 October 2026

Liechtenstein
Year	Apps	Goals
2010	3	0
2011	7	0
2012	7	0
2013	9	1
2014	7	0
2015	5	0
2016	5	0
2017	6	1
2018	8	1
2019	10	0
2020	6	2
2021	9	0
2022	9	0
2023	3	0
2024	5	2
2025	10	0
2026	5	0
Total	114	7

==== International goals ====
No.	Date	Venue	Opponent	Score	Result	Competition
1.	11 October 2013	Bilino Polje, Zenica, Bosnia and Herzegovina	Bosnia and Herzegovina	1–4	1–4	2014 FIFA World Cup qualification
2.	7 June 2017	Veritas Stadion, Turku, Finland	Finland	1–1	1–1	Friendly
3.	19 November 2018	Rheinpark Stadion, Vaduz, Liechtenstein	Armenia	2–1	2–2	2018–19 UEFA Nations League D
4.	8 September 2020	Stadio Romeo Neri, Rimini, Italy	San Marino	1–0	2–0	2020–21 UEFA Nations League D
5.	7 October 2020	Stade Josy Barthel, Luxembourg City, Luxembourg	Luxembourg	2–0	2–1	Friendly
6.	8 September 2024	Europa Point Stadium, Gibraltar	Gibraltar	2–2	2–2	2024–25 UEFA Nations League D
7.	10 October 2024	Rheinpark Stadion, Vaduz, Liechtenstein	Hong Kong	1–0	1–0	Friendly

== Honours ==
Vaduz

- Swiss Challenge League: 2013–14
- Liechtensteiner Cup: 2012–13, 2013–14, 2014–15, 2015–16, 2016–17

Toronto

- MLS Cup: 2017
- Supporters' Shield: 2017
- Canadian Championship: 2018
- CONCACAF Champions League runner-up: 2018

Individual

- Liechtensteiner Footballer of the Year: 2015, 2017, 2018
- Liechtensteiner Young Player of the Year: 2011, 2012

== See also ==
- List of men's footballers with 100 or more international caps
