= Jens Hofer =

Liechtenstein footballer (born 1997)

Personal information
- Full name: Jens Hofer
- Date of birth: 1 October 1997 (age 29)
- Place of birth: Liechtenstein
- Height: 1.88 m (6 ft 2 in)
- Position: Left back

Team information
- Current team: Düdingen
- Number: 25

Youth career
- FC Aarberg
- 2013–2015: Young Boys

Senior career*
Years	Team	Apps	(Gls)
2015–2016	Young Boys II	1	(0)
2016–2018	Düdingen	15	(0)
2018–2019	Münsingen	10	(0)
2019–2020	Vaduz	2	(0)
2020–2023	Biel-Bienne	21	(3)
2023	Solothurn	4	(0)
2023–2024	Ares	0	(0)
2024	Solothurn	0	(0)
2024–	Düdingen	27	(1)

International career^{‡}
2014–2015	Liechtenstein U19	5	(1)
2014–2018	Liechtenstein U21	22	(0)
2018–	Liechtenstein	51	(0)
- * Club domestic league appearances and goals as of 6 June 2026 ‡ National team caps and goals as of 16 November 2026

Jens Hofer (born 1 October 1997) is a Liechtensteiner footballer who plays as a left back for Düdingen and the Liechtenstein national team.

== International career ==
Hofer made his international debut for Liechtenstein on 19 November 2018, starting in the 2018–19 UEFA Nations League D match against Armenia, which finished as a 2–2 home draw. On 11 November 2021, during a World Cup qualifier against Germany, Hofer was given a red card for a horror challenge on Leon Goretzka. Hofer's boot made contact with Goretzka's face after both of them went for a cross from Jonas Hofmann.

== Career statistics ==
=== International ===
As of 16 November 2026

Liechtenstein
Year	Apps	Goals
2018	1	0
2019	5	0
2020	4	0
2021	11	0
2022	5	0
2023	7	0
2024	0	0
2025	9	0
2026	9	0
Total	51	0
