= Helgi Kolviðsson =

Icelandic footballer and manager

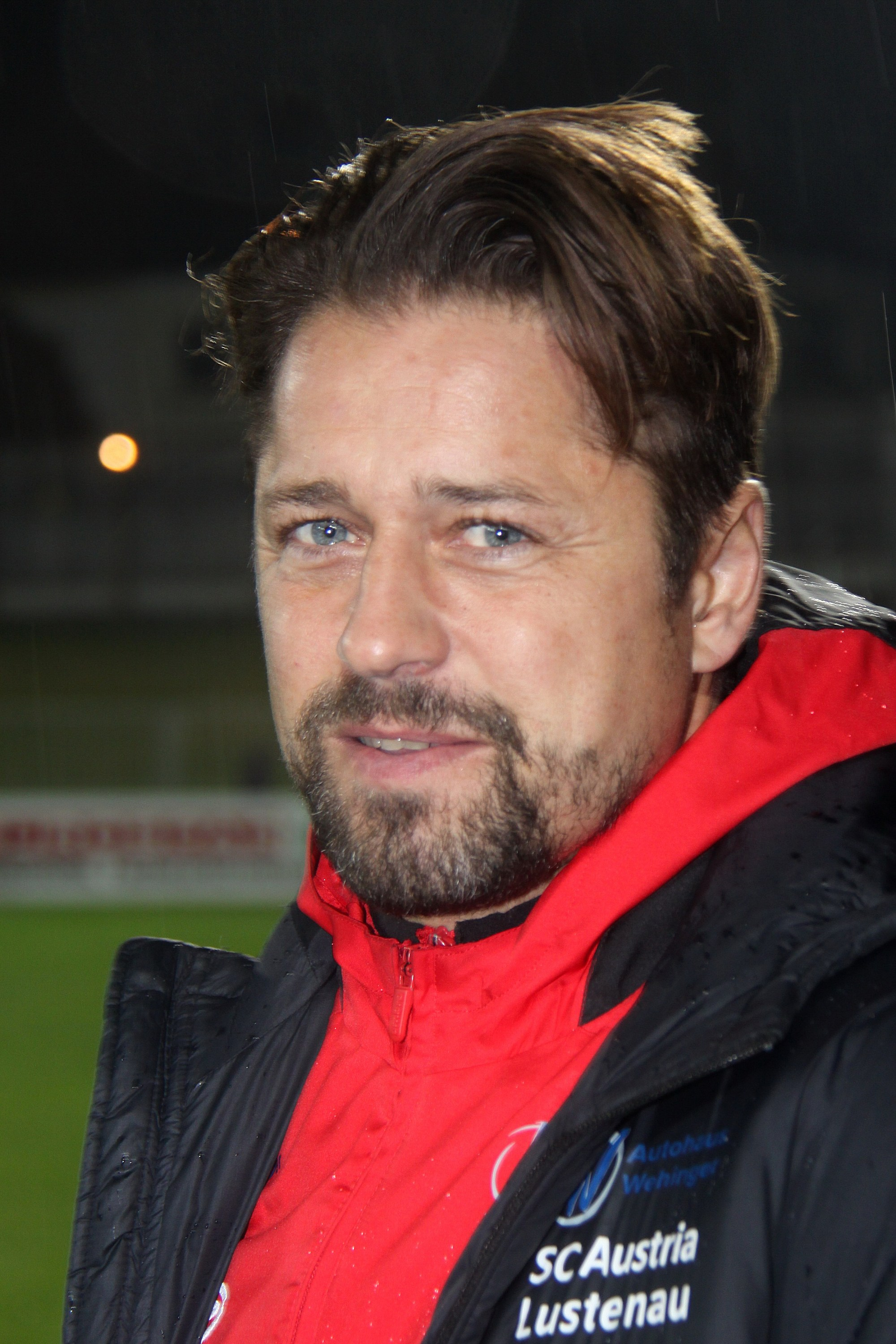

Personal information
- Full name: Helgi Kolviðsson
- Date of birth: 13 September 1971 (age 55)
- Place of birth: Reykjavík, Iceland
- Height: 1.80 m (5 ft 11 in)
- Position: Defender

Team information
- Current team: SC Pfullendorf (Head of Sport and Organisation)

Senior career*
Years	Team	Apps	(Gls)
1988–1991	ÍK	34	(4)
1992–1994	HK	51	(22)
1995–1996	SC Pfullendorf	30	(2)
1996–1998	SC Austria Lustenau	55	(2)
1998–2000	1. FSV Mainz 05	61	(0)
2000–2001	SSV Ulm 1846	29	(2)
2001–2004	FC Kärnten	77	(5)
2004–2007	SC Pfullendorf	56	(0)
Total		393	(37)

International career
1993	Iceland U21	2	(0)
1996–2003	Iceland	29	(0)

Managerial career
- 2008: SC Pfullendorf
- 2010–2011: SC Pfullendorf
- 2011–2014: Austria Lustenau
- 2014–2015: SC Wiener Neustadt
- 2015: SV Ried
- 2016–2018: Iceland (assistant)
- 2018–2020: Liechtenstein
- 2022–: SC Pfullendorf (Head of Sport and Organisation)
- * Club domestic league appearances and goals

Helgi Kolviðsson (born 13 September 1971) is an Icelandic former footballer who played as a defender. He is currently the Head of Sport and Organisation at SC Pfullendorf.

== Club career ==
He started his career with now defunct side ÍK in 1988, but when the club folded due to financial difficulties in 1991 Helgi transferred, with most of the side's players, to the newly created football division of the town's handball side, HK, and played there for a few seasons before moving abroad, becoming one of Iceland's few international footballers that have played in Iceland's lower leagues but never in the top league. Helgi spent the 1995–96 season with German side SC Pfullendorf, scoring twice in 30 matches, before joining Austrian club SC Austria Lustenau. In two seasons, he made 55 league appearances, netting twice. In 2000, he returned to Germany with 1. FSV Mainz 05 and spent two years with the Bundesliga outfit, during which time he played 61 games.

Helgi joined SSV Ulm 1846 for the 2000–01 campaign, before returning to Austria with FC Kärnten, where he made 77 appearances and scored five goals in three seasons. He ended his playing career with a second spell at Pfullendorf, playing 56 league matches between 2004 and 2007.

== International career ==
During the 1993 season, Helgi won two caps for the Iceland under-21 team, making his debut as a second-half substitute for Þórður Guðjónsson in the 2–1 win against Hungary on 15 June 1993. Three years later, he won his first senior international cap for Iceland, replacing Ólafur Þórðarson in the 0–3 away defeat to Russia on 9 February 1996. Over the next seven years, Helgi played a further 28 matches for his country before making his final appearance in the 0–0 friendly draw with Mexico on 20 November 2003.

== Managerial career ==
Before the 2007–08 season, Helgi was appointed as an assistant manager at SC Pfullendorf. After the dismissal of Michael Feichtenbeiner in April 2008, he briefly took over as caretaker manager, but couldn't continue with the team after the season as he lacked a UEFA 'A' licence. From 2008 to 2010, he served again as an assistant coach under head coach Walter Schneck while acquiring his UEFA 'A' Licence. For the 2010–11 season, he was appointed head coach of the club but left at the end of the season to take over as head coach of the Austrian Football First League side Austria Lustenau. Austria Lustenau finished the 2012–13 season in the third place.

On 2 June 2015, it was announced that Helgi would be taking over as Head coach of SV Ried for the 2015–16 season.

On 5 August 2016 Helgi was announced as the assistant manager of the Icelandic national team, assisting manager Heimir Hallgrímsson.

On 18 December 2018, Liechtenstein announced the hiring of Kolviðsson as their new manager, succeeding Rene Pauritsch. He left the Liechtenstein job after the November 2020 international window, after failing to agree a new contract with the Liechtenstein FA (LFV)

On 23 April 2022, it was announced that Helgi would be joining his former club SC Pfullendorf for the 5th time in his career, this time as the Head of Sport & Organisation, starting from 1 May 2022. His role includes "squad planning, scouting and the organization of the first team at the sports club"

== Managerial statistics ==
As of Match played 17 November 2020

Team	From	To	Record				
Team	From	To	G	W	D	L	Win %
Liechtenstein	December 2018	November 2020	16	2	4	10	12.50
