= Rene Pauritsch =

Austrian footballer and manager

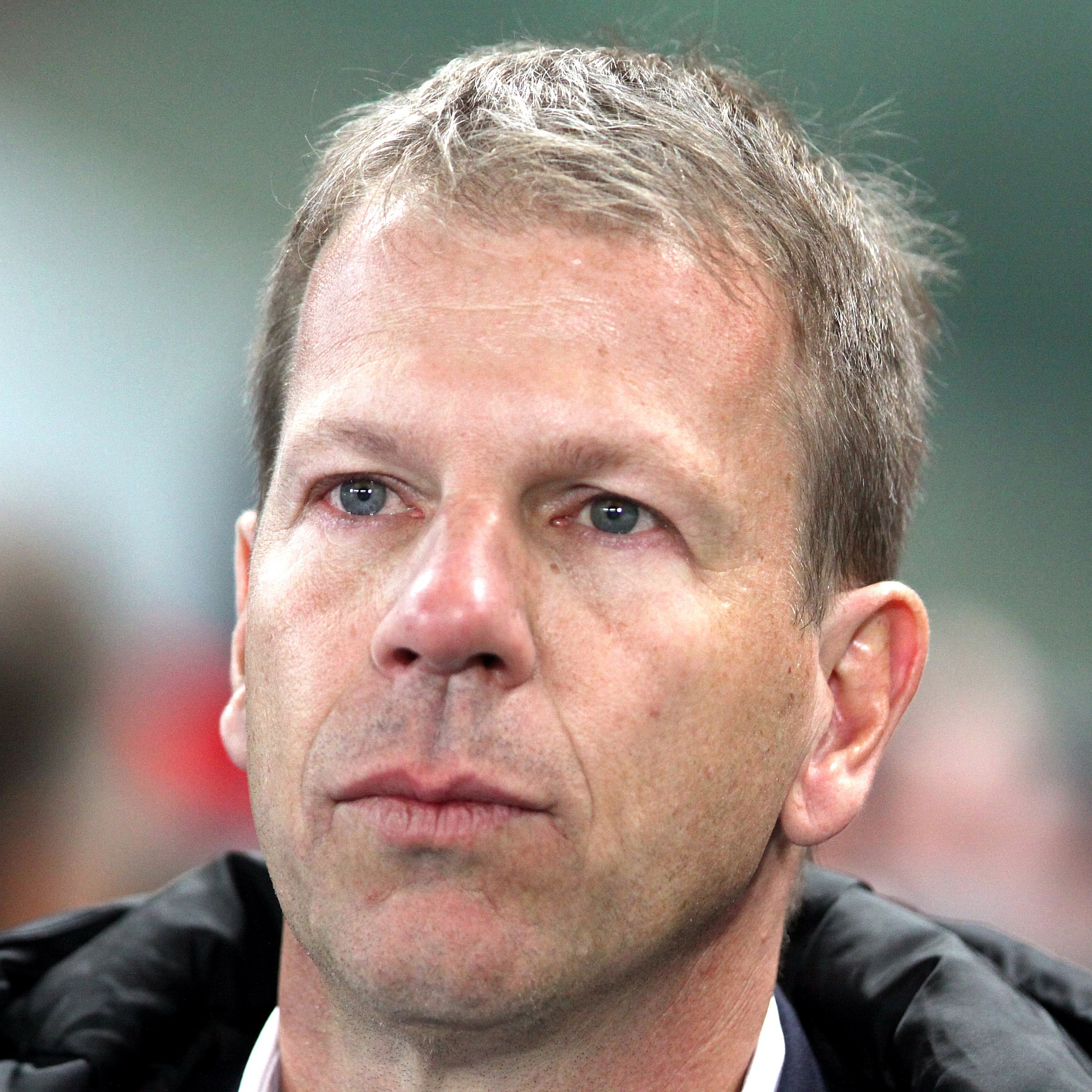
- Pauritsch in 2015

Personal information
- Date of birth: 4 February 1964 (age 62)
- Place of birth: Vienna, Austria
- Position: Forward

Senior career*
Years	Team	Apps	(Gls)
1984–1985	ASK Voitsberg		
1985–1986	Grazer AK		
1986–1987	Donawitzer SV Leoben		
1992–1993	Grazer AK		
1993–1994	Red-White Rankweil		
1996–1997	SV Frohnleiten		

Managerial career
- 2005: AKA Vorarlberg
- 2005–2007: Austria Lustenau
- 2008–2012: Liechtenstein U-21
- 2012–2018: Liechtenstein
- 2023: Liechtenstein (Interim)
- * Club domestic league appearances and goals

Rene Pauritsch (born 4 December 1964) is an Austrian football manager and former player who played as a forward.

== Managerial career ==
Pauritsch was appointed manager of the Liechtenstein national team in 2012, succeeding Hans-Peter Zaugg.

At the end of 2018, Pauritsch left his role as manager to become the sporting director for Liechtenstein's national team. Previously, this role was part of the manager job, but this was split as part of the LFV's 2021 strategy

In March 2023, after Martin Stocklasa left the Liechtenstein national team to become manager of FC Vaduz, it was announced that Pauritsch would manage the team for their UEFA Euro 2024 qualifying matches against Portugal and Iceland.

== Managerial statistics ==
As of 26 March 2023

Team	Nat	From	To	Record				
Team	Nat	From	To	G	W	D	L	Win %
Austria Lustenau	(Austria)	July 2005	June 2007	74	33	23	18	44.59
Liechtenstein	(Liechtenstein)	October 2012	November 2018	49	4	7	38	8.16
Liechtenstein	(Liechtenstein)	March 2023	May 2023	2	0	0	2	0.00
Total				125	37	30	58	29.60
