= Ferhat Sağlam =

Liechtensteiner footballer (born 2001)

Personal information
- Date of birth: 10 October 2001 (age 25)
- Place of birth: Vaduz, Liechtenstein
- Height: 1.81 m (5 ft 11 in)
- Positions: Forward; winger

Team information
- Current team: Ruggell
- Number: 58

Youth career
- 2007–2018: Vaduz

Senior career*
Years	Team	Apps	(Gls)
2018–2022	Vaduz	6	(1)
2019	→ Balzers (loan)	14	(2)
2022	Kriens	0	(0)
2022–2023	Eschen/Mauren	15	(0)
2023–2024	Vaduz	0	(0)
2024–2025	Brühl	12	(0)
2025	Balzers	13	(6)
2025–2026	Eintracht Hohkeppel	20	(8)
2025	→ Eintracht Hohkeppel II (loan)	2	(0)
2026–	Ruggell	4	(2)

International career^{‡}
2017	Liechtenstein U17	3	(1)
2017–2018	Liechtenstein U19	6	(1)
2023–	Liechtenstein	29	(2)
- * Club domestic league appearances and goals as of 20:57, 20 September (UTC) ‡ National team caps and goals as of 16:53, 15 November 2026 (UTC)

Ferhat Sağlam (born 10 October 2001) is a Liechtensteiner footballer who plays as a winger for FC Ruggell, and the Liechtenstein national team.

== Club career ==
Sağlam was a youth player for Vaduz before graduating to their senior team in 2018 where he made a handful of Challenge League appearances between 2018 and 2022. He also spent time on loan at Balzers and was signed at Kriens for a brief period before moving to Eschen/Mauren on a free transfer in August 2022.

Sağlam then moved back to Vaduz in the summer of 2023.

On 3 July 2024, Sağlam signed with Swiss Promotion League club Brühl.

He then moved back to Balzers in February 2025.

Sağlam joined German fifth-tier outfit SV Eintracht Hohkeppel in the 2025 summer transfer window.

== International career ==
Born in Liechtenstein, Sağlam is of Kurdish-Turkish descent. He made his international debut for Liechtenstein on 17 June 2023 in a UEFA Euro 2024 qualifying match against Luxembourg.

== Career statistics ==
=== International ===
As of 13 November 2026

Liechtenstein
Year	Apps	Goals
2023	4	0
2024	10	1
2025	9	0
2026	6	1
Total	29	2

==== International goals ====
No.	Date	Venue	Opponent	Score	Result	Competition
1.	8 September 2024	Europa Point Stadium, Gibraltar	Gibraltar	1–1	2–2	2024–25 UEFA Nations League D
2.	26 March 2026	Kigali Pelé Stadium, Kigali, Rwanda	Tanzania	1–0	1–0	2026 FIFA Series
