= Felix Oberwaditzer =

Liechtensteiner footballer (born 2006)

Personal information
- Date of birth: 14 March 2006 (age 20)
- Place of birth: Hörbranz, Austria
- Height: 1.87 m (6 ft 2 in)
- Position: Centre-back

Team information
- Current team: Grand Canyon Antelopes
- Number: 4

Youth career
- 2013–2020: FC Hörbranz
- 2020–2024: AKA Vorarlberg

College career
Years	Team	Apps	(Gls)
2026–	Grand Canyon Antelopes		

Senior career*
Years	Team	Apps	(Gls)
2024–2025	Rheindorf Altach II	18	(0)
2024–2025	Rheindorf Altach	0	(0)
2025–2026	Austria Lustenau	0	(0)
2025–2026	Austria Lustenau II	11	(1)

International career^{‡}
2022	Liechtenstein U17	4	(1)
2023–2024	Liechtenstein U19	7	(0)
2024–	Liechtenstein	7	(0)
- * Club domestic league appearances and goals as of 6 June 2026 ‡ National team caps and goals as of 09:15, 5 June 2026 (UTC)

Felix Oberwaditzer (born 14 March 2006) is a professional footballer who plays as a centre-back for American university team Grand Canyon Antelopes. Born in Austria, he plays for the Liechtenstein national team.

== Club career ==
Oberwaditzer began his career with FC Hörbranz before moving to AKA Vorarlberg. In the summer of 2024, he signed a three-year contract with Rheindorf Altach in Austria.

== International career ==
Oberwaditzer made his debut for the Liechtenstein national team on 3 June 2024 in a friendly against Albania.

=== International statistics ===
As of match played 4 June 2026

Liechtenstein
Year	Apps	Goals
2024	3	0
2025	2	0
2026	2	0
Total	7	0
