= Emanuel Zünd =

Liechtenstein footballer (born 2004)

Personal information
- Full name: Emanuel Stefan Zünd
- Date of birth: 29 December 2004 (age 21)
- Place of birth: Vaduz, Liechtenstein
- Position: Left winger

Team information
- Current team: SV Muttenz
- Number: 17

Youth career
- –2019: Ruggell
- 2019–2023: Vaduz

Senior career*
Years	Team	Apps	(Gls)
2022–2023	Vaduz II	0	(0)
2023–2024	Signal FC	6	(0)
2024–2025	Veyrier Sports	13	(3)
2024–2026	Meyrin	34	(2)
2026–	Muttenz	6	(0)

International career^{‡}
2017–2018	Liechtenstein U15	5	(0)
2019	Liechtenstein U17	8	(0)
2022–	Liechtenstein U21	2	(0)
2024–	Liechtenstein	22	(1)
Medal record
Representing Liechtenstein
Men's football
FIFA Series
Runner-up	2026 Rwanda
- * Club domestic league appearances and goals as of 20 September 2026 ‡ National team caps and goals as of 16 November 2026

Emanuel Stefan Zünd (born 29 December 2004) is a Liechtenstein football player who plays as a left winger for Swiss 1. Liga Classic club SV Muttenz and the Liechtenstein national team.

== Club career ==
He came up through the youth ranks at Ruggell and then Vaduz. On August 3, 2023, he transferred to Signal, where he made his first-team debut on August 26. After making six appearances during the winter transfer window, he moved to Veyrier, where he scored three goals in 13 appearances. The following season, he played for Meyrin in the 1. Liga Classic, before moving on to SV Muttenz in 2026.

== International career ==
Zünd made his debut for the Liechtenstein national team on 5 September 2024 in a Nations League game against San Marino at the San Marino Stadium. He started and played 63 minutes, as San Marino won 1–0. That was first ever competitive victory in San Marino's national team history.

=== International goals ===
No.	Date	Venue	Opponent	Score	Result	Competition
1.	29 March 2026	Kigali Pelé Stadium, Kigali, Rwanda	Aruba	1–2	1–4	2026 FIFA Series

== Honours ==
Liechtenstein

- FIFA Series runner-up: 2026
