= Kenny Kindle =

Liechtenstein footballer (born 2003)

Personal information
- Date of birth: 29 November 2003 (age 22)
- Position: Winger

Team information
- Current team: FC Balzers
- Number: 17

Youth career
- FC Triesen

Senior career*
Years	Team	Apps	(Gls)
–2023	FC Triesen		
2024–2025	FC Vaduz II		
2025–	FC Balzers	18	(2)

International career^{‡}
2017–2018	Liechtenstein U15	5	(1)
2018–2019	Liechtenstein U17	6	(0)
2023–	Liechtenstein	23	(0)
- * Club domestic league appearances and goals as of 6 June 2026 ‡ National team caps and goals as of 5 October 2026

Kenny Kindle (born 28 March 2003) is a Liechtenstein professional footballer who plays as a winger for FC Balzers.

== Early life ==
Kindle was born on 28 March 2003. Of Vietnamese descent through his mother, he is a native of Triesen, Liechtenstein.

== Club career ==
As a youth player, Kindle joined the youth academy of FC Triesen and was promoted to the club's senior team. Following his stint there, he signed for FC Vaduz II. Ahead of the 2025–26 season, he signed for FC Balzers.

== International career ==
Kindle is a Liechtenstein international. During March, June, October, and November 2025, he played for the Liechtenstein national football team for 2026 FIFA World Cup qualification.

== Style of play ==
Kindle plays as a winger. Vietnamese news website Bongdaplus.vn wrote in 2026 that he "is known for his impressive speed and quick finishing, particularly effective in counter-attacks or wing attacks. He is frequently used as a left midfielder, where he can exploit the space behind opposing defenders. His acceleration and quick changes of direction allow him to create dangerous situations and draw attention from both teammates and opponents".
