= Konrad Fünfstück =

German football manager (born 1980)

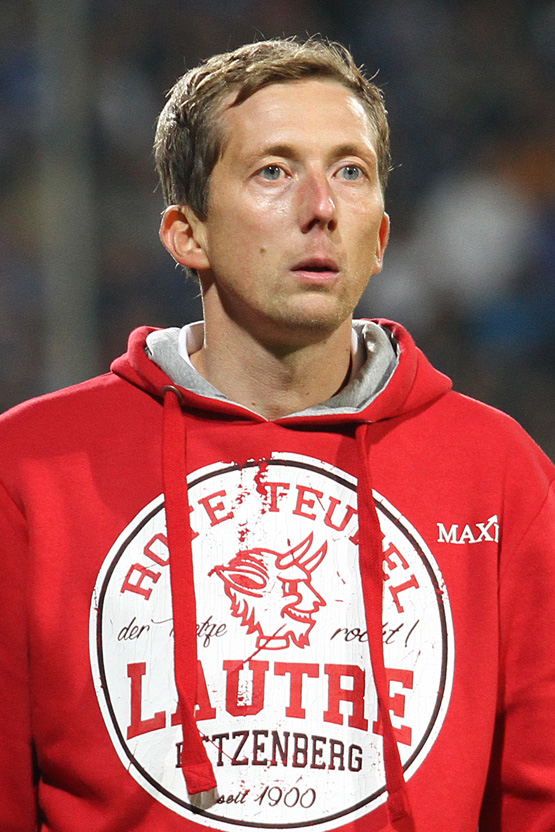
- Fünfstück with 1. FC Kaiserslautern in 2015

Personal information
- Date of birth: 7 October 1980 (age 46)
- Place of birth: Bayreuth, Germany

Team information
- Current team: Liechtenstein (manager)

Managerial career
- Years: Team
- 2011–2012: Greuther Fürth II
- 2013–2015: 1. FC Kaiserslautern II
- 2015–2016: 1. FC Kaiserslautern
- 2017–2019: FC Wil
- 2019–2023: Werder Bremen II
- 2023–: Liechtenstein

Konrad Fünfstück (born 7 October 1980) is a German football manager who manages the Liechtenstein national team.

His first major role was as manager of 1. FC Kaiserslautern. Fünfstück held this role from September 2015 until he was released in May 2016. He has also managed Swiss Super League side FC Wil.

== Managerial career ==
=== Early career ===
Having ended his playing career due to injury, Fünfstück worked as the youth team manager of VfB Pößneck. In July 2002, he left Pößneck to join Greuther Fürth as the youth team manager. He stayed as the manager until 2006, when he became Fürth's youth director. He took charge of the youth team once more in 2010 and remained in this post until June 2011, when he once again moved upwards to become the new manager of Greuther Fürth II.

He remained in this post until the end of 2012. During his time with Fürth II, they played in the Regionalliga Bayern.

=== 1. FC Kaiserslautern ===
Fünfstück left Greuther Fürth to join 1.FC Kaiserslautern, where he would become their reserve team manager and head of youth development. When Kosta Runjaic left the club in September 2015, Fünfstück was announced as the new first team manager. His first game in charge was a 2–1 away win over VfL Bochum. By the end of the 2015–16 season Fünfstück was released from his contract.

=== FC Wil ===
In June 2017 he was named as the new manager of Swiss Super League club FC Wil.

=== Werder Bremen ===
In May 2019, it was announced Fünfstück would manage Werder Bremen II for the 2019–20 season.

=== Liechtenstein ===
On 23 May 2023, Fünfstück was announced as the new Liechtenstein national team manager from 1 June.

== Managerial statistics ==
As of match played 16 November 2026

Team	From	To	Record				
Team	From	To	G	W	D	L	Win %
Liechtenstein	May 2023	Present	38	2	5	31	5.26
Total			38	2	5	31	5.26
