= Erich Bürzle =

Liechtensteiner footballer and coach

Personal information
- Date of birth: 9 February 1953 (age 73)
- Place of birth: Liechtenstein
- Position: Midfielder

Senior career*
Years	Team	Apps	(Gls)
- FC Balzers

International career
- Liechtenstein

Managerial career
- 1990: Liechtenstein
- 1997: Liechtenstein
- * Club domestic league appearances and goals

Erich Bürzle (born 9 February 1953 in Liechtenstein) is a Liechtensteiner former footballer and coach who managed the Liechtenstein national football team in 1990 and 1997.
