= Hans-Peter Zaugg =

Swiss footballer and manager (born 1952)

Personal information
- Date of birth: 2 December 1952 (age 73)
- Place of birth: Bern, Switzerland
- Position: Midfielder

Senior career*
Years	Team	Apps	(Gls)
1963–1973	FC Rot-Weiss Bümpliz		
1973–1978	Neuchâtel Xamax		
1978–1980	FC Bern		

Managerial career
- 1980–1983: Zollikofen FC
- 1983–1985: FC Aarberg
- 1985–1988: FC Rapid Ostermundigen
- 1988–1990: SC Bümpliz 78
- 1999–2000: Switzerland (caretaker)
- 2000–2001: Grasshoppers
- 2002–2003: FC Luzern
- 2003–2005: Young Boys
- 2006–2012: Liechtenstein
- 2015–2017: FC Solothurn
- * Club domestic league appearances and goals

Hans-Peter Zaugg, (born 2 December 1952), is a Swiss football manager and former player. He is often referred to by his nickname, "Bidu."

== Career ==
A midfielder, Zaugg played for FC Rot-Weiss Bümpliz, Neuchâtel Xamax and FC Bern. After taking up coaching he coached at various Swiss clubs until 1990, when he became a youth coach in the Swiss Football Association. Two years later, Zaugg also joined the Switzerland senior team as an assistant coach, a position he held until 1999, when he became caretaker of the national side, following Gilbert Gress' resignation in a dispute over salary. From 2000 to 2005, Zaugg then coached at Grasshopper Club Zurich, FC Luzern and BSC Young Boys.

In December 2006, Zaugg was named manager of the Liechtenstein national team succeeding Martin Andermatt. Zaugg and the LFV cancelled the contract in a mutual agreement by 31 December 2012.
