= VfB Hohenems =

Austrian sports club

- Full name: Verein für Bewegungsspiele Hohenems
- Founded: 1923; 103 years ago
- Ground: Herrenried Stadion
- Manager: Werner Grabherr
- League: Regionalliga West (III)
- 2025–26: Regionalliga West, 8th of 17
- Website: Website

VfB Hohenems is an Austrian association football club based in Hohenems, Vorarlberg. The team currently plays in the Regionalliga West, the third tier of the Austrian football league system.
