= Liechtenstein national football team =

Liechtenstein
- Nickname(s): Blau-Rot (The Blue-Reds)
- Association: Liechtensteiner Fussballverband (LFV)
- Confederation: UEFA (Europe)
- Head coach: Konrad Fünfstück
- Captain: Nicolas Hasler
- Most caps: Peter Jehle (132)
- Top scorer: Mario Frick (16)
- Home stadium: Rheinpark Stadion
- FIFA code: LIE
| First colours | Second colours |

FIFA ranking
- Current: 207 (18 November 2026)
- Highest: 118 (January 2008, July 2011, September 2011)
- Lowest: 206 (October 2025, April 2026 – June 2026)

First international
- Liechtenstein 1–1 Malta (Daejeon, South Korea; 14 June 1981)

Biggest win
- Luxembourg 0–4 Liechtenstein (Luxembourg, Luxembourg; 13 October 2004)

Biggest defeat
- Liechtenstein 1–11 FYR Macedonia (Eschen, Liechtenstein; 9 November 1996)
- Website: lfv.li

The Liechtenstein national football team (German: Liechtensteinische Fussballnationalmannschaft) is the national football team of the Principality of Liechtenstein and is controlled by the Liechtenstein Football Association. The organisation is known as the Liechtensteiner Fussballverband in German.

The team's first match was an unofficial match against Malta in Seoul, a 1–1 draw in 1981. Their first official match came two years later, a 0–1 defeat by Switzerland. Liechtenstein's largest win, a 4–0 win over Luxembourg in a 2006 FIFA World Cup qualifier on 13 October 2004, was both its first away win and its first win in any FIFA World Cup qualifier.

Liechtenstein has never qualified for the FIFA World Cup and UEFA European Championship.

Liechtenstein is the only country that has lost official matches against San Marino – once in a 2004 friendly, and twice in the 2024–25 UEFA Nations League. Liechtenstein suffered its biggest ever loss in 1996, during 1998 FIFA World Cup qualifiers, losing 1–11 to Macedonia (now North Macedonia), the result also being Macedonia's largest ever win to date. The team's head coach is currently Konrad Fünfstück.

== History ==
Liechtenstein are only a relatively recent affiliate to FIFA, and did not participate in any qualifying series until the UEFA Euro 1996 qualifiers. There they surprised the Republic of Ireland by holding them to a 0–0 draw on 3 June 1995. On 14 October 1998, they achieved their first victory in a qualifying campaign, by 2–1 against Azerbaijan in a UEFA Euro 2000 qualifying match.

Since then, the presence of Liechtenstein clubs in the Swiss league system and of a handful of professional players (most notably Mario Frick) has seen the side's competitiveness improve slightly. The Euro 2004 qualifiers saw Liechtenstein improve to the extent they restricted England to 2–0 wins. Also at this time Liechtenstein lost 1–0 against San Marino, considered to be the weakest national team. The 2006 FIFA World Cup qualifiers brought even better results as two wins over Luxembourg and draws against both Slovakia and Portugal meant that Liechtenstein finished with 8 points.

In the UEFA Euro 2008 qualifiers, Liechtenstein beat Latvia with a solitary goal from Mario Frick. The result caused the Latvian manager to resign after the match. They repeated their success against Iceland, beating them 3–0 on 17 October 2007 for their second qualifying group win. On 26 March 2008 Liechtenstein had an embarrassing 7–1 loss to another small nation in Europe, Malta. This was recorded as Malta's largest win.

The Liechtensteiner Fussballverbund voted Rainer Hasler to be their "Golden Player" — their best player over the last 50 years — to mark UEFA's golden jubilee.

=== From 2010 World Cup qualifiers ===
In the 2010 FIFA World Cup qualifiers, Liechtenstein secured a scoreless draw against Azerbaijan and a 1–1 draw against Finland, finishing bottom of Group 4 on two points.

In the UEFA Euro 2012 qualifiers, Liechtenstein were narrowly beaten 2–1 by Scotland in Hampden Park thanks to a goal by Stephen McManus in the seventh minute of additional time. They produced a shock 2–0 win at home against Lithuania; their goals were scored by Philippe Erne and Michele Polverino. In the following qualifying game, they managed a scoreless draw away to Lithuania.

In the qualifiers for the 2014 FIFA World Cup, the Blue-Reds were humiliated at home in their opening game against Bosnia-Herzegovina (1–8). The team lost many of its qualifying matches and earned its only two points in draws against Latvia and Slovakia. The team finished bottom of its group.

In the UEFA Euro 2016 qualifying campaign in France, Liechtenstein finished second-bottom of the group and took five points, with a goalless draw at home against Montenegro, an away win against Moldova, one goal to nil, thanks to Franz Burgmeier's ninth goal, and then a 1–1 home draw in the return against the same Moldovans, the group's red lanterns with three fewer units.

In the 2018 FIFA World Cup qualifiers, The Blue-Reds lost all 10 of their matches and finished bottom of their group with no points scored and just one goal scored (away against Israel) compared to 39 conceded.

In 2018, Liechtenstein entered the first UEFA Nations League, in group 4 of league D. Their first Nations League match saw Armenia beat them 2–1 away. Liechtenstein were able to claim their first Nations League victory, beating Gibraltar 2–0 at home. Liechtenstein finished bottom of their group with just one win and a draw, also at home, against Armenia (2–2).

=== From Euro 2020 qualifiers ===
During the UEFA Euro 2020 qualifiers, Liechtenstein managed to pick up two points thanks to two draws, one away to Greece (1–1) and the other at home to Armenia (1–1), but finished bottom of their group with 2 goals scored and 31 conceded.

In the 2020–21 edition of the Nations League, Liechtenstein failed to gain promotion to League C, with a single win (2–0 at San Marino), two draws (0–0 at home to San Marino and 1–1 at Gibraltar) and one defeat (0–1 at home to Gibraltar, their direct rival who eventually gained promotion). The Blue-Reds disappointed by failing to win a single match at home, once again falling behind Gibraltar in the standings as they had done in the previous edition, and being dominated overall in the goalless draw with San Marino.

The 2022 FIFA World Cup qualifiers once again saw Liechtenstein finish bottom of their group, with just one point from a 1–1 draw away to Armenia, and 9 defeats, with 2 goals scored and 34 conceded.

The 2022–23 edition of the UEFA Nations League was also a disappointment for Liechtenstein, who finished bottom of their group with 6 defeats in as many games played and just one goal scored, away against Andorra (1–2), their worst record in this competition in 3 editions.

Liechtenstein began 2024 with four friendly matches, losing two and drawing two. One of the draws came away from home against Romania a few days prior to UEFA Euro 2024, a tournament which Romania had qualified for undefeated.

Liechtenstein began their 2024–25 UEFA Nations League campaign with a 0–1 loss away to San Marino after a Liechtenstein goal was denied through offside, handing the Sammarinese their first competitive victory. Following this, Liechtenstein proceeded to draw Gibraltar twice (2–2 away and 0–0 at home with a decisive penalty missed in the stoppage time during the return match against Gibraltar) before losing to San Marino again, this time 1–3 in Vaduz, finishing bottom of Group D1 on 2 points. Between the two draws with Gibraltar, Liechtenstein ended a 41-game winless streak with a 1–0 victory over Hong Kong.

Liechtenstein then went on a 12-match losing streak spanning from the end of 2025 throughout 2025. On 26 March 2026, at the 2026 FIFA Series, Liechtenstein ended the streak with a 1–0 upset victory against Tanzania, who were ranked 110th in the FIFA Rankings, 95 places higher than Liechtenstein.

Liechtenstein lost their opening match of the 2026–27 UEFA Nations League to Lithuania 2–0. They then drew 0–0 with Azerbaijan in Baku, their first competitive point in just under two years.

== Team image ==
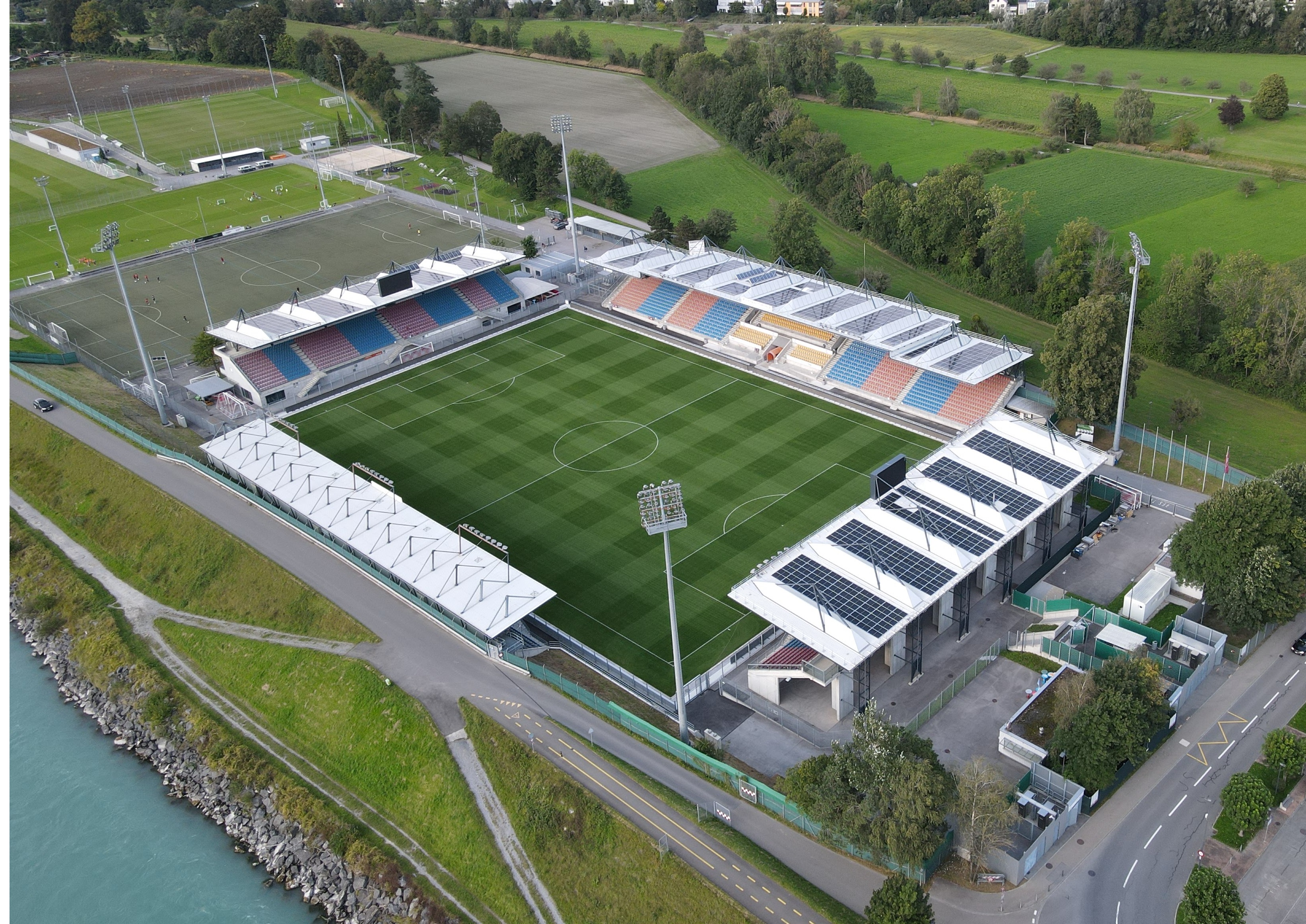
The Rheinpark Stadion is Liechtenstein's home ground.

=== Kit suppliers ===
| Kit supplier | Period |
|---|---|
| (Germany) Adidas | 1989–1990 |
| (France) Le Coq Sportif | 1994 |
| (Germany) Adidas | 2000–2017 |
| (Italy) Macron | 2018–2021 |
| (Italy) Erreà | 2022–2025 |
| (Germany) Adidas | 2026–present |

=== Stadium ===
Liechtenstein play their home games at the Rheinpark Stadion in Vaduz.

== Results and fixtures ==
The following is a list of match results in the last 12 months, as well as any future matches that have been scheduled.

Win Draw Loss Fixture

=== 2026 ===
| 26 March 2026 2026 FIFA Series | Tanzania | 0–1 | Liechtenstein | Kigali, Rwanda |
| 16:30 UTC+2 | | Report | Sağlam 55' | Stadium: Kigali Pelé Stadium; Attendance: 4,500; Referee: Mohamed Diraneh (Djibouti) |

| 29 March 2026 2026 FIFA Series | Aruba | 4–1 | Liechtenstein | Kigali, Rwanda |
| 18:00 UTC+2 | Romano 18'; Robertha 25'; Ostiana (yellow card) 48' (yellow-red card) 61'; Breinburg 69'; Hofer 90+4' (o.g.) | Report | Zünd 52' | Stadium: Kigali Pelé Stadium; Referee: Samuel Uwikunda (Rwanda) |

| 4 June 2026 Friendly | Andorra | 2–0 | Liechtenstein | Encamp, Andorra |
| 19:00 UTC+2 | Martínez 74'; Aláez 81' (pen.) | Report | | Stadium: Estadi de la FAF; Attendance: 1,000; Referee: Javier Alberola (Spain) |

| 7 June 2026 Friendly | Liechtenstein | 0–2 | Cyprus | Vaduz, Liechtenstein |
| 15:00 (UTC+2) | | Report | Tzionis 28'; Sotiriou 70' | Stadium: Rheinpark Stadion; Attendance: 878; Referee: Anojen Kanagasingam (Switzerland) |

| 24 September 2026 2026–27 UEFA Nations League | Liechtenstein | 0–2 | Lithuania | Vaduz, Liechtenstein |
| 20:45 UTC+2 | | Report | Michelbrink 53'; Dolžnikov 66' | Stadium: Rheinpark Stadion; Attendance: 1,055; Referee: Ante Čulina (Croatia) |

| 27 September 2026 Friendly | Malta | 2–0 | Liechtenstein | Ta' Qali, Malta |
| 18:30 UTC+2 | Grech 37'; Zammit 63' | Report | | Stadium: National Stadium; Attendance: 1,953; Referee: Daniyar Sakhi (Kazakhstan) |

| 1 October 2026 2026–27 UEFA Nations League | Azerbaijan | 0–0 | Liechtenstein | Baku, Azerbaijan |
| 20:00 UTC+4 | | Report | | Stadium: Tofiq Bahramov Republican Stadium; Attendance: 4,200; Referee: Christian-Petru Ciochirca (Austria) |

| 5 October 2026 Friendly | Liechtenstein | 0–2 | Gibraltar | Vaduz, Liechtenstein |
| 20:45 UTC+2 | | Report | Lopes 20'; Borge 57' | Stadium: Rheinpark Stadion; Attendance: 972; Referee: Luca Cibelli (Switzerland) |

| 13 November 2026 2026–27 UEFA Nations League | Liechtenstein | 0–1 | Azerbaijan | Vaduz, Liechtenstein |
| 20:45 UTC+1 | | Report | Emreli 14' | Stadium: Rheinpark Stadion; Attendance: 1,071; Referee: Kristo Tohver (Estonia) |

| 16 November 2026 2026–27 UEFA Nations League | Lithuania | 2−1 | Liechtenstein | Kaunas, Lithuania |
| 19:00 UTC+2 | Jankauskas 16'; Ruzgis 50' (pen.) | Report | Sele 60' | Stadium: Darius and Girėnas Stadium; Attendance: 2,276; Referee: Allard Lindhout (Netherlands) |

== Manager history ==
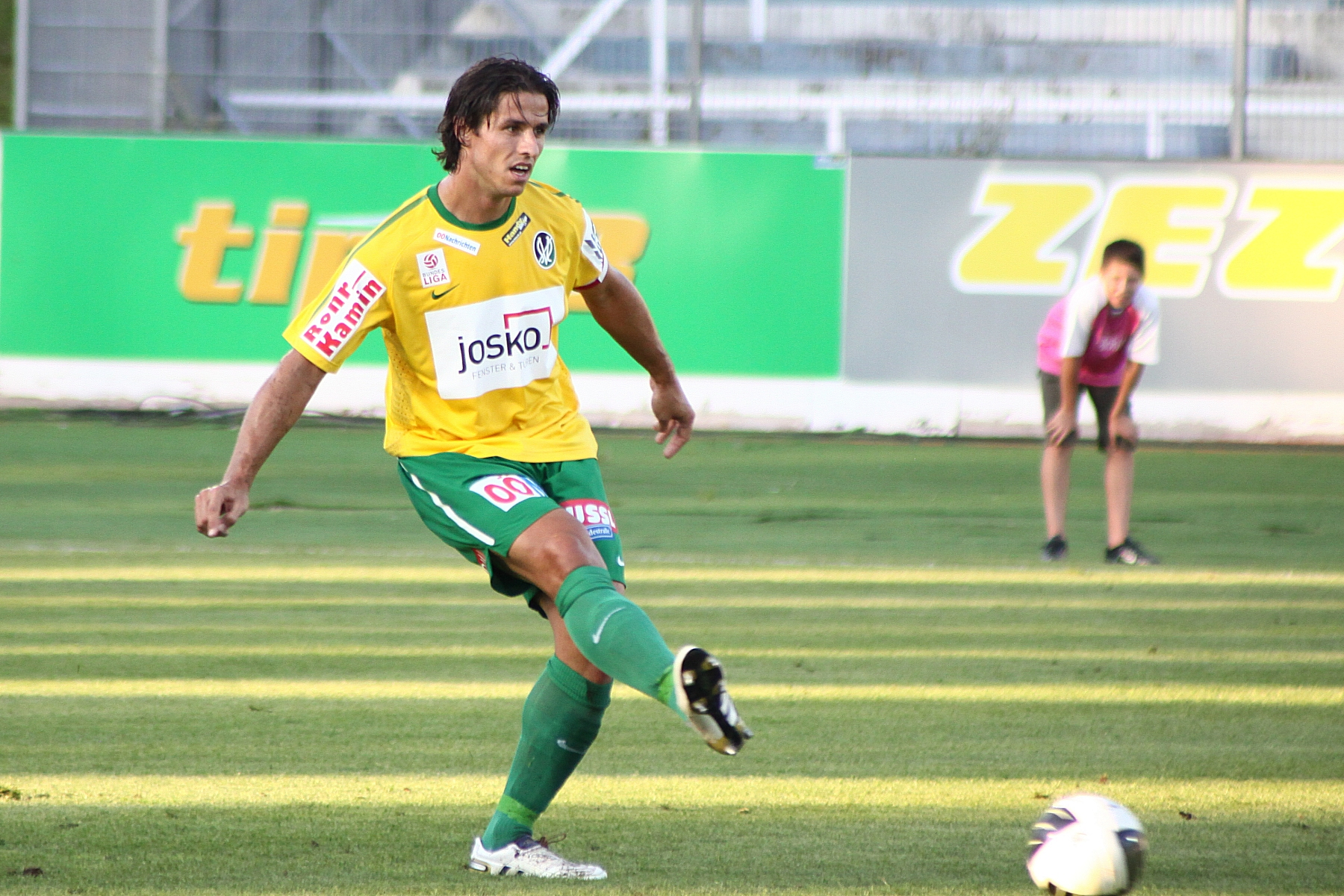
Martin Stocklasa, the team manager from 2020 to 2023.

- (Liechtenstein) Erich Bürzle (1990)
- (Germany) Dietrich Weise (1990–1996)
- (Austria) Alfred Riedl (1997–1998)
- (Liechtenstein) Erich Bürzle (1998)
- (Germany) Ralf Loose (1998–2003)
- (Austria) Walter Hörmann (2003–2004)
- (Switzerland) Martin Andermatt (2004–2006)
- (Switzerland) Urs Meier (2006)
- (Switzerland) Hans-Peter Zaugg (2006–2012)
- (Austria) Rene Pauritsch (2013–2018)
- (Iceland) Helgi Kolviðsson (2018–2020)
- (Liechtenstein) Martin Stocklasa (2020–2023)
- (Austria) Rene Pauritsch (2023)
- (Germany) Konrad Fünfstück (2023–)

== Players ==
=== Current squad ===
The following players were called up for the 2026–27 UEFA Nations League matches against Azerbaijan and Lithuania on 13 and 16 November 2026.

Caps and goals are current as of 16 November 2026 after the match against Lithuania.

| No. | Pos. | Player | Date of birth (age) | Caps | Goals | Club |
|---|---|---|---|---|---|---|
| 1 | GK | Benjamin Büchel (vice-captain) | 4 July 1989 (age 37) | 87 | 0 | (Liechtenstein Football Association) Vaduz |
| 12 | GK | Justin Ospelt | 7 September 1999 (age 27) | 12 | 0 | Unattached |
| 21 | GK | Gabriel Foser | 2 September 2002 (age 24) | 0 | 0 | (Liechtenstein Football Association) Eschen/Mauren |
| | GK | Tim-Tiado Oehri | 15 December 2003 (age 22) | 0 | 0 | (Liechtenstein Football Association) Vaduz |
| 2 | DF | Niklas Beck | 25 March 2001 (age 25) | 30 | 0 | (Liechtenstein Football Association) Balzers |
| 3 | DF | Maximilian Göppel | 31 August 1997 (age 29) | 88 | 2 | (Swiss Football Association) Freienbach |
| 5 | DF | Severin Schlegel | 24 July 2004 (age 22) | 19 | 0 | (Liechtenstein Football Association) Balzers |
| 6 | DF | Andreas Malin | 31 January 1994 (age 32) | 60 | 0 | (Austrian Football Association) Göfis |
| 14 | DF | Livio Meier | 10 January 1998 (age 28) | 65 | 1 | (Liechtenstein Football Association) Eschen/Mauren |
| 23 | DF | Jens Hofer | 1 October 1997 (age 29) | 51 | 0 | (Swiss Football Association) Düdingen |
| | DF | Yonas Abidi | 18 December 2006 (age 19) | 0 | 0 | (Liechtenstein Football Association) Vaduz II |
| 8 | MF | Aron Sele | 2 September 1996 (age 30) | 82 | 3 | (Swiss Football Association) YF Juventus |
| 10 | MF | Marcel Büchel | 18 March 1991 (age 35) | 36 | 1 | Unattached |
| 13 | MF | Luca Beck | 12 July 2003 (age 23) | 1 | 0 | (Portuguese Football Federation) Castrense |
| 15 | MF | Andrin Netzer | 11 January 2002 (age 24) | 28 | 0 | (Austrian Football Association) Dornbirn |
| 17 | MF | Liam Kranz | 17 July 2003 (age 23) | 16 | 0 | (Liechtenstein Football Association) Eschen/Mauren |
| 18 | MF | Manuel Mikus | 13 July 1999 (age 27) | 1 | 0 | (Royal Dutch Football Association) AVV Swift |
| 19 | MF | Emanuel Zünd | 29 December 2004 (age 21) | 22 | 1 | (Swiss Football Association) Muttenz |
| 20 | MF | Alessio Hasler | 7 July 2005 (age 21) | 18 | 0 | (German Football Association) FV Illertissen |
| 22 | MF | Florian Allgäuer | 9 December 2006 (age 19) | 4 | 0 | (Liechtenstein Football Association) Ruggell |
| | MF | Fabio Wolfinger | 5 November 1996 (age 30) | 37 | 1 | (Liechtenstein Football Association) Balzers |
| | MF | Simon Lüchinger | 28 November 2002 (age 23) | 36 | 0 | (Football Association of Ireland) Kerry |
| | MF | Samuel Cernadas | 23 December 2003 (age 22) | 0 | 0 | (Liechtenstein Football Association) Balzers |
| 4 | FW | Philipp Ospelt | 7 October 1992 (age 34) | 23 | 0 | (Liechtenstein Football Association) Ruggell |
| 7 | FW | Fabio Luque-Notaro | 31 August 2005 (age 21) | 31 | 0 | (Liechtenstein Football Association) Balzers |
| 9 | FW | Ferhat Sağlam | 10 October 2001 (age 25) | 29 | 2 | (Liechtenstein Football Association) Ruggell |
| 11 | FW | Alessandro Lo Russo | 23 September 2008 (age 18) | 6 | 0 | (Liechtenstein Football Association) Eschen/Mauren |
| 16 | FW | Bruno Poitner | 22 March 2007 (age 19) | 7 | 0 | (German Football Association) SV Fellbach |
| | FW | Dennis Salanović | 26 February 1996 (age 30) | 67 | 4 | (Swiss Football Association) Linth 04 |
| | FW | Willy Pizzi | 28 December 1994 (age 31) | 11 | 0 | (Liechtenstein Football Association) Balzers |

=== Recent call-ups ===
The following players were called up in the last 12 months and are still eligible to represent.

| Pos. | Player | Date of birth (age) | Caps | Goals | Club | Latest call-up |
|---|---|---|---|---|---|---|
| GK | Lorenzo Lo Russo | 8 July 1993 (age 33) | 0 | 0 | (Liechtenstein) Balzers | v. Gibraltar, 5 October 2026 |
| GK | Claudio Majer | 23 March 1996 (age 30) | 0 | 0 | (Liechtenstein) Ruggell | v. Gibraltar, 5 October 2026 |
| GK | Silvan Schädler | 6 February 2006 (age 20) | 0 | 0 | (Liechtenstein) Vaduz II | v. Cyprus, 7 June 2026 |
| DF | Jonas Weissenhofer | 25 July 2006 (age 20) | 11 | 0 | (Austria) VfB Hohenems | v. Gibraltar, 5 October 2026 |
| DF | Felix Oberwaditzer | 14 March 2006 (age 20) | 7 | 0 | (United States) Grand Canyon Antelopes | v. Gibraltar, 5 October 2026 |
| DF | Manoel Honorio | 23 September 2009 (age 17) | 0 | 0 | (Liechtenstein) Eschen/Mauren | v. Gibraltar, 5 October 2026 |
| MF | Nicolas Hasler (captain) | 4 May 1991 (age 35) | 114 | 7 | (Liechtenstein) Vaduz | v. Azerbaijan, 13 November 2026 ^{INJ} |
| MF | Lars Traber | 12 June 2000 (age 26) | 31 | 0 | (Switzerland) Brühl | v. Gibraltar, 5 October 2026 |
| MF | Kenny Kindle | 29 November 2003 (age 22) | 23 | 0 | (Liechtenstein) Balzers | v. Gibraltar, 5 October 2026 |
| MF | Julian Keller | 23 July 2006 (age 20) | 0 | 0 | (Switzerland) Dardania St. Gallen | v. Gibraltar, 5 October 2026 |
| FW | Philipp Gaßner | 30 August 2003 (age 23) | 7 | 0 | (Austria) Dornbirner SV | v. Cyprus, 7 June 2026 |
| FW | Julien Hasler | 22 September 1989 (age 37) | 7 | 0 | (Liechtenstein) Schaan | v. Cyprus, 7 June 2026 |
| FW | Agim Zeciri | 16 March 1984 (age 42) | 0 | 0 | (Liechtenstein) Ruggell | v. Aruba, 29 March 2026 |
Notes: ^{INJ} = Injured; ^{WD} = Player withdrew from the squad due to non-injury issue; ^{RET} = Retired from the national team

== Player records ==
As of 16 November 2026
Players in bold are still active with Liechtenstein.

=== Most appearances ===
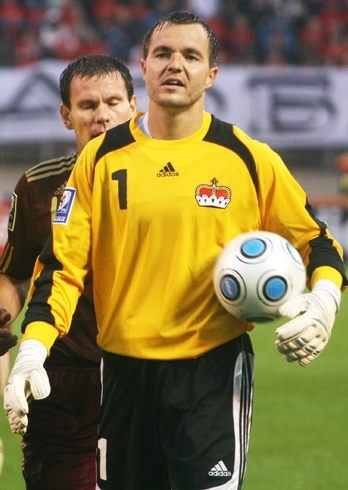
Peter Jehle is Liechtenstein's most capped player at 132 caps.

| Rank | Player | Caps | Goals | Career |
|---|---|---|---|---|
| 1 | Peter Jehle | 132 | 0 | 1998–2018 |
| 2 | Mario Frick | 125 | 16 | 1993–2015 |
| 3 | **Nicolas Hasler** | 114 | 7 | 2010–present |
| 4 | Martin Stocklasa | 113 | 5 | 1996–2014 |
| 5 | Franz Burgmeier | 112 | 9 | 2001–2018 |
| 6 | Thomas Beck | 92 | 5 | 1998–2013 |
| 7 | Martin Büchel | 91 | 2 | 2004–2021 |
| 8 | **Maximilian Göppel** | 88 | 2 | 2016–present |
| 9 | **Benjamin Büchel** | 87 | 0 | 2008–present |
| 10 | **Aron Sele** | 82 | 3 | 2016–present |

=== Top goalscorers ===
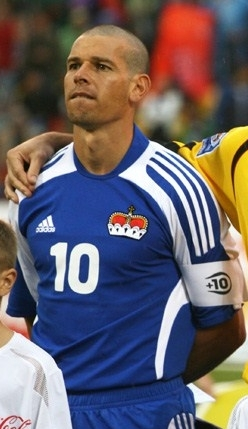
Mario Frick is Liechtenstein's all-time record goalscorer at 16 goals.

| Rank | Player | Goals | Caps | Ratio | Career |
|---|---|---|---|---|---|
| 1 | Mario Frick | 16 | 125 | 0.13 | 1993–2015 |
| 2 | Franz Burgmeier | 9 | 112 | 0.08 | 2001–2018 |
| 3 | **Nicolas Hasler** | 7 | 114 | 0.06 | 2010–present |
| 4 | Michele Polverino | 6 | 79 | 0.08 | 2007–2019 |
| 5 | Thomas Beck | 5 | 92 | 0.05 | 1998–2013 |
| 5 | Martin Stocklasa | 5 | 113 | 0.04 | 1996–2014 |
| 7 | **Dennis Salanović** | 4 | 67 | 0.06 | 2014–present |
| 8 | Yanik Frick | 3 | 30 | 0.1 | 2016–2022 |
| 8 | Sandro Wolfinger | 3 | 79 | 0.04 | 2013–2026 |
| 8 | **Aron Sele** | 3 | 82 | 0.04 | 2016–present |

== In literature ==
Prompted by the team's poor record in competitive games, British writer Charlie Connelly followed the entire qualifying campaign for the 2002 FIFA World Cup. As recorded in the subsequent book Stamping Grounds: Liechtenstein's Quest for the World Cup, Liechtenstein lost all eight games without scoring a goal.
