= Liechtenstein national under-19 football team =

- Association: Liechtenstein Football Association (Liechtensteiner Fussballverband)
- Confederation: UEFA (Europe)
- FIFA code: LIE
| First colours | Second colours |

First international
- Liechtenstein 1–2 Luxembourg (Vaduz, Liechtenstein; 23 February 1975)

Biggest win
- Andorra 1–3 Liechtenstein (Russia; 24 September 2003)

Biggest defeat
- Romania 11–0 Liechtenstein (Tunari, Romania; 28 March 2026)

UEFA U-19 European Championship
- Appearances: 1 (first in 2003)
- Best result: Group stage (2003)

The Liechtenstein national under-19 football team is the national under-19 football team of Liechtenstein and is controlled by the Liechtenstein Football Association. The team competes in the UEFA European Under-19 Football Championship, held every year.

== Players ==
=== Current Squad ===
The following players were called up for 2027 UEFA European Under-19 Championship qualification fixtures against Denmark, Romania, and Andorra between 25-31 March 2026.

| No. | Pos. | Player | Date of birth (age) | Club |
|---|---|---|---|---|
| | GK | Efe Gülbahar | 13 October 2008 (age 18) | (Liechtenstein Football Association) FC Vaduz |
| | GK | Lorenz Hassler | 14 October 2008 (age 18) | (Liechtenstein Football Association) FC Vaduz |
| | GK | Tobias Heitz | 10 August 2009 (age 17) | (Liechtenstein Football Association) FC Vaduz |
| | DF | Diego Nipp | 12 March 2009 (age 17) | (Liechtenstein Football Association) FC Vaduz |
| | DF | Lukas Schumacher | 1 June 2009 (age 17) | (Liechtenstein Football Association) FC Vaduz |
| | DF | Noah Gunsch | 11 January 2009 (age 17) | (Liechtenstein Football Association) FC Vaduz |
| | DF | Linus Gerner | 23 September 2008 (age 18) | (Liechtenstein Football Association) USV Eschen/Mauren |
| | DF | Manoel Honorio | 23 September 2009 (age 17) | (Liechtenstein Football Association) USV Eschen/Mauren |
| | DF | Leis Zekan | 15 December 2008 (age 17) | (Liechtenstein Football Association) FC Vaduz |
| | DF | Noe Kessler | 1 June 2009 (age 17) | (Swiss Football Association) FC Küsnacht |
| | DF | Johannes Wohlwend | 18 January 2009 (age 17) | (Liechtenstein Football Association) FC Vaduz |
| | MF | Valerian Scheidl | 23 September 2008 (age 18) | (Liechtenstein Football Association) FC Ruggell |
| | MF | Daniel Loacker | 8 June 2009 (age 17) | (Liechtenstein Football Association) FC Vaduz |
| | MF | Ethan Wohlwend | 15 December 2008 (age 17) | (Liechtenstein Football Association) FC Schaan |
| | MF | Emanuel Wolf | 17 July 2009 (age 17) | (Liechtenstein Football Association) FC Vaduz |
| | MF | Elmir Kryeziu | 7 May 2008 (age 18) | (Liechtenstein Football Association) FC Vaduz |
| | MF | Jason Beck | 13 February 2008 (age 18) | (Liechtenstein Football Association) FC Vaduz |
| | MF | Levin Lampert | 3 July 2008 (age 18) | (Liechtenstein Football Association) FC Vaduz |
| | FW | Noah Biedermann | 23 July 2008 (age 18) | (Liechtenstein Football Association) FC Ruggell |
| | FW | Janai Balbuena | 15 September 2009 (age 17) | (Liechtenstein Football Association) FC Vaduz |

== U19 European Championship record ==
UEFA European U-19 Championship record
| Year | Round |
|---|---|
| (Liechtenstein) 2003 | Group stage |
| (Switzerland) 2004 | Did not qualify |
| (Northern Ireland) 2005 | Did not qualify |
| (Poland) 2006 | Did not qualify |
| (Austria) 2007 | Did not qualify |
| (Czech Republic) 2008 | Did not qualify |
| (Ukraine) 2009 | Did not qualify |
| (France) 2010 | Did not qualify |
| (Romania) 2011 | Did not qualify |
| (Estonia) 2012 | Did not enter |
| (Lithuania) 2013 | Did not enter |
| (Hungary) 2014 | Did not qualify |
| (Greece) 2015 | Did not qualify |
| (Germany) 2016 | Did not qualify |
| (Georgia (country)) 2017 | Did not qualify |
| (Finland) 2018 | Did not qualify |
| (Armenia) 2019 | Did not qualify |
| (Northern Ireland) 2020 | Cancelled |
| (Romania) 2021 | Cancelled |
| (Slovakia) 2022 | Did not enter |

== See also ==
- Liechtenstein national football team
- Liechtenstein national under-21 football team
- Liechtenstein national under-17 football team
