= Liechtenstein national under-21 football team =

National youth association football team

Liechtenstein U-21
- Association: Liechtenstein Football Association (Liechtensteiner Fussballverband)
- Head coach: Michael Koller
- Most caps: Jens Hofer (22)
- Top scorer: Simon Kühne / Fabio Luque Notaro (3)
First colours	Second colours

First international
- Liechtenstein 1–4 Northern Ireland (Vaduz, Liechtenstein, 12 April 2006)

Biggest win
- Liechtenstein 3–1 Gibraltar (Eschen, Liechtenstein; 21 June 2025)

Biggest defeat
- Portugal 11–0 Liechtenstein (Vizela, Portugal; 7 October 2021)

UEFA U-21 Championship
- Appearances: 0
- Best result: None

The Liechtenstein national under-21 football team represents the under-21s of Liechtenstein in the UEFA U-21 Championship, and is controlled by the Liechtenstein Football Association, the governing body of football in Liechtenstein. On 5 October 2022, it was announced that this team would be dissolved for 2023 and 2024, and would return in time for the UEFA U21-Championship 2027 qualification campaign. This decision was made because most of the higher quality players in this age category would end up playing for the senior team.

== Overview ==
The Liechtenstein under-21s first attempted to qualify for the UEFA U-21 Championship in 2006, where they played a home-and-home against Northern Ireland, losing 1–8 on aggregate, thus being eliminated from qualifying.

The Liechtenstein under-21s lost their first 59 competitive fixtures, being outscored 232–17. They avoided defeat for the first time on 6 June 2019, beating Azerbaijan during qualifying for the 2021 UEFA European Under-21 Championship tournament.

== UEFA U-21 Championship record ==
Year	Result	GP	W	D	L	GS	GA
(Netherlands) 2007	did not qualify	2	0	0	2	1	8
(Sweden) 2009	did not qualify	8	0	0	8	4	31
(Denmark) 2011	did not qualify	8	0	0	8	1	27
(Israel) 2013	did not qualify	8	0	0	8	4	35
(Czech Republic) 2015	did not qualify	8	0	0	8	3	34
(Poland) 2017	did not qualify	10	0	0	10	1	40
(Italy) / (San Marino) 2019	did not qualify	10	0	0	10	2	42
(Hungary) / (Slovenia) 2021	did not qualify	10	1	0	9	3	35
(Romania) / (Georgia (country)) 2023	did not qualify	10	0	0	10	0	63
(Slovakia) 2025	Did not enter						

== Matches ==
=== 2025 ===
21 June 2025 Friendly	Liechtenstein	3–1	Gibraltar	Eschen, Liechtenstein
17:00	Luque Notaro 17', 26', 59' (pen.)	Report	Caetano 85'	Stadium: Sportpark Eschen-Mauren; Referee: Déborah Anex (Switzerland)

== Current squad ==
=== Last squad ===
- The following players were called up for the friendly match.
- Match dates: 21 June 2025
- Opposition: Gibraltar
- Caps and goals correct as of: 21 June 2025, after the match against Gibraltar

No.	Pos.	Player	Date of birth (age)	Caps	Goals	Club
	GK	Lorin Beck	27 June 2006 (age 20)	0	0	(Liechtenstein Football Association) Vaduz
	GK	Elias Burri	5 January 2005 (age 21)	1	0	(Swiss Football Association) Buchs
	GK	Silvan Schädler	6 February 2006 (age 20)	0	0	(Liechtenstein Football Association) Vaduz
	DF	Luca Beck	14 August 2005 (age 21)	1	0	(Liechtenstein Football Association) Vaduz
	DF	Fabio Böni	5 September 2004 (age 22)	0	0	(Swiss Football Association) Uznach
	DF	Lucas Hasler	3 June 2004 (age 22)	0	0	(Liechtenstein Football Association) Ruggell
	DF	David Jäger	4 July 2004 (age 22)	2	0	(Liechtenstein Football Association) Vaduz
	DF	Noel Nigg	2 February 2007 (age 19)	1	0	(Liechtenstein Football Association) Triesenberg
	DF	Felix Oberwaditzer	14 March 2006 (age 20)	0	0	(Austrian Football Association) Rheindorf Altach
	DF	Yannic Walser	10 August 2006 (age 20)	1	0	(Swiss Football Association) Altstätten
	DF	Jonas Weissenhofer	25 July 2006 (age 20)	1	0	(Austrian Football Association) VfB Hohenems
	MF	Yonas Abidi	18 December 2006 (age 19)	0	0	(Liechtenstein Football Association) Triesenberg
	MF	Rafael Blumenthal	13 November 2005 (age 20)	1	0	(Liechtenstein Football Association) Vaduz
	MF	Robin Gassner	11 October 2006 (age 20)	0	0	(Liechtenstein Football Association) Triesenberg
	MF	Julian Keller	23 July 2006 (age 20)	1	0	(Liechtenstein Football Association) Vaduz
	MF	Philip Käppeli	16 April 2005 (age 21)	1	0	(German Football Association) 1. FC Rielasingen-Arlen
	MF	Benjamin Konzett	1 July 2007 (age 19)	1	0	(Liechtenstein Football Association) Triesen
	MF	Riccardo Licci	13 October 2006 (age 20)	1	0	(Swiss Football Association) Sevelen
	MF	Louis Linsmaier	16 November 2005 (age 20)	1	0	(Liechtenstein Football Association) Vaduz
	MF	Benjamin Luchs	5 September 2004 (age 22)	0	0	(Liechtenstein Football Association) Ruggell
	MF	Noah Marxer	28 August 2006 (age 20)	1	0	(Liechtenstein Football Association) Vaduz
	MF	Severin Schlegel	24 July 2004 (age 22)	9	0	(Liechtenstein Football Association) Vaduz
	MF	Francesco Sestito	2 June 2005 (age 21)	1	0	(Liechtenstein Football Association) Vaduz
	FW	Florian Allgäuer	9 December 2006 (age 19)	1	0	(Liechtenstein Football Association) Ruggell
	FW	Juliano Cocetrone	1 September 2006 (age 20)	1	0	(Swiss Football Association) Stäfa 1895
	FW	Matthias Hoop	September 13, 2006 (age 20)	0	0	(Liechtenstein Football Association) Ruggell
	FW	Fabio Luque Notaro	31 August 2005 (age 21)	3	3	(Liechtenstein Football Association) Vaduz
	FW	Serhat Saglam	27 May 2007 (age 19)	1	0	(Liechtenstein Football Association) Vaduz

== See also ==
- Liechtenstein national football team
