= Bosnia and Herzegovina national football team results (1995–2019) =

This article lists all the Bosnia and Herzegovina national football team results between 1995 and 2019.

For results after 2019, see Bosnia and Herzegovina national football team results (2020–present).

== Results ==
=== 1993 ===
12 September Unofficial friendly	Iran	1–3	Bosnia and Herzegovina	Tehran, Iran
18:45 UTC+4:30	Shirmohammadi (?)	Report	Behlulovic (?); Baljic (?); Granov (?)	Stadium: Azadi Stadium; Referee: Davoud Karimpour (Iran)

=== 1994 ===
19 May Unofficial friendly	Real Sociedad	3–1	Bosnia & Herzegovina XI	Azpeitia, Spain
	Oceano 28'; Imanol 36'; Luis Pérez 61'	Report	Hadžiabdić 37'	Stadium: Garmendipe; Attendance: 1,000; Referee: José Luis Colina (Spain)

=== 1995 ===
30 November Friendly	Albania	2–0	Bosnia and Herzegovina	Tirana, Albania
	Qendro 30'; Dobi 50'	Report		Stadium: Qemal Stafa Stadium; Attendance: 10,000; Referee: Hristo Danilovski (Macedonia)

=== 1996 ===
24 April Friendly	Bosnia and Herzegovina	0–0	Albania	Zenica, Bosnia and Herzegovina
		Report		Stadium: Bilino Polje Stadium; Attendance: 6,120; Referee: Dragutin Karlo Poljak (Croatia)

1 September 1998 FIFA World Cup qualification	Greece	3–0	Bosnia and Herzegovina	Kalamata, Greece
17:30 UTC+3	Ouzounidis 41'; Apostolakis 79'; Nikolaidis 84'	Report		Stadium: Kalamata Metropolitan Stadium; Attendance: 4,088; Referee: Günter Benkö (Austria)

8 October 1998 FIFA World Cup qualification	Bosnia and Herzegovina	1–4	Croatia	Bologna, Italy (Note: Match played in Bologna due to the renovation of the Koševo Stadium.)
20:00 UTC+2	Salihamidžić 25'	Report	Bilić 13'; Vlaović 32'; Bokšić 64', 85'	Stadium: Stadio Renato Dall'Ara; Attendance: 1,500; Referee: Atanas Uzunov (Bulgaria)

6 November Friendly	Bosnia and Herzegovina	2–1	Italy	Sarajevo, Bosnia and Herzegovina
17:00 UTC+2	Salihamidžić 6'; Bolić 44'	Report	Chiesa 10'	Stadium: Koševo Stadium; Attendance: 40,000; Referee: Robert Sedlacek (Austria)

10 November 1998 FIFA World Cup qualification	Slovenia	1–2	Bosnia and Herzegovina	Ljubljana, Slovenia
15:00 UTC+1	Zahovič 41' (pen.)	Report	Bolić 5'; Kodro 33'	Stadium: Bežigrad Stadium; Attendance: 3,200; Referee: Charles Agius (Malta)

18 December Friendly	Brazil	1–0	Bosnia and Herzegovina	Manaus, Brazil
14:00 UTC-4	Ronaldo 75'	Report		Stadium: Vivaldão; Attendance: 20,000; Referee: Sidrack Marinho dos Santos (Brazil)

=== 1997 ===
22 February Dunhill Cup Group B	Vietnam	0–4	Bosnia and Herzegovina	Kuala Lumpur, Malaysia
		Report	Muharemović 29'; Pintul 45' (pen.); Smječanin 52' (pen.); Repuh 87'	Stadium: Merdeka Stadium; Attendance: 18,000; Referee: Nik Ahmad Haji Yaakub (Malaysia)

24 February Dunhill Cup Group B	Zimbabwe	2–2	Bosnia and Herzegovina	Kuala Lumpur, Malaysia
	Dinyero 24'; Gorowa 75'	Report	Hrnjić 58'; Muharemović 67'	Stadium: Merdeka Stadium; Attendance: 15,000; Referee: Selearajin Subramanian (Malaysia)

26 February Dunhill Cup Group B	Indonesia	0–2	Bosnia and Herzegovina	Kuala Lumpur, Malaysia
		Report	Pintul 30' (pen.); Hrnjić 44'	Stadium: Merdeka Stadium; Attendance: 20,000; Referee: Nik Ahmad Haji Yaakub (Malaysia)

28 February Dunhill Cup Semi-final	Malaysia	0–1	Bosnia and Herzegovina	Kuala Lumpur, Malaysia
		Report	Hrnjić 36'	Stadium: Merdeka Stadium; Attendance: 40,000; Referee: Kim Young Yoo (South Korea)

2 March Dunhill Cup Final	China	3–0	Bosnia and Herzegovina	Kuala Lumpur, Malaysia
	Li Jinyu 54'; Zhang Xiaorui 59'; Hao Haidong 81'	Report		Stadium: Merdeka Stadium; Attendance: 15,000; Referee: Hazri Abdullah (Malaysia)

2 April 1998 FIFA World Cup qualification	Bosnia and Herzegovina	0–1	Greece	Sarajevo, Bosnia and Herzegovina
15:30 UTC+2		Report	Frantzeskos 72'	Stadium: Koševo Stadium; Attendance: 33,000; Referee: Alain Sars (France)

8 June 1998 FIFA World Cup qualification	Denmark	2–0	Bosnia and Herzegovina	Copenhagen, Denmark
15:00 UTC+2	Rieper 67'; Molnar 90'	Report		Stadium: Parken Stadium; Attendance: 41,592; Referee: Karol Ihring (Slovakia)

20 August 1998 FIFA World Cup qualification	Bosnia and Herzegovina	3–0	Denmark	Sarajevo, Bosnia and Herzegovina
20:30 UTC+2	Mujčin 17'; Bolić 23' (pen.), 32' (pen.)	Report		Stadium: Koševo Stadium; Attendance: 36,500; Referee: Vitor Manuel de Melo Pereira (Portugal)

6 September 1998 FIFA World Cup qualification	Croatia	3–2	Bosnia and Herzegovina	Zagreb, Croatia
20:15 UTC+2	Bilić 27'; Marić 40'; Boban 80'	Report	Jarni 18' (o.g.); Salihamidžić 55'	Stadium: Maksimir Stadium; Attendance: 16,518; Referee: Hugh Dallas (Scotland)

10 September 1998 FIFA World Cup qualification	Bosnia and Herzegovina	1–0	Slovenia	Sarajevo, Bosnia and Herzegovina
20:15 UTC+2	Bolić 23'	Report		Stadium: Koševo Stadium; Attendance: 18,000; Referee: Taras Bezubiak (Russia)

5 November Friendly	Tunisia	2–1	Bosnia and Herzegovina	Tunis, Tunisia
	Younes 5', 33'		Bolić 42'	Stadium: Stade El Menzah; Attendance: 15,000; Referee: Mohammad el-Habib (Libya)

=== 1998 ===
14 May Friendly	Argentina	5–0	Bosnia and Herzegovina	Córdoba, Argentina
	Batistuta 6', 24', 80'; Zanetti 55'; Ortega 61'	Report		Stadium: Estadio Córdoba; Attendance: 44,243; Referee: Luis Mariano Peña Catalán (Chile)

3 June Friendly	Macedonia	1–1	Bosnia and Herzegovina	Skopje, Macedonia
20:00 UTC+2	Stojanoski 6'	Report	Brkić 76'	Stadium: City Park; Attendance: 3,500; Referee: Miroslav Radoman (Yugoslavia)

19 August UEFA Euro 2000 qualifying	Bosnia and Herzegovina	1–0	Faroe Islands	Sarajevo, Bosnia and Herzegovina
20:30 UTC+2	Baljić 65'	Report		Stadium: Koševo Stadium; Attendance: 20,000; Referee: Tomasz Mikulski (Poland)

6 September UEFA Euro 2000 qualifying	Bosnia and Herzegovina	1–1	Estonia	Sarajevo, Bosnia and Herzegovina
20:30 UTC+2	Barbarez 74' (pen.)	Report	Hibić 29' (o.g.)	Stadium: Koševo Stadium; Attendance: 14,750; Referee: Charles Agius (Malta)

10 October UEFA Euro 2000 qualifying	Bosnia and Herzegovina	1–3	Czech Republic	Sarajevo, Bosnia and Herzegovina
17:45 UTC+2	Topić 87'	Report	Beránek 12'; Šmicer 58'; Kuka 90'	Stadium: Koševo Stadium; Attendance: 28,000; Referee: Domenico Messina (Italy)

14 October UEFA Euro 2000 qualifying	Lithuania	4–2	Bosnia and Herzegovina	Vilnius, Lithuania
19:00 UTC+2	Ivanauskas 11', 67', 77'; Baltušnikas 90+3'	Report	Konjić 5'; Baljić 68'	Stadium: Žalgiris Stadium; Attendance: 1,000; Referee: Manfred Schüttengruber (Austria)

=== 1999 ===
27 January Friendly	Malta	2–1	Bosnia and Herzegovina	Ta' Qali, Malta
19:30 UTC+1	Carabott 45'; Busuttil 85'	Report	Salihamidžić 29'	Stadium: National Stadium; Attendance: 1,751; Referee: Marco Tura (San Marino)

10 March Friendly	Hungary	1–1	Bosnia and Herzegovina	Budapest, Hungary
19:30 UTC+1	Illés 66' (pen.)	Report	Kodro 38'	Stadium: Üllői úti stadion Attendance: 7,792; Referee: Martin Ingvarsson (Sweden)

5 June UEFA Euro 2000 qualifying	Bosnia and Herzegovina	2–0	Lithuania	Sarajevo, Bosnia and Herzegovina
20:30 UTC+2	Kodro 26' (pen.); Bolić 90'	Report		Stadium: Koševo Stadium; Attendance: 6,100; Referee: Arturo Daudén Ibáñez (Spain)

9 June UEFA Euro 2000 qualifying	Faroe Islands	2–2	Bosnia and Herzegovina	Toftir, Faroe Islands
19:00 UTC+1	Arge 37', 48'	Report	Bolić 13', 50'	Stadium: Svangaskarð; Attendance: 4,600; Referee: Peter Jones (England)

18 August Friendly	Liechtenstein	0–0	Bosnia and Herzegovina	Vaduz, Liechtenstein
19:30 UTC+2		Report		Stadium: Rheinpark Stadion; Attendance: 1,300; Referee: Massimo Busacca (Switzerland)

4 September UEFA Euro 2000 qualifying	Bosnia and Herzegovina	1–2	Scotland	Sarajevo, Bosnia and Herzegovina
20:30 UTC+2	Bolić 23'	Report	Hutchison 13'; Dodds 45'	Stadium: Koševo Stadium; Attendance: 15,600; Referee: Nikolai Levnikov (Russia)

8 September UEFA Euro 2000 qualifying	Czech Republic	3–0	Bosnia and Herzegovina	Teplice, Czech Republic
20:30 UTC+2	Koller 26'; Berger 59' (pen.); Poborský 67'	Report		Stadium: Na Stínadlech; Attendance: 10,112; Referee: Karl-Erik Nilsson (Sweden)

5 October (Note: Originally to be played in 27 March 1999, postponed because of the disruption caused to travel from the Balkan region by the Nato air strikes on Serbia.) UEFA Euro 2000 qualifying	Scotland	1–0	Bosnia and Herzegovina	Glasgow, Scotland
20:00 UTC+1	Collins 26' (pen.)	Report		Stadium: Ibrox Stadium; Attendance: 30,574; Referee: Leif Sundell (Sweden)

9 October UEFA Euro 2000 qualifying	Estonia	1–4	Bosnia and Herzegovina	Tallinn, Estonia
16:00 UTC+3	Oper 4'	Report	Baljić 41', 57', 67', 87'	Stadium: Kadrioru Stadium; Attendance: 800; Referee: Roelof Luinge (Netherlands)

=== 2000 ===
24 January Friendly	Qatar	2–0	Bosnia and Herzegovina	Doha, Qatar
	Mustafa 65', 90'	Report		Stadium: Grand Hamad Stadium; Attendance: 1,500; Referee: Hani Tali Balan (Qatar)

11 March Friendly	Jordan	0–0	Bosnia and Herzegovina	Amman, Jordan
14:00 UTC+3		Report		Stadium: Amman International Stadium; Attendance: 2,000; Referee: Abdullah Omar (Jordan)

15 March Friendly	Jordan	1–2	Bosnia and Herzegovina	Amman, Jordan
16:00 UTC+3	Salim 28'	Report	Ihtjarević 20'; Joldić 60'	Stadium: Amman International Stadium; Attendance: 3,000; Referee: Salem Mahmoud (Jordan)

29 March Friendly	Bosnia and Herzegovina	1–0	Macedonia	Zenica, Bosnia and Herzegovina
18:00 UTC+2	Konjić 89'	Report		Stadium: Bilino Polje Stadium; Attendance: 17,000; Referee: Miroslav Vitković (Croatia)

16 August Friendly	Bosnia and Herzegovina	2–0	Turkey	Sarajevo, Bosnia and Herzegovina
19:15 UTC+2	Bolić 39'; Topić 90'	Report		Stadium: Koševo Stadium; Attendance: 7,000; Referee: Delce Jakimovski (Macedonia)

2 September 2002 FIFA World Cup qualification	Bosnia and Herzegovina	1–2	Spain	Sarajevo, Bosnia and Herzegovina
20:15 UTC+2	Baljić 41'	Report	Gerard 39'; Etxeberria 72'	Stadium: Koševo Stadium; Attendance: 28,700; Referee: Herbert Fandel (Germany)

11 October 2002 FIFA World Cup qualification	Israel	3–1	Bosnia and Herzegovina	Tel Aviv, Israel
20:25 UTC+3	Berkovic 12'; Abukasis 62'; Katan 76'	Report	Akrapović 48'	Stadium: Ramat Gan Stadium; Attendance: 30,000; Referee: Dick Jol (Netherlands)

=== 2001 ===
12 January Millennium Super Soccer Cup Group Stage	Bangladesh	0–2	Bosnia and Herzegovina	Kochi, India
19:30 UTC+5:30		Report	Hota 55', 58'	Stadium: Jawaharlal Nehru Stadium; Attendance: 20,000; Referee: Vasan Surem (Indonesia)

14 January Millennium Super Soccer Cup Group Stage	FR Yugoslavia	1–1	Bosnia and Herzegovina	Kochi, India
17:30 UTC+5:30	Petković 86'	Report	Bešlija 75'	Stadium: Jawaharlal Nehru Stadium; Attendance: 30,000; Referee: Halim Abdul Hamid (Malaysia)

18 January Millennium Super Soccer Cup Quarter-finals	Uruguay	2–3 (a.e.t.)	Bosnia and Herzegovina	Kochi, India
19:00 UTC+5:30	Pereira 13'; Segalés 58'	Report	Kavazović 37'; Muharemović 83'; Bešlija 97'	Stadium: Jawaharlal Nehru Stadium; Attendance: 20,000; Referee: Halim Abdul Hamid (Malaysia)

22 January Millennium Super Soccer Cup Semi-final	Chile	0–1	Bosnia and Herzegovina	Kolkata, India
17:00 UTC+5:30		Report	Muharemović 77'	Stadium: Salt Lake Stadium; Attendance: 25,000; Referee: Rungkly Mangkol (Thailand)

25 January Millennium Super Soccer Cup Final	FR Yugoslavia	2–0	Bosnia and Herzegovina	Kolkata, India
19:00 UTC+5:30	Duljaj 7'; Bogdanović 45'	Report		Stadium: Salt Lake Stadium; Attendance: 45,000; Referee: Rungkly Mangkol (Thailand)

28 February Friendly	Bosnia and Herzegovina	1–1	Hungary	Zenica, Bosnia and Herzegovina
17:30 UTC+1	Barbarez 22'	Report	Horváth 13'	Stadium: Bilino Polje Stadium; Attendance: 5,000; Referee: Sašo Lazarevski (Macedonia)

24 March 2002 FIFA World Cup qualification	Bosnia and Herzegovina	1–1	Austria	Sarajevo, Bosnia and Herzegovina
20:30 UTC+1	Barbarez 43'	Report	Baur 61'	Stadium: Koševo Stadium; Attendance: 25,000; Referee: Tom Henning Øvrebø (Norway)

28 March 2002 FIFA World Cup qualification	Liechtenstein	0–3	Bosnia and Herzegovina	Vaduz, Liechtenstein
20:00 UTC+2		Report	Barbarez 10', 72'; Hota 89'	Stadium: Rheinpark; Attendance: 3,400; Referee: Andrejs Sipailo (Latvia)

2 June 2002 FIFA World Cup qualification	Spain	4–1	Bosnia and Herzegovina	Oviedo, Spain
21:30 UTC+2	Hierro 26'; Moreno 76'; Raúl 89'; Tristán 90'	Report	Bešlija 41'	Stadium: Nuevo Carlos Tartiere; Attendance: 30,000; Referee: Roy Helge Olsen (Norway)

20 June Merdeka Tournament Group stage	Slovakia	0–1	Bosnia and Herzegovina	Shah Alam, Malaysia
		Report	Bešlija 68'	Stadium: Shah Alam Stadium; Attendance: 8,000; Referee: Sunkhiddin Mohammad Slaeh (Malaysia)

23 June Merdeka Tournament Group stage	Bahrain	0–1	Bosnia and Herzegovina	Shah Alam, Malaysia
		Report	Kulenović 38'	Stadium: Shah Alam Stadium; Attendance: 4,000; Referee: Halid Abdul Hamid (Malaysia)

25 June Merdeka Tournament Group stage	Malaysia	2–2	Bosnia and Herzegovina	Shah Alam, Malaysia
	Suparman 65', 80'	Report	Pelić 48'; Mešanović 70'	Stadium: Shah Alam Stadium; Attendance: 5,000; Referee: Hwang Yunyi (China)

27 June Merdeka Tournament Semi-final	Malaysia U23	0–2	Bosnia and Herzegovina	Shah Alam, Malaysia
		Report	Hurić 10'; Kulenović 18'	Stadium: Shah Alam Stadium; Attendance: 60,000; Referee: Hie Yuanyin (China)

30 June Merdeka Tournament Final	Uzbekistan	2–1	Bosnia and Herzegovina	Shah Alam, Malaysia
	Koshelev 83'; Hamidullaev 119'	Report	Brašnić 90'	Stadium: Shah Alam Stadium; Attendance: 40,000; Referee: Halim Abdul Hamid (Malaysia)

22 July Friendly	Bosnia and Herzegovina	2–2	Iran	Bihać, Bosnia and Herzegovina
	Seferović 6'; Dujmović 11'	Report	Dinmohammadi 16'; Fatemi 90'	Stadium: Stadion pod Borićima; Attendance: 7,000; Referee: Darko Čeferin (Slovenia)

8 August LG Cup Semi-final	South Africa	2–4	Bosnia and Herzegovina	Tehran, Iran
	Makhubela 15', 70' (pen.)	Report	Muharemović 35', 80'; Adžem 40'; Husić 90'	Stadium: Azadi Stadium; Attendance: 40,000; Referee: Hamirad (Iran)

10 August LG Cup Final	Iran	4–0	Bosnia and Herzegovina	Tehran, Iran
	Hasheminasab 6', 90' (pen.); Karimi 67'; Daei 82'	Report		Stadium: Azadi Stadium; Attendance: 75,000; Referee: Tajuldeen Faris (Syria)

15 August Friendly	Bosnia and Herzegovina	2–0	Malta	Sarajevo, Bosnia and Herzegovina
19:00 UTC+2	Baljić 17', 45'	Report		Stadium: Stadion Grbavica; Attendance: 5,000; Referee: Attila Ábrahám (Hungary)

1 September 2002 FIFA World Cup qualification	Bosnia and Herzegovina	0–0	Israel	Sarajevo, Bosnia and Herzegovina
20:15 UTC+2		Report		Stadium: Koševo Stadium; Attendance: 7,700; Referee: Dieter Schoch (Switzerland)

5 September 2002 FIFA World Cup qualification	Austria	2–0	Bosnia and Herzegovina	Vienna, Austria
20:30 UTC+2	Herzog 38', 87'	Report		Stadium: Ernst-Happel-Stadion; Attendance: 23,200; Referee: Graham Barber (England)

7 October 2002 FIFA World Cup qualification	Bosnia and Herzegovina	5–0	Liechtenstein	Zenica, Bosnia and Herzegovina
20:15 UTC+2	Konjić 33'; Baljić 45' (pen.), 82' (pen.); Šabić 69'; Dodik 85'	Report		Stadium: Bilino Polje Stadium; Attendance: 6,000; Referee: John McDermott (Ireland)

=== 2002 ===
27 March Friendly	Bosnia and Herzegovina	4–4	Macedonia	Sarajevo, Bosnia and Herzegovina
19:00 UTC+1	Bolić 3', 67'; Barbarez 16', 38'		Šakiri 53', 76', 88'; Ćirić 65' (pen.)	Stadium: Stadion Grbavica; Attendance: 3,500; Referee: Alojzije Šupraha (Croatia)

17 April Friendly	Croatia	2–0	Bosnia and Herzegovina	Zagreb, Croatia
19:00 UTC+2	Olić 44'; Šuker 52' (pen.)			Stadium: Stadion Maksimir; Attendance: 3,569; Referee: Stefan Meßner (Austria)

21 August Friendly	Bosnia and Herzegovina	0–2	FR Yugoslavia	Sarajevo, Bosnia and Herzegovina
18:00 UTC+2			Krstajić 34'; Kovačević 41'	Stadium: Koševo Stadium; Attendance: 12,000; Referee: Željko Širić (Croatia)

7 September UEFA Euro 2004 qualifying	Bosnia and Herzegovina	0–3	Romania	Sarajevo, Bosnia and Herzegovina
20:15 UTC+2		Report	Chivu 8'; Munteanu 10'; Ganea 28'	Stadium: Koševo Stadium; Attendance: 1,830; Referee: Lucílio Batista (Portugal)

11 October Friendly	Bosnia and Herzegovina	1–1	Germany	Sarajevo, Bosnia and Herzegovina
20:30 UTC+2	Baljić 21'		Jancker 56'	Stadium: Stadion Grbavica; Attendance: 5,000; Referee: Massimo De Santis (Italy)

16 October UEFA Euro 2004 qualifying	Norway	2–0	Bosnia and Herzegovina	Oslo, Norway
20:00 UTC+2	Lundekvam 7'; J. A. Riise 26'	Report		Stadium: Ullevaal Stadion; Attendance: 24,169; Referee: Michal Beneš (Czech Republic)

=== 2003 ===
12 February Friendly	Wales	2–2	Bosnia and Herzegovina	Cardiff, Wales
20:00 UTC+0	Earnshaw 10'; Hartson 75'		Baljić 5'; Barbarez 65'	Stadium: Millennium Stadium; Attendance: 25,000; Referee: David Malcolm (Northern Ireland)

29 March UEFA Euro 2004 qualifying	Bosnia and Herzegovina	2–0	Luxembourg	Zenica, Bosnia and Herzegovina
20:15 UTC+1	Bolić 58'; Barbarez 75'	Report		Stadium: Bilino Polje Stadium; Attendance: 10,000; Referee: Jouni Hyytiä (Finland)

2 April UEFA Euro 2004 qualifying	Denmark	0–2	Bosnia and Herzegovina	Copenhagen, Denmark
19:15 UTC+2		Report	Barbarez 23'; Baljić 29'	Stadium: Parken Stadium; Attendance: 30,845; Referee: Anton Stredák (Slovakia)

7 June UEFA Euro 2004 qualifying	Romania	2–0	Bosnia and Herzegovina	Craiova, Romania
20:00 UTC+3	Mutu 46'; Ganea 88'	Report		Stadium: Stadionul Ion Oblemenco; Attendance: 19,900; Referee: Ruud Bossen (Netherlands)

6 September UEFA Euro 2004 qualifying	Bosnia and Herzegovina	1–0	Norway	Zenica, Bosnia and Herzegovina
20:15 UTC+2	Bajramović 86'	Report		Stadium: Bilino Polje; Attendance: 18,000; Referee: Stéphane Bré (France)

10 September UEFA Euro 2004 qualifying	Luxembourg	0–1	Bosnia and Herzegovina	Luxembourg City, Luxembourg
20:00 UTC+2		Report	Barbarez 36'	Stadium: Stade Josy Barthel; Attendance: 3,425; Referee: Costas Kapitanis (Cyprus)

11 October UEFA Euro 2004 qualifying	Bosnia and Herzegovina	1–1	Denmark	Sarajevo, Bosnia and Herzegovina
18:00 UTC+2	Bolić 39'	Report	Jørgensen 12'	Stadium: Koševo Stadium; Attendance: 32,000; Referee: Graham Barber (England)

=== 2004 ===
18 February Friendly	Macedonia	1–0	Bosnia and Herzegovina	Skopje, Macedonia
18:00 UTC+1	Pandev 22'	Report		Stadium: Gradski stadion Attendance: 8,000; Referee: Momchil Vraikov (Bulgaria)

31 March Friendly	Luxembourg	1–2	Bosnia and Herzegovina	Luxembourg City, Luxembourg
20:00 UTC+2	Huss 87'	Report	Misimović 63'; Bolić 71'	Stadium: Stade Josy Barthel; Attendance: 2,000; Referee: René Rogalla (Switzerland)

28 April Friendly	Bosnia and Herzegovina	1–0	Finland	Zenica, Bosnia and Herzegovina
20:00 UTC+2	Misimović 88'	Report		Stadium: Bilino Polje Stadium; Attendance: 21,000; Referee: Emil Božinovski (Macedonia)

18 August Friendly	France	1–1	Bosnia and Herzegovina	Rennes, France
20:45 UTC+2	Luyindula 7'	Report	Grlić 37'	Stadium: Stade de la Route de Lorient; Attendance: 26,527; Referee: Dougie McDonald (Scotland)

8 September 2006 FIFA World Cup qualification	Bosnia and Herzegovina	1–1	Spain	Zenica, Bosnia and Herzegovina
20:15 UTC+2	Bolić 79'	(Report)	Vicente 65'	Stadium: Bilino Polje Stadium; Attendance: 14,380; Referee: Massimo De Santis (Italy)

9 October 2006 FIFA World Cup qualification	Bosnia and Herzegovina	0–0	Serbia and Montenegro	Sarajevo, Bosnia and Herzegovina
20:15 UTC+2		(Report)		Stadium: Asim Ferhatović Hase Stadium; Attendance: 22,440; Referee: Gilles Veissière (France)

=== 2005 ===
2 February Friendly	Iran	2–1	Bosnia and Herzegovina	Tehran, Iran
16:15 UTC+3:30	Daei 47'; Borhani 75'	Report	Bolić 71'	Stadium: Azadi Stadium; Attendance: 15,000; Referee: Masoud Moradi (Iran)

26 March 2006 FIFA World Cup qualification	Belgium	4–1	Bosnia and Herzegovina	Brussels, Belgium
20:15 UTC+1	Mpenza 15', 54'; Daerden 44'; Buffel 77'	(Report)	Bajramović 1'	Stadium: King Baudouin Stadium; Attendance: 36,700; Referee: Vladimír Hriňák (Slovakia)

30 March 2006 FIFA World Cup qualification	Bosnia and Herzegovina	1–1	Lithuania	Sarajevo, Bosnia and Herzegovina
20:00 UTC+2	Bolić 21'	(Report)	Stankevičius 61'	Stadium: Asim Ferhatović Hase Stadium; Attendance: 6,000; Referee: Yuri Baskakov (Russia)

4 June 2006 FIFA World Cup qualification	San Marino	1–3	Bosnia and Herzegovina	Serravalle, San Marino
20:30 UTC+2	Selva 39'	(Report)	Salihamidžić 17', 38'; Barbarez 75'	Stadium: Stadio Olimpico; Attendance: 750; Referee: Bülent Demirlek (Turkey)

8 June 2006 FIFA World Cup qualification	Spain	1–1	Bosnia and Herzegovina	Valencia, Spain
22:00 UTC+2	Marchena 90+6'	(Report)	Misimović 39'	Stadium: Estadio Mestalla; Attendance: 38,041; Referee: Stephen Bennett (England)

17 August Friendly	Estonia	1–0	Bosnia and Herzegovina	Tallinn, Estonia
18:00 UTC+2	Viikmäe 35'	Report		Stadium: Lilleküla Stadium; Attendance: 4,000; Referee: Peter Fröjdfeldt (Sweden)

3 September 2006 FIFA World Cup qualification	Bosnia and Herzegovina	1–0	Belgium	Zenica, Bosnia and Herzegovina
20:15 UTC+2	Barbarez 62'	(Report)		Stadium: Bilino Polje Stadium; Attendance: 12,000; Referee: Olegário Benquerença (Portugal)

7 September 2006 FIFA World Cup qualification	Lithuania	0–1	Bosnia and Herzegovina	Vilnius, Lithuania
20:00 UTC+3		(Report)	Barbarez 28'	Stadium: Vėtra Stadium; Attendance: 4,000; Referee: Viktor Kassai (Hungary)

8 October 2006 FIFA World Cup qualification	Bosnia and Herzegovina	3–0	San Marino	Zenica, Bosnia and Herzegovina
20:00 UTC+2	Bolić 46', 75', 82'	(Report)		Stadium: Bilino Polje Stadium; Attendance: 8,500; Referee: Alain Hamer (Luxembourg)

12 October 2006 FIFA World Cup qualification	Serbia and Montenegro	1–0	Bosnia and Herzegovina	Belgrade, Serbia and Montenegro
20:30 UTC+2	Kežman 7'	(Report)		Stadium: Stadion Crvena Zvezda; Attendance: 46,305; Referee: Kyros Vassaras (Greece)

=== 2006 ===
28 February Friendly	Japan	2–2	Bosnia and Herzegovina	Dortmund, Germany
13:20 UTC+2	Takahara 45'; Nakata 90+3'	Report	Misimović 57' (pen.); Spahić 67'	Stadium: Westfalenstadion; Attendance: 7,000; Referee: Franz-Xaver Wack (Germany)

26 May Friendly	South Korea	2–0	Bosnia and Herzegovina	Seoul, South Korea
18:00 UTC+9	Seol Ki-hyeon 50'; Cho Jae-jin 90+3'	Report		Stadium: Seoul World Cup Stadium; Attendance: 64,836; Referee: Cheung Yim Yau (Hong Kong)

31 May Friendly	Iran	5–2	Bosnia and Herzegovina	Tehran, Iran
18:00 UTC+3:30	Madanchi 26'; Rezaei 45'; Hashemian 45+2'; Enayati 89'; Khatibi 90+2'	Report	Misimović 4'; Barbarez 17'	Stadium: Azadi Stadium; Attendance: 50,000; Referee: Subkhiddin Mohd Salleh (Malaysia)

16 August Friendly	Bosnia and Herzegovina	1–2	France	Sarajevo, Bosnia and Herzegovina
21:00 UTC+2	Barbarez 15'	Report	Gallas 40'; Faubert 90+1'	Stadium: Asim Ferhatović Hase Stadium; Attendance: 35,000; Referee: Franz-Xaver Wack (Germany)

2 September UEFA Euro 2008 qualifying	Malta	2–5	Bosnia and Herzegovina	Ta' Qali, Malta
18:15 UTC+2	Pace 6'; Mifsud 86'	Report	Barbarez 4'; Hrgović 10'; Bartolović 45+1'; Muslimović 49'; Misimović 51'	Stadium: Ta' Qali Stadium; Attendance: 2,000; Referee: Thomas Veljgaard (Denmark)

6 September UEFA Euro 2008 qualifying	Bosnia and Herzegovina	1–3	Hungary	Zenica, Bosnia and Herzegovina
20:15 UTC+2	Misimović 64' (pen.)	Report	Huszti 36' (pen.); Gera 46'; Dárdai 49'	Stadium: Bilino Polje Stadium; Attendance: 11,800; Referee: Costas Kapitanis (Cyprus)

7 October UEFA Euro 2008 qualifying	Moldova	2–2	Bosnia and Herzegovina	Chișinău, Moldova
19:00 UTC+3	Rogaciov 13', 32' (pen.)	Report	Misimović 63'; Grlić 68'	Stadium: Zimbru Stadium; Attendance: 7,114; Referee: Hervé Piccirillo (France)

11 October UEFA Euro 2008 qualifying	Bosnia and Herzegovina	0–4	Greece	Zenica, Bosnia and Herzegovina
19:15 UTC+2		Report	Charisteas 8' (pen.); Patsatzoglou 82'; Samaras 85'; Katsouranis 90+4'	Stadium: Bilino Polje Stadium; Attendance: 8,000; Referee: Yuri Baskakov (Russia)

=== 2007 ===
24 March UEFA Euro 2008 qualifying	Norway	1–2	Bosnia and Herzegovina	Oslo, Norway
19:00 UTC+1 (Note: Match delayed by 35 minutes by match referee Mike Riley after flares were thrown from the stands, minutes after the kick-off.)	Carew 50' (pen.)	Report	Misimović 18'; Muslimović 33'	Stadium: Ullevaal Stadion; Attendance: 16,987; Referee: Michael Riley (England)

2 June UEFA Euro 2008 qualifying	Bosnia and Herzegovina	3–2	Turkey	Sarajevo, Bosnia and Herzegovina
20:00 UTC+2	Muslimović 27'; Džeko 45+2'; Čustović 90'	Report	Şükür 13'; Sarıoğlu 39'	Stadium: Asim Ferhatović Hase Stadium; Attendance: 13,800; Referee: Peter Fröjdfeldt (Sweden)

6 June UEFA Euro 2008 qualifying	Bosnia and Herzegovina	1–0	Malta	Sarajevo, Bosnia and Herzegovina
20:15 UTC+2	Muslimović 6'	Report		Stadium: Asim Ferhatović Hase Stadium; Attendance: 10,500; Referee: Ceri Richards (Wales)

22 August Friendly	Bosnia and Herzegovina	3–5	Croatia	Sarajevo, Bosnia and Herzegovina
20:30 UTC+2	Muslimović 40', 70', 77'	Report	Eduardo 18'; Srna 35', 74'; N. Kovač 72', 81'	Stadium: Asim Ferhatović Hase Stadium; Attendance: 20,000; Referee: Damir Skomina (Slovenia)

8 September UEFA Euro 2008 qualifying	Hungary	1–0	Bosnia and Herzegovina	Székesfehérvár, Hungary
16:00 UTC+2	Gera 38' (pen.)	Report		Stadium: Stadion Sóstói; Attendance: 10,877; Referee: Matteo Trefoloni (Italy)

12 September UEFA Euro 2008 qualifying	Bosnia and Herzegovina	0–1	Moldova	Sarajevo, Bosnia and Herzegovina
20:00 UTC+2		Report	Bugaiov 22'	Stadium: Asim Ferhatović Hase Stadium; Attendance: 2,000; Referee: Jouni Hyytiä (Finland)

13 October UEFA Euro 2008 qualifying	Greece	3–2	Bosnia and Herzegovina	Athens, Greece
21:30 UTC+3	Charisteas 10'; Gekas 57'; Liberopoulos 72'	Report	Hrgović 54'; Ibišević 90'	Stadium: Olympic Stadium; Attendance: 30,250; Referee: Grzegorz Gilewski (Poland)

17 October UEFA Euro 2008 qualifying	Bosnia and Herzegovina	0–2	Norway	Sarajevo, Bosnia and Herzegovina
20:30 UTC+2		Report	Hagen 5'; J. A. Riise 74'	Stadium: Asim Ferhatović Hase Stadium; Attendance: 1,500; Referee: Stéphane Lannoy (France)

21 November UEFA Euro 2008 qualifying	Turkey	1–0	Bosnia and Herzegovina	Istanbul, Turkey
21:00 UTC+2	Kahveci 43'	Report		Stadium: Ali Sami Yen Stadium; Attendance: 20,106; Referee: Eric Braamhaar (Netherlands)

15 December Friendly	Bosnia and Herzegovina	0–1	Poland	Antalya, Turkey
18:00 UTC+2		Report	Golański 42'	Stadium: Antalya Atatürk Stadium; Attendance: 50; Referee: Kuddusi Müftüoglu (Turkey)

=== 2008 ===
30 January Friendly	Japan	3–0	Bosnia and Herzegovina	Tokyo, Japan
19:20 UTC+9	Nakazawa 68'; Yamase 83', 88'	Report		Stadium: National Stadium; Attendance: 26,971; Referee: Kim Eui-Soo (South Korea)

26 March Friendly	Bosnia and Herzegovina	2–2	Macedonia	Zenica, Bosnia and Herzegovina
20:15 UTC+1	Damjanović 17', 20'	Report	Maznov 41', 45'	Stadium: Bilino Polje Stadium; Attendance: 11,000; Referee: Vlado Svilokos (Croatia)

1 June Friendly	Bosnia and Herzegovina	1–0	Azerbaijan	Zenica, Bosnia and Herzegovina
20:15 UTC+2	Nikolić 72'	Report		Stadium: Bilino Polje Stadium; Attendance: 800; Referee: Pavle Radovanović (Montenegro)

20 August Friendly	Bosnia and Herzegovina	1–2	Bulgaria	Zenica, Bosnia and Herzegovina
20:15 UTC+2	Ibričić 59'	Report	Berbatov 26', 57'	Stadium: Bilino Polje Stadium; Attendance: 7,000; Referee: Dragomir Stanković (Serbia)

6 September 2010 FIFA World Cup qualification	Spain	1–0	Bosnia and Herzegovina	Murcia, Spain
22:00 UTC+2	Villa 58'	Report		Stadium: Estadio Nueva Condomina; Attendance: 29,152; Referee: Craig Thomson (Scotland)

10 September 2010 FIFA World Cup qualification	Bosnia and Herzegovina	7–0	Estonia	Zenica, Bosnia and Herzegovina
20:15 UTC+2	Misimović 24', 30' (pen.), 56'; Muslimović 59'; Džeko 60', 72'; Ibričić 88'	Report		Stadium: Bilino Polje Stadium; Attendance: 12,500; Referee: Cristian Balaj (Romania)

11 October 2010 FIFA World Cup qualification	Turkey	2–1	Bosnia and Herzegovina	Istanbul, Turkey
21:00 UTC+3	Arda 51'; Mevlüt 66'	Report	Džeko 27'	Stadium: BJK İnönü Stadium; Attendance: 23,628; Referee: Viktor Kassai (Hungary)

15 October 2010 FIFA World Cup qualification	Bosnia and Herzegovina	4–1	Armenia	Zenica, Bosnia and Herzegovina
20:15 UTC+2	Spahić 31'; Džeko 39'; Muslimović 56', 89'	Report	Minasyan 85'	Stadium: Bilino Polje Stadium; Attendance: 13,000; Referee: Asaf Kenan (Israel)

19 November Friendly	Slovenia	3–4	Bosnia and Herzegovina	Maribor, Slovenia
20:15 UTC+1	Koren 27'; Novaković 64' (pen.), 75'	Report	Ibišević 2', 62'; Misimović 11' (pen.); Džeko 53'	Stadium: Ljudski vrt Attendance: 10,000; Referee: Petteri Kari (Finland)

=== 2009 ===
28 March 2010 FIFA World Cup qualification	Belgium	2–4	Bosnia and Herzegovina	Genk, Belgium
20:45 UTC+1	Dembélé 66'; Sonck 90' (pen.)	Report	Džeko 8'; Jahić 74'; Bajramović 81'; Misimović 87'	Stadium: Fenix Stadion; Attendance: 20,041; Referee: Nikolai Ivanov (Russia)

1 April 2010 FIFA World Cup qualification	Bosnia and Herzegovina	2–1	Belgium	Zenica, Bosnia and Herzegovina
20:45 UTC+2	Džeko 12', 15'	Report	Swerts 88'	Stadium: Bilino Polje Stadium; Attendance: 13,800; Referee: Vladimír Hriňák (Slovakia)

1 June Friendly	Uzbekistan	0–0	Bosnia and Herzegovina	Tashkent, Uzbekistan
19:05 UTC+5		Report		Stadium: Pakhtakor Central Stadium; Attendance: 15,000; Referee: Valentin Kovalenko (Uzbekistan)

9 June Friendly	Bosnia and Herzegovina	2–1	Oman	Cannes, France
17:00 UTC+2	Džeko 14'; Salihović 85'	Report	Hadid 30'	Stadium: Stade Pierre de Coubertin; Attendance: 50; Referee: Bruno Cove (France)

12 August Friendly	Bosnia and Herzegovina	2–3	Iran	Sarajevo, Bosnia and Herzegovina
20:45 UTC+2	Džeko 52', 65'	Report	Shojaei 79'; Borhani 86'; Teymourian 90+3'	Stadium: Asim Ferhatović Hase Stadium; Attendance: 20,000; Referee: Draženko Kovač (Croatia)

5 September 2010 FIFA World Cup qualification	Armenia	0–2	Bosnia and Herzegovina	Yerevan, Armenia
20:00 UTC+5		Report	Ibričić 6'; Muslimović 74'	Stadium: Hanrapetakan Stadium; Attendance: 1,800; Referee: Eric Braamhaar (Netherlands)

9 September 2010 FIFA World Cup qualification	Bosnia and Herzegovina	1–1	Turkey	Zenica, Bosnia and Herzegovina
20:00 UTC+5	Salihović 25'	Report	Belözoğlu 4'	Stadium: Bilino Polje Stadium; Attendance: 14,000; Referee: Olegário Benquerença (Portugal)

10 October 2010 FIFA World Cup qualification	Estonia	0–2	Bosnia and Herzegovina	Tallinn, Estonia
19:00 UTC+3		Report	Džeko 30'; Ibišević 64'	Stadium: Lilleküla Stadium; Attendance: 6,450; Referee: Nicola Rizzoli (Italy)

14 October 2010 FIFA World Cup qualification	Bosnia and Herzegovina	2–5	Spain	Zenica, Bosnia and Herzegovina
20:00 UTC+2	Džeko 90'; Misimović 90+2'	Report	Piqué 13'; Silva 14'; Negredo 50', 55'; Mata 81'	Stadium: Bilino Polje Stadium; Attendance: 13,500; Referee: Konrad Plautz (Austria)

14 November 2010 FIFA World Cup qualification play-offs	Portugal	1–0	Bosnia and Herzegovina	Lisbon, Portugal
20:30 UTC±0	Alves 31'	Report		Stadium: Estádio da Luz; Attendance: 60,588; Referee: Martin Atkinson (England)

18 November 2010 FIFA World Cup qualification play-offs	Bosnia and Herzegovina	0–1 (0–2 agg.)	Portugal	Zenica, Bosnia and Herzegovina
20:45 UTC+1		Report	Meireles 56'	Stadium: Bilino Polje Stadium; Attendance: 15,000; Referee: Roberto Rosetti (Italy)

=== 2010 ===
3 March Friendly	Bosnia and Herzegovina	2–1	Ghana	Sarajevo, Bosnia and Herzegovina
17:30 UTC+1	Ibišević 40'; Pjanić 65'	Report	Muntari 22'	Stadium: Asim Ferhatović Hase Stadium; Attendance: 12,000; Referee: Damir Batinić (Croatia)

29 May Friendly	Sweden	4–2	Bosnia and Herzegovina	Solna, Sweden
19:00 UTC+2	Toivonen 44'; M. Olsson 68', 82'; Berg 90+2'	Report	Salihović 47'; Zec 90'	Stadium: Råsunda Stadion; Attendance: 22,589; Referee: Manuel Gräfe (Germany)

3 June Friendly	Germany	3–1	Bosnia and Herzegovina	Frankfurt, Germany
20:30 UTC+2	Lahm 50'; Schweinsteiger 73', 77'	Report	Džeko 15'	Stadium: Commerzbank-Arena; Attendance: 48,000; Referee: Nicola Rizzoli (Italy)

11 August Friendly	Bosnia and Herzegovina	1–1	Qatar	Sarajevo, Bosnia and Herzegovina
19:00 UTC+2	Ibišević 9'	Report	Rizik 58'	Stadium: Stadion Grbavica; Attendance: 18,000; Referee: Domagoj Vučkov (Croatia)

3 September UEFA Euro 2012 qualifying	Luxembourg	0–3	Bosnia and Herzegovina	Luxembourg City, Luxembourg
20:15 UTC+2		Report	Ibričić 6'; Pjanić 12'; Džeko 16'	Stadium: Stade Josy Barthel; Attendance: 7,327; Referee: Veaceslav Banari (Moldova)

7 September UEFA Euro 2012 qualifying	Bosnia and Herzegovina	0–2	France	Sarajevo, Bosnia and Herzegovina
21:00 UTC+2		Report	Benzema 72'; Malouda 78'	Stadium: Asim Ferhatović Hase Stadium; Attendance: 28,000; Referee: Felix Brych (Germany)

8 October UEFA Euro 2012 qualifying	Albania	1–1	Bosnia and Herzegovina	Tirana, Albania
20:30 UTC+2	Duro 45+2'	Report	Ibišević 21'	Stadium: Qemal Stafa; Attendance: 14,220; Referee: Kristinn Jakobsson (Iceland)

17 November Friendly	Slovakia	2–3	Bosnia and Herzegovina	Bratislava, Slovakia
17:00 UTC+1	Šebo 3'; Grajciar 63'	Report	Medunjanin 28'; Pjanić 50'; Džeko 60'	Stadium: Tehelné pole Attendance: 7,822; Referee: Tomasz Mikulski (Poland)

10 December Friendly	Poland	2–2	Bosnia and Herzegovina	Antalya, Turkey
21:30 UTC+2	Brożek 7', 52'	Report	Subašić 23'; Misimović 55' (pen.)	Stadium: Mardan Sports Complex; Attendance: 50; Referee: Mustafa Öğretmenoğlu (Turkey)

=== 2011 ===
9 February Friendly	Mexico	2–0	Bosnia and Herzegovina	Atlanta, United States
21:00 UTC-4	Pjanić 48' (o.g.); Pacheco 54'	Report		Stadium: Georgia Dome; Attendance: 50,507; Referee: Jair Marrufo (United States)

26 March UEFA Euro 2012 qualifying	Bosnia and Herzegovina	2–1	Romania	Zenica, Bosnia and Herzegovina
19:15 UTC+1	Ibišević 63'; Džeko 83'	Report	Marica 29'	Stadium: Bilino Polje Stadium; Attendance: 13,000; Referee: Fernando Teixeira Vitienes (Spain)

3 June UEFA Euro 2012 qualifying	Romania	3–0	Bosnia and Herzegovina	Bucharest, Romania
21:00 UTC+3	Mutu 37'; Marica 41', 55'	Report		Stadium: Stadionul Giulești-Valentin Stănescu; Attendance: 8,200; Referee: Jonas Eriksson (Sweden)

7 June UEFA Euro 2012 qualifying	Bosnia and Herzegovina	2–0	Albania	Zenica, Bosnia and Herzegovina
20:15 UTC+2	Medunjanin 67'; Maletić 90+1'	Report		Stadium: Bilino Polje Stadium; Attendance: 9,000; Referee: Kevin Blom (Netherlands)

10 August Friendly	Bosnia and Herzegovina	0–0	Greece	Sarajevo, Bosnia and Herzegovina
21:00 UTC+2		Report		Stadium: Asim Ferhatović Hase Stadium; Attendance: 12,000; Referee: Nikola Dabanović (Montenegro)

2 September UEFA Euro 2012 qualifying	Belarus	0–2	Bosnia and Herzegovina	Minsk, Belarus
20:30 UTC+3		Report	Salihović 22' (pen.); Medunjanin 24'	Stadium: Dinamo Stadium; Attendance: 28,500; Referee: Viktor Kassai (Hungary)

6 September UEFA Euro 2012 qualifying	Bosnia and Herzegovina	1–0	Belarus	Zenica, Bosnia and Herzegovina
20:15 UTC+2	Misimović 87'	Report		Stadium: Bilino Polje Stadium; Attendance: 12,000; Referee: Martin Atkinson (England)

7 October UEFA Euro 2012 qualifying	Bosnia and Herzegovina	5–0	Luxembourg	Zenica, Bosnia and Herzegovina
20:00 UTC+2	Džeko 12'; Misimović 15', 22' (pen.); Pjanić 36'; Medunjanin 51'	Report		Stadium: Bilino Polje Stadium; Attendance: 12,000; Referee: Simon Lee Evans (Wales)

11 October UEFA Euro 2012 qualifying	France	1–1	Bosnia and Herzegovina	Saint-Denis, France
21:00 UTC+2	Nasri 78' (pen.)	Report	Džeko 40'	Stadium: Stade de France; Attendance: 78,357; Referee: Craig Thomson (Scotland)

11 November UEFA Euro 2012 qualifying play-offs	Bosnia and Herzegovina	0–0	Portugal	Zenica, Bosnia and Herzegovina
20:00 UTC+1		Report		Stadium: Bilino Polje Stadium; Attendance: 12,352; Referee: Howard Webb (England)

15 November UEFA Euro 2012 qualifying play-offs	Portugal	6–2 (6–2 agg.)	Bosnia and Herzegovina	Lisbon, Portugal
20:45 UTC+0	Ronaldo 8', 53'; Nani 24'; Postiga 72', 82'; Veloso 80'	Report	Misimović 41' (pen.); Spahić 65'	Stadium: Estádio da Luz; Attendance: 47,728; Referee: Wolfgang Stark (Germany)

16 December Friendly	Poland	1–0	Bosnia and Herzegovina	Antalya, Turkey
20:30 UTC+2	Sobota 27'	Report		Stadium: Mardan Sports Complex; Attendance: 150; Referee: Yunus Yıldırım (Turkey)

=== 2012 ===
29 February Friendly	Bosnia and Herzegovina	1–2	Brazil	St. Gallen, Switzerland
20:00 UTC+1	Ibišević 13'	Report	Marcelo 4'; Papac 90+1' (o.g.)	Stadium: AFG Arena; Attendance: 17,500; Referee: Sascha Kever (Switzerland)

26 May Friendly	Republic of Ireland	1–0	Bosnia and Herzegovina	Dublin, Ireland
17:00 UTC+1	Long 77'	Report		Stadium: Aviva Stadium; Attendance: 37,100; Referee: Nikolaj Hänni (Switzerland)

31 May Friendly	Mexico	2–1	Bosnia and Herzegovina	Chicago, United States
20:00 UTC-5	G. Dos Santos 6'; Hernández 90+2'	Report	Džeko 29'	Stadium: Soldier Field; Attendance: 51,240; Referee: Edvin Jurisevic (United States)

15 August Friendly	Wales	0–2	Bosnia and Herzegovina	Llanelli, Wales
20:45 CEST		Report	Ibišević 21'; Stevanović 54'	Stadium: Parc y Scarlets; Attendance: 6,253; Referee: Marco Borg (Malta)

7 September 2014 FIFA World Cup qualification	Liechtenstein	1–8	Bosnia and Herzegovina	Vaduz, Liechtenstein
19:00 UTC+2	Christen 61'	Report	Misimović 26', 31'; Ibišević 33', 40', 83'; Džeko 46', 64', 81'	Stadium: Rheinpark Stadion; Attendance: 5,900; Referee: Marco Borg (Malta)

11 September 2014 FIFA World Cup qualification	Bosnia and Herzegovina	4–1	Latvia	Zenica, Bosnia and Herzegovina
20:00 UTC+2	Misimović 12' (pen.), 54'; Pjanić 44'; Džeko 90+2'	Report	Gorkšs 5'	Stadium: Bilino Polje Stadium; Attendance: 11,900; Referee: Deniz Aytekin (Germany)

12 October 2014 FIFA World Cup qualification	Greece	0–0	Bosnia and Herzegovina	Piraeus, Greece
20:45 UTC+3		Report		Stadium: Karaiskakis Stadium; Attendance: 26,211; Referee: Antonio Damato (Italy)

16 October 2014 FIFA World Cup qualification	Bosnia and Herzegovina	3–0	Lithuania	Zenica, Bosnia and Herzegovina
20:00 UTC+2	Ibišević 28'; Džeko 35'; Pjanić 41'	Report		Stadium: Bilino Polje Stadium; Attendance: 11,920; Referee: Miroslav Zelinka (Czech Republic)

14 November Friendly	Algeria	0–1	Bosnia and Herzegovina	Algiers, Algeria
18:00 UTC+1		Report	Svraka 90+3'	Stadium: Stade 5 Juillet 1962; Attendance: 30,000; Referee: Koman Coulibaly (Mali)

=== 2013 ===
6 February Friendly	Slovenia	0–3	Bosnia and Herzegovina	Ljubljana, Slovenia
18:00 UTC+1		Report	Ibišević 34'; Pjanić 41'; Svraka 80'	Stadium: Stožice Stadium; Attendance: 14,000; Referee: Pavel Královec (Czech Republic)

22 March 2014 FIFA World Cup qualification	Bosnia and Herzegovina	3–1	Greece	Zenica, Bosnia and Herzegovina
20:45 UTC+1	Džeko 29', 53'; Ibišević 36'	Report	Gekas 90+3'	Stadium: Bilino Polje Stadium; Attendance: 11,000; Referee: Björn Kuipers (Netherlands)

7 June 2014 FIFA World Cup qualification	Latvia	0–5	Bosnia and Herzegovina	Riga, Latvia
19:30 UTC+3		Report	Lulić 48'; Ibišević 53'; Medunjanin 63'; Pjanić 80'; Džeko 82'	Stadium: Skonto Stadium; Attendance: 7,787; Referee: Mike Dean (England)

14 August Friendly	Bosnia and Herzegovina	3–4	United States	Sarajevo, Bosnia and Herzegovina
20:40 UTC+2	Džeko 8', 90'; Ibišević 30'	Report	Altidore 59', 84', 87'; Johnson 55'	Stadium: Asim Ferhatović Hase Stadium; Attendance: 24,000; Referee: Damir Skomina (Slovenia)

6 September 2014 FIFA World Cup qualification	Bosnia and Herzegovina	0–1	Slovakia	Zenica, Bosnia and Herzegovina
20:15 UTC+2		Report	Pečovský 77'	Stadium: Bilino Polje Stadium; Attendance: 11,620; Referee: Nicola Rizzoli (Italy)

10 September 2014 FIFA World Cup qualification	Slovakia	1–2	Bosnia and Herzegovina	Žilina, Slovakia
20:15 UTC+2	Hamšík 42'	Report	Bičakčić 70'; Hajrović 78'	Stadium: Štadión pod Dubňom; Attendance: 9,438; Referee: David Fernández Borbalán (Spain)

11 October 2014 FIFA World Cup qualification	Bosnia and Herzegovina	4–1	Liechtenstein	Zenica, Bosnia and Herzegovina
20:00 UTC+2	Džeko 27', 39'; Misimović 34'; Ibišević 38'	Report	Hasler 61'	Stadium: Bilino Polje Stadium; Attendance: 14,000; Referee: Richard Liesveld (Netherlands)

15 October 2014 FIFA World Cup qualification	Lithuania	0–1	Bosnia and Herzegovina	Kaunas, Lithuania
20:00 UTC+3		Report	Ibišević 68'	Stadium: Darius and Girėnas Stadium; Attendance: 6,239; Referee: Felix Zwayer (Germany)

18 November Friendly	Argentina	2–0	Bosnia and Herzegovina	St. Louis, United States
19:30 UTC-6	Agüero 40', 66'	Report		Stadium: Busch Stadium; Attendance: 30,397; Referee: Edvin Jurisevic (United States)

=== 2014 ===
5 March Friendly	Bosnia and Herzegovina	0–2	Egypt	Innsbruck, Austria
18:30 UTC+1		Report	Elmohamady 52'; Ghazal 64'	Stadium: Tivoli-Neu; Attendance: 14,000; Referee: Markus Hameter (Austria)

30 May Road to Brazil	Bosnia and Herzegovina	2–1	Ivory Coast	St. Louis, United States
20:30 UTC-5	Džeko 17', 53'	Report	Drogba 90'	Stadium: Edward Jones Dome; Attendance: 14,101; Referee: Jair Marrufo (United States)

3 June Friendly	Mexico	0–1	Bosnia and Herzegovina	Chicago, United States
20:30 UTC-5		Report	Hajrović 41'	Stadium: Soldier Field; Attendance: 51,240; Referee: Óscar Reyna (Guatemala)

15 June 2014 FIFA World Cup Group F	Argentina	2–1	Bosnia and Herzegovina	Rio de Janeiro, Brazil
19:00 UTC-5	Kolašinac 3' (o.g.); Messi 65'	Report	Ibišević 84'	Stadium: Estádio do Maracanã; Attendance: 74,738; Referee: Joel Aguilar (El Salvador)

21 June 2014 FIFA World Cup Group F	Nigeria	1–0	Bosnia and Herzegovina	Cuiabá, Brazil
18:00 UTC−4	Odemwingie 29'	Report		Stadium: Arena Pantanal; Attendance: 40,499; Referee: Peter O'Leary (New Zealand)

25 June 2014 FIFA World Cup Group F	Bosnia and Herzegovina	3–1	Iran	Salvador, Brazil
13:00 UTC−3	Džeko 23'; Pjanić 59'; Vršajević 83'	Report	Ghoochannejhad 82'	Stadium: Arena Fonte Nova; Attendance: 48,011; Referee: Carlos Velasco Carballo (Spain)

4 September Friendly	Bosnia and Herzegovina	3–0	Liechtenstein	Tuzla, Bosnia and Herzegovina
17:00 UTC+2	Ibišević 2', 14'; Džeko 24'	Report		Stadium: Tušanj City Stadium; Attendance: 8,000; Referee: Danilo Grujić (Serbia)

9 September UEFA Euro 2016 qualifying	Bosnia and Herzegovina	1–2	Cyprus	Zenica, Bosnia and Herzegovina
20:45 UTC+2	Ibišević 6'	Report	Christofi 45', 73'	Stadium: Bilino Polje Stadium; Attendance: 12,100; Referee: Yevhen Aranovskiy (Ukraine)

10 October UEFA Euro 2016 qualifying	Wales	0–0	Bosnia and Herzegovina	Cardiff, Wales
20:45 UTC+2		Report		Stadium: Cardiff City Stadium; Attendance: 30,741; Referee: Vladislav Bezborodov (Russia)

13 October UEFA Euro 2016 qualifying	Bosnia and Herzegovina	1–1	Belgium	Zenica, Bosnia and Herzegovina
20:45 UTC+2	Džeko 28'	Report	Nainggolan 51'	Stadium: Bilino Polje Stadium; Attendance: 12,070; Referee: Luca Banti (Italy)

16 November UEFA Euro 2016 qualifying	Israel	3–0	Bosnia and Herzegovina	Haifa, Israel
20:45 UTC+1	Vermouth 36'; Damari 45'; Zahavi 70'	Report		Stadium: Sammy Ofer Stadium; Attendance: 28,300; Referee: Antonio Mateu Lahoz (Spain)

=== 2015 ===
28 March UEFA Euro 2016 qualifying	Andorra	0–3	Bosnia and Herzegovina	Andorra la Vella, Andorra
20:45 UTC+2		Report	Džeko 13', 49', 62'	Stadium: Estadi Nacional; Attendance: 2,498; Referee: István Vad (Hungary)

31 March Friendly	Austria	1–1	Bosnia and Herzegovina	Vienna, Austria
20:30 UTC+2	Janko 34'	Report	Hajrović 48'	Stadium: Ernst Happel Stadium; Attendance: 48,500; Referee: Libor Kovařík (Czech Republic)

12 June UEFA Euro 2016 qualifying	Bosnia and Herzegovina	3–1	Israel	Zenica, Bosnia and Herzegovina
20:45 UTC+2	Višća 42', 75'; Džeko 45+2' (pen.)	Report	Ben Haim II 41'	Stadium: Bilino Polje Stadium; Attendance: 12,100; Referee: Ruddy Buquet (France)

3 September UEFA Euro 2016 qualifying	Belgium	3–1	Bosnia and Herzegovina	Brussels, Belgium
20:45 UTC+2	Fellaini 23'; De Bruyne 44'; Hazard 78' (pen.)	Report	Džeko 15'	Stadium: King Baudouin Stadium; Attendance: 42,975; Referee: Jorge Sousa (Portugal)

6 September UEFA Euro 2016 qualifying	Bosnia and Herzegovina	3–0	Andorra	Zenica, Bosnia and Herzegovina
20:45 UTC+2	Bičakčić 14'; Džeko 30'; Lulić 45'	Report		Stadium: Bilino Polje Stadium; Attendance: 6,830; Referee: Arnold Hunter (Northern Ireland)

10 October UEFA Euro 2016 qualifying	Bosnia and Herzegovina	2–0	Wales	Zenica, Bosnia and Herzegovina
20:45 UTC+2	Đurić 71'; Ibišević 90'	Report		Stadium: Bilino Polje Stadium; Attendance: 10,250; Referee: Alberto Undiano Mallenco (Spain)

13 October UEFA Euro 2016 qualifying	Cyprus	2–3	Bosnia and Herzegovina	Nicosia, Cyprus
21:45 UTC+3	Charalambidis 32'; Mitidis 41'	Report	Medunjanin 13', 44'; Đurić 67'	Stadium: GSP Stadium; Attendance: 17,687; Referee: Anthony Taylor (England)

13 November UEFA Euro 2016 qualifying play-offs	Bosnia and Herzegovina	1–1	Republic of Ireland	Zenica, Bosnia and Herzegovina
20:45 UTC+1	Džeko 85'	Report	Brady 82'	Stadium: Bilino Polje Stadium; Attendance: 12,000; Referee: Felix Brych (Germany)

16 November UEFA Euro 2016 qualifying play-offs	Republic of Ireland	2–0 (3–1 agg.)	Bosnia and Herzegovina	Dublin, Ireland
19:45 UTC±0	Walters 24' (pen.), 70'	Report		Stadium: Aviva Stadium; Attendance: 50,500; Referee: Björn Kuipers (Netherlands)

=== 2016 ===
25 March Friendly	Luxembourg	0–3	Bosnia and Herzegovina	Luxembourg City, Luxembourg
20:15 UTC+1		Report	Chanot 73' (o.g.); Đurić 75'; Pjanić 90+2'	Stadium: Stade Josy Barthel; Attendance: 3,731; Referee: Jonathan Lardot (Belgium)

29 March Friendly	Switzerland	0–2	Bosnia and Herzegovina	Zurich, Switzerland
20:30 UTC+1		Report	Džeko 14'; Pjanić 57'	Stadium: Stadion Letzigrund; Attendance: 17,000; Referee: Sébastien Delferière (Belgium)

29 May Friendly	Spain	3–1	Bosnia and Herzegovina	St. Gallen, Switzerland
18:00 UTC+2	Nolito 11', 18'; Pedro 90+4'	Report	Spahić 29'	Stadium: AFG Arena; Attendance: 10,000; Referee: Stephan Klossner (Austria)

3 June Kirin Cup Semi-final	Bosnia and Herzegovina	2–2 (4–3 p)	Denmark	Aichi, Japan
16:00 UTC+9	Đurić 52', 84'	Report	Kjær 22'; Fischer 41'	Stadium: Toyota Stadium; Attendance: 14,001; Referee: Benjamin Williams (Australia)
	Penalties
	Vrančić (penalty missed); Krunić (penalty scored); Hodžić (penalty scored); Stevanović (penalty scored); Medunjanin (penalty scored)		(penalty scored) Rasmussen; (penalty missed) Vestergaard; (penalty missed) Christensen; (penalty scored) Schöne; (penalty scored) Eriksen

7 June Kirin Cup Final	Japan	1–2	Bosnia and Herzegovina	Osaka, Japan
19:30 UTC+9	Kiyotake 28'	Report	Đurić 29', 66'	Stadium: Suita City Football Stadium; Attendance: 35,589; Referee: Jarred Gillett (Australia)

6 September 2018 FIFA World Cup qualification	Bosnia and Herzegovina	5–0	Estonia	Zenica, Bosnia and Herzegovina
20:45 UTC+1	Spahić 7', 90+2'; Džeko 23' (pen.); Medunjanin 71'; Ibišević 83'	Report (FIFA); Report (UEFA)		Stadium: Bilino Polje Stadium; Attendance: 8,820; Referee: Miroslav Zelinka (Czech Republic)

7 October 2018 FIFA World Cup qualification	Belgium	4–0	Bosnia and Herzegovina	Brussels, Belgium
20:45 UTC+1	Spahić 26' (o.g.); Hazard 29'; Alderweireld 60'; R. Lukaku 79'	Report (FIFA); Report (UEFA)		Stadium: King Baudouin Stadium; Attendance: 42,653; Referee: Martin Atkinson (England)

10 October 2018 FIFA World Cup qualification	Bosnia and Herzegovina	2–0	Cyprus	Zenica, Bosnia and Herzegovina
20:45 UTC+1	Džeko 70', 81'	Report (FIFA); Report (UEFA)		Stadium: Bilino Polje Stadium; Attendance: 8,900; Referee: Xavier Estrada Fernández (Spain)

13 November 2018 FIFA World Cup qualification	Greece	1–1	Bosnia and Herzegovina	Piraeus, Greece
20:45 UTC+1	Tzavellas 90+5'	Report (FIFA); Report (UEFA)	Karnezis 32' (o.g.)	Stadium: Karaiskakis Stadium; Attendance: 20,075; Referee: Jonas Eriksson (Sweden)

=== 2017 ===
25 March 2018 FIFA World Cup qualification	Bosnia and Herzegovina	5–0	Gibraltar	Zenica, Bosnia and Herzegovina
18:00 UTC+1	Ibišević 4', 43'; Vršajević 52'; Višća 56'; Bičakčić 90+4'	Report (FIFA); Report (UEFA)		Stadium: Bilino Polje Stadium; Attendance: 8,285; Referee: Svein-Erik Edvartsen (Norway)

28 March Friendly	Albania	1–2	Bosnia and Herzegovina	Elbasan, Albania
18:00 UTC+1	Balaj 68'	Report	Džeko 7' (pen.); Lulić 42'	Stadium: Elbasan Arena; Attendance: 4,550; Referee: Dimitar Meckaroski (Macedonia)

9 June 2018 FIFA World Cup qualification	Bosnia and Herzegovina	0–0	Greece	Zenica, Bosnia and Herzegovina
20:45 UTC+1		Report (FIFA); Report (UEFA)		Stadium: Bilino Polje Stadium; Attendance: 11,000; Referee: Nicola Rizzoli (Italy)

31 August 2018 FIFA World Cup qualification	Cyprus	3–2	Bosnia and Herzegovina	Nicosia, Cyprus
20:45 UTC+1	Christofi 65'; Laban 67'; Sotiriou 76'	Report (FIFA); Report (UEFA)	Šunjić 33'; Višća 44'	Stadium: GSP Stadium; Attendance: 4,143; Referee: Andre Marriner (England)

3 September 2018 FIFA World Cup qualification	Gibraltar	0–4	Bosnia and Herzegovina	Faro/Loulé, Portugal
20:45 UTC+1		Report (FIFA); Report (UEFA)	Džeko 35', 85'; Kodro 66'; Lulić 84'	Stadium: Estádio Algarve; Attendance: 805; Referee: Þorvaldur Árnason (Iceland)

7 October 2018 FIFA World Cup qualification	Bosnia and Herzegovina	3–4	Belgium	Sarajevo, Bosnia and Herzegovina
18:00 UTC+1	Medunjanin 30'; Višća 39'; Đumić 82'	Report (FIFA); Report (UEFA)	Meunier 4'; Batshuayi 59'; Vertonghen 68'; Carrasco 84'	Stadium: Stadion Grbavica; Attendance: 9,657; Referee: William Collum (Scotland)

10 October 2018 FIFA World Cup qualification	Estonia	1–2	Bosnia and Herzegovina	Tallinn, Estonia
20:45 UTC+1	Antonov 75'	Report (FIFA); Report (UEFA)	Hajrović 48', 84'	Stadium: A. Le Coq Arena; Attendance: 4,967; Referee: Vladislav Bezborodov (Russia)

=== 2018 ===
28 January Friendly	United States	0–0	Bosnia and Herzegovina	Carson, United States
18:00 UTC−8		Report		Stadium: StubHub Center; Attendance: 11,161; Referee: Hector Martinez (Honduras)

31 January Friendly	Mexico	1–0	Bosnia and Herzegovina	San Antonio, United States
20:30 UTC−6	Ayala 65'	Report		Stadium: Alamodome; Attendance: 26,867; Referee: Armando Villarreal (United States)

23 March Friendly	Bulgaria	0–1	Bosnia and Herzegovina	Razgrad, Bulgaria
18:00 UTC+1		Report	Kodro 20'	Stadium: Ludogorets Arena; Attendance: 2,200; Referee: François Letexier (France)

27 March Friendly	Senegal	0–0	Bosnia and Herzegovina	Le Havre, France
20:00 UTC+1		Report		Stadium: Stade Océane; Attendance: 2,851; Referee: Stephan Klossner (Switzerland)

28 May Friendly	Bosnia and Herzegovina	0–0	Montenegro	Zenica, Bosnia and Herzegovina
18:00 UTC+2		Report		Stadium: Bilino Polje Stadium; Attendance: 5,215; Referee: Dimitar Mečkarovski (Macedonia)

1 June Friendly	South Korea	1–3	Bosnia and Herzegovina	Jeonju, South Korea
20:00 UTC+9	Lee Jae-sung 30'	Report	Višća 28', 45+1', 79'	Stadium: Jeonju World Cup Stadium; Attendance: 41,254; Referee: Peter Green (Australia)

8 September UEFA Nations League	Northern Ireland	1–2	Bosnia and Herzegovina	Belfast, Northern Ireland
15:00 (14:00 UTC+1)	Grigg 90+3'	Report	Duljević 36'; Sarić 64'	Stadium: Windsor Park; Attendance: 16,942; Referee: Pavel Královec (Czech Republic)

11 September UEFA Nations League	Bosnia and Herzegovina	1–0	Austria	Zenica, Bosnia and Herzegovina
20:45 (20:45 UTC+2)	Džeko 78'	Report		Stadium: Bilino Polje Stadium; Attendance: 9,100; Referee: Ruddy Buquet (France)

11 October Friendly	Turkey	0–0	Bosnia and Herzegovina	Rize, Turkey
20:30 UTC+3		Report		Stadium: Yeni Rize Şehir Stadium; Attendance: 15,196; Referee: Sergei Karasev (Russia)

15 October UEFA Nations League	Bosnia and Herzegovina	2–0	Northern Ireland	Sarajevo, Bosnia and Herzegovina
20:45 (20:45 UTC+2)	Džeko 27', 73'	Report		Stadium: Stadion Grbavica; Attendance: 11,050; Referee: Mattias Gestranius (Finland)

15 November UEFA Nations League	Austria	0–0	Bosnia and Herzegovina	Vienna, Austria
20:45 (20:45 UTC+1)		Report		Stadium: Ernst-Happel-Stadion; Attendance: 37,200; Referee: Andrew Dallas (Scotland)

18 November Friendly	Spain	1–0	Bosnia and Herzegovina	Las Palmas, Spain
19:45 UTC±0	Méndez 78'	Report		Stadium: Estadio Gran Canaria; Attendance: 17,798; Referee: Carlos Xistra (Portugal)

=== 2019 ===
23 March UEFA Euro 2020 qualifying	Bosnia and Herzegovina	2–1	Armenia	Sarajevo, Bosnia and Herzegovina
20:45 UTC+1	Krunić 33'; Milošević 80'	Report	Mkhitaryan 90+3' (pen.)	Stadium: Stadion Grbavica; Attendance: 10,000; Referee: Jakob Kehlet (Denmark)

26 March UEFA Euro 2020 qualifying	Bosnia and Herzegovina	2–2	Greece	Zenica, Bosnia and Herzegovina
20:45 UTC+1	Višća 10'; Pjanić 15'	Report	Fortounis 64' (pen.); Kolovos 85'	Stadium: Bilino Polje Stadium; Attendance: 10,500; Referee: Danny Makkelie (Netherlands)

8 June UEFA Euro 2020 qualifying	Finland	2–0	Bosnia and Herzegovina	Tampere, Finland
18:00 UTC+2	Pukki 56', 68'	Report		Stadium: Tampere Stadium; Attendance: 16,103; Referee: Daniel Stefanski (Poland)

11 June UEFA Euro 2020 qualifying	Italy	2–1	Bosnia and Herzegovina	Turin, Italy
20:45 UTC+2	Insigne 49'; Verratti 86'	Report	Džeko 32'	Stadium: Juventus Stadium; Attendance: 29,100; Referee: Xavier Estrada Fernández (Spain)

5 September UEFA Euro 2020 qualifying	Bosnia and Herzegovina	5–0	Liechtenstein	Zenica, Bosnia and Herzegovina
20:45 UTC+1	Gojak 11', 89'; Malin 80' (o.g.); Džeko 85'; Višća 88'	Report		Stadium: Bilino Polje Stadium; Attendance: 3,825; Referee: Glenn Nyberg (Sweden)

8 September UEFA Euro 2020 qualifying	Armenia	4–2	Bosnia and Herzegovina	Yerevan, Armenia
17:00 UTC+4	Mkhitaryan 3', 66'; Hambardzumyan 77'; Lončar 90+5' (o.g.)	Report	Džeko 13'; Gojak 70'	Stadium: Vazgen Sargsyan Republican Stadium; Attendance: 12,457; Referee: Benoît Bastien (France)

12 October UEFA Euro 2020 qualifying	Bosnia and Herzegovina	4–1	Finland	Zenica, Bosnia and Herzegovina
18:00 UTC+1	Hajrović 29'; Pjanić 37' (pen.), 58'; Hodžić 73'	Report	Pohjanpalo 79'	Stadium: Bilino Polje Stadium; Attendance: 8,193; Referee: Ivan Kružliak (Slovakia)

15 October UEFA Euro 2020 qualifying	Greece	2–1	Bosnia and Herzegovina	Athens, Greece
20:45 UTC+1	Pavlidis 30'; Kovačević 88' (o.g.)	Report	Gojak 35'	Stadium: Olympic Stadium; Attendance: 6,450; Referee: Felix Zwayer (Germany)

15 November UEFA Euro 2020 qualifying	Bosnia and Herzegovina	0–3	Italy	Zenica, Bosnia and Herzegovina
18:00 UTC+1		Report	Acerbi 21'; Insigne 37'; Belotti 53'	Stadium: Bilino Polje Stadium; Attendance: 8,355; Referee: Sandro Schärer (Switzerland)

18 November UEFA Euro 2020 qualifying	Liechtenstein	0–3	Bosnia and Herzegovina	Vaduz, Liechtenstein
20:45 UTC+1		Report	Ćivić 57'; Hodžić 64', 72'	Stadium: Rheinpark Stadion; Attendance: 2,993; Referee: Halis Özkahya (Turkey)

== See also ==
- Bosnia and Herzegovina national football team statistics
- List of international goals scored by Edin Džeko
- The Bosnian footballer of the year award – Idol of the nation
