= 1997 Dunhill Cup Malaysia =

Tournament details
- Host country: Malaysia
- Dates: 21 February – 2 March
- Teams: 8
- Venue: 1 (in 1 host city)

Final positions
- Champions: China (1st title)
- Runners-up: Bosnia and Herzegovina

Tournament statistics
- Matches played: 15
- Goals scored: 38 (2.53 per match)
- Top scorer(s): (China) Fan Zhiyi (Zimbabwe) Gilbert Mushangazhike (Bosnia and Herzegovina) Asim Hrnjić (3 goals)

The 1997 Dunhill Cup Malaysia was a friendly international football tournament held in Malaysia in 1997. It was won by China.

== Groups ==
=== Group A ===
Teams qualified for next phase

Team	Pld	W	D	L	GF	GA	GD	Pts
China	3	3	0	0	7	2	+5	9
Malaysia	3	1	1	1	2	3	–1	4
Finland	3	1	0	2	3	4	–1	3
Singapore	3	0	1	2	1	4	−3	1

21 February 1997

Malaysia	2–1	Finland
K. Sanbagamaran 6', 75'	Report	Tervonen 55'

Merdeka Stadium, Kuala Lumpur

21 February 1997
18:30 UTC+8

China	3–1	Singapore
Fan Zhiyi 6' (pen.); Li Jinyu 59'; Su Maozhen 82'	Report	Nazri Nasir 73'

Merdeka Stadium, Kuala Lumpur
Attendance: 15,000
Referee: Selearajan Subramaniam (Malaysia)

23 February 1997

China	2–1	Finland
Li Ming 16'; Hao Haidong 55'	Report	Sun Jihai 53' (o.g.)

Merdeka Stadium, Kuala Lumpur
Attendance: 15,000
Referee: Pirom Un-prasert (Thailand)

23 February 1997
21:00 UTC+8

Malaysia	0–0	Singapore
	Report

Merdeka Stadium, Kuala Lumpur

25 February 1997

Finland	1–0	Singapore
Puhakainen 6'	Report

Merdeka Stadium, Kuala Lumpur

25 February 1997

China	2–0	Malaysia
Su Maozhen 60'; Sui Dongliang 72'	Report

Merdeka Stadium, Kuala Lumpur
Attendance: 18,000
Referee: Pirom Un-prasert (Thailand)

=== Group B ===
Teams qualified for next phase

Team	Pld	W	D	L	GF	GA	GD	Pts
Bosnia and Herzegovina	3	2	1	0	8	2	+6	7
Zimbabwe	3	1	2	0	8	2	+6	5
Indonesia	3	1	1	1	1	2	–1	4
Vietnam	3	0	0	3	0	11	−11	0

22 February 1997

Indonesia	0–0	Zimbabwe
	Report

Kuala Lumpur

22 February 1997

Vietnam	0–4	Bosnia and Herzegovina
		Muharemović 29'; Pintul 45' (pen.); Smječanin 52' (pen.); Repuh 87'

Kuala Lumpur
Attendance: 18,000
Referee: Nik Ahmad Haji Yaakub (Malaysia)

24 February 1997

Zimbabwe	2–2	Bosnia and Herzegovina
Dinyero 24'; Gorowa 75'		Hrnjić 58'; Muharemović 67'

Kuala Lumpur
Attendance: 15,000
Referee: Selearajin Subramaniam (Malaysia)

24 February 1997

Indonesia	1–0	Vietnam
Widodo Putro 3'	Report

Merdeka Stadium, Kuala Lumpur

26 February 1997

Zimbabwe	6–0	Vietnam
Mushangazhike 5', 8', 55'; Bunjira 7' (83); Zviripayi 70'	Report

Kuala Lumpur

26 February 1997

Indonesia	0–2	Bosnia and Herzegovina
		Pintul 30' (pen.); Hrnjić 44'

Kuala Lumpur
Attendance: 20,000
Referee: Nik Ahmad Yaakub (Malaysia)

== Knockout stage ==
Semi-finals
28 February – Kuala Lumpur
China	3
Zimbabwe	1
28 February – Kuala Lumpur
Malaysia	0
Bosnia and Herzegovina	1

Final
2 March – Kuala Lumpur
China	3
Bosnia and Herzegovina	0

=== Semifinals ===
28 February 1997

China	3–1	Zimbabwe
Fan Zhiyi 22', 58'; Li Ming 29'	Report	Nkathazo 88'

Merdeka Stadium, Kuala Lumpur
Attendance: 5,000
Referee: Nik Ahmad Yaakub (Malaysia)

28 February 1997

Malaysia	0–1	Bosnia and Herzegovina
		Hrnjić 36'

Merdeka Stadium, Kuala Lumpur
Attendance: 40,000
Referee: Kim Young-yoo (South Korea)

=== Finals ===
2 March 1997

China	3–0	Bosnia and Herzegovina
Li Jinyu 54'; Zhang Xiaorui 59'; Hao Haidong 81'

Merdeka Stadium, Kuala Lumpur
Attendance: 15,000
Referee: Hazri Abdullah (Malaysia)

== Award ==
1997 Dunhill Cup Malaysia winner

China
1st title
