= Gilbert Mushangazhike =

Zimbabwean footballer (born 1975)

Personal information
- Full name: Gilbert Mushangazhike
- Date of birth: 11 August 1975 (age 51)
- Place of birth: Salisbury, Rhodesia (now Harare, Zimbabwe)
- Height: 1.72 m (5 ft 7 1/2 in)
- Position: Striker

Team information
- Current team: Black Rhinos F.C.
- Number: 28

Youth career
- 1991–1992: Fire Batteries

Senior career*
Years	Team	Apps	(Gls)
1993–1995	Fire Batteries	12	(10)
1996–1997	Kickers Emden	0	(0)
1997–2003	Manning Rangers	138	(63)
2003	→ Jiangsu Sainty (loan)	25	(13)
2004–2006	Jiangsu Sainty	86	(27)
2007–2009	Orlando Pirates	27	(7)
2009–2010	→ Mpumalanga Black Aces (loan)	11	(0)
2010	Orlando Pirates	0	(0)
2010–2012	Manzini Sundowns	0	(0)
2012–2013	Power Masters		
2013–2014	Black Rhinos		

International career
1997–2008	Zimbabwe	26	(8)
- * Club domestic league appearances and goals as of 4:20, 5 April 2010 (UTC)

Gilbert Mushangazhike (born 11 August 1975 in Harare) is a Zimbabwean footballer. The association football striker recently played in Swaziland by Manzini Sundowns, in China by Jiangsu Sainty, for Germany-based Kickers Emden and in South Africa for Manning Rangers F.C., Orlando Pirates and Mpumalanga Black Aces.

== International career ==
He was a member of the Zimbabwean 2006 African Nations Cup team, who finished bottom of their group in the first round of competition, thus failing to secure qualification for the quarter-finals

=== Teams managed ===
In 2019, he was appointed as coach of Golden Eagles FC, a third-tier team in Zimbabwe.

== Career statistics ==
=== International ===
Appearances and goals by national team and year
National team	Year	Apps	Goals
Zimbabwe	1997	5	4
Zimbabwe	1998	–	
Zimbabwe	1999	6	0
Zimbabwe	2000	–	
Zimbabwe	2001	1	0
Zimbabwe	2002	–	
Zimbabwe	2003	–	
Zimbabwe	2004	–	
Zimbabwe	2005	1	0
Zimbabwe	2006	4	1
Zimbabwe	2007	1	0
Zimbabwe	2008	8	3
Total		26	8

Scores and results list Zimbabwe's goal tally first, score column indicates score after each Mushangazhike goal.

List of international goals scored by Gilbert Mushangazhike
No.	Date	Venue	Opponent	Score	Result	Competition
1	26 February 1997	Stadium Merdeka, Kuala Lumpur, Malaysia	Vietnam	1–0	6–0	1997 Dunhill Cup Malaysia
2	26 February 1997	Stadium Merdeka, Kuala Lumpur, Malaysia	Vietnam	3–0	6–0	1997 Dunhill Cup Malaysia
3	26 February 1997	Stadium Merdeka, Kuala Lumpur, Malaysia	Vietnam	4–0	6–0	1997 Dunhill Cup Malaysia
4	16 March 1997	Independence Stadium, Windhoek, Namibia	Namibia	1–1	1–2 (a.e.t.)	1997 COSAFA Cup
5	15 November 2006	Rufaro Stadium, Harare, Zimbabwe	Namibia	2–0	3–2	Friendly
6	11 March 2008	Germiston Stadium, Germiston, South Africa	South Africa	1–0	1–2	Friendly
7	8 June 2008	Rufaro Stadium, Harare, Zimbabwe	Namibia	1–0	2–0	2010 FIFA World Cup qualification
8	8 June 2008	Rufaro Stadium, Harare, Zimbabwe	Namibia	2–0	2–0	2010 FIFA World Cup qualification
