= Almin Kulenović =

Bosnian footballer

Personal information
- Full name: Almin Kulenović
- Date of birth: 15 November 1973 (age 52)
- Place of birth: Bihać, SFR Yugoslavia
- Height: 1.90 m (6 ft 3 in)
- Position: Defender

Senior career*
Years	Team	Apps	(Gls)
1994-1995	Špansko		
1995-1997	Napredak Velika Mlaka		
1997-1998	Posavina		
1998-1999	Slaven Belupo	10	(0)
1999-2002	Jedinstvo Bihać	87	(8)
2002	Sibenik	9	(0)
2003-2004	Croatia Sesvete	17	(2)
2004-2005	Međimurje	6	(0)
2005-2009	Maksimir	98	(23)
2009-2013	Špansko	58+	(8+)

International career^{‡}
2001	Bosnia and Herzegovina	4	(1)
2001	Bosnia and Herzegovina XI	3	(1)
- * Club domestic league appearances and goals ‡ National team caps and goals as of 19 June 2021

Almin Kulenović (born 15 November 1973) is a Bosnian retired football player. He works as a youth coach for Croatian lower league side Špansko.

== Club career ==
He debuted in Croatia's top tier for Slaven Belupo in the 1998/99 season. He made his debut for Maksimir in September 2005 against Tekstilac Ravnice.

== International career ==
Kulenović made 7 appearances for Bosnia and Herzegovina, the first five of them at the June 2001 Merdeka Tournament: an unofficial match against Slovakia there marked his international debut. His final international was an August 2001 LG Cup match against South Africa.

=== International goal ===
Scores and results list Bosnia and Herzegovina's goal tally first.

No.	Date	Venue	Opponent	Score	Result	Competition
1.	23 June 2001	Stadium Merdeka, Kuala Lumpur, Malaysia	Bahrain	1–0	1–0	Merdeka Tournament

== Personal life ==
His son, Sandro, plays for Dinamo Zagreb and the Croatia national under-21 football team. He is a Bosniak of Croat Muslim origin and is religiously muslim.
