= Velimir Brašnić =

Bosnian footballer

Personal information
- Full name: Velimir Brašnić
- Date of birth: 6 May 1977 (age 49)
- Place of birth: , SFR Yugoslavia
- Height: 1.75 m (5 ft 9 in)
- Position: Striker

Senior career*
| Years | Team | Apps | (Gls) |
| 1997–1998 | Brotnjo | | (11) |
| 1998-1999 | Orašje | | (8) |
| 1999–2000 | Brotnjo | | (11) |
| 2000–2002 | Orašje | 55 | (28) |
| 2002–2003 | Zadar | 22 | (5) |
| 2003–2009 | Orašje | 60 | (31) |

International career^{‡}
| 2001 | Bosnia and Herzegovina | 3 | (1) |
| 2001 | Bosnia and Herzegovina XI | 2 | (0) |
- * Club domestic league appearances and goals ‡ National team caps and goals as of 12 June 2021

Velimir Brašnić (born 6 May 1977) is a Bosnian retired football player.

== Club career ==
He has primarily played for Brotnjo Čitluk and Orašje.

== International career ==
Brašnić made his debut for Bosnia and Herzegovina in a June 2001 Merdeka Tournament match against Slovakia and has earned a total of 5 caps (2 unofficial), scoring 1 goal. His final international was a July 2011 friendly match against Iran.
