= UEFA Euro 2020 qualifying Group J =

Football tournament qualifying stage

Group J of UEFA Euro 2020 qualifying was one of the ten groups to decide which teams would qualify for the UEFA Euro 2020 finals tournament. Group J consisted of six teams: Armenia, Bosnia and Herzegovina, Finland, Greece, Italy and Liechtenstein, where they played against each other home-and-away in a round-robin format.

The top two teams, Italy and Finland, qualified directly for the finals. Unlike previous editions, the participants of the play-offs were not decided based on results from the qualifying group stage, but instead based on their performance in the 2018–19 UEFA Nations League.

Italy won all ten of their matches, becoming only the sixth national side to qualify for a European Championship with a 100% record, and the seventh instance, after France (1992 and 2004), Czech Republic (2000), Germany, Spain (both 2012) and England (2016).

== Standings ==
Pos	Team	Pld	W	D	L	GF	GA	GD	Pts	Qualification	(Italy)	(Finland)	(Greece)	(Bosnia and Herzegovina)	(Armenia)	(Liechtenstein)
1	Italy	10	10	0	0	37	4	+33	30	Qualify for final tournament	—	2–0	2–0	2–1	9–1	6–0
2	Finland	10	6	0	4	16	10	+6	18	Qualify for final tournament	1–2	—	1–0	2–0	3–0	3–0
3	Greece	10	4	2	4	12	14	−2	14		0–3	2–1	—	2–1	2–3	1–1
4	Bosnia and Herzegovina	10	4	1	5	20	17	+3	13	Advance to play-offs via Nations League	0–3	4–1	2–2	—	2–1	5–0
5	Armenia	10	3	1	6	14	25	−11	10		1–3	0–2	0–1	4–2	—	3–0
6	Liechtenstein	10	0	2	8	2	31	−29	2		0–5	0–2	0–2	0–3	1–1	—

Source: UEFA
Rules for classification: Qualification tiebreakers

== Matches ==
The fixtures were released by UEFA the same day as the draw, which was held on 2 December 2018 in Dublin. Times are CET/CEST, (Note: CET (UTC+1) for matches in March and November 2019, and CEST (UTC+2) for all other matches.) as listed by UEFA (local times, if different, are in parentheses).

23 March 2019
20:45

Bosnia and Herzegovina	2–1	Armenia
Krunić 33'; Milošević 80'	Report	Mkhitaryan 90+3' (pen.)

Stadion Grbavica, Sarajevo
Attendance: 10,000
Referee: Jakob Kehlet (Denmark)
23 March 2019
20:45

Italy	2–0	Finland
Barella 7'; Kean 74'	Report

Stadio Friuli, Udine
Attendance: 24,000
Referee: Orel Grinfeld (Israel)
23 March 2019
20:45

Liechtenstein	0–2	Greece
	Report	Fortounis 45+1'; Donis 80'

Rheinpark Stadion, Vaduz
Attendance: 2,711
Referee: Alexandre Boucaut (Belgium)

26 March 2019
18:00 (21:00 UTC+4)

Armenia	0–2	Finland
	Report	Jensen 14'; Soiri 78'

Vazgen Sargsyan Republican Stadium, Yerevan
Attendance: 12,900
Referee: Nikola Dabanović (Montenegro)
26 March 2019
20:45

Bosnia and Herzegovina	2–2	Greece
Višća 10'; Pjanić 15'	Report	Fortounis 64' (pen.); Kolovos 85'

Bilino Polje Stadium, Zenica
Attendance: 10,500
Referee: Danny Makkelie (Netherlands)
26 March 2019
20:45

Italy	6–0	Liechtenstein
Sensi 17'; Verratti 32'; Quagliarella 35' (pen.), 45+3' (pen.); Kean 69'; Pavoletti 76'	Report

Stadio Ennio Tardini, Parma
Attendance: 19,834
Referee: Kirill Levnikov (Russia)

8 June 2019
18:00 (20:00 UTC+4)

Armenia	3–0	Liechtenstein
Ghazaryan 2'; Karapetian 18'; Barseghyan 90+1'	Report

Vazgen Sargsyan Republican Stadium, Yerevan
Attendance: 9,200
Referee: Nikola Popov (Bulgaria)
8 June 2019
18:00 (19:00 UTC+3)

Finland	2–0	Bosnia and Herzegovina
Pukki 56', 68'	Report

Tampere Stadium, Tampere
Attendance: 16,103
Referee: Daniel Stefański (Poland)
8 June 2019
20:45 (21:45 UTC+3)

Greece	0–3	Italy
	Report	Barella 23'; Insigne 30'; Bonucci 33'

Olympic Stadium, Athens
Attendance: 19,828
Referee: Anthony Taylor (England)

11 June 2019
20:45 (21:45 UTC+3)

Greece	2–3	Armenia
Zeca 54'; Fortounis 87'	Report	Karapetian 8'; Ghazaryan 33'; Barseghyan 74'

Olympic Stadium, Athens
Attendance: 7,011
Referee: Kristo Tohver (Estonia)
11 June 2019
20:45

Italy	2–1	Bosnia and Herzegovina
Insigne 49'; Verratti 86'	Report	Džeko 32'

Juventus Stadium, Turin
Attendance: 29,100
Referee: Xavier Estrada Fernández (Spain)
11 June 2019
20:45

Liechtenstein	0–2	Finland
	Report	Pukki 37'; Källman 57'

Rheinpark Stadion, Vaduz
Attendance: 2,160
Referee: Jens Maae (Denmark)

5 September 2019
18:00 (20:00 UTC+4)

Armenia	1–3	Italy
Karapetian 11'	Report	Belotti 28'; Lo. Pellegrini 77'; Ayrapetyan 80' (o.g.)

Vazgen Sargsyan Republican Stadium, Yerevan
Attendance: 13,680
Referee: Daniel Siebert (Germany)
5 September 2019
20:45

Bosnia and Herzegovina	5–0	Liechtenstein
Gojak 11', 89'; Malin 80' (o.g.); Džeko 85'; Višća 87'	Report

Bilino Polje Stadium, Zenica
Attendance: 3,825
Referee: Glenn Nyberg (Sweden)
5 September 2019
20:45 (21:45 UTC+3)

Finland	1–0	Greece
Pukki 52' (pen.)	Report

Tampere Stadium, Tampere
Attendance: 16,163
Referee: Juan Martínez Munuera (Spain)

8 September 2019
15:00 (17:00 UTC+4)

Armenia	4–2	Bosnia and Herzegovina
Mkhitaryan 3', 66'; Hambardzumyan 77'; Lončar 90+5' (o.g.)	Report	Džeko 13'; Gojak 70'

Vazgen Sargsyan Republican Stadium, Yerevan
Attendance: 12,457
Referee: Benoît Bastien (France)
8 September 2019
20:45 (21:45 UTC+3)

Finland	1–2	Italy
Pukki 72' (pen.)	Report	Immobile 59'; Jorginho 79' (pen.)

Tampere Stadium, Tampere
Attendance: 16,292
Referee: Bobby Madden (Scotland)
8 September 2019
20:45 (21:45 UTC+3)

Greece	1–1	Liechtenstein
Masouras 33'	Report	Salanović 85'

Olympic Stadium, Athens
Attendance: 3,445
Referee: Alexander Harkam (Austria)

12 October 2019
18:00

Bosnia and Herzegovina	4–1	Finland
Hajrović 29'; Pjanić 37' (pen.), 58'; Hodžić 73'	Report	Pohjanpalo 79'

Bilino Polje Stadium, Zenica
Attendance: 8,193
Referee: Ivan Kružliak (Slovakia)
12 October 2019
20:45

Italy	2–0	Greece
Jorginho 63' (pen.); Bernardeschi 78'	Report

Stadio Olimpico, Rome
Attendance: 56,274
Referee: Sergei Karasev (Russia)
12 October 2019
20:45

Liechtenstein	1–1	Armenia
Y. Frick 72'	Report	Barseghyan 19'

Rheinpark Stadion, Vaduz
Attendance: 2,285
Referee: István Kovács (Romania)

15 October 2019
18:00 (19:00 UTC+3)

Finland	3–0	Armenia
Jensen 31'; Pukki 61', 88'	Report

Veritas Stadion, Turku
Attendance: 7,231
Referee: Jesús Gil Manzano (Spain)
15 October 2019
20:45 (21:45 UTC+3)

Greece	2–1	Bosnia and Herzegovina
Pavlidis 30'; Kovačević 88' (o.g.)	Report	Gojak 35'

Olympic Stadium, Athens
Attendance: 4,512
Referee: Felix Zwayer (Germany)
15 October 2019
20:45

Liechtenstein	0–5	Italy
	Report	Bernardeschi 2'; Belotti 70', 90+2'; Romagnoli 77'; El Shaarawy 82'

Rheinpark Stadion, Vaduz
Attendance: 5,087
Referee: Andris Treimanis (Latvia)

15 November 2019
18:00 (21:00 UTC+4)

Armenia	0–1	Greece
	Report	Limnios 35'

Vazgen Sargsyan Republican Stadium, Yerevan
Attendance: 6,450
Referee: Paweł Raczkowski (Poland)
15 November 2019
18:00 (19:00 UTC+2)

Finland	3–0	Liechtenstein
Tuominen 21'; Pukki 64' (pen.), 75'	Report

Telia 5G -areena, Helsinki
Attendance: 9,804
Referee: Benoît Bastien (France)
15 November 2019
20:45

Bosnia and Herzegovina	0–3	Italy
	Report	Acerbi 21'; Insigne 37'; Belotti 52'

Bilino Polje Stadium, Zenica
Attendance: 8,355
Referee: Sandro Schärer (Switzerland)

18 November 2019
20:45 (21:45 UTC+2)

Greece	2–1	Finland
Mantalos 47'; Galanopoulos 70'	Report	Pukki 27'

Olympic Stadium, Athens
Attendance: 5,453
Referee: Aleksei Eskov (Russia)
18 November 2019
20:45

Italy	9–1	Armenia
Immobile 8', 33'; Zaniolo 9', 64'; Barella 29'; Romagnoli 72'; Jorginho 75' (pen.); Orsolini 78'; Chiesa 81'	Report	Babayan 79'

Stadio Renzo Barbera, Palermo
Attendance: 27,752
Referee: Tiago Martins (Portugal)
18 November 2019
20:45

Liechtenstein	0–3	Bosnia and Herzegovina
	Report	Ćivić 57'; Hodžić 64', 72'

Rheinpark Stadion, Vaduz
Attendance: 2,993
Referee: Halis Özkahya (Turkey)

== Goalscorers ==
There were 101 goals scored in 30 matches, for an average of 3.37 goals per match.

10 goals

- (Finland national football team) Teemu Pukki

4 goals

- (Bosnia and Herzegovina national football team) Amer Gojak
- (Italy national football team) Andrea Belotti

3 goals

- (Armenia national football team) Tigran Barseghyan
- (Armenia national football team) Aleksandre Karapetian
- (Armenia national football team) Henrikh Mkhitaryan
- (Bosnia and Herzegovina national football team) Edin Džeko
- (Bosnia and Herzegovina national football team) Armin Hodžić
- (Bosnia and Herzegovina national football team) Miralem Pjanić
- (Greece national football team) Kostas Fortounis
- (Italy national football team) Nicolò Barella
- (Italy national football team) Ciro Immobile
- (Italy national football team) Lorenzo Insigne
- (Italy national football team) Jorginho

2 goals

- (Armenia national football team) Gevorg Ghazaryan
- (Bosnia and Herzegovina national football team) Edin Višća
- (Finland national football team) Fredrik Jensen
- (Italy national football team) Federico Bernardeschi
- (Italy national football team) Moise Kean
- (Italy national football team) Fabio Quagliarella
- (Italy national football team) Alessio Romagnoli
- (Italy national football team) Marco Verratti
- (Italy national football team) Nicolò Zaniolo

1 goal

- (Armenia national football team) Edgar Babayan
- (Armenia national football team) Hovhannes Hambardzumyan
- (Bosnia and Herzegovina national football team) Eldar Ćivić
- (Bosnia and Herzegovina national football team) Izet Hajrović
- (Bosnia and Herzegovina national football team) Rade Krunić
- (Bosnia and Herzegovina national football team) Deni Milošević
- (Finland national football team) Benjamin Källman
- (Finland national football team) Joel Pohjanpalo
- (Finland national football team) Pyry Soiri
- (Finland national football team) Jasse Tuominen
- (Greece national football team) Anastasios Donis
- (Greece national football team) Konstantinos Galanopoulos
- (Greece national football team) Dimitris Kolovos
- (Greece national football team) Dimitrios Limnios
- (Greece national football team) Petros Mantalos
- (Greece national football team) Georgios Masouras
- (Greece national football team) Vangelis Pavlidis
- (Greece national football team) Zeca
- (Italy national football team) Francesco Acerbi
- (Italy national football team) Leonardo Bonucci
- (Italy national football team) Federico Chiesa
- (Italy national football team) Stephan El Shaarawy
- (Italy national football team) Riccardo Orsolini
- (Italy national football team) Leonardo Pavoletti
- (Italy national football team) Lorenzo Pellegrini
- (Italy national football team) Stefano Sensi
- (Liechtenstein national football team) Yanik Frick
- (Liechtenstein national football team) Dennis Salanović

1 own goal

- (Armenia national football team) Aram Ayrapetyan (against Italy)
- (Bosnia and Herzegovina national football team) Adnan Kovačević (against Greece)
- (Bosnia and Herzegovina national football team) Stjepan Lončar (against Armenia)
- (Liechtenstein national football team) Andreas Malin (against Bosnia and Herzegovina)

== Discipline ==
A player was automatically suspended for the next match for the following offences:

- Receiving a red card (red card suspensions could be extended for serious offences)
- Receiving three yellow cards in three different matches, as well as after fifth and any subsequent yellow card (yellow card suspensions were not carried forward to the play-offs, the finals or any other future international matches)

The following suspensions were served during the qualifying matches:

Team	Player	Offence(s)	Suspended for match(es)
Armenia	Varazdat Haroyan	(yellow card) vs Finland (26 March 2019); (yellow card) vs Liechtenstein (12 October 2019); (yellow card) vs Finland (15 October 2019)	vs Greece (15 November 2019)
Armenia	Rumyan Hovsepyan	(yellow card) vs Liechtenstein (8 June 2019); (yellow card) vs Liechtenstein (12 October 2019); (yellow card) vs Greece (15 November 2019)	vs Italy (18 November 2019)
Armenia	Aleksandre Karapetian	(yellow card) (yellow-red card) vs Italy (5 September 2019)	vs Bosnia and Herzegovina (8 September 2019)
Bosnia and Herzegovina	Miralem Pjanić	(red card) vs Greece (26 March 2019)	vs Finland (8 June 2019)
Finland	Tim Sparv	(yellow card) vs Italy (23 March 2019); (yellow card) vs Armenia (26 March 2019); (yellow card) vs Greece (5 September 2019)	vs Italy (8 September 2019)
Greece	Georgios Masouras	(yellow card) vs Liechtenstein (8 June 2019); (yellow card) vs Armenia (11 June 2019); (yellow card) vs Liechtenstein (8 September 2019)	vs Italy (12 October 2019)
Italy	Marco Verratti	(yellow card) vs Finland (23 March 2019); (yellow card) vs Greece (8 June 2019); (yellow card) vs Armenia (5 September 2019)	vs Finland (8 September 2019)
Liechtenstein	Daniel Kaufmann	(red card) vs Italy (26 March 2019)	vs Armenia (8 June 2019)
