= Statia Terminal =

- Full name: Statia Terminal
- Nickname(s): Terminal
- Founded: ~1980
- Dissolved: ~1985
- League: Sint Eustatius League
- 1984: 3rd

Statia Terminal was a Statia association football club based in Oranjestad. The club finished third in the final season and in the 1984 season of the Sint Eustatius League.
