= Abdul Ghani Malik (footballer) =

Malaysian footballer

Personal information
- Full name: Abdul Ghani bin Malik
- Date of birth: 25 May 1972 (age 54)
- Place of birth: Kuala Lumpur, Malaysia

Youth career
- 1989–1992: Kuala Lumpur U-21

Senior career*
Years	Team	Apps	(Gls)
1992–1995	Kuala Lumpur		
1996–1997	Perak		
1997–1998	KL Maju United		
1998	Kuala Lumpur		
1999–2003	Terengganu		
2004	Pahang		
2005	MPPJ Selangor		
2006–2007	TNB Kelantan		

International career^{‡}
1995–2001	Malaysia	30	(1)

Managerial career
- 2016: Sime Darby
- * Club domestic league appearances and goals as of 28 February 2009 ‡ National team caps and goals as of 31 August 2008

Abdul Ghani Malik (born 25 May 1972) is a former Malaysian footballer. He is a former member of the Malaysian national team.

== Career ==
=== Club ===
Starting his career in the Kuala Lumpur youth team, he was promoted to the senior squad in 1992. He also played for Perak, Terengganu and Pahang state teams in Malaysian league, as well as club teams such as KL Maju United, MPPJ Selangor and TNB Kelantan, the club where he concludes his playing career.

His accolades during his playing careers including winning the 2001 Malaysia Cup with Terengganu, 2004 Super League championship with Pahang, 2000 Malaysia FA Cup with Terengganu and Malaysia Charity Shield with Kuala Lumpur (1994) and Terengganu (2001). He also received Pingat Jasa Kebaktian award from the government of Terengganu after winning the Malaysia Cup for Terengganu.

=== National team ===
Ghani represented the Malaysia national football team from 1995 to 2001. He was in the squad for the SEA Games in 1995 and 1997, and also in the Tiger Cup squad in 1998 and 2000. He helped Malaysia gain third place in the 2000 Tiger Cup, beating Vietnam 3–0 in the third place play-off. He was also featured in the Malaysian team that faces Arsenal in a 1999 exhibition match. Malaysia lost 2–0 in that match.

He made 30 appearances for the Malaysia national team, scoring 1 goal against Bahrain in the 2001 Merdeka Tournament.

=== International Senior Goals ===
#	Date	Venue	Opponent	Score	Result	Competition
1.	21 June 2001	Shah Alam Stadium, Malaysia	Bahrain	2–4	Lost	2001 Merdeka Tournament

== Coaching career ==
Ghani works as assistant coach with UiTM. He was the head coach of Sime Darby in 2016 Malaysian League season. He was axed as Sime Darby head coach due to poor performance from the team.
