= Omer Joldić =

Bosnian football manager (born 1977)

Personal information
- Date of birth: 1 January 1977 (age 49)
- Place of birth: Tuzla, SFR Yugoslavia
- Height: 1.73 m (5 ft 8 in)
- Position: Defensive midfielder

Youth career
- 1986–1990: Sloboda Tuzla
- 1990–1994: Sarajevo

Senior career*
Years	Team	Apps	(Gls)
1994–2000	Sloboda Tuzla	156	(25)
2000–2001	Željezničar	39	(8)
2001–2003	Saturn Ramenskoye	23	(1)
2003–2005	Željezničar	45	(5)
2005–2006	GKS Bełchatów	5	(0)
2006–2008	Željezničar	41	(0)
2008–2009	Olimpik	6	(0)
Total		315	(39)

International career
1996–1999	Bosnia and Herzegovina U21	13	(0)
1997–2001	Bosnia and Herzegovina	21	(1)

Managerial career
- 2017–2022: Željezničar U19
- 2022–2023: Bosna Visoko
- * Club domestic league appearances and goals

Omer Joldić (born 1 January 1977) is a Bosnian professional football manager and former player.

== International career ==
Joldić made his debut for Bosnia and Herzegovina in a February 1997 Dunhill Cup match against Zimbabwe and has earned a total of 21 caps, scoring 1 goal. His final international was an August 2001 LG Cup match against South Africa.

== Career statistics ==
=== International goals ===
Scores and results list Bosnia and Herzegovina's goal tally first.

Goal	Date	Venue	Opponent	Score	Result	Competition
1.	15 March 2000	King Abdullah II Stadium, Amman, Jordan	Jordan	2–0	2–1	Friendly

== Honours ==
=== Player ===
Željezničar

- Bosnian Premier League: 2000–01
- Bosnian Cup: 2000–01
- Bosnian Supercup: 2000

Olimpik

- First League of FBiH: 2008–09
