= 2001 Merdeka Tournament =

International football competition

2001 Pestabola Merdeka
Tournament details
- Host country: Malaysia
- Dates: 21–30 June
- Teams: 8
- Venue: 1 (in 1 host city)

Final positions
- Champions: Uzbekistan (1st title)
- Runners-up: Bosnia and Herzegovina

Tournament statistics
- Matches played: 15
- Goals scored: 37 (2.47 per match)

The 2001 Merdeka Tournament is the 37th editions of the Merdeka Tournament and was held on 21 to 30 June 2001.

== Groups ==
=== Group stage ===
| Teams qualified for next phase |

Group A

| Team | Pts | Pld | W | D | L | GF | GA | GD |
|---|---|---|---|---|---|---|---|---|
| Bosnia and Herzegovina | 7 | 3 | 2 | 1 | 0 | 4 | 2 | +2 |
| Bahrain | 6 | 3 | 2 | 0 | 1 | 6 | 3 | +3 |
| Slovakia | 3 | 3 | 1 | 0 | 2 | 2 | 3 | –1 |
| Malaysia | 1 | 3 | 0 | 1 | 2 | 4 | 8 | –4 |

21 June
18:30

| Slovakia | 0–1 | Bosnia & Herzegovina |
|---|---|---|
| | | Milan Jambor 63' (o.g.) |

21 June
20:30

| Malaysia | 2–4 | Bahrain |
|---|---|---|
| Abdul Ghani Malik 25'; Gilbert Cassidy Gawing 52' | | Talal Yusuf 3'; Hussain Ali Ahmed 70', 85', 90' |

23 June
18:30

| Bosnia & Herzegovina | 1–0 | Bahrain |
|---|---|---|
| Almin Kulenović 3' |

23 June
20:30

| Malaysia | 0–2 | Slovakia |
|---|---|---|
| | | Mario Breska 13', 41' |

25 June
18:30

| Bahrain | 2–0 | Slovakia |
|---|---|---|
| Rashed Jamal 35', 66' |

25 June
20:30

| Malaysia | 2–2 | Bosnia & Herzegovina |
|---|---|---|
| Rusdi Suparman 70'; Ahmad Shahrul Azhar 83' | | Mohd Imran Ahmad 48' (o.g.); Enes Mešanović 74' |

Group B

| Team | Pts | Pld | W | D | L | GF | GA | GD |
|---|---|---|---|---|---|---|---|---|
| Uzbekistan | 9 | 3 | 3 | 0 | 0 | 5 | 1 | +4 |
| Malaysia U-23 | 6 | 3 | 2 | 0 | 1 | 4 | 4 | 0 |
| Thailand U-23 | 3 | 3 | 1 | 0 | 2 | 3 | 3 | 0 |
| India | 0 | 3 | 0 | 0 | 3 | 2 | 6 | –4 |

22 June
18:30

| Thailand U-23 | 0–1 | Uzbekistan |
|---|---|---|
| | | Bakhtiyor Hamidullaev 69' |

22 June
20:30

| Malaysia U-23 | 2–1 | India |
|---|---|---|
| Indra Putra Mahayuddin 46'; Mohd Nizaruddin Yusof 74' | | Jules Alberto 85' |

24 June
18:30

| Malaysia U-23 | 0–2 | Uzbekistan |
|---|---|---|
| | | Andrey Vlasichev 62'; Bakhodir Seytkamalov 71' |

24 June
20:30

| India | 0–2 | Thailand U-23 |
|---|---|---|
| | | Manit Noyvach 17'; Nirut Surasiang 71' |

26 June
18:30

| Uzbekistan | 2–1 | India |
|---|---|---|
| Bakhtiyor Hamidullaev 19'; Anvar Berdiev 32' | | I.M. Vijayan 45' |

26 June
20:30

| Malaysia U-23 | 2–1 | Thailand U-23 |
|---|---|---|
| S. Jayaprakash 32'; K. Rajan 84' | | Wuttiya Yong-ant 75' |

== Knockout stage ==
Semi-finals
28 June
Bosnia | 2
Malaysia U-23 | 0
28 June
Uzbekistan | 2
Bahrain | 0

Final
30 June
Bosnia | 1
Uzbekistan (a.e.t.) | 2

=== Semi finals ===
28 June
18:30

| Bosnia & Herzegovina | 2–0 | Malaysia U-23 |
|---|---|---|
| Jasmin Hurić 12'; Almin Kulenović 19' |

28 June
20:30

| Uzbekistan | 2–0 | Bahrain |
|---|---|---|
| Bakhodir Seytkamalov 89', 90' |

=== Finals ===
30 June
20:30

| Bosnia & Herzegovina | 1–2 (a.e.t.) | Uzbekistan |
|---|---|---|
| Velimir Brašnić 90' | | Leonid Koshelev 83'; Bakhtiyor Hamidullaev 119' |

== Award ==
2001 Merdeka Tournament winner

Uzbekistan
1st title
