= Raddics =

- Full name: Raddics
- Founded: ~1980
- Dissolved: ~1985
- League: Sint Eustatius League
- 1984: 2nd

Raddics was a Statia association football club based in Oranjestad. The clubs best achievement came in 1982 and 1984 when they finished as runners up in the Sint Eustatius League.
