= Sint Eustatius League =

The Sint Eustatius Football League was a league competition held on Sint Eustatius from 1980 until 1984.

== Known teams ==
- Aswad
- Golden Eagles
- Golden Stars
- Peps Monks
- Raddics
- Statia Terminal
- Superstars

== Champions ==
- 1980 : not known
- 1981 : not known
- 1982 : not known
- 1983 : Golden Eagles
- 1984 : Golden Eagles
