= Toni Tervonen =

Finnish footballer (born 1977)

Personal information
- Full name: Toni Tapani Tervonen
- Date of birth: 14 March 1977 (age 49)
- Height: 1.90 m (6 ft 3 in)
- Position: Defender

Senior career*
Years	Team	Apps	(Gls)
1994–1996	KuPS	44	(4)
1997–1998	FinnPa	31	(2)
1999	Haugesund	5	(1)
2000	Kotkan TP	15	(0)
2001–2002	Jokerit	33	(1)

International career
- Finland U21
1996–1999	Finland	4	(1)
- * Club domestic league appearances and goals

Toni Tervonen (born 14 March 1977) is a retired Finnish football defender. He was capped four times for the Finland national team during 1996–1999.

== Career statistics ==
=== Club ===
Appearances and goals by club, season and competition
Club	Season	League			Cup (Note: Includes Norwegian Cup and Suomen Cup)		Europe		Total	
Club	Season	Division	Apps	Goals	Apps	Goals	Apps	Goals	Apps	Goals
KuPS	1994	Veikkausliiga	2	0	–		–		2	0
KuPS	1995	Ykkönen	21	2	–		–		21	2
KuPS	1996	Ykkönen	21	2	–		–		21	2
KuPS	Total		44	4	0	0	0	0	44	4
FinnPa	1997	Veikkausliiga	9	0	–		–		9	0
FinnPa	1998	Veikkausliiga	22	2	–		2 (Note: Appearances in UEFA Cup)	0	24	2
FinnPa	Total		31	2	0	0	2	0	33	2
Haugesund	1999	1. divisjon	5	1	1	0	–		6	1
Haugesund 2	1999	2. divisjon	1	0	–		–		1	0
Kotkan TP	2000	Veikkausliiga	15	0	1	0	–		16	0
Jokerit	2001	Veikkausliiga	27	0	–		2	0	29	0
Jokerit	2002	Ykkönen	6	1	–		–		6	1
Jokerit	Total		33	1	0	0	2	0	35	1
Career total			129	8	2	0	4	0	135	8

=== International ===
Appearances and goals by national team and year
National team	Year	Apps	Goals
Finland
Finland	1996	1	0
Finland	1997	2	1
Finland	1998	0	0
Finland	1999	1	0
Total		4	1

Scores and results list Finland's goal tally first, score column indicates score after each Tervonen goal.

List of international goals scored by Toni Tervonen
No.	Date	Venue	Opponent	Score	Result	Competition
1.	21 February 1997	Stadium Merdeka, Kuala Lumpur, Malaysia	Malaysia	1–1	1–2	Friendly
