= Alois Bunjira =

Zimbabwean footballer (born 1975)

Personal information
- Date of birth: 29 March 1975 (age 51)
- Place of birth: Chitungwiza, Zimbabwe
- Height: 1.74 m (5 ft 8 1/2 in)
- Position: Midfielder

Senior career*
Years	Team	Apps	(Gls)
1994	Darryn Textiles		
1995	Blackpool		
1996–1999	CAPS United		
1999	QwaQwa Stars	8	(1)
1999–2002	Bidvest Wits	84	(18)
2002–2003	Mamelodi Sundowns	22	(2)
2003–2005	Bidvest Wits	62	(12)
2005–2007	Jomo Cosmos	10	(1)
2007–2009	FC AK		
Total		176+	(34+)

International career
1994–2002	Zimbabwe	17	(3)
- * Club domestic league appearances and goals

Alois Bunjira (born 29 March 1975) is a Zimbabwean former international footballer who played as a midfielder.

== Career ==
Born in Chitungwiza, Bunjira played for Darryn Textiles, Blackpool, CAPS United, QwaQwa Stars, Bidvest Wits, Mamelodi Sundowns, Jomo Cosmos and FC AK.

He played for Zimbabwe between 1994 and 2001.
