= Dželaludin Muharemović =

Bosnian football manager (born 1970)

Personal information
- Date of birth: 23 March 1970 (age 56)
- Place of birth: Sarajevo, SFR Yugoslavia
- Height: 1.81 m (5 ft 11 in)
- Position: Midfielder

Team information
- Current team: FK UNIS Vogošća (manager)

Senior career*
| Years | Team | Apps | (Gls) |
| 1990–1992 | UNIS Vogošća | | |
| 1994–1996 | Željezničar | 31 | (15) |
| 1996 | Zagreb | 20 | (8) |
| 1997–2001 | Željezničar | 126 | (88) |
| 2002 | Volgar Astrahan | 10 | (1) |
| 2002–2005 | Željezničar | 46 | (24) |
| Total | | 233 | (136) |

International career
| 1997–2001 | Bosnia and Herzegovina | 16 | (2) |
| 2001 | Bosnia and Herzegovina XI | 3 | (4) |

Managerial career
- 2006: Željezničar (caretaker)
- 2015: Velež Mostar
- 2018–2019: Dalian Transcendence
- 2019: Dalian Chanjoy
- 2021–2023: UNIS Vogošća
- 2023: Guangxi Pingguo Haliao
- 2023-: FK UNIS Vogošća
- * Club domestic league appearances and goals

Dželaludin Muharemović (born 23 March 1970) is a Bosnian professional football manager and former player. He is currently the manager Chinese club Guangxi Pingguo Haliao.

== Club career ==
As a child, Muharemović started playing football for his hometown club Željezničar. He was considered to be one of the biggest prospects in the club and when he had reached the senior squad, he was sent on loan to UNIS Vogošća.

In 1992, war in Bosnia and Herzegovina began and every football activity was stopped. However, the club was reestablished soon and Muharemović played in the first Bosnian championship in 1994. After that, he moved to Croatian side Zagreb.

One year later, he returned to Željezničar and in a course of ten seasons he played more than 300 official games for the club, scoring 127 goals.

In the winter of 2001, Muharemović moved to rich Russian second division club Volgar Astrahan. He stayed there less than a year, as he returned to Željezničar in autumn.

In the spring of 2005, he declared that he was retiring from football. Muharemović played in 172 league games for Željezničar, scoring 112 league goals in the process, a club record. He is also the joint highest goalscorer in the history of the club, alongside Josip Bukal, scoring 127 goals in all competitions.

== International career ==
Muharemović made his debut for the Bosnia and Herzegovina national team on 22 February 1997 in a Dunhill Cup game against Vietnam (Bosnia won 4–0). He also scored a brace at the LG Cup 2001 vs South Africa. He has earned a total of 19 caps, scoring 6 goals. Three games (4 goals) were unofficial. His final international was an October 2001 FIFA World Cup qualification match against Liechtenstein.

== Managerial career ==
After retirement, Željezničar's club chairman at the time offered Muharemović the position of sporting director. He accepted the offer, but after manager Nenad Starovlah was sacked in September 2006, he temporary took over his position as a replacement.

For a short period in 2015, he was manager of Velež Mostar.

On 11 April 2018, Muharemović became the new manager of Chinese club Dalian Transcendence, where he worked as an assistant manager with Rusmir Cviko previously.

On 10 February 2019, after Dalian Transcendence decided to quit the professional league in China, he moved to a nearby team Dalian Chanjoy in the China League Two. He left Dalian in December 2019.

== Career statistics ==
| # | Date | Venue | Opponent | Score | Result | Competition |
|---|---|---|---|---|---|---|
| 1. | 22 February 1997 | Stadium Merdeka, Kuala Lumpur, Malaysia | Vietnam | 4–0 | Won | 1997 Dunhill Cup Malaysia |
| 2. | 24 February 1997 | Stadium Merdeka, Kuala Lumpur, Malaysia | Zimbabwe | 2–2 | Drew | 1997 Dunhill Cup Malaysia |
| 3. | 18 January 2001 | Jawaharlal Nehru Stadium, Kochi, India | Uruguay | 2–3 | Won | Millenium Super Soccer Cup |
| 4. | 22 January 2001 | Salt Lake Stadium, Kolkata, India | Chile | 0–1 | Won | Millenium Super Soccer Cup |
| 5. and 6. | 8 August 2001 | Azadi Stadium, Tehran, Iran | South Africa | 2–4 | Won | 2001 LF Cup Iran |
Correct as of match played on 8 August 2001

== Managerial statistics ==
As of 10 June 2023

Managerial record by team and tenure
| Team | From | To | Record | | | | | | | |
| Team | From | To | G | W | D | L | GF | GA | GD | Win % |
|---|---|---|---|---|---|---|---|---|---|---|
| Željezničar (caretaker) | 19 September 2006 | 31 December 2006 | 14 | 5 | 4 | 5 | 23 | 15 | +8 | 35.71 |
| Velež Mostar | 20 July 2015 | 23 August 2015 | 5 | 0 | 3 | 2 | 3 | 5 | −2 | 0.00 |
| Dalian Transcendence | 11 April 2018 | 12 January 2019 | 25 | 7 | 7 | 11 | 25 | 35 | −10 | 28.00 |
| Dalian Chanjoy | 10 February 2019 | 31 December 2019 | 34 | 14 | 7 | 13 | 68 | 52 | +16 | 41.18 |
| UNIS Vogošća | 6 January 2021 | 2 February 2023 | 60 | 24 | 18 | 18 | 102 | 75 | +27 | 40.00 |
| Guangxi Pingguo Haliao | 3 February 2023 | Present | 8 | 6 | 2 | 0 | 16 | 2 | +14 | 75.00 |
| Total | | | 146 | 56 | 41 | 49 | 237 | 184 | +53 | 38.36 |

== Honours ==
=== Player ===
Željezničar

- Bosnian First League: 1997–98
- Bosnian Premier League: 2000–01, 2001–02
- Bosnian Cup: 1999–00, 2000–01, 2002–03
- Bosnian Supercup: 1998, 2000, 2001

Individual

- Bosnian Premier League top scorer: 2000–01
