= Asim Hrnjić =

Bosnian footballer

Personal information
- Date of birth: 15 February 1964 (age 62)
- Place of birth: Maglaj, SFR Yugoslavia
- Position: Striker

Team information
- Current team: Vis Simm-Bau (assistant)

Youth career
- Natron Maglaj

Senior career*
Years	Team	Apps	(Gls)
1995–2000	NK Zenica	123	(25)
2000	Velež Mostar	14	(1)
2001	Rudar Kakanj	15	(1)
–2004	TOŠK Tešanj		

International career
1995–1997	Bosnia and Herzegovina	7	(3)

Managerial career
- 2018–2019: Čelik Zenica (assistant)
- 2022–: Vis Simm-Bau (assistant)
- * Club domestic league appearances and goals

Asim Hrnjić (born 15 February 1964) is a Bosnian retired footballer. He works as an assistant manager at First League of FBiH club Vis Simm-Bau.

== Club career ==
He started his career at hometown club Natron before joining NK Zenica in 1994. He later played for Velež Mostar and Rudar Kakanj before calling it a day at 40 years of age and playing for TOŠK Tešanj.

== International career ==
Hrnjić made his debut in Bosnia and Herzegovina's first ever official international game, a November 1995 friendly match away against Albania, and has earned a total of 7 caps, scoring 3 goals. His final international was a March 1997 Dunhill Cup match against China.

=== International goals ===
#	Date	Venue	Opponent	Score	Result	Competition
1.	24 February 1997	Stadium Merdeka, Kuala Lumpur, Malaysia	Zimbabwe	1–1	2–2	1997 Dunhill Cup Malaysia
2.	26 February 1997	Stadium Merdeka, Kuala Lumpur, Malaysia	Indonesia	0–2	0–2	1997 Dunhill Cup Malaysia
3.	28 February 1997	Stadium Merdeka, Kuala Lumpur, Malaysia	Malaysia	0–1	0–1	1997 Dunhill Cup Malaysia
