= Ramiz Husić =

Bosnian footballer

Personal information
- Full name: Ramiz Husić
- Date of birth: 1 October 1973 (age 53)
- Place of birth: Kakanj, SFR Yugoslavia
- Position: Defender

Team information
- Current team: Rudar Kakanj (manager)

Senior career*
Years	Team	Apps	(Gls)
1995–2001	Rudar Kakanj	166	(27)
2002	ERA Šmartno	3	(0)
2003–2004	Rudar Kakanj		
2004–2005	Budućnost Banovići	0	(0)
2005–2009	Rudar Kakanj		

International career^{‡}
1999–2001	Bosnia and Herzegovina	4	(0)
2001	Bosnia and Herzegovina XI	1	(1)

Managerial career
- 2021: Rudar Kakanj
- * Club domestic league appearances and goals ‡ National team caps and goals as of 18 June 2021

Ramiz Husić (born 1 October 1973) is a Bosnian professional football manager and former player.

== Playing career ==
=== Club ===
Husić was signed by German second tier side Chemnitzer FC in summer 2000, but was released after some poor performances in the pre-season.

=== International ===
He made his debut for Bosnia and Herzegovina in an August 1999 friendly match away against Liechtenstein and has earned a total of four caps, scoring no goals. He did score a goal in an unofficial match though. His final international was an August 2001 LG Cup match against Iran.

== Managerial career ==
After spending years as assistant coach at the club, Husić was appointed head coach of Rudar Kakanj in March 2021. He replaced Bećir Mehanović at the helm.

== Managerial statistics ==
As of 25 September 2023

Team	Nat	From	To	Record							
Team	Nat	From	To	G	W	D	L	GF	GA	GD	Win %
Rudar Kakanj	(Bosnia and Herzegovina)	30 March 2021	19 June 2021	11	6	2	3	16	13	+3	54.55
Career totals				11	6	2	3	16	13	+3	54.55
