= Golden Eagles FC =

- Full name: Golden Eagles Football Club
- Founded: ~1980
- Dissolved: ~1985
- League: Sint Eustatius League
- 1984: 1st

Golden Eagles FC was a Statia association football club based in Oranjestad. The club is historically known as one of the most successful clubs in the Sint Eustatius League, having two known titles.

== Honors ==
- Sint Eustatius League: 2

1983, 1984
