= Sanjin Pintul =

Bosnia and Herzegovina footballer

Sanin Pintul
Personal information
- Date of birth: 18 November 1970 (age 55)
- Place of birth: Mostar, SFR Yugoslavia
- Height: 1.86 m (6 ft 1 in)
- Position: Defender

Senior career*
Years	Team	Apps	(Gls)
1989–1992	Velež	12+	(0+)
1992–1995	Stahl Brandenburg	31	(2)
1995	VfB Oldenburg	8	(0)
1996–1997	Željezničar	21	(1)
1997	Athletico-PR		
1997–1998	Karabükspor	14	(0)
1998–2001	Young Boys	19+	(0+)

International career
1996–1997	Bosnia and Herzegovina	7	(2)
- * Club domestic league appearances and goals

Sanin Pintul (born 18 November 1970) is a Bosnia and Herzegovina former footballer who is last known to have played as a defender for Young Boys.

== Club career ==
In 1994, Pintul signed for German third division side Stahl Brandenburg.

Before the 1997 season, he signed for Athletico-PR in Brazil, becoming the first Eastern European to play there.

In 1997, he signed for Turkish club Karabükspor.

In 1998, Pintul signed for Young Boys in Switzerland.

== International career ==
He made his debut for Bosnia and Herzegovina in an October 1996 World Cup qualification match against Croatia and has earned a total of 7 caps, scoring 2 goals. His final international was a February 1997 Dunhill Cup match against Malaysia.

=== International goals ===
Scores and results list Bosnia and Herzegovina's goal tally first.

No.	Date	Venue	Opponent	Score	Result	Competition
1.	22 February 1997	Stadium Merdeka, Kuala Lumpur, Malaysia	Vietnam	2–0	4–0	Dunhill Cup
2.	26 February 1997	Stadium Merdeka, Kuala Lumpur, Malaysia	Indonesia	1–0	2–0	Dunhill Cup
