= Enes Mešanović =

Bosnian-Herzegovinan footballer (born 1975)

Personal information
- Full name: Enes Mešanović
- Date of birth: 22 August 1975 (age 51)
- Place of birth: Tuzla, SFR Yugoslavia
- Height: 1.80 m (5 ft 11 in)
- Position: Forward

Senior career*
Years	Team	Apps	(Gls)
1997–1999	Sloboda Tuzla	32	(22)
1999–2000	Erzurumspor	57	(16)
2001	Brotnjo	24	(7)
2001–2002	Dinamo Zagreb	12	(2)
2002–2003	Osijek	10	(0)
2003–2004	Maribor	24	(5)
2004	Sloboda Tuzla	12	(3)
2005	Sarajevo	13	(2)
2006	Sloboda Tuzla	14	(5)
2006	Bargh Shiraz F.C.	7	(2)
2006–2007	Sloboda Tuzla	24	(7)
2007	Croatia Sesvete		

International career
	Bosnia U-21	1	
2001	Bosnia and Herzegovina	3	(1)
2001	Bosnia and Herzegovina XI	2	(0)

Managerial career
- 2007–2008: Sloboda Tuzla
- * Club domestic league appearances and goals as of 3 May 2016

Enes Mešanović (born 22 August 1975) is a retired Bosnian-Herzegovinian international footballer, who played for Sloboda Tuzla in Bosnia and Herzegovina, Dinamo Zagreb and Osijek in Croatia and had a brief spell with Erzurumspor in the Turkish Super Lig. He is currently manager of youth football school Sport Klub Bambi.

== Club career ==
Mešanović won the Croatian Championship with Dinamo Zagreb during the 2002–03 season.

== International career ==
Mešanović made his debut for Bosnia and Herzegovina in a June 2001 Merdeka Tournament match against Slovakia and has earned a total of 5 caps, scoring 1 goal. Two of his games at the Merdeka were unofficial, though. His final international was a July 2001 friendly match against Iran.

=== International goals ===
#	Date	Venue	Opponent	Score	Result	Competition
1.	25 June 2001	Shah Alam Stadium, Shah Alam, Malaysia	Malaysia	1–2	2–2	Friendly
