= Andreas Malin =

Liechtenstein footballer

Personal information
- Date of birth: 31 January 1994 (age 32)
- Place of birth: Feldkirch, Austria
- Height: 1.84 m (6 ft 0 in)
- Position: Defender

Team information
- Current team: SC Göfis

Youth career
- 2009–2012: AKA Vorarlberg

Senior career*
Years	Team	Apps	(Gls)
2012–2013	FC Dornbirn 1913	22	(0)
2013–2014	SC Bregenz	23	(0)
2014–2016	USV Eschen/Mauren	37	(1)
2016–2021	FC Dornbirn 1913	96	(9)
2021–2025	FC Rot-Weiß Rankweil	61	(5)
2025–	SC Göfis	13	(0)

International career^{‡}
2013–2016	Liechtenstein U21	17	(0)
2016–	Liechtenstein	60	(0)
- * Club domestic league appearances and goals as of 6 June 2026 ‡ National team caps and goals as of 16 November 2026

Andreas Malin (born 31 January 1994) is a Liechtensteiner footballer who plays for Austrian third-tier Eliteliga Vorarlberg club SC Göfis.

== International career ==
He is a member of the Liechtenstein national football team, making his debut in a friendly match against Iceland on 6 June 2016. Malin also made 17 appearances for the Liechtenstein U21 from 2013 to 2016.
