= Jasmin Hurić =

Bosnia and Herzegovina footballer

Personal information
- Full name: Jasmin Hurić
- Date of birth: 14 September 1972 (age 54)
- Place of birth: Sarajevo, SFR Yugoslavia
- Height: 1.79 m (5 ft 10 in)
- Position: Defender

Senior career*
Years	Team	Apps	(Gls)
1991–1997	Željezničar		
1998–1999	Dinamo Zagreb	0	(0)
1999–2000	Jedinstvo Bihać		
2000–2003	Primorje	109	(0)
2003–2004	Posušje		

International career
2001–2002	Bosnia and Herzegovina	6	(0)
- * Club domestic league appearances and goals

Jasmin Hurić (born 14 September 1972) is a former Bosnian-Herzegovinian international football player.

== International career ==
He made his debut for Bosnia and Herzegovina in a June 2001 friendly match against Slovakia and has earned a total of 8 caps (2 unofficial), scoring no goals. His final international was an October 2002 European Championship qualification match against Norway.
