= 2001 LG Cup (Iran) =

2001 LG Cup Iran
Tournament details
- Host country: Iran
- City: Tehran
- Dates: 8–10 August
- Teams: 4
- Venue: 1 (in 1 host city)

Final positions
- Champions: Iran (1st title)
- Runners-up: Bosnia and Herzegovina
- Third place: Oman
- Fourth place: South Africa

Tournament statistics
- Matches played: 4
- Goals scored: 19 (4.75 per match)
- Top scorer: (Iran) Sirous Dinmohammadi (3 goals)

The LG Cup Iran is an exhibition association football tournament that took place in Tehran, Iran in 2001.

== Participating nations ==
Country	Confederation	FIFA ranking (18 July 2001)
Bosnia and Herzegovina	UEFA	75
Iran (hosts)	AFC	51
Oman	AFC	91
South Africa B	CAF	25

== Venues ==
Tehran is located in Iran	Tehran
Tehran is located in Iran	Azadi Stadium
Tehran is located in Iran	Capacity: 100,000

== Results ==
=== Semifinals ===
8 August 2001

South Africa B	2–4	Bosnia and Herzegovina
Makhubela 15', 70' (pen.)	report	Muharemović 35', 90'; Adžem 40'; Husić 90'

Azadi Stadium, Tehran
Attendance: 40,000
Referee: Hamirad (Iran)
8 August 2001

Iran	5–2	Oman
Golmohammadi 2'; Dinmohammadi 19', 35', 85'; Daei 38' (pen.)	report Report; Report	Abdullah Al-Sa'adi 40'; Fawzi Bashir 61'

Azadi Stadium, Tehran

=== Third place match ===
10 August 2001

South Africa B	0–2	Oman
	report	Nabil Al-Dabet 36'; Mohamed Saleh 88'

Azadi Stadium, Tehran

=== Final ===
10 August 2001

Iran	4–0	Bosnia and Herzegovina
Hasheminasab 5', 90'; Karimi 65'; Daei 87'	report Report; Report

Azadi Stadium, Tehran
Attendance: 80,000
Referee: Fayuideen Faris (Syria)

2001 LG Cup (Iran) winner

Iran
First title

== Scorers ==
3 goal

- (Iran) Sirous Dinmohammadi

2 goal

- (Bosnia and Herzegovina) Dželaludin Muharemović
- (Iran) Ali Daei
- (Iran) Mehdi Hasheminasab
- (South Africa) B Makhubela

1 goal

- (Bosnia and Herzegovina) Admir Adžem
- (Bosnia and Herzegovina) Ramiz Husić
- (Oman) Abdullah Al-Sa'adi
- (Oman) Fawzi Bashir Doorbeen
- (Oman) Nabil Al-Dabet
- (Oman) Mohamed Saleh
- (Iran) Yahya Golmohammadi
- (Iran) Ali Karimi

== See also ==
- LG Cup
