= 2021 UEFA European Under-21 Championship qualification Group 2 =

Football tournament qualification stage

Group 2 of the 2021 UEFA European Under-21 Championship qualifying competition consisted of six teams: France, Slovakia, Switzerland, Georgia, Azerbaijan, and Liechtenstein. The composition of the nine groups in the qualifying group stage was decided by the draw held on 11 December 2018, 09:00 CET (UTC+1), at the UEFA headquarters in Nyon, Switzerland, with the teams seeded according to their coefficient ranking.

The group was originally scheduled to be played in home-and-away round-robin format between 6 June 2019 and 13 October 2020. Under the original format, the group winners and the best runners-up among all nine groups (not counting results against the sixth-placed team) would qualify directly for the final tournament, while the remaining eight runners-up would advance to the play-offs.

On 17 March 2020, all matches were put on hold due to the COVID-19 pandemic. On 17 June 2020, UEFA announced that the qualifying group stage would be extended and end on 17 November 2020, while the play-offs, originally scheduled to be played in November 2020, would be cancelled. Instead, the group winners and the five best runners-up among all nine groups (not counting results against the sixth-placed team) would qualify for the final tournament.

== Standings ==
Pos	Team	Pld	W	D	L	GF	GA	GD	Pts	Qualification	France	Switzerland	Georgia	Slovakia	Azerbaijan	Liechtenstein
1	France	10	9	0	1	32	10	+22	27	Final tournament	—	3–1	3–2	1–0	5–0	5–0
2	Switzerland	10	9	0	1	26	8	+18	27	Final tournament	3–1	—	2–1	4–1	2–1	3–0
3	Georgia	10	5	0	5	17	14	+3	15		0–2	0–3	—	2–1	1–0	4–0
4	Slovakia	10	4	0	6	22	21	+1	12		3–5	1–2	3–2	—	2–1	6–0
5	Azerbaijan	10	2	0	8	6	18	−12	6		1–2	0–1	0–3	2–1	—	1–0
6	Liechtenstein	10	1	0	9	3	35	−32	3		0–5	0–5	0–2	2–4	1–0	—

Source: UEFA
Rules for classification: Tiebreakers

== Matches ==
Times are CET/CEST, (Note: CEST (UTC+2) for dates between 31 March and 26 October 2019 and between 29 March and 24 October 2020, and CET (UTC+1) for all other dates.) as listed by UEFA (local times, if different, are in parentheses).

6 June 2019
19:00

Liechtenstein	1–0	Azerbaijan
Frick 10' (pen.)	Report

Sportpark Eschen-Mauren, Eschen
Attendance: 323
Referee: Tim Marshall (Northern Ireland)

5 September 2019
17:00 (19:00 GET)

Georgia	4–0	Liechtenstein
Kavtaradze 30'; Samurkasovi 36'; Arabidze 53'; Bugridze 70'	Report

Tengiz Burjanadze Stadium, Gori
Attendance: 2,000
Referee: Alex Troleis (Faroe Islands)
6 September 2019
18:30 (20:30 AZT)

Azerbaijan	2–1	Slovakia
Ekincier 7', 90+3'	Report	Tupta 82'

Dalga Arena, Baku
Attendance: 274
Referee: Dejan Jakimovski (North Macedonia)

10 September 2019
18:30

Liechtenstein	0–5	Switzerland
	Report	Zeqiri 40', 49'; Ndoye 74'; Okafor 77'; Stojilković 90+3'

Rheinpark Stadion, Vaduz
Attendance: 774
Referee: Paul McLaughlin (Republic of Ireland)
10 September 2019
18:30 (20:30 AZT)

Azerbaijan	0–3	Georgia
	Report	Arveladze 45+3'; Bugridze 73'; Arabidze 84'

Dalga Arena, Baku
Attendance: 357
Referee: Laurent Kopriwa (Luxembourg)

9 October 2019
18:00

Liechtenstein	2–4	Slovakia
Caglar 63'; Frick 67'	Report	Strelec 8'; Bernát 43'; Herc 68', 90+3'

Sportpark Eschen-Mauren, Eschen
Attendance: 275
Referee: Vilhjálmur Thórarinsson (Iceland)
10 October 2019
21:00

France	5–0	Azerbaijan
Édouard 2', 36'; Zagadou 40'; Aouar 51'; Nordin 76'	Report

Stade de l'Épopée, Calais
Attendance: 8,912
Referee: António Nobre (Portugal)
11 October 2019
19:00

Switzerland	2–1	Georgia
Vargas 57'; Lotomba 83'	Report	Arabidze 61'

Stadion Schützenwiese, Winterthur
Attendance: 650
Referee: Trustin Farrugia Cann (Malta)

15 October 2019
18:00 (20:00 AZT)

Azerbaijan	0–1	Switzerland
	Report	Bajrami 33'

Kapital Bank Arena, Sumqayit
Attendance: 1,517
Referee: Novak Simović (Serbia)
15 October 2019
21:00

Slovakia	3–5	France
Strelec 5'; Herc 52'; Tupta 62'	Report	Reine-Adélaïde 3'; Aouar 13'; Édouard 23', 35', 81'

MOL Aréna, Dunajská Streda
Attendance: 2,603
Referee: Donald Robertson (Scotland)

14 November 2019
15:00 (18:00 AZT)

Azerbaijan	1–0	Liechtenstein
Ekincier 65'	Report

Kapital Bank Arena, Sumqayit
Attendance: 715
Referee: Loukas Soteriou (Cyprus)
15 November 2019
21:00

France	3–2	Georgia
Reine-Adélaïde 15', 54'; Édouard 90+2' (pen.)	Report	Kokhreidze 58'; Kvaratskhelia 60'

Stade Marcel Picot, Tomblaine
Attendance: 11,798
Referee: Christopher Jaeger (Austria)

18 November 2019
18:00

Slovakia	3–2	Georgia
Kolesár 28'; Herc 52'; Gamboš 66'	Report	Kutsia 8'; Spanderashvili 89'

Štadión pod Zoborom, Nitra
Attendance: 1548
Referee: Eldorjan Hamiti (Albania)
19 November 2019
19:00

Switzerland	3–1	France
Guillemenot 44'; Zeqiri 45+1', 53'	Report	Édouard 19' (pen.)

Stade de la Maladière, Neuchâtel
Attendance: 9021
Referee: Stuart Attwell (England)

4 September 2020
19:00 (21:00 GET)

Georgia	0–2	France
	Report	Beriashvili 38' (o.g.); Édouard 90+3' (pen.)

Tengiz Burjanadze Stadium, Gori
Attendance: 0 (Note: Due to the COVID-19 pandemic in Europe, all matches scheduled for September 2020 were played behind closed doors.)
Referee: Duje Strukan (Croatia)
4 September 2020
19:00

Switzerland	4–1	Slovakia
Zeqiri 10' (pen.), 77'; Okafor 37'; Ndoye 71'	Report	Tupta 43'

LIPO Park Schaffhausen, Schaffhausen
Attendance: 0
Referee: Mads Kristoffersen (Denmark)

7 September 2020
19:00 (21:00 AZT)

Azerbaijan	1–2	France
Bayramov 90+1'	Report	Édouard 26' (pen.); Gouiri 84'

Kapital Bank Arena, Sumqayit
Attendance: 0
Referee: Halis Özkahya (Turkey)
8 September 2020
17:00

Liechtenstein	0–2	Georgia
	Report	Spanderashvili 20'; Samurkasovi 35'

Sportpark Eschen-Mauren, Eschen
Attendance: 0
Referee: Dragomir Draganov (Bulgaria)
8 September 2020
20:15

Slovakia	1–2	Switzerland
Strelec 66'	Report	Zeqiri 88' (pen.); Ndoye 90+3'

Štadión pod Zoborom, Nitra
Attendance: 0
Referee: Keith Kennedy (Northern Ireland)

8 October 2020
16:30

Slovakia	2–1	Azerbaijan
Tupta 61'; Mesík 90+4'	Report	Çelik 66'

Štadión pod Zoborom, Nitra
Attendance: 0
Referee: Kristoffer Hagenes (Norway)
8 October 2020
21:00

France	5–0	Liechtenstein
Gouiri 7', 30'; Ikoné 9'; Marxer 43' (o.g.); Faivre 51'	Report

Stade de la Meinau, Strasbourg
Attendance: 1321
Referee: Ian McNabb (Northern Ireland)
9 October 2020
18:00 (20:00 GET)

Georgia	0–3	Switzerland
	Report	Ndoye 27'; Zeqiri 69' (pen.); Pusic 81'

Tengiz Burjanadze Stadium, Gori
Attendance: 0
Referee: Jonathan Lardot (Belgium)

12 October 2020
21:00

France	1–0	Slovakia
Koundé 22'	Report

Stade de la Meinau, Strasbourg
Attendance: 2287
Referee: Miloš Djordjic (Serbia)
13 October 2020
17:00 (19:00 GET)

Georgia	1–0	Azerbaijan
Guliashvili 42'	Report

Tengiz Burjanadze Stadium, Gori
Attendance: 0
Referee: Dzmitry Dzmitryieu (Belarus)
13 October 2020
18:00

Switzerland	3–0	Liechtenstein
Guillemenot 4'; Zeqiri 42'; Sidler 54'	Report

Tissot Arena, Biel/Bienne
Attendance: 532
Referee: Daniyar Sakhi (Kazakhstan)

12 November 2020 (Note: All matches originally scheduled to be played in March 2020 were postponed due to the COVID-19 pandemic in Europe. These matches were subsequently rescheduled to be played in November 2020.)
11:00 (13:00 GET)

Georgia	2–1	Slovakia
Fabiš 9' (o.g.); Mekvabishvili 78'	Report	Gono 90+1'

Mikheil Meskhi Stadium, Tbilisi
Attendance: 0
Referee: Gergő Bogár (Hungary)
12 November 2020
19:00

Switzerland	2–1	Azerbaijan
Toma 49'; Stojilković 90+1'	Report	Kökçü 22'

Stockhorn Arena, Thun
Attendance: 0
Referee: Kaspar Sjöberg (Sweden)
12 November 2020
20:45

Liechtenstein	0–5	France
	Report	Dagba 3'; Faivre 5'; Spirig 17' (o.g.); Reine-Adélaïde 57'; Lihadji 80'

Rheinpark Stadion, Vaduz
Attendance: 0
Referee: Morten Krogh (Denmark)

16 November 2020
21:00

France	3–1	Switzerland
Édouard 18', 23'; Kolo 90+2'	Report	Imeri 88'

Stade Michel d'Ornano, Caen
Attendance: 0
Referee: Vitali Meshkov (Russia)
17 November 2020
17:00

Slovakia	6–0	Liechtenstein
Kadák 5'; Unterrainer 9' (o.g.); Almási 33'; Gono 67'; Bernát 71'; Vallo 77'	Report

Štadión pod Zoborom, Nitra
Attendance: 0
Referee: Nicolas Laforge (Belgium)

== Goalscorers ==
There were 106 goals scored in 30 matches, for an average of 3.53 goals per match.

11 goals

- (France) Odsonne Édouard

9 goals

- (Switzerland) Andi Zeqiri

4 goals

- (France) Jeff Reine-Adélaïde
- (Slovakia) Christián Herc
- (Slovakia) Ľubomír Tupta
- (Switzerland) Dan Ndoye

3 goals

- (Azerbaijan) Baris Ekincier
- (France) Amine Gouiri
- (Georgia (country)) Giorgi Arabidze
- (Slovakia) Dávid Strelec

2 goals

- (France) Houssem Aouar
- (France) Romain Faivre
- (Georgia (country)) Irakli Bugridze
- (Georgia (country)) Davit Samurkasovi
- (Georgia (country)) Nugzar Spanderashvili
- (Liechtenstein) Noah Frick
- (Slovakia) Ján Bernát
- (Slovakia) Miroslav Gono
- (Switzerland) Jérémy Guillemenot
- (Switzerland) Noah Okafor
- (Switzerland) Filip Stojilković

1 goal

- (Azerbaijan) Tural Bayramov
- (Azerbaijan) Mert Çelik
- (Azerbaijan) Ozan Kökçü
- (France) Colin Dagba
- (France) Jonathan Ikoné
- (France) Randal Kolo
- (France) Jules Koundé
- (France) Isaac Lihadji
- (France) Arnaud Nordin
- (France) Dan-Axel Zagadou
- (Georgia (country)) Vato Arveladze
- (Georgia (country)) Giorgi Guliashvili
- (Georgia (country)) Beka Kavtaradze
- (Georgia (country)) Giorgi Kokhreidze
- (Georgia (country)) Giorgi Kutsia
- (Georgia (country)) Khvicha Kvaratskhelia
- (Georgia (country)) Anzor Mekvabishvili
- (Liechtenstein) Menderes Caglar
- (Slovakia) Ladislav Almási
- (Slovakia) Martin Gamboš
- (Slovakia) Jakub Kadák
- (Slovakia) Peter Kolesár
- (Slovakia) Ivan Mesík
- (Slovakia) Kristián Vallo
- (Switzerland) Nedim Bajrami
- (Switzerland) Kastriot Imeri
- (Switzerland) Jordan Lotomba
- (Switzerland) Petar Pusic
- (Switzerland) Silvan Sidler
- (Switzerland) Bastien Toma
- (Switzerland) Ruben Vargas

1 own goal

- (Georgia (country)) Ilia Beriashvili (against France)
- (Liechtenstein) Martin Marxer (against France)
- (Liechtenstein) Roman Spirig (against France)
- (Liechtenstein) Fabian Unterrainer (against Slovakia)
- (Slovakia) Lukáš Fabiš (against Georgia)
