= Germany national football team results (2020–present) =

This is a list of international football games played by the Germany national football team from 2020 to present.

== Results and fixtures ==
Win Draw Loss Fixture Void

=== 2020 ===
26 March 2020 Friendly	Spain	Cancelled	Germany	Madrid, Spain
20:45 UTC+1		Report		Stadium: Wanda Metropolitano
Note: The match was cancelled due to the COVID-19 pandemic in Europe.

31 March 2020 Friendly	Germany	Cancelled	Italy	Nuremberg, Germany
20:45 UTC+2		Report		Stadium: Max-Morlock-Stadion
Note: The match was cancelled due to the COVID-19 pandemic in Europe.

31 May 2020 Friendly	Switzerland	Cancelled	Germany	Basel, Switzerland
20:45 UTC+2		Report		Stadium: St. Jakob-Park
Note: The match was cancelled due to the COVID-19 pandemic in Europe.

3 September 2020 Nations League	Germany	1–1	Spain	Stuttgart, Germany
20:45 UTC+2	Werner 51'	Report	Gayà 90+6'	Stadium: Mercedes-Benz Arena; Attendance: 0 (Note: Due to the COVID-19 pandemic in Europe, all matches scheduled for September 2020 were played behind closed doors.); Referee: Daniele Orsato (Italy)

6 September 2020 Nations League	Switzerland	1–1	Germany	Basel, Switzerland
20:45 UTC+2	Widmer 58'	Report	Gündoğan 14'	Stadium: St. Jakob-Park; Attendance: 0 Referee: Michael Oliver (England)

7 October 2020 Friendly	Germany	3–3	Turkey	Cologne, Germany
20:45 UTC+2	Draxler 45+1'; Neuhaus 58'; Waldschmidt 81'	Report	Tufan 50'; Karaca 67'; Karaman 90+4'	Stadium: RheinEnergieStadion; Attendance: 0 (Note: Due to the COVID-19 pandemic in Europe, the match was played behind closed doors.); Referee: Benoît Bastien (France)

10 October 2020 Nations League	Ukraine	1–2	Germany	Kyiv, Ukraine
21:45 UTC+3	Malinovskyi 77' (pen.)	Report	Ginter 20'; Goretzka 49'	Stadium: NSC Olimpiyskiy Stadium; Attendance: 17,753; Referee: Orel Grinfeld (Israel)

13 October 2020 Nations League	Germany	3–3	Switzerland	Cologne, Germany
20:45 UTC+2	Werner 28'; Havertz 55'; Gnabry 60'	Report	Gavranović 5', 57'; Freuler 26'	Stadium: RheinEnergieStadion; Attendance: 0 (Note: Due to the COVID-19 pandemic in Europe, the match was played behind closed doors.); Referee: Ruddy Buquet (France)

11 November 2020 Friendly	Germany	1–0	Czech Republic	Leipzig, Germany
20:45 UTC+1	Waldschmidt 13'	Report		Stadium: Red Bull Arena; Attendance: 0 Referee: Andris Treimanis (Latvia)

14 November 2020 Nations League	Germany	3–1	Ukraine	Leipzig, Germany
20:45 UTC+1	Sané 23'; Werner 33', 64'	Report	Yaremchuk 12'	Stadium: Red Bull Arena; Attendance: 0 Referee: Ovidiu Hațegan (Romania)

17 November 2020 Nations League	Spain	6–0	Germany	Seville, Spain
20:45 UTC+1	Morata 17'; Torres 33', 55', 71'; Rodri 38'; Oyarzabal 89'	Report		Stadium: La Cartuja; Attendance: 0 Referee: Andreas Ekberg (Sweden)

=== 2021 ===
25 March 2021 2022 World Cup Q	Germany	3–0	Iceland	Duisburg, Germany
20:45 UTC+1	Goretzka 3'; Havertz 7'; Gündoğan 56'	Report (FIFA); Report (UEFA)		Stadium: MSV-Arena; Attendance: 0 Referee: Srđan Jovanović (Serbia)

28 March 2021 2022 World Cup Q	Romania	0–1	Germany	Bucharest, Romania
21:45 UTC+3		Report (FIFA); Report (UEFA)	Gnabry 17'	Stadium: Arena Națională; Attendance: 0 Referee: Clément Turpin (France)

31 March 2021 2022 World Cup Q	Germany	1–2	North Macedonia	Duisburg, Germany
20:45 UTC+2	Gündoğan 63' (pen.)	Report (FIFA); Report (UEFA)	Pandev 45+2'; Elmas 85'	Stadium: MSV-Arena; Attendance: 0 Referee: Sergei Karasev (Russia)

2 June 2021 Friendly	Germany	1–1	Denmark	Innsbruck, Austria
21:00 UTC+2	Neuhaus 48'	Report	Poulsen 71'	Stadium: Tivoli Stadion Tirol; Attendance: 0 Referee: Julian Weinberger (Austria)

7 June 2021 Friendly	Germany	7–1	Latvia	Düsseldorf, Germany
20:45 UTC+2	Gosens 19'; Gündoğan 21'; Müller 27'; Ozols 39' (o.g.); Gnabry 45'; Werner 50'; Sané 76'	Report	Saveljevs 75'	Stadium: Merkur Spiel-Arena; Attendance: 1,000; Referee: Nikola Dabanović (Montenegro)

15 June 2021 Euro 2020 Group F	France	1–0	Germany	Munich, Germany
21:00 UTC+2	Hummels 20' (o.g.)	Report		Stadium: Allianz Arena; Attendance: 13,000; Referee: Carlos del Cerro Grande (Spain)

19 June 2021 Euro 2020 Group F	Portugal	2–4	Germany	Munich, Germany
18:00 UTC+2	Ronaldo 15'; Jota 67'	Report	Dias 35' (o.g.); Guerreiro 39' (o.g.); Havertz 51'; Gosens 60'	Stadium: Allianz Arena; Attendance: 12,926; Referee: Anthony Taylor (England)

23 June 2021 Euro 2020 Group F	Germany	2–2	Hungary	Munich, Germany
21:00 UTC+2	Havertz 66'; Goretzka 84'	Report	Ád. Szalai 11'; Schäfer 68'	Stadium: Allianz Arena; Attendance: 12,413; Referee: Sergei Karasev (Russia)

29 June 2021 Euro 2020 Round of 16	England	2–0	Germany	London, England
18:00 UTC+1	Sterling 75'; Kane 86'	Report		Stadium: Wembley Stadium; Attendance: 41,973; Referee: Danny Makkelie (Netherlands)

2 September 2021 2022 World Cup Q	Liechtenstein	0–2	Germany	St. Gallen, Switzerland (Note: Liechtenstein played their home match against Germany at Kybunpark in St. Gallen, Switzerland, instead of their regular home stadium, the Rheinpark Stadion in Vaduz, which was being renovated.)
20:45 UTC+2		Report (FIFA); Report (UEFA)	Werner 41'; Sané 77'	Stadium: Kybunpark; Attendance: 7,958; Referee: Fábio Veríssimo (Portugal)

5 September 2021 2022 World Cup Q	Germany	6–0	Armenia	Stuttgart, Germany
20:45 UTC+2	Gnabry 6', 15'; Reus 35'; Werner 45'; Hofmann 52'; Adeyemi 90+1'	Report (FIFA); Report (UEFA)		Stadium: Mercedes-Benz Arena; Attendance: 18,086; Referee: William Collum (Scotland)

8 September 2021 2022 World Cup Q	Iceland	0–4	Germany	Reykjavík, Iceland
18:45 UTC+0		Report (FIFA); Report (UEFA)	Gnabry 4'; Rüdiger 24'; Sané 56'; Werner 89'	Stadium: Laugardalsvöllur; Attendance: 3,505; Referee: Andreas Ekberg (Sweden)

8 October 2021 2022 World Cup Q	Germany	2–1	Romania	Hamburg, Germany
20:45 UTC+2	Gnabry 52'; Müller 81'	Report (FIFA); Report (UEFA)	Hagi 9'	Stadium: Volksparkstadion; Attendance: 25,000; Referee: Cüneyt Çakır (Turkey)

11 October 2021 2022 World Cup Q	North Macedonia	0–4	Germany	Skopje, North Macedonia
20:45 UTC+2		Report (FIFA); Report (UEFA)	Havertz 50'; Werner 70', 73'; Musiala 83'	Stadium: Toše Proeski Arena; Attendance: 16,182; Referee: Danny Makkelie (Netherlands)

11 November 2021 2022 World Cup Q	Germany	9–0	Liechtenstein	Wolfsburg, Germany
20:45 UTC+1	Gündoğan 11' (pen.); Kaufmann 20' (o.g.); Sané 22', 49'; Reus 23'; Müller 76', 86'; Baku 80'; Göppel 89' (o.g.)	Report (FIFA); Report (UEFA)		Stadium: Volkswagen Arena; Attendance: 25,984; Referee: Ivana Martinčić (Croatia)

14 November 2021 2022 World Cup Q	Armenia	1–4	Germany	Yerevan, Armenia
21:00 UTC+4	Mkhitaryan 59' (pen.)	Report (FIFA); Report (UEFA)	Havertz 15'; Gündoğan 45+4' (pen.), 50'; Hofmann 64'	Stadium: Vazgen Sargsyan Republican Stadium; Attendance: 12,800; Referee: François Letexier (France)

=== 2022 ===
26 March 2022 Friendly	Germany	2–0	Israel	Sinsheim, Germany
20:45 UTC+1	Havertz 36'; Werner 45+1'	Report		Stadium: Rhein-Neckar-Arena; Attendance: 25,600; Referee: Maurizio Mariani (Italy)

29 March 2022 Friendly	Netherlands	1–1	Germany	Amsterdam, Netherlands
20:45 UTC+2	Bergwijn 68'	Report	Müller 45+1'	Stadium: Johan Cruyff Arena; Attendance: 50,387; Referee: Craig Pawson (England)

4 June 2022 Nations League	Italy	1–1	Germany	Bologna, Italy
20:45 UTC+2	Pellegrini 70'	Report	Kimmich 73'	Stadium: Stadio Renato Dall'Ara; Attendance: 23,754; Referee: Srđan Jovanović (Serbia)

7 June 2022 Nations League	Germany	1–1	England	Munich, Germany
20:45 UTC+2	Hofmann 50'	Report	Kane 88' (pen.)	Stadium: Allianz Arena; Attendance: 66,289; Referee: Carlos del Cerro Grande (Spain)

11 June 2022 Nations League	Hungary	1–1	Germany	Budapest, Hungary
20:45 UTC+2	Zs. Nagy 6'	Report	Hofmann 9'	Stadium: Puskás Aréna; Attendance: 55,948; Referee: José María Sánchez Martínez (Spain)

14 June 2022 Nations League	Germany	5–2	Italy	Mönchengladbach, Germany
20:45 UTC+2	Kimmich 10'; Gündoğan 45+4' (pen.); Müller 51'; Werner 68', 69'	Report	Gnonto 78'; Bastoni 90+4'	Stadium: Borussia-Park; Attendance: 44,144; Referee: István Kovács (Romania)

23 September 2022 Nations League	Germany	0–1	Hungary	Leipzig, Germany
20:45 UTC+2		Report	Szalai 17'	Stadium: Red Bull Arena; Attendance: 39,513; Referee: Slavko Vinčić (Slovenia)

26 September 2022 Nations League	England	3–3	Germany	London, England
20:45 UTC+2	Shaw 72'; Mount 75'; Kane 83' (pen.)	Report	Gündoğan 52' (pen.); Havertz 67', 87'	Stadium: Wembley Stadium; Attendance: 78,949; Referee: Danny Makkelie (Netherlands)

16 November 2022 Friendly	Oman	0–1	Germany	Muscat, Oman
18:00 UTC+1		Report	Füllkrug 80'	Stadium: Sultan Qaboos Sports Complex; Attendance: 25,654; Referee: Mohammed Al Hoaish (Saudi Arabia)

23 November 2022 2022 World Cup Group E	Germany	1–2	Japan	Al Rayyan, Qatar
14:00 UTC+1	Gündoğan 33' (pen.)	Report	Dōan 75'; Asano 83'	Stadium: Khalifa International Stadium; Attendance: 42,608; Referee: Iván Barton (El Salvador)

27 November 2022 2022 World Cup Group E	Spain	1–1	Germany	Al Khor, Qatar
20:00 UTC+1	Morata 62'	Report	Füllkrug 83'	Stadium: Al Bayt Stadium; Attendance: 68,895; Referee: Danny Makkelie (Netherlands)

1 December 2022 2022 World Cup Group E	Costa Rica	2–4	Germany	Al Khor, Qatar
20:00 UTC+1	Tejeda 58'; Vargas 70'	Report	Gnabry 10'; Havertz 73', 85'; Füllkrug 89'	Stadium: Al Bayt Stadium; Attendance: 67,054; Referee: Stéphanie Frappart (France)

=== 2023 ===
25 March 2023 Friendly	Germany	2–0	Peru	Mainz, Germany
20:45 UTC+1	Füllkrug 12', 33'	Report		Stadium: Mewa Arena; Attendance: 25,384; Referee: Maria Sole Ferrieri Caputi (Italy)

28 March 2023 Friendly	Germany	2–3	Belgium	Cologne, Germany
20:45 UTC+2	Füllkrug 44' (pen.); Gnabry 87'	Report	Carrasco 6'; Lukaku 9'; De Bruyne 78'	Stadium: RheinEnergieStadion; Attendance: 42,910; Referee: Willy Delajod (France)

12 June 2023 Friendly	Germany	3–3	Ukraine	Bremen, Germany
18:00 UTC+2	Füllkrug 6'; Havertz 83'; Kimmich 90+1' (pen.)	Report	Tsyhankov 19', 56'; Rüdiger 23' (o.g.)	Stadium: Weserstadion; Attendance: 35,795; Referee: Anastasios Sidiropoulos (Greece)

16 June 2023 Friendly	Poland	1–0	Germany	Warsaw, Poland
20:45 UTC+2	Kiwior 31'	Report		Stadium: Stadion Narodowy; Attendance: 57,098; Referee: Orel Grinfeld (Israel)

20 June 2023 Friendly	Germany	0–2	Colombia	Gelsenkirchen, Germany
20:45 UTC+2		Report	Díaz 54'; Cuadrado 82' (pen.)	Stadium: Arena AufSchalke; Attendance: 50,421; Referee: Halil Umut Meler (Turkey)

9 September 2023 Friendly	Germany	1–4	Japan	Wolfsburg, Germany
20:45 UTC+2	Sané 19'	Report	Ito 11'; Ueda 22'; Asano 90'; Tanaka 90+2'	Stadium: Volkswagen Arena; Attendance: 24,980; Referee: João Pinheiro (Portugal)

12 September 2023 Friendly	Germany	2–1	France	Dortmund, Germany
21:00 UTC+2	Müller 4'; Sané 87'	Report	Griezmann 89' (pen.)	Stadium: Westfalenstadion; Attendance: 60,486; Referee: Anthony Taylor (England)

14 October 2023 Friendly	United States	1–3	Germany	East Hartford, Connecticut, United States
15:00 UTC−4	Pulisic 27'	Report	Gündoğan 39'; Füllkrug 58'; Musiala 61'	Stadium: Pratt & Whitney Stadium; Attendance: 37,743; Referee: Fernando Guerrero (Mexico)

17 October 2023 Friendly	Mexico	2–2	Germany	Philadelphia, Pennsylvania, United States
20:00 UTC−4	Antuna 37'; Sánchez 47'	Report	Rüdiger 25'; Füllkrug 51'	Stadium: Lincoln Financial Field; Attendance: 62,284; Referee: Rubiel Vazquez (United States)

18 November 2023 Friendly	Germany	2–3	Turkey	Berlin, Germany
20:45 UTC+1	Havertz 5'; Füllkrug 48'	Report	Kadıoğlu 38'; Yıldız 45+2'; Sarı 70' (pen.)	Stadium: Olympiastadion; Attendance: 72,592; Referee: Bartosz Frankowski (Poland)

21 November 2023 Friendly	Austria	2–0	Germany	Vienna, Austria
20:45 UTC+1	Sabitzer 29'; Baumgartner 73'	Report		Stadium: Ernst-Happel-Stadion; Attendance: 46,000; Referee: Slavko Vinčić (Slovenia)

=== 2024 ===
23 March 2024 Friendly	France	0–2	Germany	Décines-Charpieu, France
21:00 UTC+1		Report	Wirtz 1'; Havertz 49'	Stadium: Parc Olympique Lyonnais; Attendance: 56,000; Referee: Jesús Gil Manzano (Spain)

26 March 2024 Friendly	Germany	2–1	Netherlands	Frankfurt, Germany
20:45 UTC+1	Mittelstädt 11'; Füllkrug 85'	Report	Veerman 4'	Stadium: Waldstadion; Attendance: 48,390; Referee: Espen Eskås (Norway)

3 June 2024 Friendly	Germany	0–0	Ukraine	Nuremberg, Germany
20:45 UTC+2		Report		Stadium: Max-Morlock-Stadion; Attendance: 42,789; Referee: Walter Altmann (Austria)

7 June 2024 Friendly	Germany	2–1	Greece	Mönchengladbach, Germany
20:45 UTC+2	Havertz 56'; Groß 89'	Report	Masouras 34'	Stadium: Borussia-Park; Attendance: 45,488; Referee: José Luis Munuera Montero (Spain)

14 June 2024 Euro 2024 Group A	Germany	5–1	Scotland	Munich, Germany
21:00 UTC+2	Wirtz 10'; Musiala 19'; Havertz 45+1' (pen.); Füllkrug 68'; Can 90+3'	Report	Rüdiger 87' (o.g.)	Stadium: Allianz Arena; Attendance: 65,052; Referee: Clément Turpin (France)

19 June 2024 Euro 2024 Group A	Germany	2–0	Hungary	Stuttgart, Germany
18:00 UTC+2	Musiala 22'; Gündoğan 67'	Report		Stadium: MHPArena; Attendance: 54,000; Referee: Danny Makkelie (Netherlands)

23 June 2024 Euro 2024 Group A	Switzerland	1–1	Germany	Frankfurt, Germany
21:00 UTC+2	Ndoye 28'	Report	Füllkrug 90+2'	Stadium: Waldstadion; Attendance: 46,685; Referee: Daniele Orsato (Italy)

29 June 2024 Euro 2024 Round of 16	Germany	2–0	Denmark	Dortmund, Germany
21:00 UTC+2	Havertz 53' (pen.); Musiala 68'	Report		Stadium: Westfalenstadion; Attendance: 61,612; Referee: Michael Oliver (England)

5 July 2024 Euro 2024 Quarter-finals	Spain	2–1 (a.e.t.)	Germany	Stuttgart, Germany
18:00 UTC+2	Olmo 51'; Merino 119'	Report	Wirtz 89'	Stadium: MHPArena; Attendance: 54,000; Referee: Anthony Taylor (England)

7 September 2024 Nations League	Germany	5–0	Hungary	Düsseldorf, Germany
20:45 UTC+2	Füllkrug 27'; Musiala 58'; Wirtz 66'; Pavlović 77'; Havertz 81' (pen.)	Report		Stadium: Merkur Spiel-Arena; Attendance: 49,235; Referee: Clément Turpin (France)

10 September 2024 Nations League	Netherlands	2–2	Germany	Amsterdam, Netherlands
20:45 UTC+2	Reijnders 2'; Dumfries 50'	Report	Undav 38'; Kimmich 45+3'	Stadium: Johan Cruyff Arena; Attendance: 50,109; Referee: Davide Massa (Italy)

11 October 2024 Nations League	Bosnia and Herzegovina	1–2	Germany	Zenica, Bosnia and Herzegovina
20:45 UTC+2	Džeko 70'	Report	Undav 30', 36'	Stadium: Stadion Bilino Polje; Attendance: 11,000; Referee: François Letexier (France)

14 October 2024 Nations League	Germany	1–0	Netherlands	Munich, Germany
20:45 UTC+2	Leweling 64'	Report		Stadium: Allianz Arena; Attendance: 68,367; Referee: Slavko Vinčić (Slovenia)

16 November 2024 Nations League	Germany	7–0	Bosnia and Herzegovina	Freiburg, Germany
20:45 UTC+1	Musiala 2'; Kleindienst 23', 79'; Havertz 37'; Wirtz 50', 57'; Sané 66'	Report		Stadium: Europa-Park Stadion; Attendance: 28,143; Referee: Vassilis Fotias (Greece)

19 November 2024 Nations League	Hungary	1–1	Germany	Budapest, Hungary
20:45 UTC+1	Szoboszlai 90+9' (pen.)	Report	Nmecha 76'	Stadium: Puskás Aréna; Attendance: 53,212; Referee: Duje Strukan (Croatia)

=== 2025 ===
20 March 2025 Nations League	Italy	1–2	Germany	Milan, Italy
20:45 CET (UTC+01:00)	Tonali 9'	Report	Kleindienst 49'; Goretzka 76'	Stadium: San Siro; Attendance: 60,334; Referee: François Letexier (France)

23 March 2025 Nations League	Germany	3–3 (5–4 agg.)	Italy	Dortmund, Germany
20:45 CET (UTC+01:00)	Kimmich 30' (pen.); Musiala 36'; Kleindiesnt 45'	Report	Kean 49', 69'; Raspadori 90+5' (pen.)	Stadium: Westfalenstadion; Attendance: 64,762; Referee: Szymon Marciniak (Poland)

4 June 2025 Nations League	Germany	1–2	Portugal	Munich, Germany
21:00 CEST (UTC+02:00)	Wirtz 48'	Report	Conceição 63'; Ronaldo 68'	Stadium: Allianz Arena; Attendance: 65,823; Referee: Slavko Vinčić

8 June 2025 Nations League	Germany	0–2	France	Stuttgart, Germany
15:00 CEST (UTC+02:00)		Report	Mbappé 45'; Olise 84'	Stadium: MHPArena; Attendance: 51,313; Referee: Ivan Kružliak (Slovakia)

4 September 2025 2026 World Cup Q	Slovakia	2–0	Germany	Bratislava, Slovakia
20:45 UTC+2	Hancko 42'; Strelec 55'	Report		Stadium: Tehelné pole Attendance: 20,013; Referee: Serdar Gözübüyük (Netherlands)

7 September 2025 2026 World Cup Q	Germany	3–1	Northern Ireland	Cologne, Germany
20:45 UTC+2	Gnabry 7'; Amiri 69'; Wirtz 72'	Report	Price 34'	Stadium: RheinEnergieStadion; Attendance: 43,169; Referee: Espen Eskås (Norway)

10 October 2025 2026 World Cup Q	Germany	4–0	Luxembourg	Sinsheim, Germany
20:45 UTC+2	Raum 12'; Kimmich 21' (pen.), 50'; Gnabry 48'	Report		Stadium: PreZero Arena; Attendance: 25,249; Referee: Nenad Minaković (Serbia)

13 October 2025 2026 World Cup Q	Northern Ireland	0–1	Germany	Belfast, Northern Ireland
20:45 UTC+2		Report	Woltemade 31'	Stadium: Windsor Park; Attendance: 17,926; Referee: Jesús Gil Manzano (Spain)

14 November 2025 2026 World Cup Q	Luxembourg	0–2	Germany	Luxembourg City, Luxembourg
20:45 UTC+1		Report	Woltemade 49', 69'	Stadium: Stade de Luxembourg; Attendance: 9,214; Referee: John Brooks (England)

17 November 2025 2026 World Cup Q	Germany	6–0	Slovakia	Leipzig, Germany
20:45 UTC+1	Woltemade 18'; Gnabry 29'; Sané 36', 41'; Baku 67'; Ouédraogo 79'	Report		Stadium: Red Bull Arena; Attendance: 40,120; Referee: François Letexier (France)

=== 2026 ===
27 March 2026 Friendly	Switzerland	3–4	Germany	Basel, Switzerland
20:45 UTC+1	Ndoye 17'; Embolo 41'; Monteiro 79'	Report	Tah 26'; Gnabry 45+2'; Wirtz 61', 85'	Stadium: St. Jakob-Park; Attendance: 34,316; Referee: Chris Kavanagh (England)

30 March 2026 Friendly	Germany	2–1	Ghana	Stuttgart, Germany
20:45 UTC+2	Havertz 45+3' (pen.); Undav 88'	Report	Fatawu 70'	Stadium: MHPArena; Attendance: 52,723; Referee: Stuart Attwell (England)

31 May 2026 Friendly	Germany	4–0	Finland	Mainz, Germany
20:45 UTC+2	Undav 34', 57'; Wirtz 48'; Musiala 63'	Report		Stadium: Mewa Arena; Attendance: 25,122; Referee: Matheus Candançan (Brazil)

6 June 2026 Friendly	United States	1–2	Germany	Chicago, Illinois, United States
13:30 UTC−5	Robinson 37'	Report	Havertz 2'; Sané 57'	Stadium: Soldier Field; Attendance: 63,636; Referee: Piero Maza (Chile)

14 June 2026 2026 World Cup Group E	Germany	7–1	Curaçao	Houston, United States
12:00 EST (UTC−05:00)	Nmecha 6'; Schlotterbeck 38'; Havertz 45+5' (pen.), 88'; Musiala 47'; Brown 68'; Undav 78'	Report	Comenencia 21'	Stadium: NRG Stadium, Houston; Attendance: 68,021; Referee: Jalal Jayed (Morocco)

20 June 2026 2026 World Cup Group E	Germany	2–1	Ivory Coast	Toronto, Canada
16:00 UTC−4	Undav 68', 90+4'	Report	Kessié 30'	Stadium: BMO Field; Attendance: 43,036; Referee: Juan Gabriel Benítez (Paraguay)

25 June 2026 2026 World Cup Group E	Ecuador	2–1	Germany	East Rutherford, New Jersey, United States
16:00 UTC−4	Angulo 9'; Plata 77'	Report	Sané 2'	Stadium: MetLife Stadium; Attendance: 80,663; Referee: Tori Penso (United States)

29 June 2026 2026 World Cup Round of 32	Germany	1–1 (a.e.t.) (3–4 p)	Paraguay	Foxborough, United States
16:30 UTC−4	Havertz 54'	Report	Enciso 42'	Stadium: Gillette Stadium; Attendance: 63,945; Referee: Jalal Jayed (Morocco)
	Penalties
	Havertz (penalty missed); Kimmich (penalty scored); Musiala (penalty scored); Woltemade (penalty missed); Amiri (penalty scored); Tah (penalty missed)		(penalty scored) Maurício; (penalty scored) G. Gómez; (penalty scored) Galarza; (penalty missed) Sanabria; (penalty missed) Balbuena; (penalty scored) Canale

24 September 2026 Nations League	Netherlands	1–1	Germany	Amsterdam, Netherlands
20:45 UTC+2	Gakpo 90+2'	Report	Nmecha 32'	Stadium: Johan Cruyff Arena; Attendance: 51,437; Referee: Alejandro Hernández Hernández (Spain)

27 September 2026 Nations League	Germany	0–1	Greece	Augsburg, Germany
20:45 UTC+2		Report	Kourbelis 74'	Stadium: Augsburg Arena; Attendance: 28,945; Referee: Chris Kavanagh (England)

1 October 2026 Nations League	Germany	2–0	Serbia	Munich, Germany
20:45 UTC+2	Bischof 39'; Wirtz 61'	Report		Stadium: Allianz Arena; Attendance: 68,121; Referee: Espen Eskås (Norway)

4 October 2026 Nations League	Greece	0–0	Germany	Thessaloniki, Greece
20:45 UTC+2		Report		Stadium: Toumba Stadium; Attendance: 27,599; Referee: Clément Turpin (France)

13 November 2026 Nations League	Serbia	1–3	Germany	Belgrade, Serbia
20:45 UTC+1	Babić 56'	Report	Babić 3' (o.g.); Wirtz 14'; Gruda 50'	Stadium: Rajko Mitić Stadium; Attendance: 2,962; Referee: Javier Alberola Rojas (Spain)

16 November 2026 Nations League	Germany	5–0	Netherlands	Berlin, Germany
20:45 UTC+1	Scherhant 41'; Wirtz 60', 71'; Schlotterbeck 65'; Gruda 77'	Report		Stadium: Olympiastadion; Attendance: 71,765; Referee: Glenn Nyberg (Sweden)

=== 2027 ===
25 March 2027 Nations League	Belgium	v	Germany	Belgium
20:45 UTC+1		Report

28 March 2027 Nations League	Germany	v	Belgium	Germany
20:45 UTC+2		Report
