= 2022 FIFA World Cup qualification – UEFA Group J =

The 2022 FIFA World Cup qualification UEFA Group J was one of the ten UEFA groups in the World Cup qualification tournament to decide which teams would qualify for the 2022 FIFA World Cup finals tournament in Qatar. Group J consisted of six teams: Armenia, Germany, Iceland, Liechtenstein, North Macedonia, and Romania. The teams played against each other home-and-away in a round-robin format.

The group winners, Germany, qualified directly for the World Cup finals, while the runners-up, North Macedonia, advanced to the second round (play-offs).

== Standings ==
Pos	Team	Pld	W	D	L	GF	GA	GD	Pts	Qualification	Germany	North Macedonia	Romania	Armenia	Iceland	Liechtenstein
1	Germany	10	9	0	1	36	4	+32	27	Qualification for 2022 FIFA World Cup	—	1–2	2–1	6–0	3–0	9–0
2	North Macedonia	10	5	3	2	23	11	+12	18	Advance to play-offs	0–4	—	0–0	0–0	3–1	5–0
3	Romania	10	5	2	3	13	8	+5	17		0–1	3–2	—	1–0	0–0	2–0
4	Armenia	10	3	3	4	9	20	−11	12		1–4	0–5	3–2	—	2–0	1–1
5	Iceland	10	2	3	5	12	18	−6	9		0–4	2–2	0–2	1–1	—	4–0
6	Liechtenstein	10	0	1	9	2	34	−32	1		0–2	0–4	0–2	0–1	1–4	—

Source: FIFA, UEFA
Rules for classification: Tiebreakers

== Matches ==
The fixture list was confirmed by UEFA on 8 December 2020, the day following the draw. Times are CET/CEST, (Note: CET (UTC+1) for matches until 27 March and from 31 October (matchday 1 and 9–10), and CEST (UTC+2) for matches from 28 March to 30 October 2021 (matchday 2–8).) as listed by UEFA (local times, if different, are in parentheses).

25 March 2021
20:45

Germany	3–0	Iceland
Goretzka 3'; Havertz 7'; Gündoğan 56'	Report (FIFA); Report (UEFA)

MSV-Arena, Duisburg
Attendance: 0 (Note: Due to the COVID-19 pandemic in Europe, the match was played behind closed doors.)
Referee: Srđan Jovanović (Serbia)
25 March 2021
20:45

Liechtenstein	0–1	Armenia
	Report (FIFA); Report (UEFA)	Frommelt 83' (o.g.)

Rheinpark Stadion, Vaduz
Attendance: 0
Referee: Julian Weinberger (Austria)
25 March 2021
20:45 (21:45 UTC+2)

Romania	3–2	North Macedonia
Tănase 28'; Mihăilă 50'; Hagi 86'	Report (FIFA); Report (UEFA)	Ademi 82'; Trajkovski 83'

Arena Națională, Bucharest
Attendance: 0
Referee: Fábio Veríssimo (Portugal)

28 March 2021
18:00 (20:00 UTC+4)

Armenia	2–0	Iceland
Barseghyan 53'; Bayramyan 74'	Report (FIFA); Report (UEFA)

Vazgen Sargsyan Republican Stadium, Yerevan
Attendance: 4,300
Referee: Enea Jorgji (Albania)
28 March 2021
20:45

North Macedonia	5–0	Liechtenstein
Bardhi 7'; Trajkovski 51', 54'; Elmas 62'; Nestorovski 82' (pen.)	Report (FIFA); Report (UEFA)

Toše Proeski Arena, Skopje
Attendance: 0
Referee: Mykola Balakin (Ukraine)
28 March 2021
20:45 (21:45 UTC+3)

Romania	0–1	Germany
	Report (FIFA); Report (UEFA)	Gnabry 17'

Arena Națională, Bucharest
Attendance: 0
Referee: Clément Turpin (France)

31 March 2021
18:00 (20:00 UTC+4)

Armenia	3–2	Romania
Spertsyan 56'; Haroyan 87'; Barseghyan 89' (pen.)	Report (FIFA); Report (UEFA)	Cicâldău 62', 72'

Vazgen Sargsyan Republican Stadium, Yerevan
Attendance: 4,300
Referee: Andris Treimanis (Latvia)
31 March 2021
20:45

Germany	1–2	North Macedonia
Gündoğan 63' (pen.)	Report (FIFA); Report (UEFA)	Pandev 45+2'; Elmas 85'

MSV-Arena, Duisburg
Attendance: 0
Referee: Sergei Karasev (Russia)
31 March 2021
20:45

Liechtenstein	1–4	Iceland
Y. Frick 79'	Report (FIFA); Report (UEFA)	Sævarsson 12'; Bi. Bjarnason 45+1'; Pálsson 77'; Sigurjónsson 90+4' (pen.)

Rheinpark Stadion, Vaduz
Attendance: 0
Referee: Mohammed Al-Hakim (Sweden)

2 September 2021
20:45 (18:45 UTC±0)

Iceland	0–2	Romania
	Report (FIFA); Report (UEFA)	Man 47'; Stanciu 83'

Laugardalsvöllur, Reykjavík
Attendance: 1,961
Referee: Aleksei Kulbakov (Belarus)
2 September 2021
20:45

Liechtenstein	0–2	Germany
	Report (FIFA); Report (UEFA)	Werner 41'; Sané 77'

Kybunpark, St. Gallen (Switzerland) (Note: Liechtenstein played their home match against Germany at Kybunpark in St. Gallen, Switzerland, instead of their regular home stadium, the Rheinpark Stadion in Vaduz, which was being renovated.)
Attendance: 7,958
Referee: Fábio Veríssimo (Portugal)
2 September 2021
20:45

North Macedonia	0–0	Armenia
	Report (FIFA); Report (UEFA)

Toše Proeski Arena, Skopje
Attendance: 3,147
Referee: Artur Soares Dias (Portugal)

5 September 2021
18:00 (16:00 UTC±0)

Iceland	2–2	North Macedonia
Br. Bjarnason 78'; Guðjohnsen 84'	Report (FIFA); Report (UEFA)	Velkovski 12'; Alioski 54'

Laugardalsvöllur, Reykjavík
Attendance: 1,862
Referee: Ivan Kružliak (Slovakia)
5 September 2021
20:45

Germany	6–0	Armenia
Gnabry 6', 15'; Reus 35'; Werner 45'; Hofmann 52'; Adeyemi 90+1'	Report (FIFA); Report (UEFA)

Mercedes-Benz Arena, Stuttgart
Attendance: 18,086
Referee: William Collum (Scotland)
5 September 2021
20:45 (21:45 UTC+3)

Romania	2–0	Liechtenstein
Toșca 11'; Manea 18'	Report (FIFA); Report (UEFA)

Arena Națională, Bucharest
Attendance: 9,404
Referee: Kateryna Monzul (Ukraine)

8 September 2021
18:00 (20:00 UTC+4)

Armenia	1–1	Liechtenstein
Mkhitaryan 45+5' (pen.)	Report (FIFA); Report (UEFA)	N. Frick 80'

Vazgen Sargsyan Republican Stadium, Yerevan
Attendance: 14,400
Referee: Duje Strukan (Croatia)
8 September 2021
20:45 (18:45 UTC±0)

Iceland	0–4	Germany
	Report (FIFA); Report (UEFA)	Gnabry 4'; Rüdiger 24'; Sané 56'; Werner 89'

Laugardalsvöllur, Reykjavík
Attendance: 3,505
Referee: Andreas Ekberg (Sweden)
8 September 2021
20:45

North Macedonia	0–0	Romania
	Report (FIFA); Report (UEFA)

Toše Proeski Arena, Skopje
Attendance: 5,260
Referee: Antonio Mateu Lahoz (Spain)

8 October 2021
20:45

Germany	2–1	Romania
Gnabry 52'; Müller 81'	Report (FIFA); Report (UEFA)	Hagi 9'

Volksparkstadion, Hamburg
Attendance: 25,000
Referee: Cüneyt Çakır (Turkey)
8 October 2021
20:45 (18:45 UTC±0)

Iceland	1–1	Armenia
Jóhannesson 77'	Report (FIFA); Report (UEFA)	Hovhannisyan 35'

Laugardalsvöllur, Reykjavík
Attendance: 1,697
Referee: Nikola Dabanović (Montenegro)
8 October 2021
20:45

Liechtenstein	0–4	North Macedonia
	Report (FIFA); Report (UEFA)	Velkovski 39'; Alioski 66' (pen.); Nikolov 74'; Churlinov 83'

Rheinpark Stadion, Vaduz
Attendance: 1,628
Referee: Bartosz Frankowski (Poland)

11 October 2021
20:45 (18:45 UTC±0)

Iceland	4–0	Liechtenstein
Þórðarson 19'; Guðmundsson 35' (pen.), 79' (pen.); Guðjohnsen 89'	Report (FIFA); Report (UEFA)

Laugardalsvöllur, Reykjavík
Attendance: 4,461
Referee: Ioannis Papadopoulos (Greece)
11 October 2021
20:45

North Macedonia	0–4	Germany
	Report (FIFA); Report (UEFA)	Havertz 50'; Werner 70', 73'; Musiala 83'

Toše Proeski Arena, Skopje
Attendance: 16,182
Referee: Danny Makkelie (Netherlands)
11 October 2021
20:45 (21:45 UTC+3)

Romania	1–0	Armenia
Mitriță 26'	Report (FIFA); Report (UEFA)

Stadionul Steaua, Bucharest
Attendance: 13,576
Referee: Daniele Orsato (Italy)

11 November 2021
18:00 (21:00 UTC+4)

Armenia	0–5	North Macedonia
	Report (FIFA); Report (UEFA)	Trajkovski 22'; Bardhi 36', 67' (pen.), 90' (pen.); Ristovski 79'

Vazgen Sargsyan Republican Stadium, Yerevan
Attendance: 7,200
Referee: José María Sánchez Martínez (Spain)
11 November 2021
20:45

Germany	9–0	Liechtenstein
Gündoğan 11' (pen.); Kaufmann 20' (o.g.); Sané 22', 49'; Reus 23'; Müller 76', 86'; Baku 80'; Göppel 89' (o.g.)	Report (FIFA); Report (UEFA)

Volkswagen Arena, Wolfsburg
Attendance: 25,984
Referee: Ivana Martinčić (Croatia)
11 November 2021
20:45 (21:45 UTC+2)

Romania	0–0	Iceland
	Report (FIFA); Report (UEFA)

Stadionul Steaua, Bucharest
Attendance: 0
Referee: Sergei Karasev (Russia)

14 November 2021
18:00 (21:00 UTC+4)

Armenia	1–4	Germany
Mkhitaryan 59' (pen.)	Report (FIFA); Report (UEFA)	Havertz 15'; Gündoğan 45+4' (pen.), 50'; Hofmann 64'

Vazgen Sargsyan Republican Stadium, Yerevan
Attendance: 12,800
Referee: François Letexier (France)
14 November 2021
18:00

Liechtenstein	0–2	Romania
	Report (FIFA); Report (UEFA)	Man 8'; Bancu 87'

Rheinpark Stadion, Vaduz
Attendance: 2,237
Referee: Matej Jug (Slovenia)
14 November 2021
18:00

North Macedonia	3–1	Iceland
Alioski 7'; Elmas 65', 86'	Report (FIFA); Report (UEFA)	Þorsteinsson 54'

Toše Proeski Arena, Skopje
Attendance: 15,986
Referee: Davide Massa (Italy)

== Goalscorers ==
There were 95 goals scored in 30 matches, for an average of 3.17 goals per match.

5 goals

- (Germany) Serge Gnabry
- (Germany) İlkay Gündoğan
- (Germany) Timo Werner

4 goals

- (Germany) Leroy Sané
- (North Macedonia) Enis Bardhi
- (North Macedonia) Elif Elmas
- (North Macedonia) Aleksandar Trajkovski

3 goals

- (Germany) Kai Havertz
- (Germany) Thomas Müller
- (North Macedonia) Ezgjan Alioski

2 goals

- (Armenia) Tigran Barseghyan
- (Armenia) Henrikh Mkhitaryan
- (Germany) Jonas Hofmann
- (Germany) Marco Reus
- (Iceland) Andri Guðjohnsen
- (Iceland) Albert Guðmundsson
- (North Macedonia) Darko Velkovski
- (Romania) Alexandru Cicâldău
- (Romania) Ianis Hagi
- (Romania) Dennis Man

1 goal

- (Armenia) Khoren Bayramyan
- (Armenia) Varazdat Haroyan
- (Armenia) Kamo Hovhannisyan
- (Armenia) Eduard Spertsyan
- (Germany) Karim Adeyemi
- (Germany) Ridle Baku
- (Germany) Leon Goretzka
- (Germany) Jamal Musiala
- (Germany) Antonio Rüdiger
- (Iceland) Birkir Bjarnason
- (Iceland) Brynjar Ingi Bjarnason
- (Iceland) Ísak Bergmann Jóhannesson
- (Iceland) Victor Pálsson
- (Iceland) Birkir Már Sævarsson
- (Iceland) Rúnar Már Sigurjónsson
- (Iceland) Stefán Teitur Þórðarson
- (Iceland) Jón Dagur Þorsteinsson
- (Liechtenstein) Noah Frick
- (Liechtenstein) Yanik Frick
- (North Macedonia) Arijan Ademi
- (North Macedonia) Darko Churlinov
- (North Macedonia) Ilija Nestorovski
- (North Macedonia) Boban Nikolov
- (North Macedonia) Goran Pandev
- (North Macedonia) Milan Ristovski
- (Romania) Nicușor Bancu
- (Romania) Cristian Manea
- (Romania) Valentin Mihăilă
- (Romania) Alexandru Mitriță
- (Romania) Nicolae Stanciu
- (Romania) Florin Tănase
- (Romania) Alin Toșca

1 own goal

- (Liechtenstein) Noah Frommelt (against Armenia)
- (Liechtenstein) Maximilian Göppel (against Germany)
- (Liechtenstein) Daniel Kaufmann (against Germany)

== Discipline ==
A player was automatically suspended for the next match for the following offences:

- Receiving a red card (red card suspensions could be extended for serious offences)
- Receiving two yellow cards in two different matches (yellow card suspensions were carried forward to the play-offs, but not the finals or any other future international matches)

The following suspensions were served during the qualifying matches:

Team	Player	Offence(s)	Suspended for match(es)
Armenia	Sargis Adamyan	(yellow card) vs Liechtenstein (25 March 2021); (yellow card) vs Romania (11 October 2021)	vs North Macedonia (11 November 2021)
Armenia	Tigran Barseghyan	(yellow card) vs Iceland (28 March 2021); (yellow card) vs Romania (31 March 2021)	vs North Macedonia (2 September 2021)
Armenia	Khoren Bayramyan	(yellow card) vs Liechtenstein (25 March 2021); (yellow card) vs Romania (31 March 2021)	vs North Macedonia (2 September 2021)
Armenia	Varazdat Haroyan	(yellow card) vs Iceland (28 March 2021); (yellow card) vs Romania (31 March 2021)	vs North Macedonia (2 September 2021)
Armenia	Varazdat Haroyan	(yellow card) vs Germany (5 September 2021); (yellow card) vs Romania (11 October 2021)	vs North Macedonia (11 November 2021)
Armenia	Eduard Spertsyan	(yellow card) vs Iceland (8 October 2021); (yellow card) vs Romania (11 October 2021)	vs North Macedonia (11 November 2021)
Armenia	Taron Voskanyan	(yellow card) vs North Macedonia (2 September 2021); (yellow card) vs Romania (11 October 2021)	vs North Macedonia (11 November 2021)
Germany	Kai Havertz	(yellow card) vs Iceland (25 March 2021); (yellow card) vs North Macedonia (11 October 2021)	vs Liechtenstein (11 November 2021)
Germany	Antonio Rüdiger	(yellow card) vs North Macedonia (31 March 2021); (yellow card) vs Liechtenstein (11 November 2021)	vs Armenia (14 November 2021)
Iceland	Albert Guðmundsson	(yellow card) vs Germany (25 March 2021); (yellow card) vs Armenia (28 March 2021)	vs Liechtenstein (31 March 2021)
Iceland	Ísak Bergmann Jóhannesson	(yellow card) vs Romania (2 September 2021); (yellow card) vs Armenia (8 October 2021)	vs Liechtenstein (11 October 2021)
Iceland	Birkir Már Sævarsson	(yellow card) (yellow-red card) vs England in 2020–21 UEFA Nations League (18 November 2020)	vs Germany (25 March 2021)
Iceland	Birkir Már Sævarsson	(yellow card) vs North Macedonia (5 September 2021); (yellow card) vs Armenia (8 October 2021)	vs Liechtenstein (11 October 2021)
Iceland	Ari Freyr Skúlason	(yellow card) vs Armenia (28 March 2021); (yellow card) vs Armenia (8 October 2021)	vs Liechtenstein (11 October 2021)
Liechtenstein	Noah Frommelt	(yellow card) vs North Macedonia (28 March 2021); (yellow card) vs Armenia (8 September 2021)	vs North Macedonia (8 October 2021)
Liechtenstein	Jens Hofer	(red card) vs Germany (11 November 2021)	vs Romania (14 November 2021)
Liechtenstein	Daniel Kaufmann	(yellow card) vs Armenia (8 September 2021); (yellow card) vs North Macedonia (8 October 2021)	vs Iceland (11 October 2021)
Liechtenstein	Martin Marxer	(yellow card) (yellow-red card) vs Iceland (11 October 2021)	vs Germany (11 November 2021)
Liechtenstein	Fabio Wolfinger	(yellow card) vs North Macedonia (28 March 2021); (yellow card) vs North Macedonia (8 October 2021)	vs Iceland (11 October 2021)
North Macedonia	Tihomir Kostadinov	(yellow card) vs Armenia (2 September 2021); (yellow card) vs Romania (8 September 2021)	vs Liechtenstein (8 October 2021)
North Macedonia	Visar Musliu	(yellow card) vs Armenia (2 September 2021); (yellow card) vs Romania (8 September 2021)	vs Liechtenstein (8 October 2021)
North Macedonia	Goran Pandev	(yellow card) vs Romania (25 March 2021); (yellow card) vs Germany (31 March 2021)	vs Armenia (2 September 2021)
North Macedonia	Milan Ristovski	(yellow card) vs Romania (8 September 2021); (yellow card) vs Liechtenstein (8 October 2021)	vs Germany (11 October 2021)
North Macedonia	Stefan Ristovski	(yellow card) vs Iceland (5 September 2021); (yellow card) vs Germany (11 October 2021)	vs Armenia (11 November 2021)
Romania	Nicușor Bancu	(yellow card) vs North Macedonia (25 March 2021); (yellow card) vs Armenia (31 March 2021)	vs Iceland (2 September 2021)
Romania	Alexandru Maxim	(yellow card) vs North Macedonia (25 March 2021); (yellow card) vs Armenia (31 March 2021)	vs Iceland (2 September 2021)
Romania	Valentin Mihăilă	(yellow card) vs North Macedonia (25 March 2021); (yellow card) vs Armenia (11 October 2021)	vs Iceland (11 November 2021)
Romania	Dragoș Nedelcu	(yellow card) vs Iceland (2 September 2021); (yellow card) vs North Macedonia (8 September 2021)	vs Germany (8 October 2021)
Romania	George Pușcaș	(red card) vs Armenia (31 March 2021)	vs Iceland (2 September 2021) vs Liechtenstein (5 September 2021)
Romania	George Pușcaș	(yellow card) vs Armenia (31 March 2021); (yellow card) vs Germany (8 October 2021)	vs Armenia (11 October 2021)
Romania	Andrei Rațiu	(yellow card) vs Germany (8 October 2021); (yellow card) vs Iceland (11 November 2021)	vs Liechtenstein (14 November 2021)
