= Khvicha Kvaratskhelia =

Georgian footballer (born 2001)

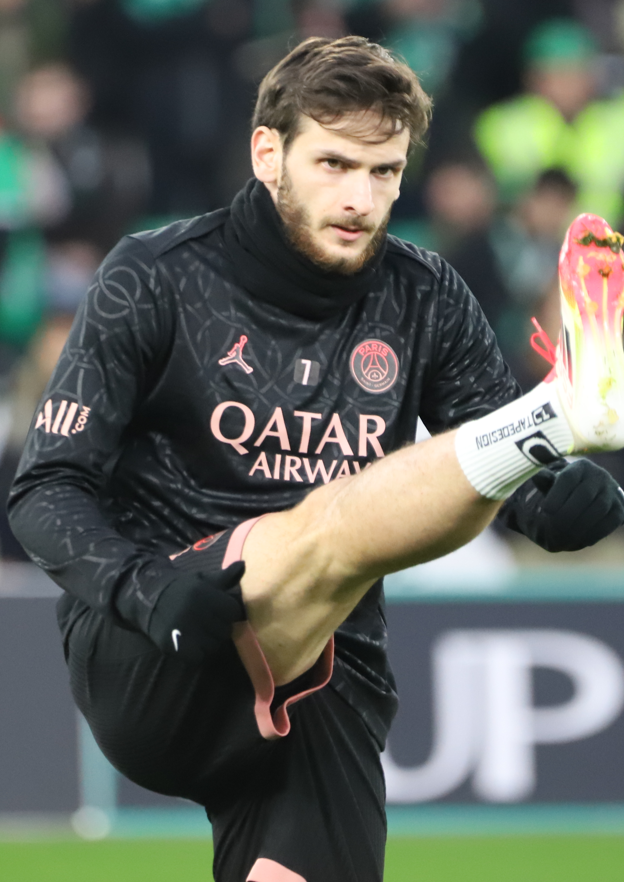
- Kvaratskhelia with Paris Saint-Germain in 2025

Personal information
- Full name: Khvicha Kvaratskhelia
- Date of birth: 12 February 2001 (age 25)
- Place of birth: Tbilisi, Georgia
- Height: 1.83 m (6 ft 0 in)
- Position: Left winger

Team information
- Current team: Paris Saint-Germain
- Number: 7

Youth career
- 2012–2017: Dinamo Tbilisi

Senior career*
Years	Team	Apps	(Gls)
2017–2018	Dinamo Tbilisi	4	(1)
2018–2019	Rustavi	18	(3)
2019	→ Lokomotiv Moscow (loan)	7	(1)
2019–2022	Rubin Kazan	69	(9)
2022	Dinamo Batumi	11	(8)
2022–2025	Napoli	85	(28)
2025–	Paris Saint-Germain	49	(13)

International career^{‡}
2016–2018	Georgia U17	28	(15)
2018	Georgia U18	1	(1)
2017–2019	Georgia U19	9	(3)
2019	Georgia U21	2	(1)
2019–	Georgia	54	(23)
- * Club domestic league appearances and goals as of 16:30, 17 October 2026 (UTC) ‡ National team caps and goals as of 20:40, 5 October 2026 (UTC)

Khvicha Kvaratskhelia (Order of Honor) (Georgian: ხვიჩა კვარაცხელია; pronounced ['χʷitʃʰa kʼʷara'tsʰχelia]; born 12 February 2001) is a Georgian professional footballer who plays as a left winger for Ligue 1 club Paris Saint-Germain and captains the Georgia national team. He is regarded as one of the best players in the world and the best Georgian player of all time.

Kvaratskhelia started his senior career playing for Dinamo Tbilisi at age 16, before departing to Rustavi where he spent half a season. During his combined three-year tenure at Lokomotiv Moscow and Rubin Kazan, Kvaratskhelia won two consecutive Russian Premier League Best Young Player awards.

Following a short spell at Dinamo Batumi, Kvaratskhelia signed for Italian side Napoli in 2022, and in his debut season, he helped the club win their first Serie A title since 1990, being named Serie A's Most Valuable Player and the Champions League's Young Player of the Season. He joined French side Paris Saint-Germain for €70 million in January 2025. He immediately became a focal player, as the club won a continental treble in his first season there, scoring in the Champions League final. He won a second Champions League title the following season and was named the tournament's best player.

Kvaratskhelia established himself for Georgia in all national youth teams, becoming a key player under different managers. He then became an integral part of the senior team after making his debut in 2019, and helped Georgia qualify for UEFA Euro 2024, the country's first ever major international tournament.

== Club career ==
=== Early career ===
Coming through the youth system, Kvaratskhelia began his senior career at Dinamo Tbilisi in 2017, making his senior debut against Kolkheti-1913, coming on as a 62nd-minute substitute in a 1–1 draw on 29 September 2017. In total, Kvaratskhelia made five appearances in all competitions for Dinamo Tbilisi, scoring his first goal in a 1–0 win away to Shukura Kobuleti on 19 November 2017.

In March 2018, Kvaratskhelia left Dinamo Tbilisi as a result of a contract dispute and subsequently signed for Rustavi on a free transfer. In April 2018, Kvaratskhelia was the subject of interest from German champions Bayern Munich and was in attendance for Bayern's 0–0 draw against Sevilla in the UEFA Champions League quarter-final. During the 2018 Erovnuli Liga season, Kvaratskhelia scored three goals across 18 appearances for Rustavi.

In 2018, The Guardian named Kvaratskhelia among 60 best young players worldwide.

=== Lokomotiv Moscow ===
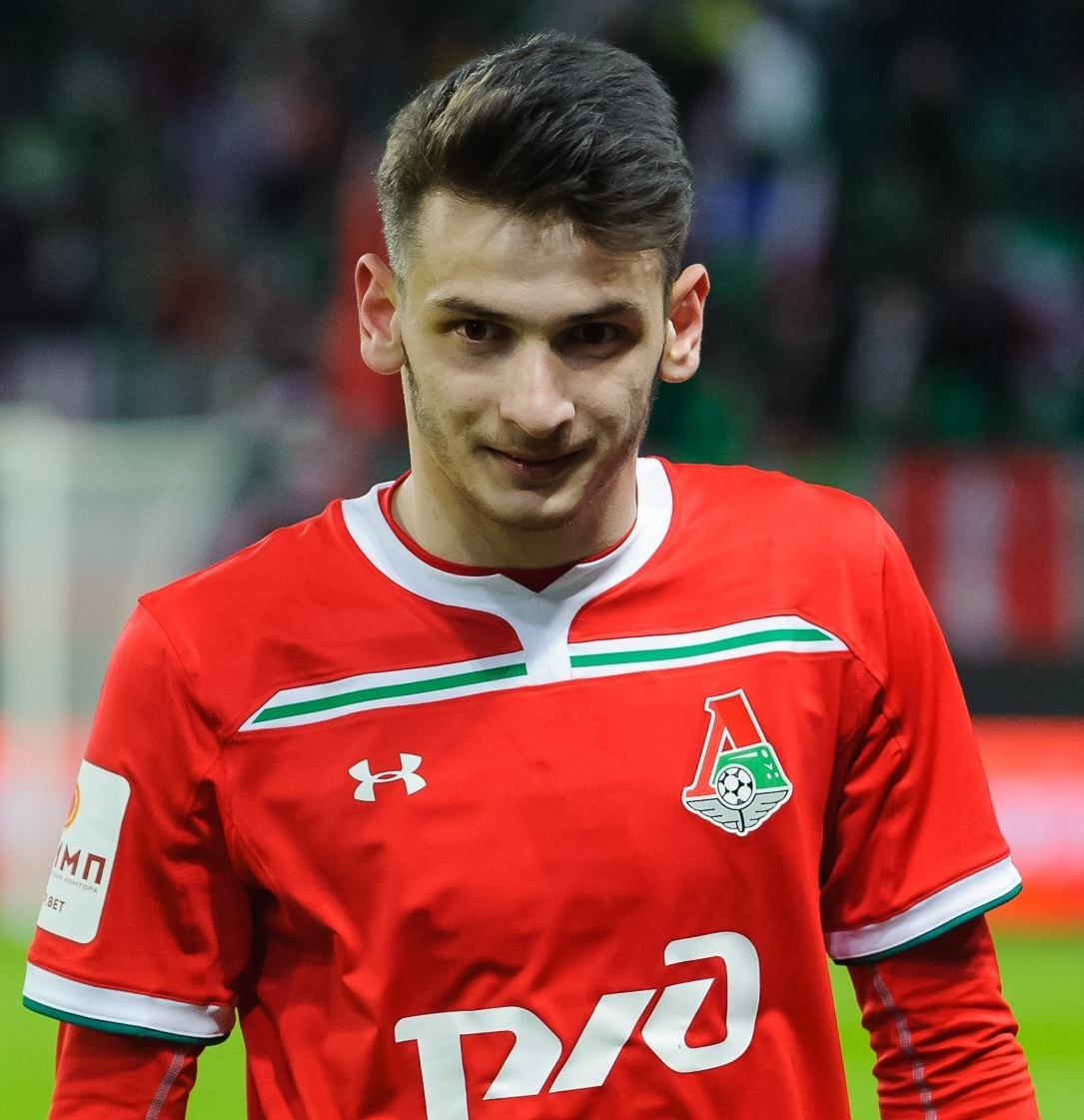
Kvaratskhelia with Lokomotiv Moscow in 2019

On 15 February 2019, Kvaratskhelia joined Russian Premier League (RPL) club Lokomotiv Moscow on loan. He made his league debut on 10 March as an 86th-minute substitute for Jefferson Farfán against Anzhi Makhachkala. On 1 July, Lokomotiv Moscow announced that Kvaratskhelia had left the club after his loan expired. Following the loss of Kvaratskhelia, Lokomotiv Moscow manager Yuri Semin said he was very disappointed after failing to agree on a permanent transfer with Kvaratskhelia as Semin considered him extremely talented.

=== Rubin Kazan ===
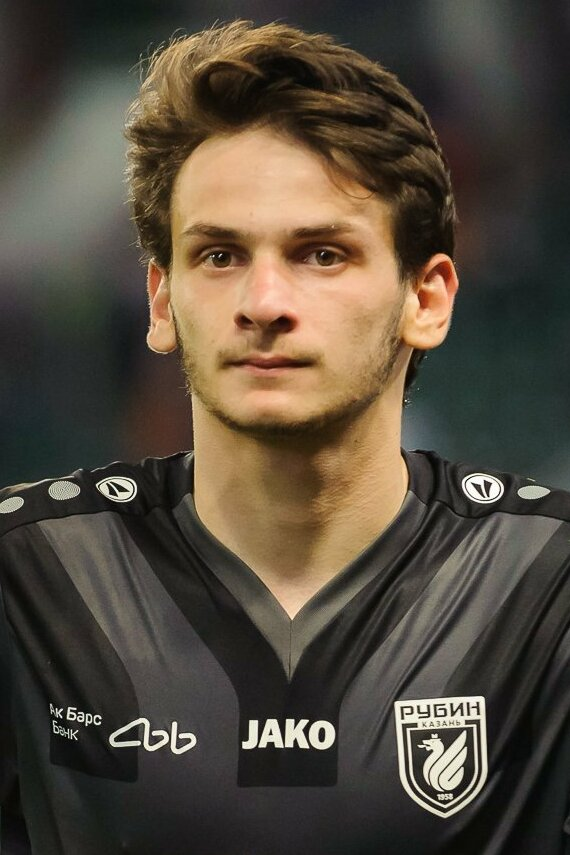
Kvaratskhelia with Rubin Kazan in 2019

On 6 July 2019, Kvaratskhelia signed a five-year deal with Rubin Kazan. He played his first game on 15 July against his previous club Lokomotiv, coming on as a substitute in the second half and scoring the equalizer in a 1–1 draw. Kvaratskhelia was named as best player of the match by Rubin fans on the official site of the club.

Overall, his purchase was hailed by several Russian media outlets as the main transfer success for Rubin, who saw the player's market value increased five times in a single season between June 2019 and June 2020. Based on the votes among Rubin supporters, Kvaratskhelia won Player of the Month nomination four times in 2020–21, namely in August, September, October and April.

In early 2021, L'Équipe published a list of 50 best players born in the 21st century, with Kvaratskhelia being the only RPL player to be included.

=== Dinamo Batumi ===
On 7 March 2022, FIFA announced that, due to the Russian invasion of Ukraine, foreign players in Russia could unilaterally suspend their contracts until 30 June, and were allowed to sign with clubs outside of Russia until the same date. On 24 March 2022, Rubin Kazan announced that Kvaratskhelia's contract had been suspended. On the same day, he joined Dinamo Batumi of Georgia.

Kvaratskhelia took part in 11 league matches with Dinamo Batumi, scoring eight times and providing two assists. Erovnuli Liga named him the best player of the second round of the season, which coincided with the period between April and July.

=== Napoli ===
On 1 July 2022, Serie A side Napoli confirmed the signing of Kvaratskhelia on a deal lasting until 2027 from Dinamo Batumi for a reported fee of €10–12 million. Kvaratskhelia's debut for the club came on 15 August, in the first matchday of Serie A against Hellas Verona; he scored and assisted in a 5–2 victory. He scored twice in the following matchday against Monza on 21 August, netting his first Serie A brace in a 4–0 win. Following these games, Kvaratskhelia topped the Serie A top scorer list, becoming the first player in Napoli's history to score three goals in the two opening league matches. Further, he was named Serie A Player of the Month in August 2022.

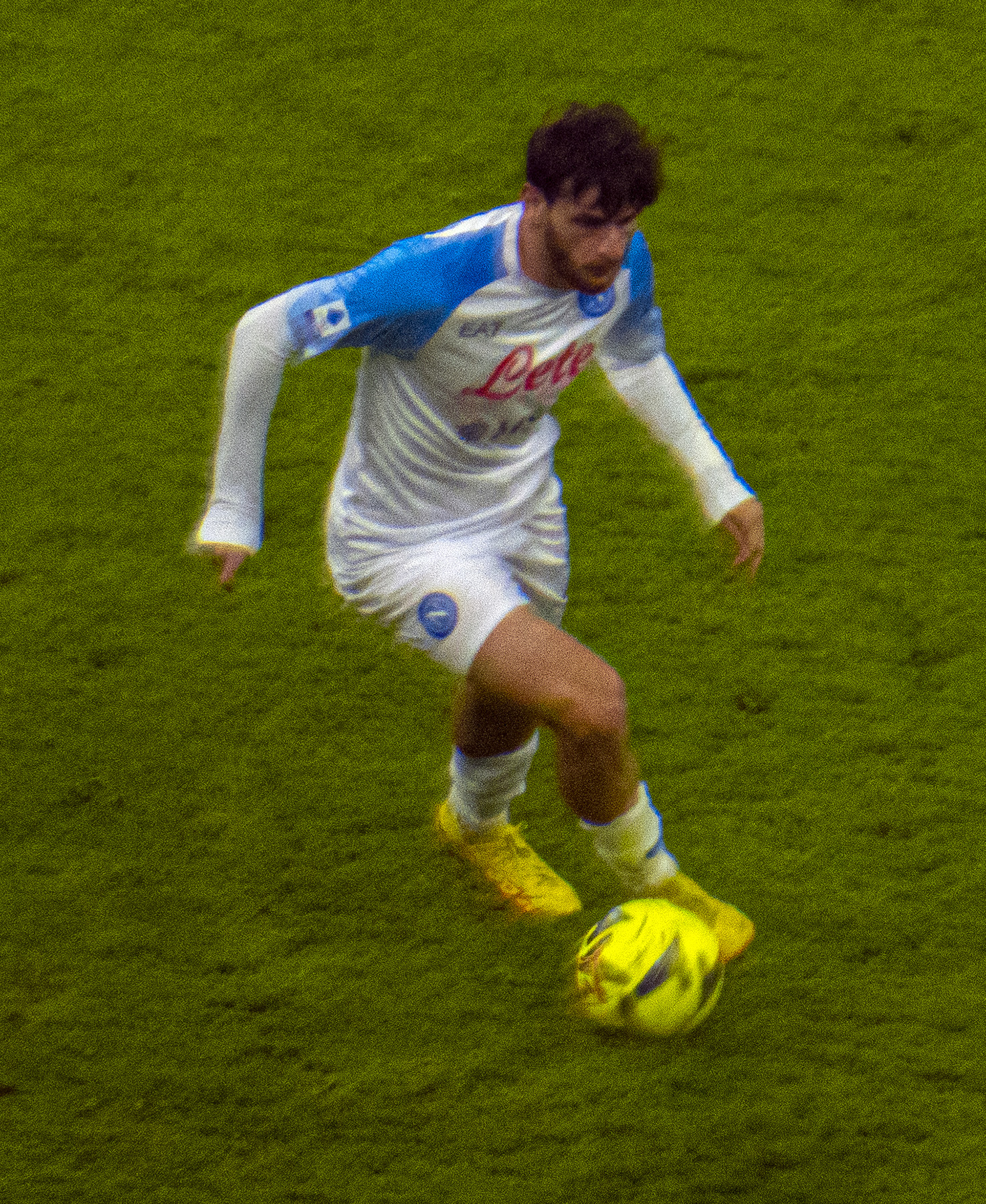
Kvaratskhelia playing for Napoli in 2023

On 4 October, he scored his first Champions League goal in a 6–1 away win over Ajax. With another goal and an assist in the return leg a week later, Kvaratskhelia was named Man of the Match, and included in the competition team of the week. With three goals and an assist in February 2023, Kvaratskhelia was named Serie A Player of the Month for a second time, the first player to win the award multiple times in the same season. The next month brought him more recognition when he received another Serie A Player of the Month award, a similar trophy from Italian Footballers' Association and the Serie A Goal of the Month and Serie A Goal of the Season awards for a stunner scored in a 2–0 win against Atalanta on 11 March.

On 4 May, following a 1–1 draw with Udinese, Napoli were confirmed as Serie A champions for the first time in 33 years. He finished the season as top assist provider with 10, and scored 12 goals, being awarded the Serie A MVP award at the end of the season, and the Champions League young player of the season.

On 27 September, Kvaratskhelia got on the scoresheet in Napoli's 4–1 win over Udinese, ending his six-month goal drought. During this season he scored 10 more times, including one against Fiorentina on 17 May that was recognized by fans as Serie A Goal of the Month. His tally of 11 league goals and six assists were second best among the Napoli players after Victor Osimhen.

On 10 October 2024, Kvaratskhelia was named Serie A Player of the Month for the fourth time, a record he shares with Roma's Paulo Dybala. On 16 January 2025, he announced his departure from Napoli in a video on social media. Many fans were angered by the decision, especially because Napoli were leading Serie A and on track to win their second league title in three years. On 23 May, Napoli won Serie A, and Kvaratskhelia became one of a select few players to win two league titles in one season.

=== Paris Saint-Germain ===
On 17 January 2025, Ligue 1 club Paris Saint-Germain announced the signing of Kvaratskhelia on a contract until June 2029. With this move, he became the first Georgian player in the club's history. A transfer fee of €80 million (70 million plus 10 million in attainable bonuses) was reported.

On 25 January, Kvaratskhelia made his debut in a 1–1 draw against Reims, providing an assist to Ousmane Dembélé for the game's opening goal. On 7 February, he scored his first goal for PSG in a 4–1 win over Monaco. On 19 February, Kvaratskhelia scored his first goal for PSG in the Champions League in a 7–0 win over fellow Ligue 1 side Brest. On 5 April, following a 1–0 win against Angers, PSG won their 13th Ligue 1 title, and Kvaratskhelia became the first Georgian to win Ligue 1. On 24 May, PSG won their 16th Coupe de France, and though Kvaratskhelia didn't play the final due to headache, he won the Coupe de France and became the first ever Georgian to do so. A week later, on 31 May, Kvaratskhelia scored PSG's fourth goal in their 5–0 victory over Inter Milan in the Champions League final, securing the club's first-ever title in the competition. He also became the first Georgian to score in a UEFA club competition final and only the second Georgian to win the Champions League, following Kakha Kaladze.

On 23 June, he scored the opening goal against the Seattle Sounders in the third group stage game of the 2025 FIFA Club World Cup, becoming the first Georgian ever to score in the FIFA Club World Cup. Later that year, on 13 August, he played and won the 2025 UEFA Super Cup against Tottenham Hotspur, becoming the second Georgian to do so after Kakha Kaladze, who played in and won the 2007 UEFA Super Cup.

On 28 April 2026, Kvaratskhelia scored twice in a 5–4 win over Bayern Munich in the first leg of the Champions League semi-final, bringing his tally to ten goals and five assists in a single European campaign and surpassing the club record previously set by Ousmane Dembélé the season before. A week later, on 6 May, he provided an assist in a 1–1 away draw with Bayern Munich, qualifying his club to their second consecutive final by winning 6–5 on aggregate. In addition, he became the first player to record at least one goal contribution in seven consecutive knockout-stage matches in the European competition. On 13 May, he scored a goal in a 2–0 away win against Lens, to secure PSG's 14th and his 2nd Ligue 1 title. Later that month, on 30 May, he won his second consecutive Champions League, earning a penalty in the final against Arsenal after being fouled by Cristhian Mosquera; the resulting spot kick was converted by Ousmane Dembélé in a match that finished 1–1 after extra time before Paris Saint-Germain prevailed 4–3 on penalties. A day later, he was named the competition's Player of the Season.

== International career ==
=== Youth level ===
Kvaratskhelia first represented Georgia at under-17 level, making his debut against Bulgaria in a 1–0 loss on 28 September 2016. In May 2017, Kvaratskhelia was part of the Georgian under-17 team that won the UEFA Development Tournament, scoring against Latvia in the final game. On 8 November 2017, at the age of 16, Kvaratskhelia made his debut for Georgia's under-19's, coming on as a late substitute against Bosnia and Herzegovina in 2018 UEFA European Under-19 Championship qualification. Ten months later, on 5 September 2018, Kvaratskhelia scored his first goal for the under-19's, against the same opposition, in the first game of a double header against Bosnia and Herzegovina in Lučani, Serbia. Due to his performances for Georgia's under-17 team, Kvaratskhelia became the first winner of the newly introduced Aleksandre Chivadze golden medal in 2017, awarded annually by Georgian Football Federation to talented young players. The following year he received a silver medal for his displays for Georgia's under-19's. On 29 May 2018, Kvaratskhelia represented a Georgian under-18 team, scoring Georgia's third goal in a 4–1 win away to Turkey. Prior to his senior call up, Kvaratskhelia represented Georgia's under-21's twice, scoring Georgia's equaliser in an eventual 3–2 loss against France on his debut during qualification for the 2021 UEFA European Under-21 Championship on 15 November 2019.

=== Early senior career ===
Kvaratskhelia made his debut for the Georgia national team on 7 June 2019, as a starter in a Euro 2020 qualifier against Gibraltar. On 14 October 2020, he scored his first senior international goal in a 1–1 UEFA Nations League draw with North Macedonia.

In the 2022 FIFA World Cup qualification on 28 March 2021, Kvaratskhelia scored against Spain, followed by another goal three days later against Greece.

Kvaratskhelia scored three times in four games of the first phase of the 2022–23 Nations League, and topped the list of players in two nominations, including in the overall ranking. In the remaining two autumn games, he added two more goals, which made him the most prolific Georgian player during this tournament. Whoscored.com named him in the Best XI both in June and September and awarded him the highest seasonal rating point (8.2) among Group C team players.

In autumn 2023, Kvaratskhelia added five more goals to his tally and became the first player among the Crusaders to score in four successive matches.

=== UEFA Euro 2024 ===
In March 2024, the national team successfully concluded their qualifying campaign for European championship with Kvaratskhelia widely recognized as a vital contributor to this achievement.

On 22 May 2024, Kvaratskhelia was named in the 26-man squad for the UEFA Euro 2024. On 26 June, he was awarded player of the match, scoring his first goal in the tournament in the second minute of a 2–0 victory over Portugal in the last group stage match, contributing to his nation's qualification to the knockout phase as one of the best third-placed teams. Georgia were eliminated from the tournament in the round of 16 following a 4–1 defeat to future champions Spain.

=== Captain of the Georgian national team ===
On 24 March 2026, he was appointed as captain of the Georgian national team. In his first match as captain, he scored twice in a 2–2 friendly draw against Israel in Tbilisi.

== Player profile ==
A physically powerful and technically gifted player, Kvaratskhelia is a tall inverted left winger with a slender build, who is capable of playing anywhere across the front line. While being adept with either foot, he favours cutting inside from the left flank to strike on goal with his stronger right foot. He is also capable of playing as a second striker. He is known for his elegance, acceleration, and pace on the ball, as well as his dribbling skills and use of feints, which allow him to exploit spaces with his runs on the counter-attack. Due to his vision, finishing, crossing, and accuracy from set-pieces, he is capable of scoring goals himself or creating chances for his teammates.

Considered to be a highly promising young player in the media during his youth, in 2018 Kvaratskhelia was included in The Guardian's "Next Generation 2018: 60 of the best young talents in world football," while in 2019, he was included in UEFA's "50 for the future" for the 2019–20 season. In 2021, L'Équipe included Kvaratskhelia in their list of 50 best players born after 2001. Following his breakthrough 2022–23 league title-winning season with Napoli, he established himself as one of the best players in the world. In 2022, FourFourTwo included him in their list of "The 100 Best Players in the World." Kvaratskhelia is also considered to be one of the most talented Georgian players of all time by several pundits.

Kvaratskhelia's world class performances in Napoli earned him the nicknamed "Kvaradona" among supporters of the club, after the Napoli legend Diego Maradona, as well as the "Georgian Messi," due to their similar playing styles and penchant for dribbling. Fellow former Napoli forward Gianfranco Zola also likened Kvaratskhelia's playing style to that of George Best in 2023. He named Cristiano Ronaldo as his childhood idol.

== Personal life ==
Khvicha is the son of Badri Kvaratskhelia, a Georgian footballer who played for several clubs, including FC Dinamo Tbilisi, and represented the Azerbaijani national football team. He has two brothers, including younger brother Tornike (born 2010), who is also a footballer.

His family is originally from Samegrelo and he grew up speaking Mingrelian.

In August 2022, Kvaratskhelia revealed in an interview that he had been dating Nitsa Tavadze, a Georgian medical university student, for one year. Their marriage ceremony was held at Mtskheta's Samtavro monastery in October 2023.

Kvaratskhelia's son Damiane was born on 21 August 2024 in Tbilisi.

== Career statistics ==
=== Club ===
As of match played 20 October 2026

Appearances and goals by club, season and competition
Club	Season	League			National cup (Note: Includes Georgian Cup, Russian Cup, Coppa Italia, Coupe de France)		Europe		Other		Total	
Club	Season	Division	Apps	Goals	Apps	Goals	Apps	Goals	Apps	Goals	Apps	Goals
Dinamo Tbilisi	2017	Erovnuli Liga	4	1	1	0	—		—		5	1
Rustavi	2018	Erovnuli Liga	18	3	0	0	—		—		18	3
Lokomotiv Moscow (loan)	2018–19	Russian Premier League	7	1	3	0	—		—		10	1
Rubin Kazan	2019–20	Russian Premier League	27	3	1	0	—		—		28	3
Rubin Kazan	2020–21	Russian Premier League	23	4	0	0	—		—		23	4
Rubin Kazan	2021–22	Russian Premier League	19	2	1	0	2 (Note: Appearances in UEFA Europa Conference League)	0	—		22	2
Rubin Kazan	Total		69	9	2	0	2	0	—		73	9
Dinamo Batumi	2022	Erovnuli Liga	11	8	—		—		—		11	8
Napoli	2022–23	Serie A	34	12	0	0	9 (Note: Appearances in UEFA Champions League)	2	—		43	14
Napoli	2023–24	Serie A	34	11	1	0	8	0	2 (Note: Appearances in Supercoppa Italiana)	0	45	11
Napoli	2024–25	Serie A	17	5	2	0	—		—		19	5
Napoli	Total		85	28	3	0	17	2	2	0	107	30
Paris Saint-Germain	2024–25	Ligue 1	14	4	2	0	9	3	7 (Note: Appearances in FIFA Club World Cup)	1	32	8
Paris Saint-Germain	2025–26	Ligue 1	28	8	1	0	16	10	3 (Note: One appearance in UEFA Super Cup, one appearance and one goal in FIFA Intercontinental Cup, one appearance in Trophée des Champions)	1	48	19
Paris Saint-Germain	2026–27	Ligue 1	7	1	0	0	2	0	2 (Note: One appearance and one goal in UEFA Super Cup, one appearance in Trophée des Champions)	1	11	2
Paris Saint-Germain	Total		49	13	3	0	27	13	12	3	91	29
Career total			243	63	12	0	46	15	14	3	315	81

=== International ===
As of match played 5 October 2026

Appearances and goals by national team and year
National team	Year	Apps	Goals
Georgia	2019	1	0
Georgia	2020	4	1
Georgia	2021	7	4
Georgia	2022	7	5
Georgia	2023	9	5
Georgia	2024	12	2
Georgia	2025	7	3
Georgia	2026	7	3
Total		54	23

== Honours ==
Lokomotiv Moscow

- Russian Cup: 2018–19

Napoli

- Serie A: 2022–23, 2024–25

Paris Saint-Germain

- Ligue 1: 2024–25, 2025–26
- Coupe de France: 2024–25
- Trophée des Champions: 2025
- UEFA Champions League: 2024–25, 2025–26
- UEFA Super Cup: 2025, 2026
- FIFA Intercontinental Cup: 2025
- FIFA Club World Cup runner-up: 2025

Individual

- Russian Premier League Young Player of the Season: 2019–20, 2020–21
- Russian Premier League Left Winger of the Season: 2020–21
- Georgian Footballer of the Year: 2020, 2021, 2022 2023, 2025
- UEFA Champions League Young Player of the Season: 2022–23
- UEFA Champions League Player of the Season: 2025–26
- UEFA Champions League Team of the Season: 2025–26
- Serie A Player of the Month: August 2022, February 2023, March 2023, September 2024
- Serie A Goal of the Month: March 2023, May 2024
- Serie A Most Valuable Player: 2022–23
- Serie A Team of the Season: 2022–23
- Serie A top assist provider: 2022–23
- Serie A Goal of the Season: 2022–23
- Serie A Goal of the Year: 2023
- Serie A Team of the Year: 2022–23

=== Orders ===
- Order of Honour: 2024
- St. George's Order of Victory: 2025
