= List of international goals scored by Khvicha Kvaratskhelia =

Khvicha Kvaratskhelia is a Georgian professional footballer who has been playing as a forward for the Georgia national football team since 2019. He scored his first goal against North Macedonia in a nations league match. He has scored 3 braces against: Sweden, Scotland and Israel. He is currently the 2nd top-scorer in Georgia national football team history, tied with his teammate Georges Mikautadze. He has scored in the Nations League, FIFA World Cup qualification, Friendlies, UEFA Euro qualification and at the UEFA Euro.

== Goals ==
List of goals Khvicha Kvaratskhelia has scored internationally.

Scores and results list Georgia's goal tally first, score column indicates score after each Kvaratskhelia goal.

| No. | Date | Venue | Opponent | Score | Result | Competition |
|---|---|---|---|---|---|---|
| 1 | 14 October 2020 | Toše Proeski Arena, Skopje, North Macedonia | North Macedonia | 1–0 | 1–1 | 2020-21 UEFA Nations League C |
| 2 | 28 March 2021 | Boris Paichadze Dinamo Arena, Tbilisi, Georgia | Spain | 1–0 | 1–2 | 2022 FIFA World Cup qualification |
| 3 | 31 March 2021 | Toumba Stadium, Thessaloniki, Greece | Greece | 1–1 | 1–1 | 2022 FIFA World Cup qualification |
| 4 | 11 November 2021 | Batumi Stadium, Batumi, Georgia | Sweden | 1–0 | 2–0 | 2022 FIFA World Cup qualification |
| 5 | 11 November 2021 | Batumi Stadium, Batumi, Georgia | Sweden | 2–0 | 2–0 | 2022 FIFA World Cup qualification |
| 6 | 2 June 2022 | Boris Paichadze Dinamo Arena, Tbilisi, Georgia | Gibraltar | 1–0 | 4–0 | 2022-23 UEFA Nations League C |
| 7 | 5 June 2022 | Huvepharma Arena, Razgrad, Bulgaria | Bulgaria | 4–1 | 5–2 | 2022-23 UEFA Nations League C |
| 8 | 9 June 2022 | Toše Proeski Arena, Skopje, North Macedonia | North Macedonia | 2–0 | 3–0 | 2022-23 UEFA Nations League C |
| 9 | 23 September 2022 | Boris Paichadze Dinamo Arena, Tbilisi, Georgia | North Macedonia | 2–0 | 2–0 | 2022-23 UEFA Nations League C |
| 10 | 26 September 2022 | Victoria Stadium, Gibraltar | Gibraltar | 1–0 | 2–1 | 2022-23 UEFA Nations League C |
| 11 | 12 October 2023 | Mikheil Meskhi Stadium, Tbilisi, Georgia | Thailand | 8–0 | 8–0 | Friendly |
| 12 | 15 October 2023 | Mikheil Meskhi Stadium, Tbilisi, Georgia | Cyprus | 2–0 | 4–0 | UEFA Euro 2024 qualifying |
| 13 | 16 November 2023 | Boris Paichadze Dinamo Arena, Tbilisi, Georgia | Scotland | 1–0 | 2–2 | UEFA Euro 2024 qualifying |
| 14 | 16 November 2023 | Boris Paichadze Dinamo Arena, Tbilisi, Georgia | Scotland | 2–1 | 2–2 | UEFA Euro 2024 qualifying |
| 15 | 19 November 2023 | Estadio José Zorrilla, Valladolid, Spain | Spain | 1–1 | 1–3 | UEFA Euro 2024 qualifying |
| 16 | 26 June 2024 | Arena AufSchalke, Gelsenkirchen, Germany | Portugal | 1–0 | 2–0 | UEFA Euro 2024 |
| 17 | 7 September 2024 | Mikheil Meskhi Stadium, Tbilisi, Georgia | Czech Republic | 1–0 | 4–1 | 2024-25 UEFA Nations League B |
| 18 | 23 March 2025 | Boris Paichadze Dinamo Arena, Tbilisi, Georgia | Armenia | 6–1 | 6–1 | 2024-25 UEFA Nations League promotion/relegation play-offs |
| 19 | 4 September 2025 | Boris Paichadze Dinamo Arena, Tbilisi, Georgia | Turkey | 2–3 | 2–3 | 2026 FIFA World cup qualification |
| 20 | 7 September 2025 | Boris Paichadze Dinamo Arena, Tbilisi, Georgia | Bulgaria | 1–0 | 3–0 | 2026 FIFA World cup qualification |
| 21 | 26 March 2026 | Mikheil Meskhi Stadium, Tbilisi, Georgia | Israel | 1–0 | 2–2 | Friendly |
| 22 | 26 March 2026 | Mikheil Meskhi Stadium, Tbilisi, Georgia | Israel | 2–0 | 2–2 | Friendly |
| 23 | 5 June 2026 | Mikheil Meskhi Stadium, Tbilisi, Georgia | Bahrain | 2–0 | 2–0 | Friendly |

=== Goals by opponent ===
| Opponent | Goals |
|---|---|
| North Macedonia | 3 |
| Spain | 2 |
| Sweden | 2 |
| Gibraltar | 2 |
| Scotland | 2 |
| Bulgaria | 2 |
| Israel | 2 |
| Greece | 1 |
| Thailand | 1 |
| Cyprus | 1 |
| Portugal | 1 |
| Czech Republic | 1 |
| Armenia | 1 |
| Turkey | 1 |
| Bahrain | 1 |
| Total | 23 |
