= Noah Frommelt =

Liechtenstein footballer

Personal information
- Full name: Noah Frommelt
- Date of birth: 18 December 2000 (age 25)
- Place of birth: Liechtenstein
- Height: 1.88 m (6 ft 2 in)
- Position: Midfielder

Youth career
- –2018: Vaduz

Senior career*
Years	Team	Apps	(Gls)
2018–2020	FC Balzers	25	(4)
2020–2022	USV Eschen/Mauren	30	(0)
2022–2025	FC Kosova Zürich	29	(2)

International career^{‡}
2015	Liechtenstein U17	3	(0)
2017–2018	Liechtenstein U19	6	(0)
2018–	Liechtenstein U21	9	(0)
2019–	Liechtenstein	21	(0)
- * Club domestic league appearances and goals as of 6 June 2026 ‡ National team caps and goals as of 26 March 2023

Noah Frommelt (born 18 December 2000) is a Liechtensteiner footballer who last played as a midfielder for FC Kosova Zürich and the Liechtenstein national team.

== Career ==
Frommelt made his international debut for Liechtenstein on 18 November 2019, coming on as a 67th-minute substitute in the UEFA Euro 2020 qualifying match against Bosnia and Herzegovina, which finished as a 0–3 home loss.

== Career statistics ==
=== International ===
As of 26 March 2023

Liechtenstein
Year	Apps	Goals
2019	1	0
2020	4	0
2021	11	0
2022	3	0
2023	2	0
Total	21	0
