= Roman Spirig =

Liechtenstein footballer (born 1998)

Personal information
- Date of birth: 7 January 1998 (age 28)
- Place of birth: Grabs, Switzerland
- Height: 1.84 m (6 ft 0 in)
- Position: Left-back

Youth career
- –2016: Vaduz

Senior career*
Years	Team	Apps	(Gls)
2016–2017	FC Dornbirn	16	(0)
2017–2019	FC Vaduz II		
2019	USV Eschen/Mauren	2	(0)
2020–2022	Balzers	22	(2)
2022	Chur 97	4	(0)

International career^{‡}
2013–2014	Liechtenstein U17	6	(0)
2015	Liechtenstein U19	3	(0)
2015–2020	Liechtenstein U21	17	(0)
2021–2022	Liechtenstein	5	(0)
- * Club domestic league appearances and goals as of 22:08, 26 June 2023 (UTC) ‡ National team caps and goals as of 22:08, 26 June 2023 (UTC)

Roman Spirig (born 7 January 1998) is a former footballer who last played as a left-back for Chur 97. Born in Switzerland, he represented the Liechtenstein national team.

== Career ==
Spirig made his international debut for Liechtenstein on 3 June 2021 in a friendly match against Switzerland.

== Career statistics ==
=== International ===
As of 28 March 2022

Liechtenstein
Year	Apps	Goals
2021	4	0
2022	1	0
Total	5	0
