= Daniel Kaufmann (footballer) =

Liechtenstein footballer (born 1990)

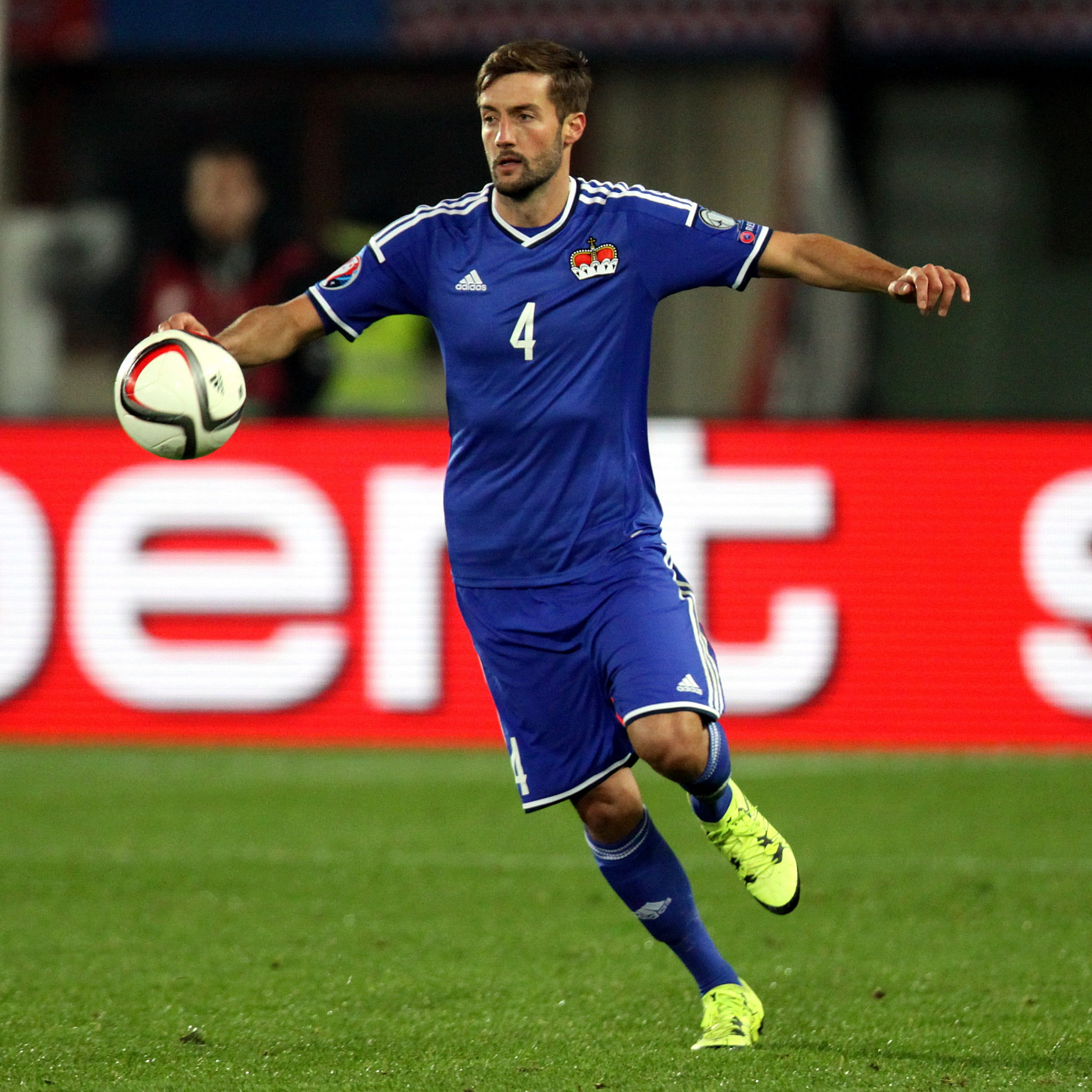

Personal information
- Date of birth: 22 December 1990 (age 35)
- Place of birth: Grabs, Switzerland
- Height: 1.86 m (6 ft 1 in)
- Positions: Defensive midfielder; centre back

Youth career
- 1999–2008: FC Balzers

Senior career*
Years	Team	Apps	(Gls)
2008–2010	FC Balzers	20	(4)
2010–2012	USV Eschen/Mauren	25	(1)
2012–2018	FC Vaduz	60	(1)
2016–2017	→ FC Chiasso (loan)	14	(0)
2017	→ FC Balzers (loan)	8	(0)
2018–2020	FC Balzers	43	(5)
2020–2021	USV Eschen/Mauren	16	(1)

International career
2009–2012	Liechtenstein U21	10	(0)
2010–2021	Liechtenstein	66	(1)
- * Club domestic league appearances and goals

Daniel Kaufmann (born 22 December 1990) is a former footballer. Born in Switzerland, he represented the Liechtenstein national team.

== Career ==
Kaufmann joined FC Balzers senior side in 2008, and USV Eschen/Mauren in 2010. He spent his whole career in Liechtenstein teams, with only a short bracket in Swiss-Italian team Chiasso, during 2016–17 season.

On 28 October 2021, he announced his retirement (to be effective as per following December) leaving both international and club activities at the age of only 30.

== International career ==
He was a member of the Liechtenstein national under-21 football team and had 10 caps. Kaufmann received his first call-up to the senior team for the friendly against Estonia on 17 November 2010 and made his debut after being named in the starting 11.

=== International goals ===
Score and Result lists Liechtenstein's goal tally first

No.	Date	Venue	Opponent	Score	Result	Competition	Ref.
1.	31 March 2015	Sportpark Eschen-Mauren, Eschen, Liechtenstein	San Marino	1–0	1–0	Friendly	

== Honours ==
=== Club ===
FC Vaduz

- Swiss Challenge League (1): 2013–14
- Liechtensteiner Cup (4): 2012–13, 2013–14, 2014–15, 2015–16

USV Eschen/Mauren

- Liechtensteiner Cup (1): 2011–12
