= Martin Marxer =

Liechtenstein footballer (born 1999)

Personal information
- Date of birth: 4 October 1999 (age 27)
- Place of birth: Bellinzona, Switzerland
- Position: Centre-back

Youth career
- –2016: Eschen/Mauren

Senior career*
Years	Team	Apps	(Gls)
2016–2018	Vaduz II		
2018–2019	Eschen/Mauren II		
2019–2022	FC Ostermundigen		
2022–2024	FC Muri-Gümligen	37	(0)
2024–2025	Düdingen	19	(1)

International career^{‡}
2014–2015	Liechtenstein U17	3	(0)
2016–2017	Liechtenstein U19	6	(0)
2018–2020	Liechtenstein U21	9	(0)
2021–2024	Liechtenstein	16	(0)
- * Club domestic league appearances and goals as of 6 June 2026 ‡ National team caps and goals as of 19 November 2024

Martin Marxer (born 4 October 1999) is a footballer who last played as a centre-back for Swiss club SC Düdingen. Born in Switzerland, he represented the Liechtenstein national team.

== Career ==
Marxer made his international debut for Liechtenstein on 28 March 2021 in a 2022 FIFA World Cup qualification match against North Macedonia, which finished as a 5–0 away loss.

== Personal life ==
His uncles Donath and Horst also represented Liechtenstein.

== Career statistics ==
=== International ===
As of 19 November 2024

Liechtenstein
Year	Apps	Goals
2021	2	0
2022	2	0
2023	4	0
2024	8	0
Total	16	0
