= Bosnia and Herzegovina national football team results (2020–present) =

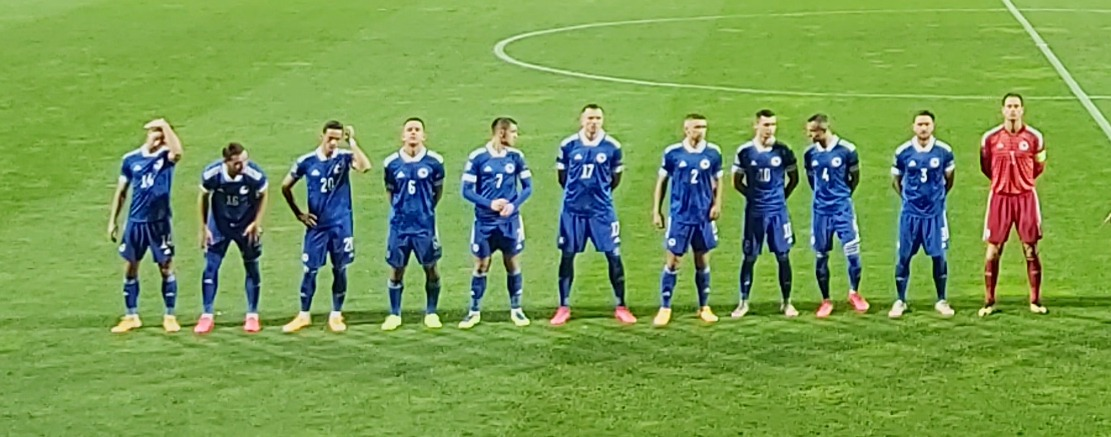
Bosnia and Herzegovina team before match against Poland on 7 September 2020

This article provides details of international football games played by the Bosnia and Herzegovina national football team from 2020 to present.

For results prior to 2020, see Bosnia and Herzegovina national football team results (1995–2019).

== Results ==
Key
Win
Draw
Defeat

=== 2020 ===
4 September 2020 2020–21 Nations League	Italy	1–1	Bosnia and Herzegovina	Florence, Italy
20:45 UTC+2	Sensi 67'	Report	Džeko 57'	Stadium: Stadio Artemio Franchi; Attendance: 0 (Note: Due to the COVID-19 pandemic in Europe, all matches scheduled for September 2020 were played behind closed doors.); Referee: Anastasios Sidiropoulos (Greece)

7 September 2020 2020–21 Nations League	Bosnia and Herzegovina	1–2	Poland	Zenica, Bosnia and Herzegovina
20:45 UTC+2	Hajradinović 24' (pen.)	Report	Glik 45'; Grosicki 67'	Stadium: Bilino Polje; Attendance: 0 Referee: Cüneyt Çakır (Turkey)

8 October 2020 Euro 2020 qualifying play-offs	Bosnia and Herzegovina	1–1 (a.e.t.) (3–4 p)	Northern Ireland	Sarajevo, Bosnia and Herzegovina
20:45 UTC+2	Krunić 14'	Report	McGinn 53'	Stadium: Stadion Grbavica (Note: The Bosnia and Herzegovina v Northern Ireland match, originally scheduled to be played at Bilino Polje Stadium, Zenica, was later moved to Stadion Grbavica, Sarajevo.); Attendance: 1,800; Referee: Antonio Mateu Lahoz (Spain)
	Penalties
	Pjanić (penalty scored); Hajradinović (penalty missed); Višća (penalty missed); Hotić (penalty scored); Džeko (penalty scored)		(penalty scored) Dallas; (penalty scored) Lafferty; (penalty missed) Saville; (penalty scored) Washington; (penalty scored) Boyce

11 October 2020 2020–21 Nations League	Bosnia and Herzegovina	0–0	Netherlands	Zenica, Bosnia and Herzegovina
18:00 UTC+2		Report		Stadium: Bilino Polje; Attendance: 1,600; Referee: István Kovács (Romania)

14 October 2020 2020–21 Nations League	Poland	3–0	Bosnia and Herzegovina	Wrocław, Poland
20:45 UTC+2	Lewandowski 40', 51'; Linetty 45+1'	Report		Stadium: Stadion Miejski; Attendance: 8,152; Referee: Craig Pawson (England)

12 November 2020 Friendly	Bosnia and Herzegovina	0–2	Iran	Sarajevo, Bosnia and Herzegovina
18:00 UTC+1		Report	Rezaei 46'; Ghayedi 90+1'	Stadium: Koševo City Stadium; Attendance: 0 Referee: Milovan Milačić (Montenegro)

15 November 2020 2020–21 Nations League	Netherlands	3–1	Bosnia and Herzegovina	Amsterdam, Netherlands
18:00 UTC+1	Wijnaldum 6', 14'; Depay 55'	Report	Prevljak 63'	Stadium: Johan Cruyff Arena; Attendance: 0 (Note: Due to the COVID-19 pandemic in Europe, the match was played behind closed doors.); Referee: François Letexier (France)

18 November 2020 2020–21 Nations League	Bosnia and Herzegovina	0–2	Italy	Zenica, Bosnia and Herzegovina
20:45 UTC+1		Report	Belotti 22'; Berardi 68'	Stadium: Bilino Polje; Attendance: 0 Referee: Artur Soares Dias (Portugal)

=== 2021 ===
24 March 2021 2022 World Cup qualification	Finland	2–2	Bosnia and Herzegovina	Helsinki, Finland
21:45 UTC+3	Pukki 58', 77'	Report	Pjanić 55'; Stevanović 84'	Stadium: Helsinki Olympic Stadium; Attendance: 0 Referee: Anastasios Sidiropoulos (Greece)

27 March 2021 Friendly	Bosnia and Herzegovina	0–0	Costa Rica	Zenica, Bosnia and Herzegovina
18:00 UTC+1		Report		Stadium: Bilino Polje; Attendance: 0 Referee: Nejc Kajtazovič (Slovenia)

31 March 2021 2022 World Cup qualification	Bosnia and Herzegovina	0–1	France	Sarajevo, Bosnia and Herzegovina
20:45 UTC+2		Report	Griezmann 60'	Stadium: Stadion Grbavica; Attendance: 0 Referee: Daniele Orsato (Italy)

2 June 2021 Friendly	Bosnia and Herzegovina	0–0	Montenegro	Sarajevo, Bosnia and Herzegovina
21:00 UTC+2		Report		Stadium: Grbavica; Attendance: 0 Referee: Novak Simović (Serbia)

6 June 2021 Friendly	Denmark	2–0	Bosnia and Herzegovina	Brøndby, Denmark
18:00 UTC+2	Braithwaite 18'; Cornelius 73'	Report		Stadium: Brøndby Stadium; Attendance: 7,459; Referee: Petri Viljanen (Finland)

1 September 2021 2022 World Cup qualification	France	1–1	Bosnia and Herzegovina	Saint-Denis, France
20:45 UTC+2	Griezmann 40'	Report	Džeko 36'	Stadium: Stade de France; Attendance: 21,754; Referee: Sandro Schärer (Switzerland)

4 September 2021 Friendly	Bosnia and Herzegovina	1–0	Kuwait	Zenica, Bosnia and Herzegovina
20:45 UTC+2	Prevljak 66'	Report		Stadium: Bilino Polje; Attendance: 400; Referee: Miloš Milanović (Serbia)

7 September 2021 2022 World Cup qualification	Bosnia and Herzegovina	2–2	Kazakhstan	Zenica, Bosnia and Herzegovina
20:45 UTC+2	Pjanić 74' (pen.); Menalo 86'	Report	Kuat 52'; Zaynutdinov 90+5'	Stadium: Bilino Polje; Attendance: 3,980; Referee: Yigal Frid (Israel)

9 October 2021 2022 World Cup qualification	Kazakhstan	0–2	Bosnia and Herzegovina	Nur-Sultan, Kazakhstan
19:00		Report	Prevljak 25', 66'	Stadium: Astana Stadium; Attendance: 12,897; Referee: Davide Massa (Italy)

12 October 2021 2022 World Cup qualification	Ukraine	1–1	Bosnia and Herzegovina	Lviv, Ukraine
21:45 UTC+3	Yarmolenko 15'	Report	Ahmedhodžić 77'	Stadium: Arena Lviv; Attendance: 23,810; Referee: Felix Zwayer (Germany)

13 November 2021 2022 World Cup qualification	Bosnia and Herzegovina	1–3	Finland	Zenica, Bosnia and Herzegovina
15:00 UTC+1	Menalo 69'	Report	Forss 29'; Lod 51'; O'Shaughnessy 73'	Stadium: Bilino Polje Stadium; Attendance: 10.000; Referee: Michael Oliver (England)

16 November 2021 2022 World Cup qualification	Bosnia and Herzegovina	0–2	Ukraine	Zenica, Bosnia and Herzegovina
20:45 UTC+1		Report	Zinchenko 59'; Dovbyk 79'	Stadium: Bilino Polje Stadium; Attendance: 3,370; Referee: Antonio Mateu Lahoz (Spain)

18 December 2021 Friendly	United States	1–0	Bosnia and Herzegovina	Carson, United States
17:00 UTC−8	Bassett 89'	Report		Stadium: Dignity Health Sports Park; Attendance: 11,044; Referee: Keylor Herrera (Costa Rica)

=== 2022 ===
25 March 2022 Friendly	Bosnia and Herzegovina	0–1	Georgia	Zenica, Bosnia and Herzegovina
20:45 UTC+1		Report	Zivzivadze 49'	Stadium: Bilino Polje Stadium; Attendance: 1.500; Referee: Aleksandar Stavrev (North Macedonia)

29 March 2022 Friendly	Bosnia and Herzegovina	1–0	Luxembourg	Zenica, Bosnia and Herzegovina
20:45 UTC+2	Džeko 86'	Report		Stadium: Bilino Polje Stadium; Attendance: 6,000; Referee: David Šmajc (Slovenia)

4 June 2022 2022–23 Nations League	Finland	1–1	Bosnia and Herzegovina	Helsinki, Finland
19:00 UTC+3	Pukki 45+1' (pen.)	Report	Prevljak 90+3'	Stadium: Helsinki Olympic Stadium; Attendance: 20,181; Referee: Nicholas Walsh (Scotland)

7 June 2022 2022–23 Nations League	Bosnia and Herzegovina	1–0	Romania	Zenica, Bosnia and Herzegovina
21:05 UTC+2	Prevljak 68'	Report		Stadium: Bilino Polje Stadium; Attendance: 4,500; Referee: Sascha Stegemann (Germany)
Note: The match was originally scheduled to kick-off at 20:45 but was delayed to 21:05 due to adverse weather conditions.

11 June 2022 2022–23 Nations League	Montenegro	1–1	Bosnia and Herzegovina	Podgorica, Montenegro
15:00 UTC+2	Marušić 77'	Report	Menalo 62'	Stadium: Podgorica City Stadium; Attendance: 6,555; Referee: Daniele Orsato (Italy)

14 June 2022 2022–23 Nations League	Bosnia and Herzegovina	3–2	Finland	Zenica, Bosnia and Herzegovina
20:45 UTC+2	Pjanić 5' (pen.); Džeko 29', 58'	Report	Pukki 10'; Källman 18'	Stadium: Bilino Polje Stadium; Attendance: 8,150; Referee: Georgi Kabakov (Bulgaria)

23 September 2022 2022–23 Nations League	Bosnia and Herzegovina	1–0	Montenegro	Zenica, Bosnia and Herzegovina
20:45 UTC+2	Demirović 45+1'	Report		Stadium: Bilino Polje Stadium; Attendance: 12,050; Referee: Szymon Marciniak (Poland)

26 September 2022 2022–23 Nations League	Romania	4–1	Bosnia and Herzegovina	Bucharest, Romania
21:45 UTC+3	Man 38'; Pușcaș 73', 86'; Rațiu 79'	Report	Džeko 77'	Stadium: Stadionul Rapid-Giulești; Attendance: 12,693; Referee: Halil Umut Meler (Turkey)

=== 2023 ===
23 March 2023 Euro 2024 qualifying	Bosnia and Herzegovina	3–0	Iceland	Zenica, Bosnia and Herzegovina
20:45 UTC+1	Krunić 14', 40'; Dedić 63'	Report		Stadium: Bilino Polje Stadium; Attendance: 9,234; Referee: Donatas Rumšas (Lithuania)

26 March 2023 Euro 2024 qualifying	Slovakia	2–0	Bosnia and Herzegovina	Bratislava, Slovakia
20:45 UTC+2	Mak 13'; Haraslín 40'	Report		Stadium: Tehelné pole Attendance: 6,052; Referee: Marco Di Bello (Italy)

17 June 2023 Euro 2024 qualifying	Portugal	3–0	Bosnia and Herzegovina	Lisbon, Portugal
19:45 UTC+1	B. Silva 44'; Fernandes 77', 90+3'	Report		Stadium: Estádio da Luz; Attendance: 55,058; Referee: Davide Massa (Italy)

20 June 2023 Euro 2024 qualifying	Bosnia and Herzegovina	0–2	Luxembourg	Zenica, Bosnia and Herzegovina
20:45 UTC+2		Report	Borges Sanches 4'; Sinani 74'	Stadium: Bilino Polje Stadium; Attendance: 8,600; Referee: Gal Leibovitz (Israel)

8 September 2023 Euro 2024 qualifying	Bosnia and Herzegovina	2–1	Liechtenstein	Zenica, Bosnia and Herzegovina
20:45 UTC+2	Džeko 3'; Lüchinger 18' (o.g.)	Report	Wolfinger 21'	Stadium: Bilino Polje Stadium; Attendance: 6,189; Referee: Sayat Karabayev (Kazakhstan)

11 September 2023 Euro 2024 qualifying	Iceland	1–0	Bosnia and Herzegovina	Reykjavík, Iceland
18:45 UTC+0	Finnbogason 90+1'	Report		Stadium: Laugardalsvöllur; Attendance: 5,229; Referee: Lawrence Visser (Belgium)

13 October 2023 Euro 2024 qualifying	Liechtenstein	0–2	Bosnia and Herzegovina	Vaduz, Liechtenstein
20:45 UTC+2		Report	Rahmanović 13'; Stevanović 41'	Stadium: Rheinpark Stadion; Attendance: 5,874; Referee: Damian Sylwestrzak (Poland)

16 October 2023 Euro 2024 qualifying	Bosnia and Herzegovina	0–5	Portugal	Zenica, Bosnia and Herzegovina
20:45 UTC+2		Report	Ronaldo 5' (pen.), 20'; Fernandes 25'; Cancelo 32'; Félix 41'	Stadium: Bilino Polje Stadium; Attendance: 13,047; Referee: Halil Umut Meler (Turkey)

16 November 2023 Euro 2024 qualifying	Luxembourg	4–1	Bosnia and Herzegovina	Luxembourg City, Luxembourg
20:45 UTC+1	Olesen 6'; Rodrigues 30' (pen.), 90+5'; Mujakić 55' (o.g.)	Report	Renato Gojković 90+3'	Stadium: Stade de Luxembourg; Attendance: 8.520; Referee: Andris Treimanis (Latvia)

19 November 2023 Euro 2024 qualifying	Bosnia and Herzegovina	1–2	Slovakia	Zenica, Bosnia and Herzegovina
20:45 UTC+1	Gojković (yellow card) 35' (yellow-red card) 63'; Hrošovský 49' (o.g.)	Report	Boženík 52'; Šatka 71'	Stadium: Bilino Polje Stadium; Attendance: 1.200; Referee: Julian Weinberger (Austria)

=== 2024 ===
21 March 2024 Euro 2024 qualifying play-offs	Bosnia and Herzegovina	1–2	Ukraine	Zenica, Bosnia and Herzegovina
20:45	Matviyenko 56' (o.g.)	Report	Yaremchuk 85'; Dovbyk 88'	Stadium: Bilino Polje Stadium; Attendance: 10,992; Referee: Felix Zwayer (Germany)

3 June 2024 Friendly	England	3–0	Bosnia and Herzegovina	Newcastle upon Tyne, England
19:45 GMT	Palmer 60' (pen.); Alexander-Arnold 85'; Kane 89'	Report		Stadium: St James' Park; Attendance: 50,061; Referee: Rohit Saggi (Norway)

9 June 2024 Friendly	Italy	1–0	Bosnia and Herzegovina	Empoli, Italy
20:45 CEST (UTC+02:00)	Frattesi 38'	Report		Stadium: Stadio Carlo Castellani; Attendance: 12,000; Referee: Chrysovalantis Theouli (Cyprus)

7 September 2024 2024–25 Nations League	Netherlands	5–2	Bosnia and Herzegovina	Eindhoven, Netherlands
20:45 CEST (UTC+02:00)	Zirkzee 13'; Reijnders 45+2'; Gakpo 56'; Weghorst 88'; Simons 90+2'	Report	Demirović 27'; Džeko 73'	Stadium: Philips Stadion; Attendance: 31,139; Referee: Donatas Rumšas (Lithuania)

10 September 2024 2024–25 Nations League	Hungary	0–0	Bosnia and Herzegovina	Budapest, Hungary
20:45 CEST (UTC+02:00)		Report		Stadium: Puskás Aréna; Attendance: 46,443; Referee: Marco Guida (Italy)

11 October 2024 2024–25 Nations League	Bosnia and Herzegovina	1–2	Germany	Zenica, Bosnia and Herzegovina
20:45 CEST (UTC+02:00)	Džeko 70'	Report	Undav 30', 36'	Stadium: Bilino Polje Stadium; Attendance: 11,000; Referee: François Letexier (France)

14 October 2024 2024–25 Nations League	Bosnia and Herzegovina	0–2	Hungary	Zenica, Bosnia and Herzegovina
20:45 CEST (UTC+02:00)		Report	Szoboszlai 38', 50' (pen.)	Stadium: Bilino Polje Stadium; Attendance: 8,329; Referee: Anthony Taylor (England)

16 November 2024 2024–25 Nations League	Germany	7–0	Bosnia and Herzegovina	Freiburg im Breisgau, Germany
20:45 CEST (UTC+01:00)	Musiala 2'; Kleindienst 23', 79'; Havertz 37'; Wirtz 50', 57'; Sané 66'	Report		Stadium: Europa-Park Stadion; Attendance: 28,143; Referee: Vassilis Fotias (Greece)

19 November 2024 2024–25 Nations League	Bosnia and Herzegovina	1–1	Netherlands	Zenica, Bosnia and Herzegovina
20:45 CEST (UTC+01:00)	Demirović 67'	Report	Brobbey 24'	Stadium: Bilino Polje Stadium; Attendance: 4,134; Referee: Aliyar Aghayev (Azerbaijan)

=== 2025 ===
21 March 2025 2026 World Cup qualification	Romania	0–1	Bosnia and Herzegovina	Bucharest, Romania
20:45 CET (UTC+01:00)		Report	Gigović 14'	Stadium: National Arena; Attendance: 49,413; Referee: Danny Makkelie (Netherlands)

24 March 2025 2026 World Cup qualification	Bosnia and Herzegovina	2–1	Cyprus	Zenica, Bosnia and Herzegovina
20:45 CET (UTC+01:00)	Demirović 22'; Hajradinović 56'	Report	Pittas 45+2'	Stadium: Stadion Bilino Polje; Attendance: 7,464; Referee: Rohit Saggi (Norway)

7 June 2025 2026 World Cup qualification	Bosnia and Herzegovina	1–0	San Marino	Zenica, Bosnia and Herzegovina
15:00 CEST (UTC+02:00)	Džeko 66'	Report		Stadium: Stadion Bilino Polje; Attendance: 11,828; Referee: Luís Godinho (Portugal)

10 June 2025 Friendly	Slovenia	2–1	Bosnia and Herzegovina	Celje, Slovenia
18:00 CEST (UTC+02:00)	Verbič 63'; Vombergar 88' (pen.)	Report	Muharemović 90+3'	Stadium: Stadion Z'dežele; Attendance: 12,073; Referee: Nikola Dabanović (Montenegro)

6 September 2025 2026 World Cup qualification	San Marino	0–6	Bosnia and Herzegovina	Serravalle, San Marino
20:45 CEST (UTC+02:00)		Report	Tahirović 21'; Džeko 70', 72'; Baždar 81'; Alajbegović 85'; Mujakić 90'	Stadium: San Marino Stadium; Attendance: 2,740; Referee: Enea Jorgji (Albania)

9 September 2025 2026 World Cup qualification	Bosnia and Herzegovina	1–2	Austria	Zenica, Bosnia and Herzegovina
20:45 CEST (UTC+02:00)	Džeko 50'	Report	Sabitzer 49'; Laimer 65'	Stadium: Stadion Bilino Polje; Attendance: 11,700; Referee: Jesús Gil Manzano (Spain)

9 October 2025 2026 World Cup qualification	Cyprus	2–2	Bosnia and Herzegovina	Larnaca, Cyprus
20:45 CEST (UTC+02:00)	Laifis 45+1'; Pittas 90+7' (pen.)	Report	Katić 10'; Michail 36' (o.g.)	Stadium: AEK Arena; Attendance: 2,355; Referee: Lawrence Visser (Belgium)

12 October 2025 Friendly	Malta	1–4	Bosnia and Herzegovina	Ta' Qali, Malta
19:00 CEST (UTC+02:00)	P. Mbong 60' (pen.)	Report	Memić 16'; Tabaković 53'; Tahirović 84'; Omerović 86'	Stadium: National Stadium; Attendance: 1,800; Referee: Vitālijs Spasjoņņikovs (Latvia)

15 November 2025 2026 World Cup qualification	Bosnia and Herzegovina	3–1	Romania	Zenica, Bosnia and Herzegovina
20:45 CET (UTC+01:00)	Džeko 49'; Bajraktarević 79'; Tabaković 90+4'	Report	Bîrligea 17'	Stadium: Stadion Bilino Polje; Attendance: 11,459; Referee: Michael Oliver (England)

18 November 2025 2026 World Cup qualification	Austria	1–1	Bosnia and Herzegovina	Vienna, Austria
20:45 CET (UTC+01:00)	Gregoritsch 77'	Report	Tabaković 12'	Stadium: Ernst-Happel-Stadion; Attendance: 48,000; Referee: João Pinheiro (Portugal)

=== 2026 ===
26 March 2026 2026 World Cup qualification play-offs	Wales	1–1 (a.e.t.) (2–4 p)	Bosnia and Herzegovina	Cardiff, Wales
19:45 UTC+0	James 51'	Report	Džeko 86'	Stadium: Cardiff City Stadium; Attendance: 32,487; Referee: István Kovács (Romania)
	Penalties
	Wilson (penalty scored); Harris (penalty scored); Johnson (penalty missed); Williams (penalty missed)		(penalty missed) Demirović; (penalty scored) Tabaković; (penalty scored) Bašić; (penalty scored) Hadžiahmetović; (penalty scored) Alajbegović

31 March 2026 2026 World Cup qualification play-offs	Bosnia and Herzegovina	1–1 (a.e.t.) (4–1 p)	Italy	Zenica, Bosnia and Herzegovina
20:45 UTC+2	Tabaković 79'	Report	Kean 15'	Stadium: Stadion Bilino Polje; Attendance: 9,500; Referee: Clément Turpin (France)
	Penalties
	Tahirović (penalty scored); Tabaković (penalty scored); Alajbegović (penalty scored); Bajraktarević (penalty scored)		(penalty missed) Esposito; (penalty scored) Tonali; (penalty missed) Cristante

29 May 2026 Friendly	Bosnia and Herzegovina	0–0	North Macedonia	Sarajevo, Bosnia and Herzegovina
20:30 UTC+2		Report		Stadium: Stadion Koševo; Attendance: 28,961; Referee: Rade Obrenović (Slovenia)

6 June 2026 Friendly	Bosnia and Herzegovina	1–1	Panama	St. Louis, United States
14:00 UTC−5	Katić 24'	Report	Ramos 45+2'	Stadium: Energizer Park; Attendance: 20,000; Referee: Luis Enrique Santander (Mexico)

12 June 2026 2026 World Cup Group B	Canada	1–1	Bosnia and Herzegovina	Toronto, Canada
15:00 UTC−4	Larin 78'	Report	Lukić 21'	Stadium: BMO Field; Attendance: 43,002; Referee: Facundo Tello (Argentina)

18 June 2026 2026 World Cup Group B	Switzerland	4–1	Bosnia and Herzegovina	Inglewood, United States
12:00 UTC−7	Manzambi 74', 90'; Vargas 84'; Xhaka 90+7' (pen.)	Report	Mahmić 90+3'	Stadium: SoFi Stadium; Attendance: 70.026; Referee: João Pinheiro (Portugal)

24 June 2026 2026 World Cup Group B	Bosnia and Herzegovina	3–1	Qatar	Seattle, United States
12:00 UTC−7	Alajbegović 29'; Abunada 34' (o.g.); Mahmić 80'	Report	Al-Haydos 42'	Stadium: Lumen Field; Attendance: 66,925; Referee: Jesús Valenzuela (Venezuela)

1 July 2026 2026 World Cup Round of 32	United States	2–0	Bosnia and Herzegovina	Santa Clara, United States
17:00 UTC−7	Balogun 45'; Tillman 82'	Report		Stadium: Levi's Stadium; Attendance: 68,827; Referee: Raphael Claus (Brazil)

25 September 2026 2026–27 Nations League	Poland	0–0	Bosnia and Herzegovina	Warsaw, Poland
20:45 UTC+2		Report		Stadium: Stadion Narodowy; Attendance: 46,775; Referee: Anastasios Papapetrou (Greece)

28 September 2026 2026–27 Nations League	Romania	2–4	Bosnia and Herzegovina	Bucharest, Romania
21:45 UTC+3	Bîrligea 28'; Cicâldău 62'	Report	Gigović 12'; Muharemović 19'; Tabaković 40'; Mahmić 55'	Stadium: Arena Națională; Attendance: 0 Referee: Luis Godinho (Portugal)

2 October 2026 2026–27 Nations League	Bosnia and Herzegovina	1–1	Sweden	Zenica, Bosnia and Herzegovina
20:45 UTC+2	Alajbegović 80'	Report	Gyökeres 61'	Stadium: Stadion Bilino Polje; Attendance: 11,700; Referee: Oleksii Derevinskyi (Ukraine)

5 October 2026 2026–27 Nations League	Bosnia and Herzegovina	1–0	Poland	Zenica, Bosnia and Herzegovina
20:45 UTC+2	Bašić 84' (pen.)	Report		Stadium: Stadion Bilino Polje; Attendance: 11,700; Referee: Jérémie Pignard (France)

14 November 2026 2026–27 Nations League	Sweden	3–2	Bosnia and Herzegovina	Solna, Sweden
20:45 UTC+2	Svensson 5'; Gyökeres 11' (pen.), 45+2' (pen.)	Report	Gigović 47'; Kolašinac 62'	Stadium: Nationalarenan; Attendance: 51,049; Referee: Simone Sozza (Italy)

17 November 2026 2026–27 Nations League	Bosnia and Herzegovina	2–1	Romania	Zenica, Bosnia and Herzegovina
20:45 UTC+2	Tahirović 44'; Bajraktarević 82'	Report	Bîrligea 6'	Stadium: Stadion Bilino Polje; Attendance: 11,460; Referee: José María Sánchez Martínez (Spain)
