= Luxembourg national football team results (2020–present) =

- Win Draw Loss

This article provides details of international football games played by the Luxembourg national football team from 2020 to present.

== Results ==
Key
Win
Draw
Defeat

=== 2020 ===
5 September 2020 2020–21 Nations League	Azerbaijan	1–2	Luxembourg	Baku, Azerbaijan
20:00 UTC+4	Sheydayev 43'	Report	Krivotsyuk 48' (o.g.); Rodrigues 72' (pen.)	Stadium: Olympic Stadium; Attendance: 0 (Note: Due to the COVID-19 pandemic in Europe, all matches scheduled for September 2020 were played behind closed doors.); Referee: Chris Kavanagh (England)

8 September 2020 2020–21 Nations League	Luxembourg	0–1	Montenegro	Luxembourg, Luxembourg
20:45 UTC+2		Report	Bećiraj 90+3' (pen.)	Stadium: Stade Josy Barthel; Attendance: 0 Referee: Lawrence Visser (Belgium)

7 October 2020 Friendly	Luxembourg	1–2	Liechtenstein	Luxembourg, Luxembourg
20:15 UTC+2	Rodrigues 72'	Report	Wolfinger 23'; Hasler 62' (pen.)	Stadium: Stade Josy Barthel; Attendance: 0 Referee: Alexandre Boucaut (Belgium)

10 October 2020 2020–21 Nations League	Luxembourg	2–0	Cyprus	Luxembourg, Luxembourg
15:00 UTC+2	Sinani 12', 26'	Report		Stadium: Stade Josy Barthel; Attendance: 1,334; Referee: Don Robertson (Scotland)

13 October 2020 2020–21 Nations League	Montenegro	1–2	Luxembourg	Podgorica, Montenegro
20:45 UTC+2	Ivanović 34'	Report	Muratović 42'; Sinani 86'	Stadium: City Stadium; Attendance: 0 Referee: Sascha Stegemann (Germany)

11 November 2020 Friendly	Luxembourg	0–3	Austria	Luxembourg, Luxembourg
20:30 UTC+1		Report	Trauner 61'; Grbić 83'; Wiesinger 90+3'	Stadium: Stade Josy Barthel; Attendance: 0 Referee: Amaury Delerue (France)

14 November 2020 2020–21 Nations League	Cyprus	2–1	Luxembourg	Nicosia, Cyprus
19:00 UTC+2	Kastanos 34' (pen.), 71'	Report	Kousoulos 5' (o.g.)	Stadium: GSP Stadium; Attendance: 0 Referee: Mattias Gestranius (Finland)

17 November 2020 2020–21 Nations League	Luxembourg	0–0	Azerbaijan	Luxembourg, Luxembourg
20:45 UTC+1		Report		Stadium: Stade Josy Barthel; Attendance: 100; Referee: Felix Zwayer (Germany)

=== 2021 ===
24 March 2021 Friendly	Qatar	1–0	Luxembourg	Debrecen, Hungary
12:00 UTC+1	Muntari 12'	Report		Stadium: Nagyerdei Stadion; Attendance: 0 Referee: Miloš Đorđić (Serbia)

27 March 2021 2022 FIFA World Cup qualification	Republic of Ireland	0–1	Luxembourg	Dublin, Ireland
19:45 UTC+0		Report	Rodrigues 85'	Stadium: Aviva Stadium; Attendance: 0 Referee: Fran Jović (Croatia)

30 March 2021 2022 FIFA World Cup qualification	Luxembourg	1–3	Portugal	Luxembourg, Luxembourg
20:45 UTC+2	Rodrigues 30'	Report	Jota 45+2'; Ronaldo 51'; Palhinha 80'	Stadium: Stade Josy Barthel; Attendance: 0 Referee: Sergey Ivanov (Russia)

2 June 2021 Friendly	Norway	1–0	Luxembourg	Málaga, Spain
19:00 UTC+2	Haaland 90+2'	Report		Stadium: La Rosaleda; Attendance: 0 Referee: Kristoffer Karlsson (Sweden)

6 June 2021 Friendly	Luxembourg	0–1	Scotland	Luxembourg, Luxembourg
18:00 UTC+2		Report	Adams 27'	Stadium: Stade Josy Barthel; Attendance: 1,000; Referee: Eldorjan Hamiti (Albania)

1 September 2021 2022 FIFA World Cup qualification	Luxembourg	2–1	Azerbaijan	Luxembourg, Luxembourg
20:45 UTC+2	Pinto 8'; Rodrigues 28' (pen.)	Report	Mahmudov 67'	Stadium: Stade de Luxembourg; Attendance: 2,000; Referee: Irfan Peljto (Bosnia and Herzegovina)

4 September 2021 2022 FIFA World Cup qualification	Serbia	4–1	Luxembourg	Belgrade, Serbia
18:00 UTC+2	Mitrović 22', 35'; Chanot 82' (o.g.); Milenković 90+6'	Report	O. Thill 77'	Stadium: Stadion Rajko Mitić; Attendance: 10,078; Referee: Halil Umut Meler (Turkey)

7 September 2021 Friendly	Luxembourg	1–1	Qatar	Luxembourg, Luxembourg
20:45 UTC+2	Borges Sanches 31'	Report	Ahmed 43'	Stadium: Stade de Luxembourg; Attendance: 2,000; Referee: Jonathan Lardot (Belgium)

9 October 2021 2022 FIFA World Cup qualification	Luxembourg	0–1	Serbia	Luxembourg, Luxembourg
20:45 UTC+2		Report	Vlahović 68'	Stadium: Stade de Luxembourg; Attendance: 2,000; Referee: William Collum (Scotland)

12 October 2021 2022 FIFA World Cup qualification	Portugal	5–0	Luxembourg	Faro/Loulé, Portugal
19:45 UTC+1	Ronaldo 8' (pen.), 13' (pen.), 87'; Fernandes 18'; Palhinha 69'	Report		Stadium: Estádio Algarve; Attendance: 18,553; Referee: Benoît Bastien (France)

11 November 2021 2022 FIFA World Cup qualification	Azerbaijan	1–3	Luxembourg	Baku, Azerbaijan
21:00 UTC+4	Salahli 82'	Report	Rodrigues 67', 90+1'; S. Thill 78'	Stadium: Olympic Stadium; Attendance: 2,986; Referee: Manuel Schüttengruber (Austria)

14 November 2021 2022 FIFA World Cup qualification	Luxembourg	0–3	Republic of Ireland	Luxembourg, Luxembourg
20:45 UTC+1		Report	Duffy 67'; Ogbene 75'; Robinson 88'	Stadium: Stade de Luxembourg; Attendance: 9,268; Referee: Tamás Bognár (Hungary)

=== 2022 ===
25 March 2022 Friendly	Luxembourg	1–3	Northern Ireland	Luxembourg, Luxembourg
19:15 UTC+1	Da Graça 58'	Report	Magennis 16'; Davis 83'; Whyte 85'	Stadium: Stade de Luxembourg; Attendance: 4,540; Referee: Daniel Schlager (Germany)

29 March 2022 Friendly	Bosnia and Herzegovina	1–0	Luxembourg	Zenica, Bosnia and Herzegovina
20:45 UTC+2	Džeko 86'	Report		Stadium: Bilino Polje Stadium; Attendance: 6,000; Referee: David Šmajc (Slovenia)

4 June 2022 2022–23 Nations League	Lithuania	0–2	Luxembourg	Vilnius, Lithuania
19:00 UTC+3		Report	Sinani 44', 78'	Stadium: LFF Stadium; Attendance: 3,009; Referee: David Fuxman (Israel)

7 June 2022 2022–23 Nations League	Faroe Islands	0–1	Luxembourg	Tórshavn, Faroe Islands
19:45 UTC+1		Report	Rodrigues 74' (pen.)	Stadium: Tórsvøllur; Attendance: 2,313; Referee: Rob Hennessy (Ireland)

11 June 2022 2022–23 Nations League	Luxembourg	0–2	Turkey	Luxembourg, Luxembourg
20:45 UTC+2		Report	Çalhanoğlu 37' (pen.); Dursun 76'	Stadium: Stade de Luxembourg; Attendance: 9,374; Referee: António Nobre (Portugal)

14 June 2022 2022–23 Nations League	Luxembourg	2–2	Faroe Islands	Luxembourg, Luxembourg
20:45 UTC+2	Rodrigues 12' (pen.); Barreiro 49'	Report	Bjartalíð 56', 59'	Stadium: Stade de Luxembourg; Attendance: 5,325; Referee: Michael Fabbri (Italy)

22 September 2022 2022–23 Nations League	Turkey	3–3	Luxembourg	Istanbul, Turkey
21:45 UTC+3	Ünder 16' (pen.); Chanot 39' (o.g.); Yüksek 87'	Report	Da Graça 8'; Sinani 37'; Rodrigues 69'	Stadium: Başakşehir Fatih Terim Stadium; Attendance: 12,708; Referee: Tobias Stieler (Germany)

25 September 2022 2022–23 Nations League	Luxembourg	1–0	Lithuania	Luxembourg, Luxembourg
20:45 UTC+2	Rodrigues 89'	Report		Stadium: Stade de Luxembourg; Attendance: 5,340; Referee: Giorgi Kruashvili (Georgia)

17 November 2022 Friendly	Luxembourg	2–2	Hungary	Luxembourg, Luxembourg
20:00 UTC+1	G. Rodrigues 7' (pen.); Curci 77'	Report	A. Szalai 25'; A. Németh 67'	Stadium: Stade de Luxembourg; Attendance: 3,571; Referee: Jonathan Lardot (Belgium)

20 November 2022 Friendly	Luxembourg	0–0	Bulgaria	Luxembourg, Luxembourg
15:00 UTC+1		Report		Stadium: Stade de Luxembourg; Attendance: 4,718; Referee: Manfredas Lukjančukas (Lithuania)

=== 2023 ===
23 March 2023 UEFA Euro 2024 qualifying	Slovakia	0–0	Luxembourg	Trnava, Slovakia
20:45 UTC+2		Report		Stadium: Štadión Antona Malatinského; Attendance: 3,523; Referee: Rade Obrenovič (Slovenia)

26 March 2023 UEFA Euro 2024 qualifying	Luxembourg	0–6	Portugal	Luxembourg, Luxembourg
20:45 UTC+2		Report	Ronaldo 9', 31'; João Félix 15'; B. Silva 18'; Otávio 77'; Leão 88'	Stadium: Stade de Luxembourg; Attendance: 9,231; Referee: Radu Petrescu (Romania)

9 June 2023 Friendly	Luxembourg	0–1	Malta	Luxembourg, Luxembourg
20:15 UTC+2		Report	Nwoko 64'	Stadium: Stade de Luxembourg; Attendance: 4,028; Referee: Eldorjan Hamiti (Albania)

17 June 2023 UEFA Euro 2024 qualifying	Luxembourg	2–0	Liechtenstein	Luxembourg, Luxembourg
15:00 UTC+2	Sinani 59'; Rodrigues 89'	Report		Stadium: Stade de Luxembourg; Attendance: 6,806; Referee: Oleksii Derevinskyi (Ukraine)

20 June 2023 UEFA Euro 2024 qualifying	Bosnia and Herzegovina	0–2	Luxembourg	Zenica, Bosnia and Herzegovina
20:45 UTC+2		Report	Borges Sanches 4'; Sinani 74'	Stadium: Bilino Polje; Attendance: 8,600; Referee: Gal Leibovitz (Israel)

8 September 2023 UEFA Euro 2024 qualifying	Luxembourg	3–1	Iceland	Luxembourg, Luxembourg
20:45 UTC+2	Chanot 9' (pen.); Sanches 70'; Sinani 89'	Report	Haraldsson 88'	Stadium: Stade de Luxembourg; Attendance: 7,427; Referee: Goga Kikacheishvili (Georgia)

11 September 2023 UEFA Euro 2024 qualifying	Portugal	9–0	Luxembourg	Faro/Loulé, Portugal
19:45 UTC+1	Inácio 12', 45+4'; Ramos 18', 34'; Jota 57', 77'; Horta 67'; Fernandes 83'; Félix 88'	Report		Stadium: Estádio Algarve; Attendance: 18,932; Referee: John Brooks (England)

13 October 2023 UEFA Euro 2024 qualifying	Iceland	1–1	Luxembourg	Reykjavík, Iceland
18:45 UTC+0	Óskarsson 23'	Report	Rodrigues 46'	Stadium: Laugardalsvöllur; Attendance: 4,568; Referee: Sebastian Gishamer (Austria)

16 October 2023 UEFA Euro 2024 qualifying	Luxembourg	0–1	Slovakia	Luxembourg, Luxembourg
20:45 UTC+2		Report	Ďuriš 77'	Stadium: Stade de Luxembourg; Attendance: 9,386; Referee: José María Sánchez Martínez (Spain)

16 November 2023 UEFA Euro 2024 qualifying	Luxembourg	4–1	Bosnia and Herzegovina	Luxembourg, Luxembourg
20:45 UTC+1	Olesen 6'; Rodrigues 30' (pen.), 90+5'; Mujakić 55' (o.g.)	Report	Gojković 90+3'	Stadium: Stade de Luxembourg; Attendance: 8,520; Referee: Andris Treimanis (Latvia)

19 November 2023 UEFA Euro 2024 qualifying	Liechtenstein	0–1	Luxembourg	Vaduz, Liechtenstein
20:45 UTC+1		Report	G. Rodrigues 69'	Stadium: Rheinpark Stadion; Attendance: 2,241; Referee: Stéphanie Frappart (France)

=== 2024 ===
21 March 2024 UEFA Euro 2024 qualifying	Georgia	2–0	Luxembourg	Tbilisi, Georgia
21:00 UTC+4	Zivzivadze 40', 63'	Report		Stadium: Boris Paichadze Dinamo Arena; Attendance: 51,404; Referee: José María Sánchez Martínez (Spain)

26 March 2024 Friendly	Luxembourg	2–1	Kazakhstan	Luxembourg, Luxembourg
20:45 UTC+1	Sinani 45'; Rodrigues 24'	Report	Sadybekov 2'	Stadium: Stade de Luxembourg; Attendance: 8,720; Referee: Christian Dingert (Germany)

5 June 2024 Friendly	France	3–0	Luxembourg	Longeville-lès-Metz, France
21:00 UTC+2	Kolo Muani 43'; Clauss 70'; Mbappé 85'	Report		Stadium: Stade Saint-Symphorien; Attendance: 25,590; Referee: Lawrence Visser (Belgium)

8 June 2024 Friendly	Belgium	3–0	Luxembourg	Brussels, Belgium
20:00 UTC+2	Lukaku 42' (pen.), 57'; Trossard 81'	Report		Stadium: King Baudouin Stadium; Attendance: 35,287; Referee: Paweł Raczkowski (Poland)

5 September 2024 2024–25 Nations League	Northern Ireland	2–0	Luxembourg	Belfast, Northern Ireland
19:45 UTC+1	McNair 11'; Ballard 16'	Report		Stadium: Windsor Park; Attendance: 17,213; Referee: Marian Barbu (Romania)

8 September 2024 2024–25 Nations League	Luxembourg	0–1	Belarus	Luxembourg, Luxembourg
15:00 UTC+2		Report	Gromyko 76'	Stadium: Stade de Luxembourg; Attendance: 6,820; Referee: Lawrence Visser (Belgium)

12 October 2024 2024–25 Nations League	Bulgaria	0–0	Luxembourg	Plovdiv, Bulgaria
19:00 UTC+3		Report		Stadium: Stadion Hristo Botev; Attendance: 15,800; Referee: David Šmajc (Slovenia)

15 October 2024 2024–25 Nations League	Belarus	1–1	Luxembourg	Zalaegerszeg, Hungary
20:45 UTC+2	Politevich 54'	Report	Rodrigues 78' (pen.)	Stadium: ZTE Arena; Attendance: 0 Referee: Atilla Karaoglan (Turkey)

15 November 2024 2024–25 Nations League	Luxembourg	0–1	Bulgaria	Luxembourg, Luxembourg
20:45 UTC+1		Report	Kraev 23'	Stadium: Stade de Luxembourg; Attendance: 8,307; Referee: Juri Frischer (Estonia)

18 November 2024 2024–25 Nations League	Luxembourg	2–2	Northern Ireland	Luxembourg, Luxembourg
20:45 UTC+1	Korać 72'; Rodrigues 75'	Report	Price 19'; Bradley 50'	Stadium: Stade de Luxembourg; Attendance: 6,870; Referee: Elchin Masiyev (Azerbaijan)

=== 2025 ===
22 March 2025 Friendly	Luxembourg	1–0	Sweden	Luxembourg, Luxembourg
18:00 UTC+1	Korać 23'	Report		Stadium: Stade de Luxembourg; Attendance: 9,214; Referee: Luca Cibelli (Switzerland)

25 March 2025 Friendly	Switzerland	3–1	Luxembourg	St. Gallen, Switzerland
20:45 UTC+1	Vargas 9', 29'; Embolo 12' (pen.)	Report	Sinani 89' (pen.)	Stadium: Kybunpark; Attendance: 8,363; Referee: Enea Jorgji (Albania)

6 June 2025 Friendly	Luxembourg	0–1	Slovenia	Luxembourg, Luxembourg
20:15 UTC+2		Report	Svetlin 44'	Stadium: Stade de Luxembourg; Attendance: 7,508; Referee: Matthew De Gabriele (Malta)

10 June 2025 Friendly	Luxembourg	0–0	Republic of Ireland	Luxembourg, Luxembourg
20:45 UTC+1		Report		Stadium: Stade de Luxembourg; Attendance: 6,312; Referee: Stefan Ebner (Austria)

4 September 2025 2026 FIFA World Cup qualification	Luxembourg	1–3	Northern Ireland	Luxembourg, Luxembourg
20:45 UTC+2	Dardari 30'	Report	Reid 7'; S. Charles 46'; Devenny 69'	Stadium: Stade de Luxembourg; Attendance: 9,214; Referee: Andris Treimanis (Latvia)

7 September 2025 2026 FIFA World Cup qualification	Luxembourg	0–1	Slovakia	Luxembourg, Luxembourg
20:45 UTC+2		Report	Rigo 90'	Stadium: Stade de Luxembourg; Attendance: 8,487; Referee: Nicholas Walsh (Scotland)

10 October 2025 2026 FIFA World Cup qualification	Germany	4–0	Luxembourg	Sinsheim, Germany
20:45 UTC+2	Raum 12'; Kimmich 21' (pen.), 50'; Gnabry 48'	Report		Stadium: PreZero Arena; Attendance: 25,249; Referee: Nenad Minaković (Serbia)

13 October 2025 2026 FIFA World Cup qualification	Slovakia	2–0	Luxembourg	Trnava, Slovakia
20:45 UTC+2	Obert 55'; Schranz 72'	Report		Stadium: Anton Malatinský Stadium; Attendance: 13,010; Referee: Rade Obrenović (Slovenia)

14 November 2025 2026 FIFA World Cup qualification	Luxembourg	0–2	Germany	Luxembourg, Luxembourg
20:45 UTC+1		Report	Woltemade 49', 69'	Stadium: Stade de Luxembourg; Attendance: 9,214; Referee: John Brooks (England)

17 November 2025 2026 FIFA World Cup qualification	Northern Ireland	1–0	Luxembourg	Belfast, Northern Ireland
19:45 UTC+0	Donley 44' (pen.)	Report		Stadium: Windsor Park; Attendance: 18,037; Referee: Kristo Tohver (Estonia)

=== 2026 ===
26 March 2026 2024-25 Nations League Playoff C/D	Malta	0–2	Luxembourg	Ta' Qali, Malta
18:00 UTC+1		Report	V. Thill 47'; Olesen 90+3'	Stadium: National Stadium; Attendance: 9,467; Referee: Irfan Peljto (Bosnia and Herzegovina)

31 March 2026 2024-25 Nations League Playoff C/D	Luxembourg	3–0 (5–0 agg.)	Malta	Luxembourg City, Luxembourg
18:00 UTC+1	V. Thill 20'; Sinani 50'; Moreira 70'	Report		Stadium: Stade de Luxembourg; Attendance: 9,113; Referee: Daniel Siebert (Germany)

3 June 2026 Friendly	Luxembourg	0–1	Italy	Luxembourg City, Luxembourg
20:45 UTC+2		Report	Esposito 49'	Stadium: Stade de Luxembourg; Attendance: 9,214; Referee: Joey Kooij (Netherlands)

6 June 2026 Friendly	Albania	0–1	Luxembourg	Tirana, Albania
20:00 UTC+2		Report	Sinani 8'	Stadium: Arena Kombëtare; Attendance: 5,142; Referee: Genc Nuza (Kosovo)

26 September 2026 2026–27 Nations League	Bulgaria	1–2	Luxembourg	Plovdiv, Bulgaria
19:00 UTC+3	Chandarov 18'	Report	Barreiro 37'; V. Thill 65'	Stadium: Hristo Botev Stadium; Attendance: 4,300; Referee: Sander van der Eijk (Netherlands)

29 September 2026 2026–27 Nations League	Luxembourg	0–3	Iceland	Luxembourg City, Luxembourg
20:45 UTC+2		Report	Guðjohnsen 13'; Óskarsson 39'; Pálsson 73'	Stadium: Stade de Luxembourg; Attendance: 8,879; Referee: Enea Jorgji (Albania)

3 October 2026 2026–27 Nations League	Estonia	1–0	Luxembourg	Tallinn, Estonia
19:00 UTC+3	Peetson 5'	Report		Stadium: Lilleküla Stadium; Attendance: 7,211; Referee: Paweł Raczkowski (Poland)

6 October 2026 2026–27 Nations League	Luxembourg	0–2	Bulgaria	Luxembourg City, Luxembourg
20:45 UTC+2		Report	Balov 19'; Iliev 34'	Stadium: Stade de Luxembourg; Attendance: 8,027; Referee: Andris Treimanis (Latvia)

13 November 2026 2026–27 Nations League	Luxembourg	0–1	Estonia	Luxembourg City, Luxembourg
20:45 UTC+1		Report	Paskotši 42'	Stadium: Stade de Luxembourg; Attendance: 9,214; Referee: Ishmael Barbara (Malta)

16 November 2026 2026–27 Nations League	Iceland	3–0	Luxembourg	Reykjavík, Iceland
17:00 UTC+0	Willumsson 25'; Guðjohnsen 37' (pen.); Ellertsson 50'	Report		Stadium: Laugardalsvöllur; Attendance: 2,644; Referee: Marian Barbu (Romania)

== Head to head record ==
As of 16 November 2026

Head to head records
Opponent	P	W	D	L	GF	GA	W%	D%	L%
Albania	1	1	0	0	1	0	100	0	0
Austria	1	0	0	1	0	3	0	0	100
Azerbaijan	4	3	1	0	7	3	75	25	0
Belarus	2	0	1	1	1	2	0	50	50
Belgium	1	0	0	1	0	3	0	0	100
Bosnia and Herzegovina	3	2	0	1	6	2	66.67	0	33.33
Bulgaria	5	1	2	2	2	4	20	40	40
Cyprus	2	1	0	1	3	2	50	0	50
Estonia	2	0	0	2	0	2	0	0	100
France	1	0	0	1	0	3	0	0	0
Faroe Islands	2	1	1	0	3	2	50	50	0
Georgia	1	0	0	1	0	2	0	0	100
Germany	2	0	0	2	0	6	0	0	100
Hungary	1	0	1	0	2	2	0	100	0
Iceland	4	1	1	2	4	8	25	25	50
Italy	1	0	0	1	0	1	0	0	100
Kazakhstan	1	1	0	0	2	1	100	0	0
Liechtenstein	3	2	0	1	4	2	66.67	0	33.33
Lithuania	2	2	0	0	3	0	100	0	0
Malta	3	2	0	1	5	1	66.67	0	33.33
Montenegro	2	1	0	1	2	2	50	0	50
Northern Ireland	5	0	1	4	4	11	0	20	80
Norway	1	0	0	1	0	1	0	0	100
Portugal	4	0	0	4	1	23	0	0	100
Qatar	2	0	1	1	1	2	0	50	100
Republic of Ireland	3	1	1	1	1	3	33.33	33.33	33.33
Scotland	1	0	0	1	0	1	0	0	100
Serbia	2	0	0	2	1	5	0	0	100
Slovakia	4	0	1	3	0	4	0	25	75
Slovenia	1	0	0	1	0	1	0	0	100
Sweden	1	1	0	0	1	0	100	0	0
Switzerland	1	0	0	1	1	3	0	0	100
Turkey	2	0	1	1	3	5	0	50	50
Total	71	20	12	39	58	110	28.17	16.9	54.93
