= Azerbaijan national football team results (2020–present) =

This article provides details of international football games played by the Azerbaijan national football team from 2020 to present.

== Results ==
Key
| Win |
| Draw |
| Defeat |

=== 2020 ===
| 26 March 2020 Friendly | Liechtenstein | Cancelled | Azerbaijan | Ta' Qali, Malta |

| 30 March 2020 Friendly | Malta | Cancelled | Azerbaijan | Ta' Qali, Malta |

| 5 September 2020 2020–21 Nations League | Azerbaijan | 1–2 | Luxembourg | Baku, Azerbaijan |
| 20:00 UTC+4 | Sheydayev 43' | Report | Krivotsyuk 48' (o.g.); Rodrigues 72' (pen.) | Stadium: Olympic Stadium; Attendance: 0 (Note: Due to the COVID-19 pandemic in Europe, all matches scheduled for September 2020 were played behind closed doors.); Referee: Chris Kavanagh (England) |

| 8 September 2020 2020–21 Nations League | Cyprus | 0–1 | Azerbaijan | Nicosia, Cyprus |
| 21:45 UTC+3 | | Report | Medvedev 29' | Stadium: GSP Stadium; Attendance: 0 Referee: Filip Glova (Slovakia) |

| 10 October 2020 2020–21 Nations League | Montenegro | 2–0 | Azerbaijan | Podgorica, Montenegro |
| 15:00 UTC+2 | Jovetić 9'; Ivanović 71' | Report | | Stadium: City Stadium; Attendance: 0 Referee: Ricardo de Burgos Bengoetxea (Spain) |

| 13 October 2020 2020–21 Nations League | Azerbaijan | 0–0 | Cyprus | Elbasan, Albania |
| 20:00 UTC+2 | | Report | | Stadium: Elbasan Arena (Note: The Azerbaijan v Cyprus match, originally scheduled to be played at Olympic Stadium, Baku, was later moved to the neutral Elbasan Arena, Elbasan, due to the Nagorno-Karabakh conflict.); Attendance: 0 Referee: Fran Jović (Croatia) |

| 11 November 2020 Friendly | Slovenia | 0–0 | Azerbaijan | Ljubljana, Slovenia |
| 20:45 UTC+1 | | Report | | Stadium: Stožice Stadium; Attendance: 0 Referee: Ferenc Karakó (Hungary) |

| 14 November 2020 2020–21 Nations League | Azerbaijan | 0–0 | Montenegro | Zaprešić, Croatia (Note: The Azerbaijan v Montenegro match, originally scheduled to be played at Olympic Stadium, Baku, was later moved to the neutral Ivan Laljak-Ivić Stadium, Zaprešić, as UEFA announced on 20 October 2020 to temporarily suspend all UEFA matches taking place in Armenia and Azerbaijan until further notice due to the Nagorno-Karabakh conflict.) |
| 18:00 UTC+1 | | Report | | Stadium: Ivan Laljak-Ivić Stadium; Attendance: 0 Referee: Sergei Ivanov (Russia) |

| 17 November 2020 2020–21 Nations League | Luxembourg | 0–0 | Azerbaijan | Luxembourg City, Luxembourg |
| 20:45 UTC+1 | | Report | | Stadium: Stade Josy Barthel; Attendance: 100; Referee: Felix Zwayer (Germany) |

=== 2021 ===
| 24 March 2021 2022 FIFA World Cup qualification | Portugal | 1–0 | Azerbaijan | Turin, Italy |
| 19:45 UTC+1 | Medvedev 37' (o.g.) | Report | | Stadium: Juventus Stadium; Attendance: 0 Referee: Daniel Siebert (Germany) |

| 27 March 2021 Friendly | Qatar | 2–1 | Azerbaijan | Debrecen, Hungary |
| 18:00 UTC+1 | Al-Haydos 55' (pen.), 58' | Report | Sheydayev 16' (pen.) | Stadium: Nagyerdei Stadion; Attendance: 0 Referee: Ivan Kružliak (Slovakia) |

| 30 March 2021 2022 FIFA World Cup qualification | Azerbaijan | 1–2 | Serbia | Baku, Azerbaijan |
| 20:00 UTC+4 | Mahmudov 59' (pen.) | Report | A. Mitrović 16', 81' | Stadium: Olympic Stadium; Attendance: 0 Referee: Roi Reinshreiber (Israel) |

| 27 May 2021 Friendly | Turkey | 2–1 | Azerbaijan | Alanya, Turkey |
| 20:00 UTC+3 | Dervişoğlu 34'; Ayhan 44' | Report | Mahmudov 28' | Stadium: Bahçeşehir Okulları Stadium; Attendance: 400; Referee: Genc Nuza (Kosovo) |
Note: The match was originally scheduled for 26 May 2020, but was postponed due to the COVID-19 pandemic in Turkey.

| 2 June 2021 Friendly | Belarus | 1–2 | Azerbaijan | Minsk, Belarus |
| 19:00 UTC+3 | Skavysh 56' | Report | B. Guseynov 73'; Sheydayev 90+1' | Stadium: Dinamo Stadium; Attendance: 4,120; Referee: Dumitru Muntean (Moldova) |

| 6 June 2021 Friendly | Moldova | 1–0 | Azerbaijan | Chișinău, Moldova |
| 19:00 UTC+3 | Damașcan 8' | Report | | Stadium: Zimbru Stadium; Attendance: 2,130; Referee: Marian Barbu (Romania) |

| 1 September 2021 2022 FIFA World Cup qualification | Luxembourg | 2–1 | Azerbaijan | Luxembourg City, Luxembourg |
| 20:45 UTC+2 | Pinto 8'; Rodrigues 28' (pen.) | Report | Mahmudov 67' | Stadium: Stade de Luxembourg; Attendance: 2,000; Referee: Irfan Peljto (Bosnia and Herzegovina) |

| 4 September 2021 2022 FIFA World Cup qualification | Republic of Ireland | 1–1 | Azerbaijan | Dublin, Republic of Ireland |
| 17:00 UTC+1 | Duffy 87' | Report | Mahmudov 45+1' | Stadium: Aviva Stadium; Attendance: 21,287; Referee: Jérôme Brisard (France) |

| 7 September 2021 2022 FIFA World Cup qualification | Azerbaijan | 0–3 | Portugal | Baku, Azerbaijan |
| 20:00 UTC+4 | | Report | B. Silva 26'; A. Silva 31'; Jota 75' | Stadium: Olympic Stadium; Attendance: 20,574; Referee: Marco Guida (Italy) |

| 9 October 2021 2022 FIFA World Cup qualification | Azerbaijan | 0–3 | Republic of Ireland | Baku, Azerbaijan |
| 20:00 UTC+4 | | Report | Robinson 7', 39'; Ogbene 90' | Stadium: Olympic Stadium; Attendance: 6,852; Referee: Espen Eskås (Norway) |

| 12 October 2021 2022 FIFA World Cup qualification | Serbia | 3–1 | Azerbaijan | Belgrade, Serbia |
| 20:45 UTC+2 | Vlahović 30' (pen.), 53'; Tadić 83' (pen.) | Report | Mahmudov 45+2' | Stadium: Rajko Mitić Stadium; Attendance: 5,890; Referee: Erik Lambrechts (Belgium) |

| 11 November 2021 2022 FIFA World Cup qualification | Azerbaijan | 1–3 | Luxembourg | Baku, Azerbaijan |
| 21:00 UTC+4 | Salahli 82' | Report | Rodrigues 67', 90+1'; S. Thill 78' | Stadium: Olympic Stadium; Attendance: 2,986; Referee: Manuel Schüttengruber (Austria) |

| 14 November 2021 Friendly | Azerbaijan | 2–2 | Qatar | Baku, Azerbaijan |
| 21:00 UTC+4 | Mahmudov 37' (pen.), 67' | Report | Ali 23', 78' | Stadium: Olympic Stadium; Attendance: 1,537; Referee: Donatas Rumšas (Lithuania) |

=== 2022 ===
| 25 March 2022 Friendly | Malta | 1–0 | Azerbaijan | Ta' Qali, Malta |
| 19:00 UTC+1 | Degabriele 55' | Report | | Stadium: National Stadium; Referee: César Soto Grado (Spain) |

| 29 March 2022 Friendly | Azerbaijan | 0–1 | Latvia | Ta' Qali, Malta |
| 13:00 UTC+2 | | Report | Gutkovskis 85' | Stadium: National Stadium; Referee: Trustin Farrugia Cann (Malta) |

| 3 June 2022 2022–23 Nations League | Kazakhstan | 2–0 | Azerbaijan | Nur-Sultan, Kazakhstan |
| 20:00 UTC+6 | Aymbetov 50', 60' | Report | | Stadium: Astana Arena; Attendance: 19,823; Referee: István Vad (Hungary) |

| 6 June 2022 2022–23 Nations League | Belarus | 0–0 | Azerbaijan | Novi Sad, Serbia |
| 20:45 UTC+2 | | Report | | Stadium: Karađorđe Stadium; Attendance: 0 Referee: Mohammed Al-Hakim (Sweden) |

| 10 June 2022 2022–23 Nations League | Azerbaijan | 0–1 | Slovakia | Baku, Azerbaijan |
| 20:00 UTC+4 | | Report | Weiss 81' | Stadium: Dalga Arena; Attendance: 2,967; Referee: Donatas Rumšas (Lithuania) |

| 13 June 2022 2022–23 Nations League | Azerbaijan | 2–0 | Belarus | Baku, Azerbaijan |
| 20:00 UTC+4 | Emreli 76'; Sheydayev 90+3' | Report | | Stadium: Dalga Arena; Attendance: 2,330; Referee: Anastasios Papapetrou (Greece) |

| 22 September 2022 2022–23 Nations League | Slovakia | 1–2 | Azerbaijan | Trnava, Slovakia |
| 20:45 UTC+2 | Jirka 90+3' (pen.) | Report | Dadashov 44'; Haghverdi 90+5' | Stadium: Anton Malatinský Stadium; Attendance: 2.875; Referee: Willie Collum (Scotland) |

| 25 September 2022 2022–23 Nations League | Azerbaijan | 3–0 | Kazakhstan | Baku, Azerbaijan |
| 20:00 UTC+4 | Marochkin 66' (o.g.); Ozobić 74'; Nuriyev 90+1' | Report | | Stadium: Dalga Arena; Attendance: 2,950; Referee: Harm Osmers (Germany) |

| 16 November 2022 Friendly | Moldova | 1–2 | Azerbaijan | Chişinău, Moldova |
| 18:00 UTC+3 | Moțpan 90' | Report | Mahmudov 28'; Isayev 43' | Stadium: Zimbru Stadium; Attendance: 3,742; Referee: Denys Shurman (Ukraine) |

| 20 November 2022 Friendly | North Macedonia | 1–3 | Azerbaijan | Skopje, North Macedonia |
| 14:00 UTC+1 | Bardhi 25' (pen.) | Report | Jafarguliyev 35'; Qurbanlı 65'; Sheydayev 88' | Stadium: Toše Proeski Arena; Attendance: 1,000; Referee: Enea Jorgji (Albania) |

=== 2023 ===
| 24 March 2023 UEFA Euro 2024 qualifying | Austria | 4–1 | Azerbaijan | Linz, Austria |
| 20:45 UTC+1 | Sabitzer 28', 50'; Gregoritsch 29'; Baumgartner 69' | Report | Mahmudov 64' | Stadium: Raiffeisen Arena; Attendance: 16,500; Referee: Bartosz Frankowski (Poland) |

| 27 March 2023 UEFA Euro 2024 qualifying | Sweden | 5–0 | Azerbaijan | Solna, Sweden |
| 20:45 UTC+2 | Forsberg 38'; Mustafazadə 65' (o.g.); Gyökeres 79'; Karlsson 88'; Elanga 89' | Report | | Stadium: Friends Arena; Attendance: 23,674; Referee: Stéphanie Frappart (France) |

| 17 June 2023 UEFA Euro 2024 qualifying | Azerbaijan | 1–1 | Estonia | Baku, Azerbaijan |
| 20:00 UTC+4 | Krivotsyuk 62' | Report | Sappinen 27' | Stadium: Dalga Arena; Attendance: 3,900; Referee: Ondřej Berka (Czech Republic) |

| 9 September 2023 UEFA Euro 2024 qualifying | Azerbaijan | 0–1 | Belgium | Baku, Azerbaijan |
| 17:00 UTC+4 | | Report | Carrasco 38' | Stadium: Dalga Arena; Attendance: 4,500; Referee: Nenad Minaković (Serbia) |

| 12 September 2023 Friendly | Azerbaijan | 2–1 | Jordan | Baku, Azerbaijan |
| 18:00 UTC+3 | Makhmudov 45+1' (pen.); Dadashov 79' | Report | Al-Rashdan 57' | Stadium: Dalga Arena; Referee: Arda Kardeşler (Turkey) |

| 13 October 2023 UEFA Euro 2024 qualifying | Estonia | 0–2 | Azerbaijan | Tallinn, Estonia |
| 19:00 UTC+3 | | Report | Bayramov 9'; Sheydayev 45+4' (pen.) | Stadium: Lilleküla Stadium; Attendance: 5,652; Referee: Robert Schröder (Germany) |

| 16 October 2023 UEFA Euro 2024 qualifying | Azerbaijan | 0–1 | Austria | Baku, Azerbaijan |
| 20:00 UTC+4 | | Report | Sabitzer 48' (pen.) | Stadium: Tofiq Bahramov Republican Stadium; Attendance: 4,446; Referee: Aristotelis Diamantopoulos (Greece) |

| 16 November 2023 UEFA Euro 2024 qualifying | Azerbaijan | 3–0 | Sweden | Baku, Azerbaijan |
| 21:00 UTC+4 | Mahmudov 3', 89'; Dadashov 6' | Report | | Stadium: Tofiq Bahramov Republican Stadium; Attendance: 5,570; Referee: Esther Staubli (Switzerland) |

| 19 November 2023 UEFA Euro 2024 qualifying | Belgium | 5–0 | Azerbaijan | Brussels, Belgium |
| 18:00 UTC+1 | Lukaku 17', 26', 30', 37'; Trossard 90' | Report | | Stadium: King Baudouin Stadium; Attendance: 30,276; Referee: Gergő Bogár (Hungary) |

=== 2024 ===
| 22 March 2024 2024 FIFA Series | Azerbaijan | 1–0 | Mongolia | Baku, Azerbaijan |
| 20:00 UTC+4 | Mustafazadə 90+1' | Report | | Stadium: Tofiq Bahramov Republican Stadium; Attendance: 3,875; Referee: Zorbay Küçük (Turkey) |

| 25 March 2024 2024 FIFA Series | Azerbaijan | 1–1 | Bulgaria | Baku, Azerbaijan |
| 18:00 UTC+4 | Qurbanlı 87' | Report | Krastev 59' | Stadium: Tofiq Bahramov Republican Stadium; Attendance: 3,220; Referee: Kristo Tohver (Estonia) |

| 7 June 2024 Friendly | Albania | 3–1 | Azerbaijan | Szombathely, Hungary |
| 19:00 UTC+2 | Bajrami 12'; Manaj 81'; Laçi 88' | Report | Qurbanlı 90' | Stadium: Haladás Sportkomplexum; Referee: Mihály Káprály (Hungary) |

| 11 June 2024 Friendly | Azerbaijan | 3–2 | Kazakhstan | Szombathely, Hungary |
| 16:00 UTC+2 | Emreli 42'; Mahmudov 51' (pen.); Bayramov 73' | Report | Vorogovsky 2'; Samorodov 28' | Stadium: Haladás Sportkomplexum; Referee: Bence Csonka (Hungary) |

| 5 September 2024 2024–25 Nations League | Azerbaijan | 1–3 | Sweden | Baku, Azerbaijan |
| 20:00 UTC+4 | Dadashov 82' | Report | Isak 65', 71'; Gyökeres 80' (pen.) | Stadium: Tofiq Bahramov Republican Stadium; Attendance: 9,450; Referee: Balázs Berke (Hungary) |

| 8 September 2024 2024–25 Nations League | Slovakia | 2–0 | Azerbaijan | Košice, Slovakia |
| 18:00 UTC+2 | Duda 22' (pen.); Strelec 26' | Report | | Stadium: Košická futbalová aréna Attendance: 11,435; Referee: Damian Sylwestrzak (Poland) |

| 11 October 2024 2024–25 Nations League | Estonia | 3–1 | Azerbaijan | Tallinn, Estonia |
| 19:00 UTC+3 | Yakovlev 32'; Sinyavskiy 45+2'; Shein 71' | Report | Bayramov 45+1' (pen.) | Stadium: Lilleküla Stadium; Attendance: 6,034; Referee: Rob Harvey (Republic of Ireland) |

| 14 October 2024 2024–25 Nations League | Azerbaijan | 1–3 | Slovakia | Baku, Azerbaijan |
| 20:00 UTC+4 | Bayramov 38' | Report | Mammadov 15' (o.g.); Haraslín 75'; Ďuriš 86' | Stadium: Tofiq Bahramov Republican Stadium; Attendance: 4,269; Referee: Rohit Saggi (Norway) |

| 16 November 2024 2024–25 Nations League | Azerbaijan | 0–0 | Estonia | Gabala, Azerbaijan |
| 18:00 UTC+4 | | Report | | Stadium: Gabala City Stadium; Attendance: 1,600; Referee: John Beaton (Scotland) |

| 19 November 2024 2024–25 Nations League | Sweden | 6–0 | Azerbaijan | Solna, Sweden |
| 20:45 UTC+1 | Kulusevski 10', 57'; Gyökeres 26', 37', 58', 70' | Report | | Stadium: Strawberry Arena; Attendance: 10,127; Referee: Paweł Raczkowski (Poland) |

=== 2025 ===
| 22 March 2025 Friendly | Azerbaijan | 0–3 | Haiti | Sumgayit, Azerbaijan |
| 21:45 UTC+4 | | Report | Pierrot 9', 63'; Jean Jacques 83' | Stadium: Sumgayit City Stadium; Attendance: 3,000; Referee: Kadir Sağlam (Turkey) |

| 25 March 2025 Friendly | Azerbaijan | 0–2 | Belarus | Masazır, Azerbaijan |
| 21:45 UTC+4 | | Report | Zabelin 59'; Demchenko 78' | Stadium: Bank Respublika Arena; Attendance: 2,452; Referee: Aleko Aptsiauri (Georgia) |

| 7 June 2025 Friendly | Latvia | 0–0 | Azerbaijan | Riga, Latvia |
| 16:00 UTC+3 | | Report | | Stadium: Skonto Stadium; Attendance: 4,594; Referee: Trustin Farrugia Cann (Malta) |

| 10 June 2025 Friendly | Azerbaijan | 1–2 | Hungary | Baku, Azerbaijan |
| 20:00 UTC+4 | Dadashov 7' | Report | Varga 5'; Szoboszlai 33' | Stadium: Dalga Arena; Attendance: 2,830; Referee: Viktor Shimusik (Belarus) |

| 5 September 2025 2026 FIFA World Cup qualification | Iceland | 5–0 | Azerbaijan | Reykjavík, Iceland |
| 18:45 UTC+0 | Pálsson 45+2'; Jóhannesson 47', 56'; Guðmundsson 66'; Hlynsson 73' | Report | | Stadium: Laugardalsvöllur; Attendance: 4,021; Referee: Sander van der Eijk (Netherlands) |

| 9 September 2025 2026 FIFA World Cup qualification | Azerbaijan | 1–1 | Ukraine | Baku, Azerbaijan |
| 20:00 UTC+4 | Makhmudov 72' (pen.) | Report | Sudakov 51' | Stadium: Tofiq Bahramov Republican Stadium; Attendance: 8,450; Referee: Vassilis Fotias (Greece) |

| 10 October 2025 2026 FIFA World Cup qualification | France | 3–0 | Azerbaijan | Paris, France |
| 20:45 UTC+2 | Mbappé 45+2'; Rabiot 69'; Thauvin 84' | Report | | Stadium: Parc des Princes; Attendance: 40,150; Referee: Rohit Saggi (Norway) |

| 13 October 2025 2026 FIFA World Cup qualification | Ukraine | 2–1 | Azerbaijan | Kraków, Poland |
| 20:45 UTC+2 | Hutsulyak 30'; Malinovskyi 64' | Report | Mykolenko 45+3' (o.g.) | Stadium: Cracovia Stadium; Attendance: 6,995; Referee: Sebastian Gishamer (Austria) |

| 13 November 2025 2026 FIFA World Cup qualification | Azerbaijan | 0–2 | Iceland | Baku, Azerbaijan |
| 21:00 UTC+4 | | Report | Guðmundsson 20'; Ingason 39' | Stadium: Neftçi Arena; Attendance: 4,300; Referee: Nikola Dabanović (Montenegro) |

| 16 November 2025 2026 FIFA World Cup qualification | Azerbaijan | 1–3 | France | Baku, Azerbaijan |
| 21:00 UTC+4 | Dadaşov 4' | Report | Mateta 17'; Akliouche 30'; Magomedaliyev 45' (o.g.) | Stadium: Tofiq Bahramov Republican Stadium; Attendance: 29,700; Referee: Andris Treimanis (Latvia) |

=== 2026 ===
| 27 March 2026 2026 FIFA Series | Azerbaijan | 6–1 | Saint Lucia | Sumgayit, Azerbaijan |
| 19:10 UTC+4 | Mahmudov 2' (pen.); Sadıxov 21'; Qurbanlı 37'; T. Bayramov 64'; Isgandarli 86'; Akhmedzade 89' | Report | Phillip 52' (pen.) | Stadium: Sumgayit City Stadium; Attendance: 1,450; Referee: Giorgi Kruashvili (Georgia) |

| 30 March 2026 2026 FIFA Series | Azerbaijan | 1–1 (9–8 p) | Sierra Leone | Sumgayit, Azerbaijan |
| 19:00 UTC+4 | Mammadov 72' | Report | Kanu 28' | Stadium: Sumgayit City Stadium; Referee: Asker Nadjafaliev (Uzbekistan) |
| | Penalties |
| | T. Bayramov (penalty scored); K. Alıyev (penalty scored); Isgandarli (penalty scored); A. Guseynov (penalty missed); Sadykhov (penalty scored); Akhmedzade (penalty scored); Khaybulayev (penalty scored); Kryvotsyuk (penalty scored); Mammadov (penalty scored); B. Guseynov (penalty scored) | | (penalty missed) A. Koroma; (penalty scored) Kaikai; (penalty scored) Gandi; (penalty scored) Kamara; (penalty scored) Quee; (penalty scored) J. Bah; (penalty scored) Kallon; (penalty scored) Jarjue Kabia; (penalty scored) N. Jalloh; (penalty missed) Turay |

| 5 June 2026 Friendly | Azerbaijan | 0–2 | Malta | Szombathely, Hungary |
| 20:00 UTC+2 | | Report | J. Mbong 65'; Satariano 86' | Stadium: Haladás Sportkomplexum; Attendance: 150; Referee: Mihály Káprály (Hungary) |

| 9 June 2026 Friendly | Azerbaijan | 2–1 | San Marino | Szombathely, Hungary |
| 20:00 UTC+2 | Dashdamirov 27'; Dadaşov 49' | Report | Nanni 9' | Stadium: Haladás Sportkomplexum; Attendance: 100; Referee: Márton Rúsz (Hungary) |

| 23 September 2026 Friendly | Azerbaijan | 1–0 | Tajikistan | Baku, Azerbaijan |
| 20:00 UTC+4 | Baklov 58' (o.g.) | Report | | Stadium: Palms Sports Arena; Referee: Roman Jitari (Moldova) |

| 27 September 2026 2026–27 Nations League | Lithuania | 1–1 | Azerbaijan | Kaunas, Lithuania |
| 16:00 UTC+3 | Kučys 9' (pen.) | Report | Emreli 14' | Stadium: Darius and Girėnas Stadium; Attendance: 7,539; Referee: Menelaos Antoniou (Cyprus) |

| 1 October 2026 2026–27 Nations League | Azerbaijan | 0–0 | Liechtenstein | Baku, Azerbaijan |
| 20:00 UTC+4 | | Report | | Stadium: Tofiq Bahramov Republican Stadium; Attendance: 4,200; Referee: Christian-Petru Ciochirca (Austria) |

| 4 October 2026 2026–27 Nations League | Azerbaijan | 1–0 | Lithuania | Baku, Azerbaijan |
| 17:00 UTC+4 | Khaybulayev 25' | Report | | Stadium: Palms Sports Arena; Attendance: 5,000; Referee: Gustavo Correia (Portugal) |

| 13 November 2026 2026–27 Nations League | Liechtenstein | 0–1 | Azerbaijan | Vaduz, Liechtenstein |
| 20:45 UTC+1 | | Report | Emreli 26' | Stadium: Rheinpark Stadion; Attendance: 1,071; Referee: Kristo Tohver (Estonia) |

| 16 November 2026 Friendly | Andorra | 1–3 | Azerbaijan | Encamp, Andorra |
| 19:00 UTC+1 | Fernández 55' | Report | Ahmadov 2'; Qurbanlı 47'; T. Bayramov 70' (pen.) | Stadium: Estadi de la FAF; Attendance: 485; Referee: José Luis Munuera Montero (Spain) |

== Head-to-head record ==
As of 16 November 2026 after the match against Andorra.

| Opponent | Pld | W | D | L | GF | GA | GD | Win % |
|---|---|---|---|---|---|---|---|---|
| Albania | 1 | 0 | 0 | 1 | 1 | 3 | −2 | .000 |
| Andorra | 1 | 1 | 0 | 0 | 3 | 1 | +2 | 1.000 |
| Austria | 2 | 0 | 0 | 2 | 1 | 5 | −4 | .000 |
| Belarus | 4 | 2 | 1 | 1 | 4 | 3 | +1 | .625 |
| Belgium | 2 | 0 | 0 | 2 | 0 | 6 | −6 | .000 |
| Bulgaria | 1 | 0 | 1 | 0 | 1 | 1 | 0 | .500 |
| Cyprus | 2 | 1 | 1 | 0 | 1 | 0 | +1 | .750 |
| Estonia | 4 | 1 | 2 | 1 | 4 | 4 | 0 | .500 |
| France | 2 | 0 | 0 | 2 | 1 | 6 | −5 | .000 |
| Haiti | 1 | 0 | 0 | 1 | 0 | 3 | −3 | .000 |
| Hungary | 1 | 0 | 0 | 1 | 1 | 2 | −1 | .000 |
| Iceland | 2 | 0 | 0 | 2 | 0 | 7 | −7 | .000 |
| Jordan | 1 | 1 | 0 | 0 | 2 | 1 | +1 | 1.000 |
| Kazakhstan | 3 | 2 | 0 | 1 | 6 | 4 | +2 | .667 |
| Latvia | 2 | 0 | 1 | 1 | 0 | 1 | −1 | .250 |
| Liechtenstein | 2 | 1 | 1 | 0 | 1 | 0 | +1 | .750 |
| Lithuania | 2 | 1 | 1 | 0 | 2 | 1 | +1 | .750 |
| Luxembourg | 4 | 0 | 1 | 3 | 3 | 7 | −4 | .125 |
| Malta | 2 | 0 | 0 | 2 | 0 | 3 | −3 | .000 |
| Moldova | 2 | 1 | 0 | 1 | 2 | 2 | 0 | .500 |
| Mongolia | 1 | 1 | 0 | 0 | 1 | 0 | +1 | 1.000 |
| Montenegro | 2 | 0 | 1 | 1 | 0 | 2 | −2 | .250 |
| North Macedonia | 1 | 1 | 0 | 0 | 3 | 1 | +2 | 1.000 |
| Portugal | 2 | 0 | 0 | 2 | 0 | 4 | −4 | .000 |
| Qatar | 2 | 0 | 1 | 1 | 3 | 4 | −1 | .250 |
| Republic of Ireland | 2 | 0 | 1 | 1 | 1 | 4 | −3 | .250 |
| Saint Lucia | 1 | 1 | 0 | 0 | 6 | 1 | +5 | 1.000 |
| San Marino | 1 | 1 | 0 | 0 | 2 | 1 | +1 | 1.000 |
| Serbia | 2 | 0 | 0 | 2 | 2 | 5 | −3 | .000 |
| Sierra Leone | 1 | 0 | 1 | 0 | 1 | 1 | 0 | .500 |
| Slovakia | 4 | 1 | 0 | 3 | 3 | 7 | −4 | .250 |
| Slovenia | 1 | 0 | 1 | 0 | 0 | 0 | 0 | .500 |
| Sweden | 4 | 1 | 0 | 3 | 4 | 14 | −10 | .250 |
| Tajikistan | 1 | 1 | 0 | 0 | 1 | 0 | +1 | 1.000 |
| Turkey | 1 | 0 | 0 | 1 | 1 | 2 | −1 | .000 |
| Ukraine | 2 | 0 | 1 | 1 | 2 | 3 | −1 | .250 |
| Total | 69 | 18 | 15 | 36 | 63 | 109 | −46 | .370 |
