= UEFA Euro 2024 qualifying Group J =

Group J of UEFA Euro 2024 qualifying was one of the ten groups to decide which teams would qualify for the UEFA Euro 2024 final tournament in Germany. Group J consisted of six teams: Bosnia and Herzegovina, Iceland, Liechtenstein, Luxembourg, Portugal and Slovakia. The teams played against each other home-and-away in a round-robin format.

The top two teams, Portugal and Slovakia, qualified directly for the final tournament. The participants of the qualifying play-offs were decided based on their performance in the 2022–23 UEFA Nations League, of which Bosnia and Herzegovina, Iceland and Luxembourg qualified for the playoffs. This meant that the only team which was eliminated after the group stage matches in this group was Liechtenstein.

Portugal won all ten of their matches, becoming the eighth national side to qualify for a European Championship with a 100% record, and the ninth instance, after France (1992 and 2004), Czech Republic (2000), Germany, Spain (both 2012), England (2016), Italy and Belgium (both 2020).

== Standings ==
Pos	Team	Pld	W	D	L	GF	GA	GD	Pts	Qualification	(Portugal)	(Slovakia)	(Luxembourg)	(Iceland)	(Bosnia and Herzegovina)	(Liechtenstein)
1	Portugal	10	10	0	0	36	2	+34	30	Qualify for final tournament	—	3–2	9–0	2–0	3–0	4–0
2	Slovakia	10	7	1	2	17	8	+9	22	Qualify for final tournament	0–1	—	0–0	4–2	2–0	3–0
3	Luxembourg	10	5	2	3	13	19	−6	17	Advance to play-offs via Nations League	0–6	0–1	—	3–1	4–1	2–0
4	Iceland	10	3	1	6	17	16	+1	10	Advance to play-offs via Nations League	0–1	1–2	1–1	—	1–0	4–0
5	Bosnia and Herzegovina	10	3	0	7	9	20	−11	9	Advance to play-offs via Nations League	0–5	1–2	0–2	3–0	—	2–1
6	Liechtenstein	10	0	0	10	1	28	−27	0		0–2	0–1	0–1	0–7	0–2	—

Source: UEFA
Rules for classification: Qualification tiebreakers

== Matches ==
The fixture list was confirmed by UEFA on 10 October 2022, the day after the draw. Times are CET/CEST, (Note: CET (UTC+1) for matches until 25 March and from 29 October (matchday 1 and 9–10), and CEST (UTC+2) for matches from 26 March to 28 October 2023 (matchday 2–8).) as listed by UEFA (local times, if different, are in parentheses).

23 March 2023
20:45

Bosnia and Herzegovina	3–0	Iceland
Krunić 14', 40'; Dedić 63'	Report

Stadion Bilino polje, Zenica
Attendance: 9,234
Referee: Donatas Rumšas (Lithuania)
23 March 2023
20:45 (19:45 UTC±0)

Portugal	4–0	Liechtenstein
Cancelo 8'; B. Silva 47'; Ronaldo 51' (pen.), 63'	Report

Estádio José Alvalade, Lisbon
Attendance: 45,378
Referee: Espen Eskås (Norway)
23 March 2023
20:45

Slovakia	0–0	Luxembourg
	Report

Anton Malatinský Stadium, Trnava
Attendance: 3,523
Referee: Rade Obrenovič (Slovenia)

26 March 2023
18:00

Liechtenstein	0–7	Iceland
	Report	Ólafsson 3'; Haraldson 38'; A. Gunnarsson 48', 68', 73' (pen.); Guðjohnsen 85'; Ellertsson 87'

Rheinpark Stadion, Vaduz
Attendance: 1,692
Referee: Jakob Kehlet (Denmark)
26 March 2023
20:45

Luxembourg	0–6	Portugal
	Report	Ronaldo 9', 31'; Félix 15'; B. Silva 18'; Otávio 77'; Leão 88'

Stade de Luxembourg, Luxembourg City
Attendance: 9,231
Referee: Radu Petrescu (Romania)
26 March 2023
20:45

Slovakia	2–0	Bosnia and Herzegovina
Mak 13'; Haraslín 40'	Report

Tehelné pole, Bratislava
Attendance: 6,052
Referee: Marco Di Bello (Italy)

17 June 2023
15:00

Luxembourg	2–0	Liechtenstein
Sinani 59'; G. Rodrigues 89'	Report

Stade de Luxembourg, Luxembourg City
Attendance: 6,806
Referee: Oleksii Derevinskyi (Ukraine)
17 June 2023
20:45 (18:45 UTC±0)

Iceland	1–2	Slovakia
Finnbogason 41' (pen.)	Report	Kucka 27'; Suslov 69'

Laugardalsvöllur, Reykjavík
Attendance: 7,555
Referee: Donald Robertson (Scotland)
17 June 2023
20:45 (19:45 UTC+1)

Portugal	3–0	Bosnia and Herzegovina
B. Silva 44'; Fernandes 77', 90+3'	Report

Estádio da Luz, Lisbon
Attendance: 55,058
Referee: Davide Massa (Italy)

20 June 2023
20:45

Bosnia and Herzegovina	0–2	Luxembourg
	Report	Borges Sanches 4'; Sinani 74'

Stadion Bilino polje, Zenica
Attendance: 8,600
Referee: Gal Leibovitz (Israel)
20 June 2023
20:45 (18:45 UTC±0)

Iceland	0–1	Portugal
	Report	Ronaldo 89'

Laugardalsvöllur, Reykjavík
Attendance: 9,517
Referee: Daniel Siebert (Germany)
20 June 2023
20:45

Liechtenstein	0–1	Slovakia
	Report	Vavro 45+1'

Rheinpark Stadion, Vaduz
Attendance: 2,316
Referee: Yigal Frid (Israel)

8 September 2023
20:45

Bosnia and Herzegovina	2–1	Liechtenstein
Džeko 3'; Lüchinger 18' (o.g.)	Report	Wolfinger 21'

Stadion Bilino polje, Zenica
Attendance: 6,189
Referee: Sayat Karabayev (Kazakhstan)
8 September 2023
20:45

Luxembourg	3–1	Iceland
Chanot 9' (pen.); Borges Sanches 70'; Sinani 89'	Report	Haraldsson 88'

Stade de Luxembourg, Luxembourg City
Attendance: 7,427
Referee: Goga Kikacheishvili (Georgia)
8 September 2023
20:45

Slovakia	0–1	Portugal
	Report	Fernandes 43'

Tehelné pole, Bratislava
Attendance: 21,473
Referee: Glenn Nyberg (Sweden)

11 September 2023
20:45 (18:45 UTC±0)

Iceland	1–0	Bosnia and Herzegovina
Finnbogason 90+1'	Report

Laugardalsvöllur, Reykjavík
Attendance: 5,229
Referee: Lawrence Visser (Belgium)
11 September 2023
20:45 (19:45 UTC+1)

Portugal	9–0	Luxembourg
Inácio 12', 45+3'; Ramos 18', 34'; Jota 58', 78'; Horta 67'; Fernandes 83'; Félix 88'	Report

Estádio Algarve, Faro/Loulé
Attendance: 18,932
Referee: John Brooks (England)
11 September 2023
20:45

Slovakia	3–0	Liechtenstein
Hancko 1'; Duda 3'; Mak 6'	Report

Tehelné pole, Bratislava
Attendance: 13,679
Referee: Sander van der Eijk (Netherlands)

13 October 2023
20:45 (18:45 UTC±0)

Iceland	1–1	Luxembourg
Óskarsson 23'	Report	G. Rodrigues 46'

Laugardalsvöllur, Reykjavík
Attendance: 4,568
Referee: Sebastian Gishamer (Austria)
13 October 2023
20:45

Liechtenstein	0–2	Bosnia and Herzegovina
	Report	Rahmanović 13'; Stevanović 41'

Rheinpark Stadion, Vaduz
Attendance: 5,874
Referee: Damian Sylwestrzak (Poland)
13 October 2023
20:45 (19:45 UTC+1)

Portugal	3–2	Slovakia
Ramos 18'; Ronaldo 29' (pen.), 72'	Report	Hancko 69'; Lobotka 80'

Estádio do Dragão, Porto
Attendance: 46,601
Referee: Anastasios Sidiropoulos (Greece)

16 October 2023
20:45

Bosnia and Herzegovina	0–5	Portugal
	Report	Ronaldo 5' (pen.), 20'; Fernandes 25'; Cancelo 32'; Félix 41'

Stadion Bilino polje, Zenica
Attendance: 13,047
Referee: Halil Umut Meler (Turkey)
16 October 2023
20:45 (18:45 UTC±0)

Iceland	4–0	Liechtenstein
G. Sigurðsson 22' (pen.), 49'; Finnbogason 44'; Haraldsson 63'	Report

Laugardalsvöllur, Reykjavík
Attendance: 4,317
Referee: Abdulkadir Bitigen (Turkey)
16 October 2023
20:45

Luxembourg	0–1	Slovakia
	Report	Ďuriš 77'

Stade de Luxembourg, Luxembourg City
Attendance: 9,386
Referee: José María Sánchez Martínez (Spain)

16 November 2023
20:45

Liechtenstein	0–2	Portugal
	Report	Ronaldo 46'; Cancelo 57'

Rheinpark Stadion, Vaduz
Attendance: 5,749
Referee: Mohammed Al-Hakim (Sweden)
16 November 2023
20:45

Luxembourg	4–1	Bosnia and Herzegovina
Olesen 6'; G. Rodrigues 30' (pen.), 90+5'; Mujakić 55' (o.g.)	Report	Gojković 90+3'

Stade de Luxembourg, Luxembourg City
Attendance: 8,520
Referee: Andris Treimanis (Latvia)
16 November 2023
20:45

Slovakia	4–2	Iceland
Kucka 30'; Duda 36' (pen.); Haraslín 47', 55'	Report	Óskarsson 17'; Guðjohnsen 74'

Tehelné pole, Bratislava
Attendance: 21,548
Referee: Craig Pawson (England)

19 November 2023
20:45

Bosnia and Herzegovina	1–2	Slovakia
Hrošovský 49' (o.g.)	Report	Boženík 52'; Šatka 71'

Stadion Bilino polje, Zenica
Attendance: 3,800
Referee: Julian Weinberger (Austria)
19 November 2023
20:45

Liechtenstein	0–1	Luxembourg
	Report	G. Rodrigues 69'

Rheinpark Stadion, Vaduz
Attendance: 2,241
Referee: Stéphanie Frappart (France)
19 November 2023
20:45 (19:45 UTC±0)

Portugal	2–0	Iceland
Fernandes 37'; Horta 66'	Report

Estádio José Alvalade, Lisbon
Attendance: 45,655
Referee: Anastasios Papapetrou (Greece)

== Goalscorers ==
There were 93 goals scored in 30 matches, for an average of 3.1 goals per match.

10 goals

- (Portugal) Cristiano Ronaldo

6 goals

- (Portugal) Bruno Fernandes

5 goals

- (Luxembourg) Gerson Rodrigues

3 goals

- (Iceland) Hákon Arnar Haraldsson
- (Iceland) Alfreð Finnbogason
- (Iceland) Aron Gunnarsson
- (Luxembourg) Danel Sinani
- (Portugal) João Cancelo
- (Portugal) João Félix
- (Portugal) Gonçalo Ramos
- (Portugal) Bernardo Silva
- (Slovakia) Lukáš Haraslín

2 goals

- (Bosnia and Herzegovina) Rade Krunić
- (Iceland) Andri Guðjohnsen
- (Iceland) Orri Óskarsson
- (Iceland) Gylfi Sigurðsson
- (Luxembourg) Yvandro Borges Sanches
- (Portugal) Ricardo Horta
- (Portugal) Gonçalo Inácio
- (Portugal) Diogo Jota
- (Slovakia) Ondrej Duda
- (Slovakia) Dávid Hancko
- (Slovakia) Juraj Kucka
- (Slovakia) Róbert Mak

1 goal

- (Bosnia and Herzegovina) Amar Dedić
- (Bosnia and Herzegovina) Edin Džeko
- (Bosnia and Herzegovina) Renato Gojković
- (Bosnia and Herzegovina) Amar Rahmanović
- (Bosnia and Herzegovina) Miroslav Stevanović
- (Iceland) Mikael Egill Ellertsson
- (Iceland) Davíð Kristján Ólafsson
- (Liechtenstein) Sandro Wolfinger
- (Luxembourg) Maxime Chanot
- (Luxembourg) Mathias Olesen
- (Portugal) Rafael Leão
- (Portugal) Otávio
- (Slovakia) Róbert Boženík
- (Slovakia) Dávid Ďuriš
- (Slovakia) Stanislav Lobotka
- (Slovakia) Ľubomír Šatka
- (Slovakia) Tomáš Suslov
- (Slovakia) Denis Vavro

1 own goal

- (Bosnia and Herzegovina) Nihad Mujakić (against Luxembourg)
- (Liechtenstein) Simon Lüchinger (against Bosnia and Herzegovina)
- (Slovakia) Patrik Hrošovský (against Bosnia and Herzegovina)

== Discipline ==
A player was automatically suspended for the next match for the following offences:

- Receiving a red card (red card suspensions could be extended for serious offences)
- Receiving three yellow cards in three different matches, as well as after fifth and any subsequent yellow card (yellow card suspensions could be carried forward to the play-offs, but not the finals or any other future international matches)

The following suspensions were served during the qualifying matches:

Team	Player	Offence(s)	Suspended for match(es)
Iceland	Aron Gunnarsson	(red card) vs Albania in 2022–23 UEFA Nations League (27 September 2022)	vs Bosnia and Herzegovina (23 March 2023)
Iceland	Willum Þór Willumsson	(yellow card) (red card) vs Portugal on (20 June 2023)	vs Luxembourg (8 September 2023)
Iceland	Hördur Magnússon	(yellow card) (red card) vs Luxembourg (8 September 2023)	vs Bosnia and Herzegovina (11 September 2023)
Luxembourg	Christopher Martins	(yellow card) vs Portugal (26 March 2023); (yellow card) vs Bosnia and Herzegovina (20 June 2023); (yellow card) vs Iceland (8 September 2023)	vs Portugal (11 September 2023)
Luxembourg	Enes Mahmutović	(yellow card) vs Iceland (8 September 2023); (yellow card) vs Portugal (11 September 2023); (yellow card) vs Iceland (13 October 2023)	vs Slovakia (16 October 2023)
Luxembourg	Vincent Thill	(yellow card) vs Portugal (26 March 2023); (yellow card) vs Portugal (11 September 2023); (yellow card) vs Slovakia (16 October 2023)	vs Bosnia and Herzegovina (16 November 2023)
Luxembourg	Laurent Jans	(yellow card) vs Slovakia (23 March 2023); (yellow card) vs Liechtenstein (17 June 2023); (yellow card) vs Slovakia (16 October 2023)	vs Bosnia and Herzegovina (16 November 2023)
Portugal	Cristiano Ronaldo	(yellow card) vs Luxembourg (26 March 2023); (yellow card) vs Iceland (20 June 2023); (yellow card) vs Slovakia (8 September 2023)	vs Luxembourg (11 September 2023)
Slovakia	Peter Pekarík	(yellow card) vs Iceland (16 June 2023); (yellow card) vs Portugal (13 October 2023); (yellow card) vs Luxembourg (16 October 2023)	vs Iceland (16 November 2023)
Slovakia	Patrik Hrošovský	(yellow card) vs Liechtenstein (11 September 2023); (yellow card) vs Portugal (13 October 2023); (yellow card) vs Luxembourg (16 October 2023)	vs Iceland (16 November 2023)
