= Marco Wolfinger =

Liechtensteiner footballer (born 1989)

Personal information
- Full name: Marco Wolfinger
- Date of birth: 18 April 1989 (age 37)
- Place of birth: Vaduz, Liechtenstein
- Height: 1.74 m (5 ft 9 in)
- Position: Defender

Youth career
- Eschen/Mauren

Senior career*
Years	Team	Apps	(Gls)
2005–2008	Eschen/Mauren	15	(0)
2008–2009	Schaan		
2009–2010	Ruggell		
2010–2012	Grabs		
2012–2017	Ruggell		
2017–2024	Balzers	76	(5)

International career^{‡}
2010–2011	Liechtenstein U21	3	(0)
2022	Liechtenstein	3	(0)
- * Club domestic league appearances and goals as of 31 May 2025 ‡ National team caps and goals as of 26 September 2022

Marco Wolfinger (born 18 April 1989) is a retired Liechtensteiner footballer who currently is the sporting director for FC Balzers.

== International career ==
He was a member of the Liechtenstein national football team, making his debut in a 2022–23 UEFA Nations League match against Latvia on 6 June 2022. Wolfinger also made three appearances for the Liechtenstein U21.

== Personal life ==
Marco is the oldest of three Wolfinger brothers to have been capped by the Liechtenstein senior team along with Sandro and Fabio.
