= Fabio Wolfinger =

Liechtensteiner footballer (born 1996)

Personal information
- Full name: Fabio Wolfinger
- Date of birth: 11 May 1996 (age 30)
- Place of birth: Vaduz, Liechtenstein
- Height: 1.78 m (5 ft 10 in)
- Position: Left winger

Team information
- Current team: FC Balzers
- Number: 8

Youth career
- 2005–2014: Vaduz
- 2014: Balzers

Senior career*
Years	Team	Apps	(Gls)
2014–2017	Balzers	33	(1)
2017	Rheindorf Altach II	8	(0)
2017–2018	Langenthal	22	(0)
2018–2019	Ostermundigen	0	(0)
2019–2021	Eschen/Mauren	16	(1)
2021–	Balzers	111	(10)

International career^{‡}
2010–2012	Liechtenstein U17	9	(0)
2014	Liechtenstein U19	3	(0)
2014–2018	Liechtenstein U21	19	(0)
2017–	Liechtenstein	37	(1)
- * Club domestic league appearances and goals as of 15:30, 6 June 2026 (UTC) ‡ National team caps and goals as of 29 March 2026

Fabio Wolfinger (born 11 May 1996) is a Liechtensteiner footballer who plays for FC Balzers.

== International career ==
He is a member of the Liechtenstein national football team, making his debut in a friendly match against Qatar on 14 December 2017. Wolfinger also made 19 appearances for the Liechtenstein U21.

== Personal life ==
Fabio is the youngest of three Wolfinger brothers to have been capped by the Liechtenstein senior team after Marco and Sandro.

== International goals ==
#	Date	Venue	Opponent	Score	Result	Competition
1.	7 October 2020	Stade Josy Barthel, Luxembourg City, Luxembourg	Luxembourg	1–0	2–1	Friendly
