= Sandro Wolfinger =

Liechtensteiner footballer (born 1991)

Personal information
- Full name: Sandro Wolfinger
- Date of birth: 24 August 1991 (age 35)
- Place of birth: Vaduz, Liechtenstein
- Height: 1.77 m (5 ft 9 1/2 in)
- Position: Midfielder

Senior career*
Years	Team	Apps	(Gls)
2011–2012	FC Ruggell		
2012–2013	SV Untermenzing		
2013–2014	FC Chur 97	16	(2)
2014–2015	FC Balzers	11	(0)
2015–2016	SV Heimstetten	3	(0)
2016–2018	BCF Wolfratshausen	28	(3)
2018–2021	USV Eschen/Mauren	58	(1)
2021–2026	FC Balzers	74	(3)

International career^{‡}
2013–2026	Liechtenstein	79	(3)
- * Club domestic league appearances and goals as of 6 June 2026 ‡ National team caps and goals as of 7 June 2026

Sandro Wolfinger (born 24 August 1991) is a former Liechtensteiner footballer who last played for FC Balzers.

== International career ==
He was a member of the Liechtenstein national football team and held 79 caps and has scored three goals, making his debut in a friendly against Estonia on 19 November 2013.

On 8 September 2023, Wolfinger scored a world-class volley in the match against Bosnia and Herzegovina. His goal was voted as the top goal of the qualifying campaign by UEFA's technical observer panel.

At the pre-match press conference, Wolfinger announced his retirement from football after one final match on 7 June 2026 in a friendly against Cyprus.

=== International goals ===
Score and Result lists Liechtenstein's goal tally first

No.	Date	Venue	Opponent	Score	Result	Competition	Ref.
1.	28 March 2016	Centro Deportivo Municipal de Marbella, Marbella, Spain	Faroe Islands	2–3	2–3	Friendly	
2.	6 September 2018	Vazgen Sargsyan Republican Stadium, Yerevan, Armenia	Armenia	1–1	1–2	2018–19 UEFA Nations League	
3.	8 September 2023	Stadion Bilino Polje, Zenica, Bosnia and Herzegovina	Bosnia and Herzegovina	1–2	1–2	UEFA Euro 2024 qualifying	

== Personal life ==
Sandro is the middle of three Wolfinger brothers to have been capped by the Liechtenstein senior team after Marco and Fabio.
