= Mathias Olesen =

Luxembourgish footballer (born 2001)

Personal information
- Full name: Mathias Flaga Olesen
- Date of birth: 21 March 2001 (age 25)
- Place of birth: Copenhagen, Denmark
- Height: 1.88 m (6 ft 2 in)
- Position: Midfielder

Team information
- Current team: Sønderjyske
- Number: 10

Youth career
- 2017–2019: Eintracht Trier
- 2019–2020: 1. FC Köln

Senior career*
Years	Team	Apps	(Gls)
2018–2019	Eintracht Trier	1	(0)
2019–2023	1. FC Köln II	55	(4)
2022–2025	1. FC Köln	41	(0)
2024	→ Yverdon (loan)	17	(0)
2025–2026	Greuther Fürth	12	(0)
2026	→ Grazer AK (loan)	15	(1)
2026–	Sønderjyske	0	(0)

International career^{‡}
2017	Luxembourg U16	6	(0)
2017	Luxembourg U17	8	(1)
2018	Luxembourg U18	2	(1)
2018–2019	Luxembourg U19	8	(1)
2018–2021	Luxembourg U21	11	(1)
2021–	Luxembourg	45	(2)
- * Club domestic league appearances and goals as of 6 June 2026 ‡ National team caps and goals as of 16 November 2026

Mathias Flaga Olesen (born 21 March 2001) is a professional footballer who plays for Danish Superliga club Sønderjyske. Born in Denmark, he represents the Luxembourg national team.

== Club career ==
On 10 June 2025, Olesen signed a two-year contract with Greuther Fürth in 2. Bundesliga.

On 2 February 2026, Olesen moved on loan to Grazer AK in Austria, with an option to buy.

On 12 July 2026, Olesen signed a three-season contract with Sønderjyske in Denmark.

== International career ==
Olesen made his international debut for Luxembourg on 11 November 2021.

== Personal life ==
Born in Denmark, Olesen moved to Luxembourg in 2007 with his family, as his father got a job there in the investment industry. Olesen attended the European School of Luxembourg II (ESL2).

== Career statistics ==
Scores and results list Luxembourg's goal tally first, score column indicates score after each Olesen goal.

List of international goals scored by Mathias Olesen
No	Date	Venue	Opponent	Score	Result	Competition
1.	16 November 2023	Stade de Luxembourg, Luxembourg City, Luxembourg	Bosnia and Herzegovina	1–0	4–1	UEFA Euro 2024 qualifying
2.	26 March 2026	National Stadium, Ta' Qali, Malta	Malta	2–0	2–0	2024–25 UEFA Nations League promotion/relegation play-offs

== Honours ==
1.FC Koln

- 2.Bundesliga: 2024–25
