= Yvandro Borges Sanches =

Luxembourgish footballer (born 2004)

Personal information
- Date of birth: 24 May 2004 (age 22)
- Place of birth: Luxembourg City, Luxembourg
- Height: 1.75 m (5 ft 9 in)
- Position: Attacking midfielder

Team information
- Current team: Heracles Almelo
- Number: 21

Youth career
- 2016–2020: RCFU Luxembourg
- 2020–2023: Borussia Mönchengladbach

Senior career*
Years	Team	Apps	(Gls)
2021–2025	Borussia Mönchengladbach II	23	(2)
2022–2025	Borussia Mönchengladbach	6	(0)
2024	→ NEC Nijmegen (loan)	8	(0)
2025–	Heracles Almelo	11	(2)

International career^{‡}
2018	Luxembourg U15	2	(6)
2020	Luxembourg U16	1	(0)
2021	Luxembourg U21	1	(0)
2021–	Luxembourg	29	(3)
- * Club domestic league appearances and goals as of 5 June 2026 ‡ National team caps and goals as of 31 March 2026

Yvandro Borges Sanches (born 24 May 2004) is a Luxembourgish professional footballer who plays as an attacking midfielder for Dutch Eerste Divisie club Heracles Almelo and the Luxembourg national team.

== Club career ==
Born in Luxembourg to Cape Verdean parents, Borges Sanches arrived in Borussia Mönchengladbach on the summer 2020, from the Luxembourgish club of Racing-Union. Progressing through the youth ranks of Borussia Mönchengladbach, he also played his first senior game in the summer 2021, during a friendly against Bayern Munich.

In the early 2021–22 season, he was part of the under-19 team, regularly scoring for the Borussen youth.

In January 2024, Borges Sanches joined Eredivisie club NEC Nijmegen on loan until the end of the season.

On 7 August 2025, Borges Sanches returned to the Netherlands and signed a three-season contract with Heracles Almelo.

== International career ==
Already a youth international with Luxembourg, Yvandro Borges Sanches made his debut with the under-21 in June 2021.

Called to the national senior team by Luc Holtz for the first time in August 2021, he made his international debut for the Luxembourg national team on 4 September 2021, coming on as a late substitute in the European Championship qualifying 4–1 defeat against Serbia. On 7 September 2021, he made his debut in the starting lineup against Qatar. In that game he scored his first international goal in the 31st minute for Luxembourg.

== Career statistics ==
Scores and results list Luxembourg's goal tally first.

No.	Date	Venue	Opponent	Score	Result	Competition
1.	7 September 2021	Stade de Luxembourg, Luxembourg City, Luxembourg	Qatar	1–0	1–1	Friendly
2.	20 June 2023	Bilino Polje Stadium, Zenica, Bosnia & Herzegovina	Bosnia and Herzegovina	1–0	2–0	UEFA Euro 2024 qualifying
3.	8 September 2023	Stade de Luxembourg, Luxembourg City, Luxembourg	Iceland	2–0	3–1	UEFA Euro 2024 qualifying
