= Danel Sinani =

Luxembourgish footballer (born 1997)

Danel Sinani Данел Синани
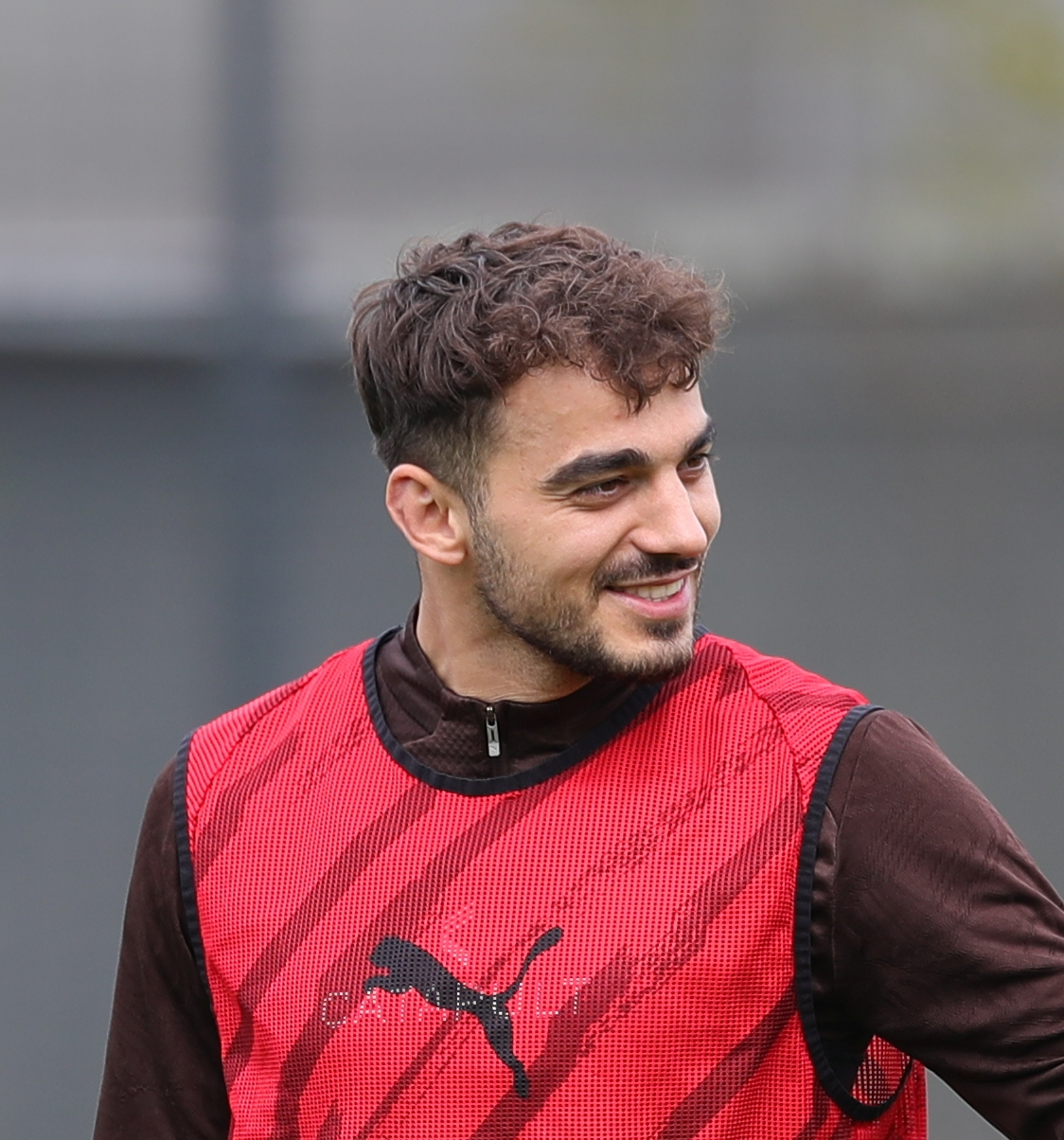
- Sinani in 2025

Personal information
- Full name: Danel Sinani
- Date of birth: 5 April 1997 (age 29)
- Place of birth: Belgrade, Serbia, FR Yugoslavia
- Height: 1.85 m (6 ft 1 in)
- Position: Winger

Team information
- Current team: Sampdoria
- Number: 20

Youth career
- 2006–2012: FC Differdange 03
- 2012–2014: Racing FC

Senior career*
Years	Team	Apps	(Gls)
2014–2017	Racing FC	62	(12)
2017–2020	Dudelange	64	(30)
2020–2023	Norwich City	16	(1)
2020–2021	→ Waasland-Beveren (loan)	18	(3)
2021–2022	→ Huddersfield Town (loan)	39	(6)
2023	→ Wigan Athletic (loan)	10	(0)
2023–2026	FC St. Pauli	63	(8)
2026–	Sampdoria	5	(0)

International career^{‡}
2015	Luxembourg U19	3	(0)
2015–2017	Luxembourg U21	11	(1)
2017–	Luxembourg	83	(16)
- * Club domestic league appearances and goals as of 22:38, 25 October 2026 (UTC) ‡ National team caps and goals as of 26 September 2026

Danel Sinani (Serbian Cyrillic: Данел Синани; born 5 April 1997) is a professional footballer who plays as a winger for Italian Serie B club Sampdoria. Born in Serbia, he represents the Luxembourg national team.

== Club career ==
=== In Luxembourg ===
Sinani played club football in Luxembourg for Racing FC Union Luxembourg before joining F91 Dudelange in 2017. With the latter, he won two Luxembourg National Division titles and the Luxembourg Cup. In November 2018, he scored the first ever goal for a Luxembourgish club in the group stage of a major European competition against Olympiacos. In 2019, Sinani was given the Luxembourg Footballer of the Year award. It was his first award of the trophy, known as the Wanderpokal Challenge Guy Greffrath (Challenge Guy Greffrath Challenge Cup). In the summer of 2019, Sinani was offered a move to R.E. Virton, who play in the Belgian league, but he refused the deal. Later in the year, he scored two goals in a Europa League match against five time Europa League winners Sevilla. As of 2020, he has scored 13 goals in UEFA Champions League and Europa League matches. Sinani has scored 14 goals in 16 appearances in the 2019–20 Luxembourg National Division, nine goals in the 2019–20 UEFA Europa League, and 24 goals in 30 matches in all competitions.

=== Norwich City ===
In April 2020, he signed for Norwich City for the 2020–21 season. His contract is until 2023, and he is the first Luxembourgish Norwich City player.

In August 2020, Sinani was loaned to Belgian club Waasland-Beveren for the season.

On 28 July 2021, he joined Huddersfield Town on a season-long loan. As part of the loan agreement with Norwich, Huddersfield have the option to sign him permanently at the end of the season. Sinani made his EFL Championship debut as a late substitute in the 1–1 draw against Derby County at Pride Park on 6 August 2021. He made his full home debut against Everton in the EFL Cup on 24 August 2021 when Huddersfield lost 2–1.

Upon his return to Norwich he scored his first goal for the club in an EFL Cup win over Birmingham City on 9 August 2022. He then scored his first league goal for the club in his next appearance, a 2–1 victory over former club Huddersfield Town at Carrow Road.

On 31 January 2023, the last day of the 2022–23 winter transfer window, Sinani joined Championship side Wigan Athletic on loan until the end of the season.

Sinani was released by Norwich City at the end of the 2022–23 season.

=== FC St. Pauli ===
On 4 July 2023, Sinani signed for Bundesliga club FC St. Pauli on a free transfer.

=== Sampdoria ===
On 10 July 2026, Sinani joined Sampdoria in Italian Serie B on a two-year contract.

== International career ==
Sinani made his international debut for Luxembourg in 2017. Kosovo approached Sinani about representing them internationally, as his parents are from Dragash. Sinani refused the meeting to discuss it, as he sees Luxembourg as his home. Sinani scored three goals for Luxembourg during their 2018–19 UEFA Nations League D campaign.

== Personal life ==
Sinani was born in Belgrade, Serbia, FR Yugoslavia to ethnic Gorani parents from Dragash. He moved to Luxembourg along with his family at the age of 5.

He is the younger brother of Dejvid Sinani.

== Career statistics ==
=== Club ===
As of match played 9 May 2026

Appearances and goals by club, season and competition
Club	Season	League			National Cup (Note: Includes FA Cup, Belgian Cup, DFB Pokal)		League Cup (Note: Includes EFL Cup)		Other		Total	
Club	Season	Division	Apps	Goals	Apps	Goals	Apps	Goals	Apps	Goals	Apps	Goals
Racing FC	2014–15	Luxembourg Division of Honour	15	3	0	0	—		—		15	3
Racing FC	2015–16	Luxembourg National Division	23	3	0	0	—		—		23	3
Racing FC	2016–17	Luxembourg National Division	24	6	0	0	—		—		24	6
Racing FC	Total		62	12	0	0	—		—		62	12
Dudelange	2017–18	Luxembourg National Division	22	9	0	0	—		2 (Note: Appearances in UEFA Champions League)	0	24	9
Dudelange	2018–19	Luxembourg National Division	25	7	0	0	—		14 (Note: Two appearances in UEFA Champions League and 12 and two goals in UEFA Europa League)	4	39	11
Dudelange	2019–20	Luxembourg National Division	17	14	0	0	—		13 (Note: Two appearances in UEFA Champions League and 11 and nine goals in UEFA Europa League)	9	30	23
Dudelange	Total		64	30	0	0	—		29	13	93	43
Norwich City	2020–21	Championship	0	0	0	0	0	0	—		0	0
Norwich City	2021–22	Premier League	0	0	0	0	0	0	—		0	0
Norwich City	2022–23	Championship	16	1	1	0	1	1	—		18	2
Norwich City	Total		16	1	1	0	1	1	—		18	2
Waasland-Beveren (loan)	2020–21	Belgian First Division A	18	3	1	0	—		2 (Note: Appearances in Belgian First Division A Promotion-Relegation play-off)	1	21	4
Huddersfield Town (loan)	2021–22	Championship	39	6	3	0	2	0	3 (Note: Appearances in EFL Championship Promotion play-offs)	1	47	7
Wigan Athletic (loan)	2022–23	Championship	10	0	—		—		—		10	0
FC St. Pauli	2023–24	2. Bundesliga	7	1	3	0	—		—		10	1
FC St. Pauli	2024–25	Bundesliga	26	2	1	0	—		—		27	2
FC St. Pauli	2025–26	Bundesliga	30	5	3	0	—		—		33	5
FC St. Pauli	Total		63	8	7	0	1	1	—		71	9
Career total			272	60	12	0	3	1	34	15	321	76

=== International ===
As of match played 26 September 2026

Appearances and goals by national team and year
National team	Year	Apps	Goals
Luxembourg	2017	3	0
Luxembourg	2018	9	3
Luxembourg	2019	9	0
Luxembourg	2020	8	3
Luxembourg	2021	12	0
Luxembourg	2022	10	3
Luxembourg	2023	10	3
Luxembourg	2024	8	1
Luxembourg	2025	9	1
Luxembourg	2026	5	2
Total		83	16

Scores and results list Luxembourg's goal tally first.

List of international goals scored by Danel Sinani
No.	Date	Venue	Opponent	Score	Result	Competition
1	8 September 2018	Stade Josy Barthel, Luxembourg City, Luxembourg	Moldova	3–0	4–0	2018–19 UEFA Nations League D
2	11 September 2018	San Marino Stadium, Serravalle, San Marino	San Marino	3–0	3–0	2018–19 UEFA Nations League D
3	15 October 2018	Stade Josy Barthel, Luxembourg City, Luxembourg	San Marino	2–0	3–0	2018–19 UEFA Nations League D
4	10 October 2020	Stade Josy Barthel, Luxembourg City, Luxembourg	Cyprus	1–0	2–0	2020–21 UEFA Nations League C
5	10 October 2020	Stade Josy Barthel, Luxembourg City, Luxembourg	Cyprus	2–0	2–0	2020–21 UEFA Nations League C
6	13 October 2020	Podgorica City Stadium, Podgorica, Montenegro	Montenegro	2–1	2–1	2020–21 UEFA Nations League C
7	4 June 2022	LFF Stadium, Vilnius, Lithuania	Lithuania	1–0	2–0	2022–23 UEFA Nations League C
8	4 June 2022	LFF Stadium, Vilnius, Lithuania	Lithuania	2–0	2–0	2022–23 UEFA Nations League C
9	22 September 2022	Başakşehir Fatih Terim Stadium, Istanbul, Turkey	Turkey	2–1	3–3	2022–23 UEFA Nations League C
10	17 June 2023	Stade de Luxembourg, Luxembourg City, Luxembourg	Liechtenstein	1–0	2–0	UEFA Euro 2024 qualifying
11	20 June 2023	Bilino Polje Stadium, Zenica, Bosnia and Herzegovina	Bosnia and Herzegovina	2–0	2–0	UEFA Euro 2024 qualifying
12	8 September 2023	Stade de Luxembourg, Luxembourg City, Luxembourg	Iceland	3–1	3–1	UEFA Euro 2024 qualifying
13	27 March 2024	Stade de Luxembourg, Luxembourg City, Luxembourg	Kazakhstan	2–1	2–1	Friendly
14	25 March 2025	Kybunpark, St. Gallen, Switzerland	Switzerland	1–3	1–3	Friendly
15	31 March 2026	Stade de Luxembourg, Luxembourg City, Luxembourg	Malta	2–0	3–0	2024–25 UEFA Nations League promotion/relegation play-offs
16	6 June 2026	Arena Kombëtare, Tirana, Albania	Albania	1–0	1–0	Friendly

== Honours ==
Dudelange

- Luxembourg National Division: 2017–18, 2018–19
- Luxembourg Cup: 2018–19

FC St. Pauli

- 2.Bundesliga: 2023–24

Individual

- Luxembourgish Footballer of the Year: 2018–19
