= Simon Lüchinger =

Liechtenstein footballer

Personal information
- Full name: Simon Josef Lüchinger
- Date of birth: 28 November 2002 (age 23)
- Place of birth: Ruggell, Liechtenstein
- Height: 1.78 m (5 ft 10 in)
- Position: Midfielder

Team information
- Current team: Kerry (on loan from Schwarz-Weiß Bregenz)
- Number: 8

Youth career
- –2017: Ruggell
- 2017–2018: Vaduz

College career
| Years | Team | Apps | (Gls) |
| 2021 | Saint Francis Red Flash | 11 | (1) |

Senior career*
| Years | Team | Apps | (Gls) |
| 2018–2021 | Vaduz II | | |
| 2021–2025 | Vaduz | 18 | (0) |
| 2022 | → Eschen/Mauren (loan) | 5 | (0) |
| 2025– | Schwarz-Weiß Bregenz | 6 | (0) |
| 2026– | → Kerry (loan) | 3 | (0) |

International career^{‡}
| 2017–2018 | Liechtenstein U17 | 9 | (0) |
| 2017–2018 | Liechtenstein U19 | 7 | (0) |
| 2019–2022 | Liechtenstein U21 | 14 | (0) |
| 2021– | Liechtenstein | 36 | (0) |
- * Club domestic league appearances and goals as of 14:25, 24 September 2026 ‡ National team caps and goals as of 16:33, 18 November 2025

Simon Lüchinger (born 28 November 2002) is a Liechtensteiner footballer who plays as a midfielder for League of Ireland First Division club Kerry on loan from Austrian 2. Liga club Schwarz-Weiß Bregenz and the Liechtenstein national team.

== Club career ==
Lüchinger signed his first professional contract with Vaduz on 16 December 2021.

On 11 June 2022, Lüchinger was loaned to Eschen/Mauren. The loan was terminated early on 6 September 2022.

On 31 January 2025, his contract with Vaduz was mutually terminated.

On 30 April 2025, it was announced that Lüchinger would join Schwarz-Weiß Bregenz at the beginning of the 2025/26 season, signing a 2-year contract. He made his league debut for the club on 2 August 2025, in a 1–1 draw against SK Rapid II.

On 31 July 2026, Lüchinger joined League of Ireland First Division club Kerry on loan for the second half of the 2026 season.

== International career ==
Lüchinger has served as the captain of Liechtenstein's under-21 national team. He was first named the captain of the team at the age of 17 by then-head coach Martin Stocklasa, becoming the youngest player to captain the under-21 team in Liechtenstein's history. He made his under-21 debut on 6 June 2019 in a 1–0 win over Azerbaijan.

Lüchinger made his international senior debut for Liechtenstein on 7 June 2021 in a friendly match against Faroe Islands.

== Career statistics ==
=== International ===
As of 18 November 2025

Liechtenstein
| Year | Apps | Goals |
|---|---|---|
| 2021 | 1 | 0 |
| 2022 | 7 | 0 |
| 2023 | 9 | 0 |
| 2024 | 9 | 0 |
| 2025 | 10 | 0 |
| Total | 36 | 0 |
