= Gerson Rodrigues (footballer, born 1995) =

Luxembourger footballer

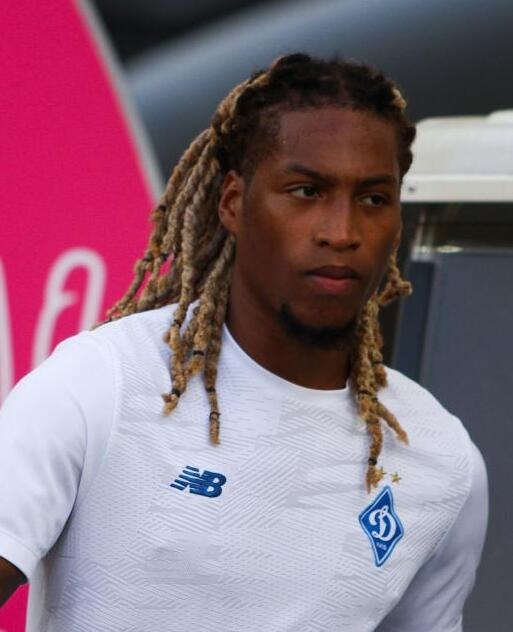
- Rodrigues in 2021 with Dynamo Kyiv

Personal information
- Full name: Gerson Rodrigues Correia Leal
- Date of birth: 20 June 1995 (age 31)
- Place of birth: Pragal, Almada, Portugal
- Height: 1.88 m (6 ft 2 in)
- Position: Forward

Team information
- Current team: Zorya Luhansk
- Number: 7

Youth career
- Metz

Senior career*
Years	Team	Apps	(Gls)
2013–2014	Swift Hesperange	10	(0)
2014–2016	Union Luxembourg	23	(3)
2016–2017	Fola Esch	20	(9)
2017	Telstar	12	(3)
2018	Sheriff Tiraspol	22	(8)
2019	Júbilo Iwata	15	(5)
2019–2025	Dynamo Kyiv	33	(6)
2020	→ Ankaragücü (loan)	11	(6)
2021–2022	→ Troyes (loan)	12	(1)
2022	→ Eyüpspor (loan)	5	(3)
2022–2023	→ Al-Wehda (loan)	15	(2)
2023–2024	→ Sivasspor (loan)	13	(2)
2024	→ Slovan Bratislava (loan)	4	(4)
2024	→ Guangxi Pingguo Haliao (loan)	6	(1)
2025	→ AVS (loan)	5	(1)
2025–2026	Kanchanaburi Power	15	(3)
2026	Vardar	0	(0)
2026–	Zorya Luhansk	1	(0)

International career
2017–2025	Luxembourg	72	(23)
- * Club domestic league appearances and goals as of 10:15, 3 June 2026 (UTC)

Gerson Rodrigues Correia Leal (born 20 June 1995) is a professional footballer who plays as a forward for Ukrainian club Zorya Luhansk. Born in Portugal, he played for the Luxembourg national team.

A goalscoring midfielder, Rodrigues is the first Luxembourgish footballer to play in the group stage of the UEFA Champions League. He is the all-time leading goalscorer for the Luxembourg national team.

Rodrigues was convicted of three counts of assault and battery on 26 March 2025, one of which involved domestic violence against his former partner. He received an 18-month suspended prison sentence, a fine of €1,500, and had to pay €2,430 in damages to his ex-partner. He played two matches for the national team in June 2025, a move which outraged female politicians and female rights groups, before the FLF announced his suspension from the national team in August 2025.

== Club career ==
=== Early career ===
Rodrigues was born in the Portuguese town of Pragal, near Lisbon. He began his youth career in France with FC Metz. He was unable to make a breakthrough into the first-team squad at Metz and went on to play club football in Luxembourg for FC Swift Hesperange, Racing FC Union Luxembourg, and CS Fola Esch. From there, he moved to SC Telstar in the Netherlands.

On 30 January 2018, Rodrigues signed for Sheriff Tiraspol. On 10 July 2018, he made his debut in the UEFA Champions League qualifying round against Torpedo Kutaisi. After winning the league title with Sheriff in Moldova, Rodrigues signed for Júbilo Iwata on 16 January 2019. He quickly became a key player for Júbilo, scoring 7 goals in 18 matches for the club.

=== Dynamo Kyiv ===
==== 2019–20 season ====
On 2 August 2019, Rodrigues signed a contract with FC Dynamo Kyiv. On 31 January 2020, Rodrigues moved on loan to Ankaragücü in the Turkish Süper Lig for the remainder of the season. Rodrigues and teammate Ante Kulušić were involved in a training ground dust-up in July 2020. He was removed from the squad for the following match against Galatasaray and his loan was subsequently ended. In his time with Ankaragücü, Rodrigues scored six goals and notched one assist in 11 league matches as the club finished in last place but were saved from relegation as the league was expanded to 21 clubs for the 2020–21 Süper Lig season because of complications from the COVID-19 pandemic in Turkey.

==== 2020–21 season: Double winners ====
In the Ukrainian Super Cup on 25 August 2020, Rodrigues scored the winning goal in an eventual 3–1 triumph over rivals Shakhtar Donetsk. On 15 September, Rodrigues opened the scoring against Dutch side AZ Alkmaar in the third qualifying round of the UEFA Champions League as his side won 2–0. Rodrigues scored from the penalty spot in the play-off round against Belgian side Gent, capping a 5–1 win on aggregate and securing a place in the group stage. Rodrigues featured in the club's first group stage match against Italian giants Juventus on 20 October, and in doing so became the first Luxembourgish player to play in the group stage of the Champions League.

Rodrigues was an important member of the Dynamo Kyiv squad that won the domestic double of the Ukrainian Premier League and Ukrainian Cup during the 2020–21 season.

==== 2021–22 season: Loans to Troyes and Eyüpspor ====
On 31 August 2021, Rodrigues joined newly promoted Ligue 1 side Troyes on a season-long loan. The club held an option to make the deal permanent at the end of the season.

On 7 March 2022, FIFA announced that, due to the Russian invasion of Ukraine, all the contracts of foreign players in Ukraine are suspended until 30 June 2022 and they are allowed to sign with clubs outside Ukraine until that date. On 30 March 2022, Rodrigues signed with Turkish club Eyüpspor until 30 June 2022 using the new rule. He played on loan in the 2022–23 season for Al Wehda.

=== Kanchanaburi Power ===
After series of loan moves, Rodrigues left Dynamo Kyiv after six years and signed a permanent deal with Thai League 1 club Kanchanaburi Power on 1 August 2025. On 24 August, he scored his first goal for the club in a 3–3 draw to Bangkok United.

In April 2026, Kanchanaburi Power terminated his contract, citing unspecified "circumstances and facts".

=== Zorya Luhansk ===
On 17 September 2026, Rodrigues returned to Ukraine, signing for Zorya Luhansk. Two days later he made his debut for Zorya, in a 0–2 defeat against his former club Dynamo Kyiv.

== International career ==
Rodrigues made his international debut for Luxembourg in 2017. On 21 March 2019, he scored his first goal for the national team and Luxembourg's second of the match, as they came back from a goal behind against Lithuania to win 2–1 in UEFA Euro 2020 qualification. On 27 March 2021, Rodrigues scored the only goal in a famous 1–0 victory away to Ireland in 2022 FIFA World Cup qualification. Three days later, Rodrigues followed this up by scoring the opening goal for Luxembourg against his country of birth, European champions Portugal, to take a shock lead, but they eventually fell to a 1–3 defeat.

== Personal life ==
Rodrigues became a Luxembourgish citizen in March 2017 after officially requesting it to the authorities. He thus became immediately eligible for the national team of Luxembourg. He still retains his Portuguese citizenship as of today.

After his conviction for assault and battery, one of which involved domestic violence against his former partner, Rodrigues continued to play for the Luxembourg international football team. This caused outcry among leaders and groups including MP Corinne Cahen and the Conseil National de Femmes du Luxembourg. A journalist for Le Quotidien was excluded from a Luxembourg Football press event due to his negative coverage of Rodrigues's selection for the national team.

== Career statistics ==
=== Club ===
As of match played 18 March 2024

Appearances and goals by club, season and competition
Club	Season	League			National cup (Note: Includes Luxembourg Cup, KNVB Cup, Moldovan Cup, Emperor's Cup, Ukrainian Cup, King Cup, Slovak Cup)		Continental		Other		Total	
Club	Season	Division	Apps	Goals	Apps	Goals	Apps	Goals	Apps	Goals	Apps	Goals
Swift Hesperange	2012–13	Division of Honour	2	1	—		—		—		2	1
Swift Hesperange	2013–14	Luxembourg National Division	10	0	1	0	—		—		11	0
Swift Hesperange	Total		12	1	1	0	—		—		13	1
Union 05 Kayl-Tétange	2014–15	Division of Honour	22	4	—		—		—		22	4
Racing FC	2015–16	Luxembourg National Division	23	3	3	0	—		—		26	3
Fola Esch	2016–17	Luxembourg National Division	20	9	5	4	2 (Note: Appearances in UEFA Europa League)	0	—		27	13
Telstar	2017–18	Eerste Divisie	12	3	1	0	—		—		13	3
Sheriff Tiraspol	2018	Moldovan National Division	22	8	2	0	7 (Note: Four appearances in UEFA Champions League, three appearances in UEFA Europa League)	0	—		31	8
Jubilo Iwata	2019	J1 League	15	5	3	2	—		—		18	7
Dynamo Kyiv	2019–20	Ukrainian Premier League	8	2	0	0	4 (Note: Two appearances in UEFA Champions League, two appearances in UEFA Europa League)	0	0	0	12	2
Dynamo Kyiv	2020–21	Ukrainian Premier League	22	4	3	0	12 (Note: Eight appearances and two goals in UEFA Champions League, four appearances in UEFA Europa League)	2	1 (Note: Appearance in Ukrainian Super Cup)	1	38	7
Dynamo Kyiv	2021–22	Ukrainian Premier League	3	0	—		—		—		3	0
Dynamo Kyiv	Total		33	6	3	0	16	2	1	1	53	9
Ankaragücü (loan)	2019–20	Süper Lig	11	6	0	0	—		—		11	6
Troyes (loan)	2021–22	Ligue 1	12	1	0	0	—		—		12	1
Eyüpspor (loan)	2021–22	TFF First League	5	3	0	0	—		—		5	3
Al Wehda (loan)	2022–23	Saudi Pro League	15	2	1	0	—		—		16	2
Sivasspor (loan)	2023–24	Süper Lig	13	2	0	0	—		—		13	2
Slovan Bratislava (loan)	2023–24	Slovak First League	4	4	2	0	—		—		6	4
Career total			219	57	19	6	25	2	1	1	266	66

=== International ===
Appearances and goals by national team and year
National team	Year	Apps	Goals
Luxembourg	2017	9	0
Luxembourg	2018	5	0
Luxembourg	2019	10	3
Luxembourg	2020	7	2
Luxembourg	2021	10	5
Luxembourg	2022	10	5
Luxembourg	2023	8	5
Luxembourg	2024	9	3
Luxembourg	2025	4	0
Total		72	23

Scores and results list Luxembourg's goal tally first.

List of international goals scored by Gerson Rodrigues
No.	Date	Venue	Opponent	Score	Result	Competition
1.	22 March 2019	Stade Josy Barthel, Luxembourg City, Luxembourg	Lithuania	2–1	2–1	UEFA Euro 2020 qualification
2.	7 June 2019	LFF Stadium, Vilnius, Lithuania	Lithuania	1–0	1–1	UEFA Euro 2020 qualification
3.	14 November 2019	Red Star Stadium, Belgrade, Serbia	Serbia	1–2	2–3	UEFA Euro 2020 qualification
4.	5 September 2020	Baku Olympic Stadium, Baku, Azerbaijan	Azerbaijan	2–1	2–1	2020–21 UEFA Nations League C
5.	7 October 2020	Stade Josy Barthel, Luxembourg City, Luxembourg	Liechtenstein	1–2	1–2	Friendly
6.	27 March 2021	Aviva Stadium, Dublin, Republic of Ireland	Republic of Ireland	1–0	1–0	2022 FIFA World Cup qualification
7.	30 March 2021	Stade Josy Barthel, Luxembourg City, Luxembourg	Portugal	1–0	1–3	2022 FIFA World Cup qualification
8.	1 September 2021	Stade de Luxembourg, Luxembourg City, Luxembourg	Azerbaijan	2–0	2–1	2022 FIFA World Cup qualification
9.	11 November 2021	Baku Olympic Stadium, Baku, Azerbaijan	Azerbaijan	1–0	3–1	2022 FIFA World Cup qualification
10.	11 November 2021	Baku Olympic Stadium, Baku, Azerbaijan	Azerbaijan	3–1	3–1	2022 FIFA World Cup qualification
11.	7 June 2022	Tórsvøllur, Tórshavn, Faroe Islands	Faroe Islands	1–0	1–0	2022–23 UEFA Nations League C
12.	14 June 2022	Stade de Luxembourg, Luxembourg City, Luxembourg	Faroe Islands	1–0	2–2	2022–23 UEFA Nations League C
13.	22 September 2022	Başakşehir Fatih Terim Stadium, Istanbul, Turkey	Turkey	3–2	3–3	2022–23 UEFA Nations League C
14.	25 September 2022	Stade Josy Barthel, Luxembourg City, Luxembourg	Lithuania	1–0	1–0	2022–23 UEFA Nations League C
15.	17 November 2022	Stade de Luxembourg, Luxembourg City, Luxembourg	Hungary	1–0	2–2	Friendly
16.	17 June 2023	Stade de Luxembourg, Luxembourg City, Luxembourg	Liechtenstein	2–0	2–0	UEFA Euro 2024 qualification
17.	13 October 2023	Laugardalsvöllur, Reykjavík, Iceland	Iceland	1–1	1–1	UEFA Euro 2024 qualification
18.	16 November 2023	Stade de Luxembourg, Luxembourg City, Luxembourg	Bosnia and Herzegovina	2–0	4–1	UEFA Euro 2024 qualification
19.	16 November 2023	Stade de Luxembourg, Luxembourg City, Luxembourg	Bosnia and Herzegovina	4–1	4–1	UEFA Euro 2024 qualification
20.	19 November 2023	Rheinpark Stadion, Vaduz, Liechtenstein	Liechtenstein	1–0	1–0	UEFA Euro 2024 qualification
21.	26 March 2024	Stade de Luxembourg, Luxembourg City, Luxembourg	Kazakhstan	1–0	2–1	Friendly
22.	15 October 2024	ZTE Arena, Zalaegerszeg, Hungary	Belarus	1–1	1–1	2024–25 UEFA Nations League C
23.	18 November 2024	Stade de Luxembourg, Luxembourg City, Luxembourg	Northern Ireland	2–2	2–2	2024–25 UEFA Nations League C

== Honours ==
Sheriff Tiraspol

- Divizia Nationala: 2018

Dynamo Kyiv

- Ukrainian Premier League: 2020–21
- Ukrainian Cup: 2020–21
- Ukrainian Super Cup: 2019, 2020

Slovan Bratislava

- Slovak First Football League: 2023–24
