= Lawrence Visser =

Belgian football referee (born 1989)

- Born: December 18, 1989 (age 36); Lommel, Belgium

Domestic
Years	League	Role
2013–2024	Challenger Pro League	Referee
2014–	Belgian Pro League	Referee

International
Years	League	Role
2017–	FIFA listed	Referee
2017–	UEFA	Referee

Lawrence Visser (born 18 December 1989) is a Belgian football referee.

On 16 August 2014, Visser officiated his first-ever match in the Belgian Pro League, a fixture between the teams of KV Oostende and KV Mechelen. On 14 August 2020, the international referee was promoted to the second-highest referee category in the Union of European Football Associations (UEFA), becoming the first Belgian to reach this level since Sébastien Delferière.

On 28 September 2021, he made his debut in the UEFA Champions League, where he was assigned to officiate the group stage match between Real Madrid and Sheriff Tiraspol.
