= Stade de Luxembourg =

National football and rugby stadium of Luxembourg

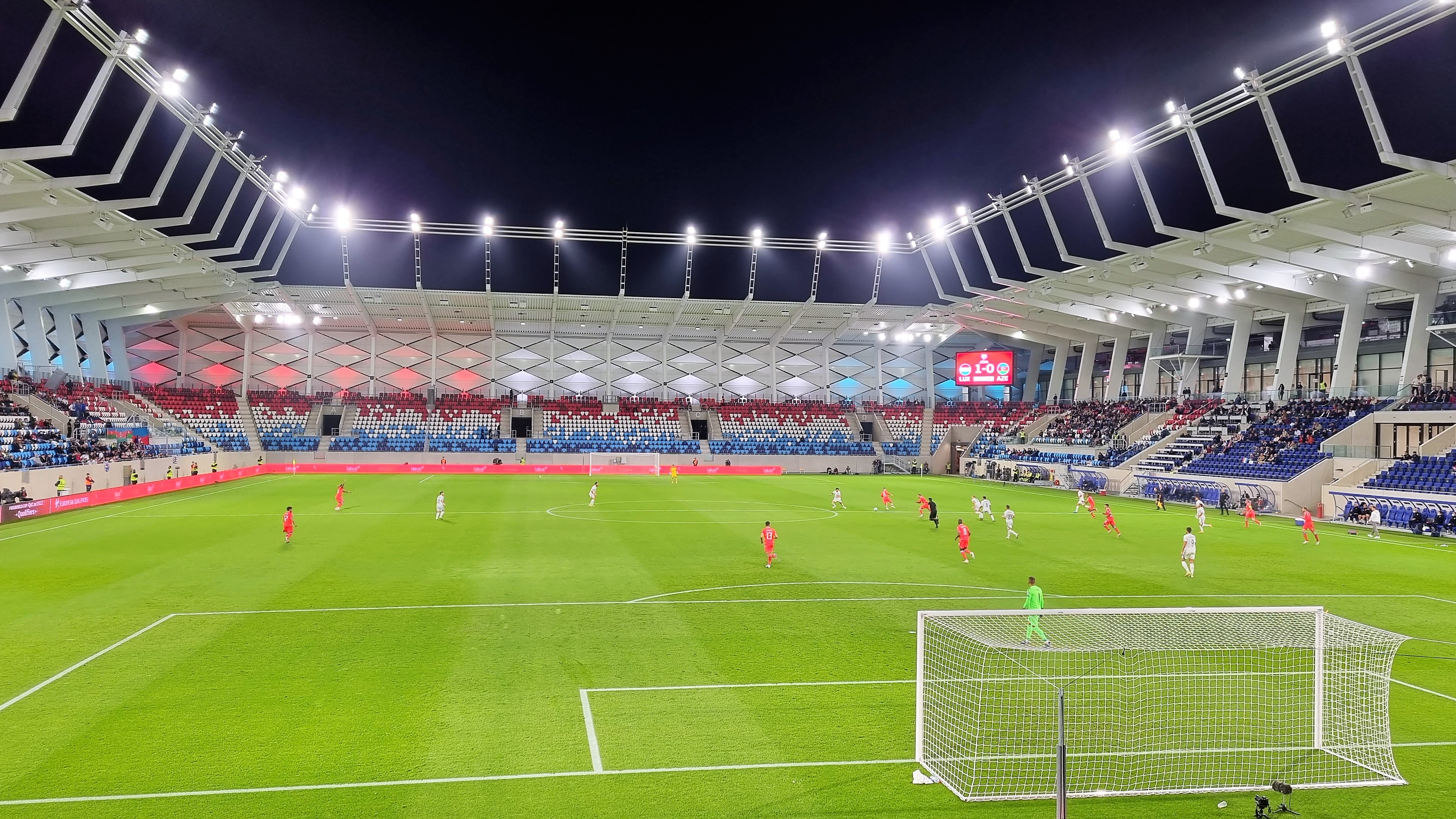
- UEFA
- Interactive map of Stade de Luxembourg
- Location: Gasperich, Luxembourg City, Luxembourg
- Coordinates: 49°34′38″N 6°06′53″E
- Capacity: 9,386 (sporting events); 15,000 (concerts)
- Surface: Hybrid grass
- Public transit: Stadion tram stop, Luxtram

Construction
- Groundbreaking: 18 September 2017
- Built: 2017–2021
- Opened: 16 July 2021
- Cost: ~ €80,000,000
- Architects: Beng Architectes Associés, Gerkan, Marg and Partners

Tenants
- Luxembourg national football team Luxembourg national rugby union team

Website
- stadedeluxembourg.lu

The Stade de Luxembourg (Stadium of Luxembourg) is the national stadium of the Grand Duchy of Luxembourg, located in the Luxembourg City district of Gasperich. The stadium is host to Luxembourg's national football and rugby teams, as well as the final of the Coupe de Luxembourg, and is listed as a Category 4 stadium by UEFA allowing it to host international matches. Construction on the stadium occurred between September 2017 and July 2021, missing the original 2019 target date for completion. On 1 September 2021, the stadium marked its official opening by hosting its first international match between the Luxembourg and Azerbaijan men's football teams as part of the 2022 FIFA World Cup qualifiers. The inauguration ceremony for the stadium took place later that month, on 25 September. The Stade de Luxembourg replaces the outdated Josy Barthel stadium, due for demolition.

== Design and construction ==
Exterior view of Stade de Luxembourg

The stadium's design was drawn up by local architectural firm Beng Architectes Associés in conjunction with the Hamburg-based Gerkan, Marg and Partners, and selected from a total of 25 submissions by Luxembourg's Minister of Sport and the Mayor of Luxembourg City in September 2014. The final design and construction plans were approved by a unanimous vote of Luxembourg City councillors on 5 December 2016.

Initial ground works on the stadium began in March 2017, with construction work commencing on 21 August 2017, and an official ground breaking ceremony in the presence of Mayor Lydie Polfer held on 18 September 2017. Works were due to be completed by October 2019, with an estimated cost, at the beginning of construction, of €61.1 million, with €40 million to be covered by the Ministry of Sport, and the rest by the Luxembourg City municipality. However, due to construction delays, the stadium's completion was initially put back until 2020, before finally being completed in July 2021. Construction costs were revised up to approximately 80 million euros, with the Luxembourg City administration paying for the overrun.

== Specifications ==
Due to its location alongside the A6 motorway, the stadium is situated along an east–west axis, in place of the more traditional north–south axis used for stadia. The stadium is designed to hold a capacity of 9,386 spectators with fully covered seating for sporting events, and can hold up to 15,000 spectators for concerts. The main grandstand is situated along the south side of the field. To cope with its dual purpose as a football and rugby venue, as well as hosting occasional concerts, the stadium is equipped with a hybrid grass playing surface.

== Name ==
The name of the stadium was revealed as the "Stade de Luxembourg" at a press conference in July 2020. In September 2020, the Luxembourg Chamber of Deputies rejected a petition to amend the name using the Luxembourgish language after it failed to gather the minimum amount of required signatures.

== Public transit ==
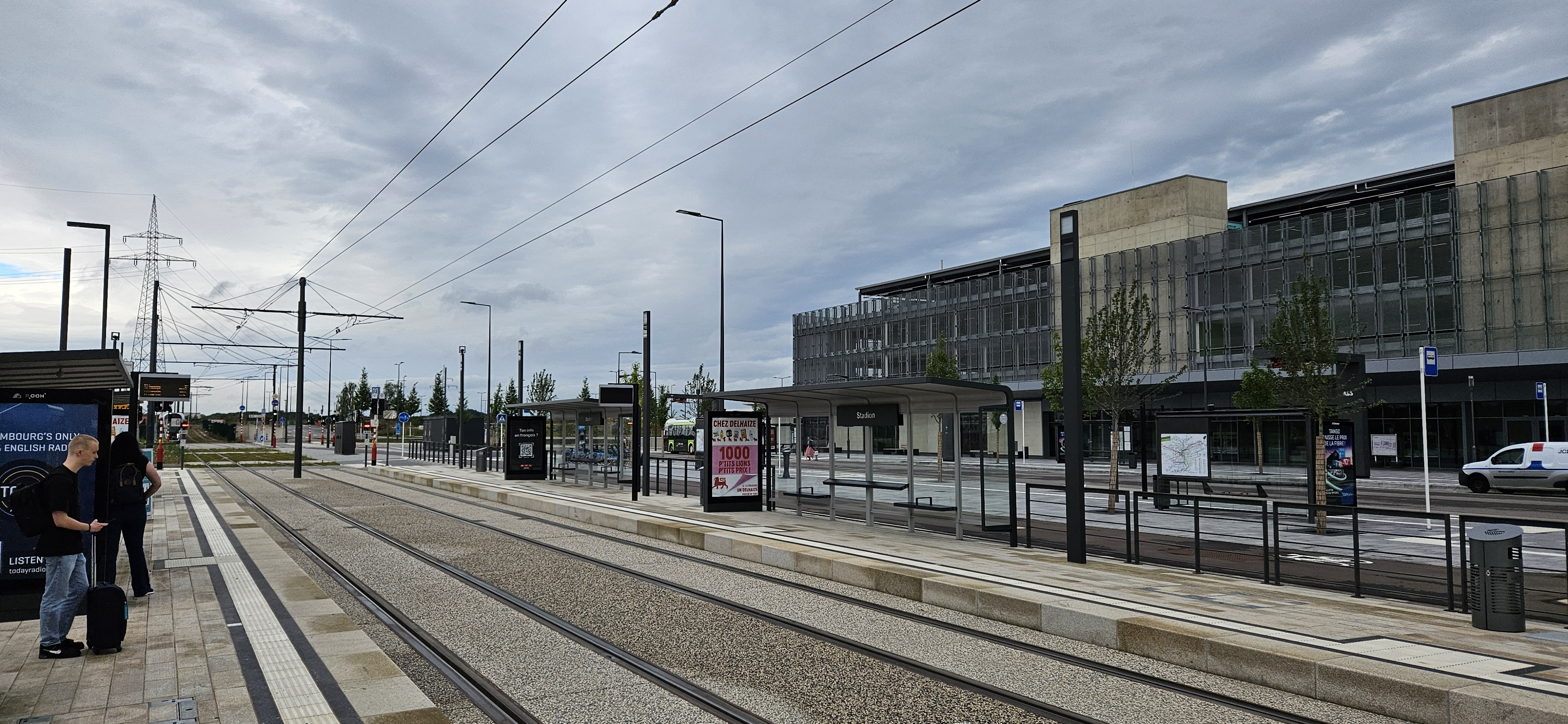
View of the stadium's tram stop and car park

Since the completion of segment D of line T1 of the Luxembourg City tramway, the stadium is served by the "Stadion" tram terminus, opened on 7 July 2024, linking it to the central Gare and Ville Haute districts.

A six-story, 1,993-space park and ride car park, built between 2020 and 2023 at a cost of nearly €80,000,000 and inaugurated on 5 October 2023, is located next to the stadium's Route d'Esch entrance.

== See also ==
- Luxembourg national football team
- Luxembourg national rugby union team
- Sport in Luxembourg
