= Andorra national football team results (2020–present) =

Andorra national football team results (2020-present)

This article provides details of international football games played by the Andorra national football team from 2020 to present.

== Results ==
Key
Win
Draw
Defeat

=== 2020 ===
26 March Friendly	Moldova	Cancelled	Andorra

3 September 2020–21 UEFA Nations League	Latvia	0–0	Andorra	Riga, Latvia
19:00		Report		Stadium: Daugava Stadium; Attendance: 0 (Note: Due to the COVID-19 pandemic in Europe, all matches scheduled for September 2020 were played behind closed doors.); Referee: Timotheos Christofi (Cyprus)

6 September 2020–21 UEFA Nations League	Andorra	0–1	Faroe Islands	Andorra la Vella, Andorra
15:00		Report	K. Olsen 31'	Stadium: Estadi Nacional; Attendance: 0 Referee: Harald Lechner (Austria)

7 October Friendly	Andorra	1–2	Cape Verde	Andorra la Vella, Andorra
20:45	Ponck 17' (o.g.)	Report	Mendes 8', 54'	Stadium: Estadi Nacional; Attendance: 0 Referee: José Luis Munuera Montero (Spain)

10 October 2020–21 UEFA Nations League	Andorra	0–0	Malta	Andorra la Vella, Andorra
20:45		Report		Stadium: Estadi Nacional; Attendance: 0 (Note: Due to the COVID-19 pandemic in Europe, the match was played behind closed doors.); Referee: Alain Durieux (Luxembourg)

13 October 2020–21 UEFA Nations League	Faroe Islands	2–0	Andorra	Tórshavn, Faroe Islands
19:45	K. Olsen 9', 33'	Report		Stadium: Tórsvøllur; Attendance: 0 Referee: Antti Munukka (Finland)

11 November Friendly	Portugal	7–0	Andorra	Lisbon, Portugal
19:45	Neto 8'; Paulinho 29', 61'; Sanches 56'; García 76' (o.g.); Ronaldo 85'; Félix 88'	Report		Stadium: Estádio da Luz; Attendance: 0 Referee: Alain Bieri (Switzerland)

14 November 2020–21 UEFA Nations League	Malta	3–1	Andorra	Ta' Qali, Malta
15:00	E. García 56' (o.g.); Degabriele 59'; Dimech 90+3'	Report	Rebés 3'	Stadium: National Stadium; Attendance: 0 Referee: Peter Kralović (Slovakia)

17 November 2020–21 UEFA Nations League	Andorra	0–5	Latvia	Andorra la Vella, Andorra
20:45		Report	Černomordijs 6'; J. Ikaunieks 57', 60'; Gutkovskis 70' (pen.); Krollis 90' (pen.)	Stadium: Estadi Nacional; Attendance: 0 Referee: Dimitar Meckarovski (North Macedonia)

=== 2021 ===
25 March 2022 FIFA World Cup qualification	Andorra	0–1	Albania	Andorra la Vella, Andorra
20:45		Report (FIFA); Report (UEFA)	Lenjani 41'	Stadium: Estadi Nacional; Attendance: 285; Referee: Volen Chinkov (Bulgaria)

28 March 2022 FIFA World Cup qualification	Poland	3–0	Andorra	Warsaw, Poland
20:45	Lewandowski 30', 55'; Świderski 88'	Report		Stadium: Stadion Wojska Polskiego; Attendance: 0 Referee: Erik Lambrechts (Belgium)

31 March 2022 FIFA World Cup qualification	Andorra	1–4	Hungary	Andorra la Vella, Andorra
20:45	Pujol 90+2' (pen.)	Report	Fiola 45+2'; Gazdag 51'; Kleinheisler 58'; Négo 90'	Stadium: Estadi Nacional; Attendance: 338; Referee: Vilhjalmur Thorarinsson (Iceland)

3 June Friendly	Andorra	1–4	Republic of Ireland	Andorra la Vella, Andorra
19:00	Vales 52'	Report	Parrott 58', 61'; Knight 84'; Horgan 89'	Stadium: Estadi Nacional; Attendance: 0 Referee: Xavier Estrada Fernández (Spain)

7 June Friendly	Andorra	0–0	Gibraltar	Andorra la Vella, Andorra
20:45		Report		Stadium: Estadi Nacional; Attendance: 0 Referee: Philip Farrugia (Malta)

2 September 2022 FIFA World Cup qualification	Andorra	2–0	San Marino	Andorra la Vella, Andorra
20:45	Vales 18', 24'	Report		Stadium: Estadi Nacional; Attendance: 1,400; Referee: Jakob Kehlet (Denmark)

5 September 2022 FIFA World Cup qualification	England	4–0	Andorra	London, England
17:00	Lingard 18', 78'; Kane 72' (pen.); Saka 85'	Report		Stadium: Wembley Stadium; Attendance: 67,171; Referee: Anastasios Papapetrou (Greece)

8 September 2022 FIFA World Cup qualification	Hungary	2–1	Andorra	Budapest, Hungary
20:45	Ád. Szalai 9' (pen.); Botka 18'	Report	Llovera 82'	Stadium: Puskás Aréna; Attendance: 46,240; Referee: Rade Obrenovič (Slovenia)

9 October 2022 FIFA World Cup qualification	Andorra	0–5	England	Andorra la Vella, Andorra
20:45		Report	Chilwell 17'; Saka 40'; Abraham 59'; Ward-Prowse 79'; Grealish 86'	Stadium: Estadi Nacional; Attendance: 2,285; Referee: Kateryna Monzul (Ukraine)

12 October 2022 FIFA World Cup qualification	San Marino	0–3	Andorra	Serravalle, San Marino
20:45		Report	Pujol 10'; Moreno 53'; Fernández 89'	Stadium: San Marino Stadium; Attendance: 243; Referee: Halil Umut Meler (Turkey)

12 November 2022 FIFA World Cup qualification	Andorra	1–4	Poland	Andorra la Vella, Andorra
20:45	Vales 45'	Report	Lewandowski 5', 73'; Jóźwiak 11'; Milik 45+2'	Stadium: Estadi Nacional; Attendance: 1,049; Referee: John Beaton (Scotland)

15 November 2022 FIFA World Cup qualification	Albania	1–0	Andorra	Tirana, Albania
20:45	Çekiçi 73' (pen.)	Report		Stadium: Arena Kombëtare; Attendance: 75; Referee: Andris Treimanis (Latvia)

=== 2022 ===
25 March Friendly	Andorra	1–0	Saint Kitts and Nevis	Andorra la Vella, Andorra
20:45 UTC+1	Aláez 45+1'	Report		Stadium: Estadi Nacional; Referee: Jesús Gil Manzano (Spain)

28 March Friendly	Andorra	1–0	Grenada	Andorra la Vella, Andorra
20:00 UTC+2	Bernat 58'	Report		Stadium: Estadi Nacional; Referee: César Soto Grado (Spain)

3 June 2022–23 UEFA Nations League	Latvia	3–0	Andorra	Riga, Latvia
21:45 UTC+3	Uldriķis 9', 77'; Ikaunieks 85' (pen.)	Report		Stadium: Daugava Stadium; Attendance: 5,863; Referee: Tomasz Musiał (Poland)

6 June 2022–23 UEFA Nations League	Andorra	0–0	Moldova	Andorra la Vella, Andorra
20:45 UTC+2		Report		Stadium: Estadi Nacional; Attendance: 756; Referee: Lionel Tschudi (Switzerland)

10 June 2022–23 UEFA Nations League	Andorra	2–1	Liechtenstein	Andorra la Vella, Andorra
20:45 UTC+2	Aláez 78' (pen.); Rubio 82'	Report	Meier 90+3'	Stadium: Estadi Nacional; Attendance: 932; Referee: Nejc Kajtazović (Slovenia)

14 June 2022–23 UEFA Nations League	Moldova	2–1	Andorra	Chișinău, Moldova
19:00 UTC+3	Caimacov 26' (pen.); Nicolaescu 50' (pen.)	Report	M. Vieira 45+4'	Stadium: Zimbru Stadium; Attendance: 4,275; Referee: Peter Kjaesgaard (Denmark)

22 September 2022–23 UEFA Nations League	Liechtenstein	0–2	Andorra	Vaduz, Liechtenstein
20:45 UTC+2		Report	Rosas 4'; Cervós 80'	Stadium: Rheinpark Stadion; Attendance: 914; Referee: Juxhin Xhaja (Albania)

25 September 2022–23 UEFA Nations League	Andorra	1–1	Latvia	Andorra la Vella, Andorra
15:00 UTC+2	Rosas 88'	Report	Gutkovskis 50'	Stadium: Estadi Nacional; Attendance: 1,102; Referee: Anastasios Papapetrou (Greece)

16 November Friendly	Andorra	0–1	Austria	Málaga, Spain
18:00 UTC+1		Report	Arnautović 87'	Stadium: La Rosaleda Stadium; Attendance: 150; Referee: José Luis Munuera Montero (Spain)

19 November Friendly	Gibraltar	1–0	Andorra	Gibraltar
18:00 UTC+1	Chipolina 36'	Report		Stadium: Victoria Stadium; Attendance: 2,006; Referee: Abdullah Al Kandari (Kuwait)

=== 2023 ===
25 March UEFA Euro 2024 qualifying	Andorra	0–2	Romania	Andorra la Vella, Andorra
20:45		Report	Man 35'; Alibec 49'	Stadium: Estadi Nacional; Attendance: 2,927; Referee: Dario Bel (Croatia)

28 March UEFA Euro 2024 qualifying	Kosovo	1–1	Andorra	Pristina, Kosovo
20:45	Zhegrova 59'	Report	Rosas 61'	Stadium: Stadiumi Fadil Vokrri; Attendance: 12,600; Referee: Sebastian Gishamer (Austria)

16 June UEFA Euro 2024 qualifying	Andorra	1–2	Switzerland	Andorra la Vella, Andorra
20:45	Vieira 67'	Report	Freuler 7'; Amdouni 32'	Stadium: Estadi Nacional; Attendance: 2,490; Referee: Balázs Berke (Hungary)

19 June UEFA Euro 2024 qualifying	Israel	2–1	Andorra	Jerusalem, Israel
20:45 (21:45 UTC+3)	Shlomo 42'; Solomon 61'	Report	Rosas 52'	Stadium: Teddy Stadium; Attendance: 13,300; Referee: Dragomir Draganov (Bulgaria)

9 September UEFA Euro 2024 qualifying	Andorra	0–0	Belarus	Andorra la Vella, Andorra
18:00		Report		Stadium: Estadi Nacional; Attendance: 1,026; Referee: Eldorjan Hamiti (Albania)

12 September UEFA Euro 2024 qualifying	Switzerland	3–0	Andorra	Sion, Switzerland
20:45	Itten 49'; Xhaka 84'; Shaqiri 90+3' (pen.)	Report		Stadium: Stade Tourbillon; Attendance: 9,000; Referee: Elchin Masiyev (Azerbaijan)

12 October UEFA Euro 2024 qualifying	Andorra	0–3	Kosovo	Andorra la Vella, Andorra
20:45		Report	Rashica 26', 71'; Zeqiri 83'	Stadium: Estadi Nacional; Attendance: 1,207; Referee: Nick Walsh (Scotland)

15 October UEFA Euro 2024 qualifying	Romania	4–0	Andorra	Bucharest, Romania
20:45 (21:45 UTC+3)	Stanciu 23'; Hagi 28'; R. Marin 44' (pen.); Coman 50'	Report		Stadium: Arena Națională; Attendance: 21,723; Referee: Kristo Tohver (Estonia)

18 November UEFA Euro 2024 qualifying	Belarus	1–0	Andorra	Budapest, Hungary
18:00	Laptev 83'	Report		Stadium: Szusza Ferenc Stadion; Attendance: 0 Referee: Bulat Sariyev (Kazakhstan)

21 November UEFA Euro 2024 qualifying	Andorra	0–2	Israel	Andorra la Vella, Andorra
20:45		Report	Cervós 29' (o.g.); Kinda 81'	Stadium: Estadi Nacional; Attendance: 568; Referee: Sascha Stegemann (Germany)

=== 2024 ===
21 March 2024 FIFA Series	Andorra	1–1	South Africa	Annaba, Algeria
22:00 UTC+1	R. Fernández 5'	Report	Mokwana 25'	Stadium: 19 May 1956 Stadium; Attendance: 2,500; Referee: Nabil Boukhalfa (Algeria)

25 March 2024 FIFA Series	Bolivia	1–0	Andorra	Annaba, Algeria
22:00 UTC+1	Vaca 13'	Report		Stadium: 19 May 1956 Stadium; Attendance: 2.500; Referee: Houssam Benyahia (Algeria)

5 June Friendly	Spain	5–0	Andorra	Badajoz, Spain
21:30 UTC+2	Pérez 24'; Oyarzabal 53', 66', 73'; F. Torres 81'	Report		Stadium: Estadio Nuevo Vivero; Attendance: 14,300; Referee: Gustavo Correia (Portugal)

11 June Friendly	Northern Ireland	2–0	Andorra	Murcia, Spain
20:45 UTC+2	Bradley 16', 22'	Report		Stadium: Estadio Nueva Condomina; Attendance: 500; Referee: Jason Barcelo (Gibraltar)

4 September Friendly	Gibraltar	1–0	Andorra	Europa Point, Gibraltar
18:00 UTC+2	Bent 18'	Report		Stadium: Europa Point Stadium; Referee: Tom Owen (Wales)

10 September 2024–25 UEFA Nations League	Andorra	0–1	Malta	Andorra la Vella, Andorra
20:45 UTC+2		Report	Camenzuli 45'	Stadium: Estadi Nacional; Attendance: 812; Referee: Mohammed Al-Hakim (Sweden)

10 October 2024–25 UEFA Nations League	Moldova	2–0	Andorra	Chișinău, Moldova
18:00 (19:00 UTC+3)	Ioniță 31'; Cojocaru 90+5'	Report		Stadium: Stadionul Zimbru; Attendance: 6,442; Referee: Miloš Milanović (Serbia)

13 October Friendly	Andorra	2–0	San Marino	Andorra la Vella, Andorra
18:00	A. Rosas 10'; M. Pujol 39'	Report		Stadium: Estadi Nacional; Referee: Juan Martínez Munuera (Spain)

16 November 2024–25 UEFA Nations League	Andorra	0–1	Moldova	Andorra la Vella, Andorra
18:00		Report	Postolachi 90+2'	Stadium: Estadi Nacional; Attendance: 984; Referee: Bulat Sariyev (Kazakhstan)

19 November 2024–25 UEFA Nations League	Malta	0–0	Andorra	Ta' Qali, Malta
20:45		Report		Stadium: National Stadium; Attendance: 3,142; Referee: Luka Bilbija (Bosnia and Herzegovina)

=== 2025 ===
21 March 2026 FIFA World Cup qualification	Andorra	0–1	Latvia	Andorra la Vella, Andorra
20:45		Report	Šits 58'	Stadium: Estadi Nacional; Attendance: 957; Referee: Giorgi Kruashvili (Georgia)

24 March 2026 FIFA World Cup qualification	Albania	3–0	Andorra	Tirana, Albania
20:45	Manaj 9', 19'; Uzuni 90+2'	Report		Stadium: Arena Kombëtare; Attendance: 17,183; Referee: Sebastian Gishamer (Austria)

7 June 2026 FIFA World Cup qualification	Andorra	0–1	England	Barcelona, Spain
18:00		Report	Kane 50'	Stadium: RCDE Stadium; Attendance: 8,872; Referee: Igor Pajač (Croatia)

10 June 2026 FIFA World Cup qualification	Serbia	3–0	Andorra	Leskovac, Serbia
20:45	A. Mitrović 12', 24', 53' (pen.)	Report		Stadium: Gradski stadion Dubočica; Attendance: 7,576; Referee: Aliyar Aghayev (Azerbaijan)

6 September 2026 FIFA World Cup qualification	England	2–0	Andorra	Birmingham, England
17:00	García 25' (o.g.); Rice 67'	Report		Stadium: Villa Park; Attendance: 39,202; Referee: Mohammad Al-Emara (Finland)

9 September Friendly	Estonia	0–0	Andorra	Tallinn, Estonia
19:00 UTC+3		Report		Stadium: Lilleküla Stadium; Attendance: 4,641; Referee: Oliver Reitala (Finland)

11 October 2026 FIFA World Cup qualification	Latvia	2–2	Andorra	Riga, Latvia
16:00	Zelenkovs 41'; Gutkovskis 55' (pen.)	Report	San Nicolás 33'; Olivera 78'	Stadium: Daugava Stadium; Attendance: 5,027; Referee: Georgi Kabakov (Bulgaria)

14 October 2026 FIFA World Cup qualification	Andorra	1–3	Serbia	Encamp, Andorra
20:45	López 17'	Report	Garcia 19' (o.g.); Vlahović 54'; Mitrović 77' (pen.)	Stadium: Estadi de la FAF; Attendance: 987; Referee: Anastasios Papapetrou (Greece)

13 November 2026 FIFA World Cup qualification	Andorra	0–1	Albania	Encamp, Andorra
20:45		Report	Asllani 67'	Stadium: Estadi de la FAF; Attendance: 2,225; Referee: Horațiu Feșnic (Romania)

17 November Friendly	Finland	4–0	Andorra	Tampere, Finland
19:00 UTC+2	Antman 18'; Pukki 26'; Pyyhtiä 68'; Walta 90+2'	Report		Stadium: Tammelan Stadion; Attendance: 5,500; Referee: Joonas Jaanovits (Estonia)

=== 2026 ===
27 March Friendly	Montenegro	2–0	Andorra	Podgorica, Montenegro
18:00 UTC+1	Mugoša 41' (pen.); Osmajić 80'	Report		Stadium: Podgorica City Stadium; Attendance: 1,855; Referee: Enea Jorgji (Albania)

31 March Friendly	San Marino	0–0	Andorra	Serravalle, San Marino
--:-- UTC+2				Stadium: San Marino Stadium; Attendance: 361; Referee: Kyriakos Athanasiou (Cyprus)

29 May Friendly	Andorra	0–1	Iraq	Girona, Spain
18:00 UTC+2		Report	Yousif 20'	Stadium: Estadi Montilivi; Referee: Ricardo De Burgos Bengoetxea (Spain)

4 June Friendly	Andorra	2–0	Liechtenstein	Encamp, Andorra
19:00 UTC+2	Martínez 74'; Aláez 81' (pen.)	Report		Stadium: Estadi de la FAF; Attendance: 1,000; Referee: Javier Alberola Rojas (Spain)

7 June Friendly	Kosovo	3–0	Andorra	Pristina, Kosovo
20:00 UTC+2	Álvarez 41' (o.g.); Al.Rrahmani 53' (pen.); Matoshi 78'	Report		Stadium: Fadil Vokrri Stadium; Attendance: 5,000; Referee: Juxhin Xhaja (Albania)

24 September 2026–27 UEFA Nations League	Andorra	1–2	Malta	Encamp, Andorra
20:45 UTC+2	G.López 17'	Report	Cardona 36'	Stadium: Estadi de la FAF; Attendance: 905; Referee: Joey Kooij (Netherlands)

27 September 2026–27 UEFA Nations League	Gibraltar	0–0	Andorra	Europa Point, Gibraltar
18:00 UTC+2		Report		Stadium: Europa Sports Park; Attendance: 1,382; Referee: Genc Nuza (Kosovo)

30 September Friendly	Lithuania	3–0	Andorra	Kaunas, Lithuania
19:00 UTC+3	Ruzgis 21' (pen.); Steponavičius 27'; Kučys 46'	Report		Stadium: Darius and Girėnas Stadium; Referee: Andris Treimanis (Latvia)

4 October 2026–27 UEFA Nations League	Malta	1–0	Andorra	Ta' Qali, Malta
18:00 UTC+2	Teuma 49'	Report		Stadium: National Stadium; Attendance: 5,894; Referee: Mikkel Redder (Denmark)

13 November 2026–27 UEFA Nations League	Andorra	2–0	Gibraltar	Encamp, Andorra
20:45 UTC+1	López 24'; Rosas 35'	Report		Stadium: Estadi de la FAF; Attendance: 710; Referee: Rob Hennessy (Ireland)

16 November Friendly	Andorra	1–3	Azerbaijan	Encamp, Andorra
19:00 UTC+1	Fernández 55'	Report	Ahmadov 2'; Qurbanlı 47'; T. Bayramov 70' (pen.)	Stadium: Estadi de la FAF; Referee: José Luis Munuera Montero (Spain)

== Upcoming matches ==
The following matches are currently scheduled:
