= Moldova national football team results (2020–present) =

- Win Draw Loss

This article provides details of international football games played by the Moldova national football team from 2020 to present.

== Results ==
=== 2020 ===
| 9 January Friendly | Sweden | 1–0 | Moldova | Doha, Qatar |
| 20:00 | Larsson 32' | Report | | Stadium: Hamad bin Khalifa Stadium; Attendance: 100; Referee: Saoud Al-Athba (Qatar) |

| 26 March Friendly | Moldova | Cancelled | Andorra |

| 3 September 2020–21 UEFA Nations League C | Moldova | 1–1 | Kosovo | Parma, Italy |
| 20:45 | Nicolaescu 20' | Report | Kololli 71' | Stadium: Stadio Ennio Tardini (Note: The match between Moldova and Kosovo was played on neutral venue as there were no diplomatic relations between the two countries.); Attendance: 0 (Note: Due to the COVID-19 pandemic in Europe, all matches scheduled for September 2020 were played behind closed doors.); Referee: Kai Erik Steen (Norway) |

| 6 September 2020–21 UEFA Nations League C | Slovenia | 1–0 | Moldova | Ljubljana, Slovenia |
| 18:00 | Bohar 28' | Report | | Stadium: Stožice Stadium; Attendance: 0 Referee: Jérôme Brisard (France) |

| 7 October Friendly | Italy | 6–0 | Moldova | Parma, Italy |
| 20:45 | Cristante 18'; Caputo 23'; El Shaarawy 30', 45+1'; Posmac 37' (o.g.); Berardi 72' | Report | | Stadium: Stadio Ennio Tardini; Attendance: 600; Referee: Daniel Siebert (Germany) |

| 11 October 2020–21 UEFA Nations League C | Greece | 2–0 | Moldova | Athens, Greece |
| 20:45 | Bakasetas 45+3' (pen.); Mantalos 50' | Report | | Stadium: Athens Olympic Stadium; Attendance: 0 (Note: Due to the COVID-19 pandemic in Europe, the match was played behind closed doors.); Referee: Dennis Higler (Netherlands) |

| 14 October 2020–21 UEFA Nations League C | Moldova | 0–4 | Slovenia | Chișinău, Moldova |
| 20:45 | | Report | Lovrić 8'; Vučkić 37' (pen.), 42', 55' (pen.) | Stadium: Stadionul Zimbru; Attendance: 105; Referee: João Pinheiro (Portugal) |

| 12 November Friendly | Moldova | 0–0 | Russia | Chișinău, Moldova |
| 19:00 | | Report | | Stadium: Stadionul Zimbru; Attendance: 0 Referee: Radu Petrescu (Romania) |
Note: Match originally scheduled for 31 March 2020, but postponed due to a spike in COVID-19 cases.

| 15 November 2020–21 UEFA Nations League C | Moldova | 0–2 | Greece | Chișinău, Moldova |
| 21:45 | | Report | Fortounis 32'; Bakasetas 41' | Stadium: Stadionul Zimbru; Attendance: 0 Referee: Fran Jović (Croatia) |

| 18 November 2020–21 UEFA Nations League C | Kosovo | 1–0 | Moldova | Pristina, Kosovo |
| 20:45 | Kastrati 31' | Report | | Stadium: Fadil Vokrri Stadium; Attendance: 0 Referee: Roomer Tarajev (Estonia) |

=== 2021 ===
| 25 March 2022 FIFA World Cup qualifying | Moldova | 1–1 | Faroe Islands | Chișinău, Moldova |
| 20:45 | Nicolaescu 9' | Report | M. Olsen 83' | Stadium: Stadionul Zimbru; Attendance: 0 Referee: Iwan Arwel Griffith (Wales) |

| 28 March 2022 FIFA World Cup qualifying | Denmark | 8–0 | Moldova | Herning, Denmark |
| 18:00 | Dolberg 19' (pen.), 48'; Damsgaard 21', 29'; Larsen 35'; Jensen 39'; Skov 81'; Ingvartsen 89' | Report | | Stadium: MCH Arena; Attendance: 0 Referee: Aliyar Aghayev (Azerbaijan) |

| 31 March 2022 FIFA World Cup qualifying | Moldova | 1–4 | Israel | Chișinău, Moldova |
| 21:45 | Carp 29' | Report | Zahavi 45+2'; Solomon 57'; Dabbur 64'; Natkho 66' | Stadium: Stadionul Zimbru; Attendance: 0 Referee: Bojan Pandžić (Sweden) |

| 3 June Friendly | Turkey | 2–0 | Moldova | Paderborn, Germany |
| 19:00 UTC+2 | Yılmaz 58'; Ünder 77' | Report | | Stadium: Benteler-Arena; Attendance: 0 Referee: Sascha Stegemann (Germany) |

| 6 June Friendly | Moldova | 1–0 | Azerbaijan | Chișinău, Moldova |
| 19:00 UTC+3 | Damașcan 8' | Report | | Stadium: Stadionul Zimbru; Attendance: 2,130; Referee: Marian Barbu (Romania) |

| 1 September 2022 FIFA World Cup qualifying | Moldova | 0–2 | Austria | Chișinău, Moldova |
| 22:15 UTC+3 (Note: The Moldova v Austria match, originally to be played at 20:45 UTC+2, was delayed by 30 minutes because a drone invaded the pitch.) | | Report | Baumgartner 45+1'; Arnautović 90+4' | Stadium: Stadionul Zimbru; Attendance: 3,945; Referee: Paul Tierney (England) |

| 4 September 2022 FIFA World Cup qualifying | Scotland | 1–0 | Moldova | Glasgow, Scotland |
| 20:45 UTC+1 | Dykes 14' | Report | | Stadium: Hampden Park; Attendance: 40,869; Referee: Lawrence Visser (Belgium) |

| 7 September 2022 FIFA World Cup qualifying | Faroe Islands | 2–1 | Moldova | Tórshavn, Faroe Islands |
| 20:45 | K. Olsen 68'; Vatnsdal 72' | Report | Milinceanu 84' | Stadium: Tórsvøllur; Attendance: 2,714; Referee: Ricardo de Burgos (Spain) |

| 9 October 2022 FIFA World Cup qualifying | Moldova | 0–4 | Denmark | Chișinău, Moldova |
| 20:45 | | Report | Skov Olsen 23'; Kjær 34' (pen.); Nørgaard 39'; Mæhle 44' | Stadium: Stadionul Zimbru; Attendance: 2,642; Referee: João Pinheiro (Portugal) |

| 12 October 2022 FIFA World Cup qualifying | Israel | 2–1 | Moldova | Be'er Sheva, Israel |
| 21:45 (21:45 UTC+3) | Zahavi 28'; Dabbur 49' | Report | Nicolaescu 90+4' | Stadium: Turner Stadium; Attendance: 9,000; Referee: Andris Treimanis (Latvia) |

| 12 November 2022 FIFA World Cup qualifying | Moldova | 0–2 | Scotland | Chișinău, Moldova |
| 20:45 | | Report | Patterson 38'; Adams 65' | Stadium: Stadionul Zimbru; Attendance: 3,642; Referee: Srđan Jovanović (Serbia) |

| 15 November 2022 FIFA World Cup qualifying | Austria | 4–1 | Moldova | Klagenfurt, Austria |
| 20:45 | Arnautović 4', 55' (pen.); Trimmel 22'; Ljubicic 83' | Report | Nicolaescu 60' | Stadium: Wörthersee Stadion; Attendance: 1,800; Referee: Aleksandar Stavrev (North Macedonia) |

=== 2022 ===
| 18 January Friendly | Moldova | 2–3 | Uganda | Belek, Turkey |
| 17:00 UTC+3 | Mandrîcenco 10'; Plătică 13' | Report | Kaddu 34' (pen.), 74' (pen.); Karisa 64' | Stadium: Titanic Deluxe Belek Football Center; Attendance: 100; Referee: Meliz Özçiğdem (Turkey) |

| 21 January Friendly | South Korea | 4–0 | Moldova | Antalya, Turkey |
| 14:00 UTC+3 | Kim Jin-kyu 20'; Paik Seung-ho 33'; Kwon Chang-hoon 48'; Cho Young-wook 90+3' (pen.) | Report | | Stadium: Mardan Sports Complex; Attendance: 0 Referee: Abdulkadir Bitigen (Turkey) |

| 24 March 2020–21 UEFA Nations League C play-outs | Moldova | 1–2 | Kazakhstan | Chișinău, Moldova |
| 19:00 UTC+2 | Nicolaescu 45+1' | Report | Malyi 63'; Posmac 79' (o.g.) | Stadium: Stadionul Zimbru; Attendance: 5,387; Referee: Anastasios Sidiropoulos (Greece) |

| 29 March 2020–21 UEFA Nations League C play-outs | Kazakhstan | 0–1 (a.e.t.) (2–2 agg.) (5–4 p) | Moldova | Nur-Sultan, Kazakhstan |
| 20:00 UTC+6 | | Report | Armaș 13' | Stadium: Astana Arena; Attendance: 12,582; Referee: Ivan Kružliak (Slovakia) |
| | Penalties |
| | Abiken (penalty scored); Beysebekov (penalty missed); Dosmagambetov (penalty scored); Zaynutdinov (penalty scored); Zhaksylykov (penalty scored); Zhukov (penalty scored) | | (penalty scored) Caimacov; (penalty scored) Armaș; (penalty scored) Mandrîcenco; (penalty scored) Crăciun; (penalty missed) Nicolaescu; (penalty missed) Revenco |

| 3 June 2022–23 UEFA Nations League D | Liechtenstein | 0–2 | Moldova | Vaduz, Liechtenstein |
| 20:45 UTC+2 | | Report | Nicolaescu 5' (pen.); Bolohan 90+1' | Stadium: Rheinpark Stadion; Attendance: 903; Referee: Giorgi Kruashvili (Georgia) |

| 6 June 2022–23 UEFA Nations League D | Andorra | 0–0 | Moldova | Andorra la Vella, Andorra |
| 20:45 UTC+2 | | Report | | Stadium: Estadi Nacional; Attendance: 756; Referee: Lionel Tschudi (Switzerland) |

| 10 June 2022–23 UEFA Nations League D | Moldova | 2–4 | Latvia | Chișinău, Moldova |
| 19:00 UTC+3 | Nicolaescu 5' (pen.); Moțpan 64' | Report | Gutkovskis 19', 60'; J. Ikaunieks 26', 75' | Stadium: Stadionul Zimbru; Attendance: 4,842; Referee: Andrew Madley (England) |

| 14 June 2022–23 UEFA Nations League D | Moldova | 2–1 | Andorra | Chișinău, Moldova |
| 19:00 UTC+3 | Caimacov 26' (pen.); Nicolaescu 50' (pen.) | Report | M. Vieira 45+4' | Stadium: Stadionul Zimbru; Attendance: 4,275; Referee: Peter Kjaesgaard (Denmark) |

| 22 September 2022–23 UEFA Nations League D | Latvia | 1–2 | Moldova | Riga, Latvia |
| 21:45 UTC+3 | J. Ikaunieks 55' | Report | Revenco 26'; Nicolaescu 45' | Stadium: Daugava Stadium; Attendance: 6,712; Referee: António Nobre (Portugal) |

| 25 September 2022–23 UEFA Nations League D | Moldova | 2–0 | Liechtenstein | Chișinău, Moldova |
| 16:00 UTC+3 | Stînă 90+2', 90+4' | Report | | Stadium: Stadionul Zimbru; Attendance: 5,774; Referee: Stéphanie Frappart (France) |

| 16 November Friendly | Moldova | 1–2 | Azerbaijan | Chişinău, Moldova |
| 19:00 UTC+2 | Moțpan 90+2' | Report | Mahmudov 28'; Isayev 42' | Stadium: Stadionul Zimbru; Attendance: 3,742; Referee: Denys Shurman (Ukraine) |

| 20 November Friendly | Moldova | 0–5 | Romania | Chişinău, Moldova |
| 20:30 UTC+2 | | Report | Moruțan 9'; Drăguș 40'; Cicâldău 61'; Paraschiv 71' (pen.); Rus 88' | Stadium: Stadionul Zimbru; Attendance: 6,145; Referee: Yaşar Kemal Uğurlu (Turkey) |

=== 2023 ===
| 24 March UEFA Euro 2024 qualifying | Moldova | 1–1 | Faroe Islands | Chișinău, Moldova |
| 21:45 UTC+2 | Nicolaescu 87' (pen.) | Report | Mikkelsen 27' | Stadium: Stadionul Zimbru; Attendance: 4,732; Referee: Nick Walsh (Scotland) |

| 27 March UEFA Euro 2024 qualifying | Moldova | 0–0 | Czech Republic | Chișinău, Moldova |
| 21:45 UTC+3 | | Report | | Stadium: Stadionul Zimbru; Attendance: 5,120; Referee: Daniel Schlager (Germany) |

| 17 June UEFA Euro 2024 qualifying | Albania | 2–0 | Moldova | Tirana, Albania |
| 20:45 UTC+2 | Asani 52'; Bajrami 76' | Report | | Stadium: Arena Kombëtare; Attendance: 20,944; Referee: Dennis Higler (Netherlands) |

| 20 June UEFA Euro 2024 qualifying | Moldova | 3–2 | Poland | Chișinău, Moldova |
| 21:45 UTC+3 | Nicolaescu 48', 79'; Baboglo 85' | Report | Milik 12'; Lewandowski 34' | Stadium: Stadionul Zimbru; Attendance: 9,442; Referee: Filip Glova (Slovakia) |

| 7 September Friendly | Austria | 1–1 | Moldova | Linz, Austria |
| 20:30 UTC+2 | Gregoritsch 50' | Report | Damașcan 3' | Stadium: Raiffeisen Arena; Attendance: 13,200; Referee: Robert Jones (England) |

| 10 September UEFA Euro 2024 qualifying | Faroe Islands | 0–1 | Moldova | Tórshavn, Faroe Islands |
| 17:00 UTC+1 | | Report | Rață 53' | Stadium: Tórsvøllur; Attendance: 2,710; Referee: Vassilios Fotias (Greece) |

| 12 October Friendly | Sweden | 3–1 | Moldova | Solna, Sweden |
| 19:00 UTC+2 | Karlsson 9', 74'; Largerbielke 18' | Report | Nicolaescu 39' | Stadium: Friends Arena; Attendance: 10,097; Referee: Antti Munukka (Finland) |

| 15 October UEFA Euro 2024 qualifying | Poland | 1–1 | Moldova | Warsaw, Poland |
| 20:45 UTC+2 | Świderski 53' | Report | Nicolaescu 26' | Stadium: Stadion Narodowy; Attendance: 51,672; Referee: Artur Soares Dias (Portugal) |

| 17 November UEFA Euro 2024 qualifying | Moldova | 1–1 | Albania | Chișinău, Moldova |
| 19:00 UTC+2 | Baboglo 87' | Report | Çikalleshi 25' (pen.) | Stadium: Stadionul Zimbru; Attendance: 9,537; Referee: Willie Collum (Scotland) |

| 20 November UEFA Euro 2024 qualifying | Czech Republic | 3–0 | Moldova | Olomouc, Czech Republic |
| 20:45 UTC+1 | Douděra 14'; Chorý 72'; Souček 90' | Report | | Stadium: Andrův Stadion; Attendance: 11,653; Referee: Sandro Schärer (Switzerland) |

=== 2024 ===
| 22 March Friendly | North Macedonia | 1–1 | Moldova | Antalya, Turkey |
| 17:30 UTC+3 | Miovski 45+1' | Report | Damașcan 82' | Stadium: Mardan Sports Complex; Attendance: 100; Referee: Damian Kos (Poland) |

| 26 March Friendly | Cayman Islands | 0–4 | Moldova | Antalya, Turkey |
| 17:00 UTC+3 | | Report | Damașcan 28'; Ioniță 31'; Nicolaescu 52' (pen.); Bogaciuc 90+3' | Stadium: Mardan Sports Complex; Attendance: 100; Referee: Kadir Sağlam (Turkey) |

| 8 June Friendly | Moldova | 3–2 | Cyprus | Chișinău, Moldova |
| 19:00 UTC+3 | Moțpan 44'; Stînă 71'; Bogaciuc 78' | Report | Špoljarić 51'; Pittas 53' | Stadium: Stadionul Zimbru; Attendance: 4,000; Referee: Denys Shurman (Ukraine) |

| 11 June Friendly | Moldova | 0–4 | Ukraine | Chișinău, Moldova |
| 19:00 UTC+3 | | Report | Yaremchuk 2'; Tsyhankov 43'; Dovbyk 49'; Sudakov 54' | Stadium: Stadionul Zimbru; Attendance: 9,500; Referee: Andrei Chivulete (Romania) |

| 7 September 2024–25 UEFA Nations League D | Moldova | 2–0 | Malta | Chișinău, Moldova |
| 19:00 UTC+3 | Caimacov 32'; Nicolaescu 45+4' (pen.) | Report | | Stadium: Stadionul Zimbru; Attendance: 6,142; Referee: Mykola Balakin (Ukraine) |

| 10 September Friendly | Moldova | 1–0 | San Marino | Chișinău, Moldova |
| 19:00 UTC+3 | Rață 10' | Report | | Stadium: Stadionul Zimbru; Attendance: 4,742; Referee: Dmytro Kubriak (Ukraine) |

| 10 October 2024–25 UEFA Nations League D | Moldova | 2–0 | Andorra | Chișinău, Moldova |
| 19:00 UTC+3 | Ioniță 31'; Cojocaru 90+5' | Report | | Stadium: Stadionul Zimbru; Attendance: 6,442; Referee: Miloš Milanović (Serbia) |

| 13 October 2024–25 UEFA Nations League D | Malta | 1–0 | Moldova | Ta' Qali, Malta |
| 18:00 UTC+2 | Teuma 87' (pen.) | Report | | Stadium: National Stadium; Attendance: 5,754; Referee: John Brooks (England) |

| 16 November 2024–25 UEFA Nations League D | Andorra | 0–1 | Moldova | Andorra la Vella, Andorra |
| 18:00 UTC+1 | | Report | Postolachi 90+2' | Stadium: Estadi Nacional; Attendance: 984; Referee: Bulat Sariyev (Kazakhstan) |

| 19 November Friendly | Gibraltar | 1–1 | Moldova | Europa Point, Gibraltar |
| 18:00 UTC+1 | Walker 68' (pen.) | Report | Mudrac 40' | Stadium: Europa Point Stadium; Attendance: 580; Referee: Antoine Chiaramonti (Andorra) |

=== 2025 ===
| 22 March 2026 FIFA World Cup qualifying | Moldova | 0–5 | Norway | Chișinău, Moldova |
| 19:00 UTC+2 | | Report (FIFA); Report (UEFA) | Ryerson 5'; Haaland 23'; Aasgaard 38'; Sørloth 43'; Dønnum 69' | Stadium: Stadionul Zimbru; Attendance: 9,342; Referee: Matej Jug (Slovenia) |

| 25 March 2026 FIFA World Cup qualifying | Moldova | 2–3 | Estonia | Chișinău, Moldova |
| 19:00 UTC+2 | Nicolaescu 67'; Caimacov 90+1' | Report (FIFA); Report (UEFA) | Peetson 19'; Sappinen 30'; Käit 70' | Stadium: Stadionul Zimbru; Attendance: 6,112; Referee: Lawrence Visser (Belgium) |

| 6 June Friendly | Poland | 2–0 | Moldova | Chorzów, Poland |
| 20:45 UTC+2 | Cash 30'; Slisz 88' | Report | | Stadium: Stadion Śląski; Attendance: 36,357; Referee: David Dickinson (Scotland) |

| 9 June 2026 FIFA World Cup qualifying | Italy | 2–0 | Moldova | Reggio Emilia, Italy |
| 20:45 UTC+2 | Raspadori 40'; Cambiaso 50' | Report (FIFA); Report (UEFA) | | Stadium: Mapei Stadium – Città del Tricolore; Attendance: 18,771; Referee: Urs Schnyder (Switzerland) |

| 5 September 2026 FIFA World Cup qualifying | Moldova | 0–4 | Israel | Chișinău, Moldova |
| 21:45 UTC+3 | | Report (FIFA); Report (UEFA) | Peretz 15'; Solomon 35'; Baribo 59'; Gloukh 77' | Stadium: Stadionul Zimbru; Attendance: 7,242; Referee: John Beaton (Scotland) |

| 9 September 2026 FIFA World Cup qualifying | Norway | 11–1 | Moldova | Oslo, Norway |
| 20:45 UTC+1 | Horn Myhre 6'; Haaland 11', 36', 43', 52', 83'; Ødegaard 45+1'; Aasgaard 67', 76', 79' (pen.), 90+1' | Report (FIFA); Report (UEFA) | Østigård 74' (o.g.) | Stadium: Ullevaal Stadion; Attendance: 24,605; Referee: Balázs Berke (Hungary) |

| 9 October Friendly | Romania | 2–1 | Moldova | Bucharest, Romania |
| 21:00 (UTC+3) | Munteanu 12'; Hagi 44' | Report | Radu 38' (o.g.) | Stadium: Arena Națională; Attendance: 11,232; Referee: Ishmael Barbara (Malta) |

| 14 October 2026 FIFA World Cup qualifying | Estonia | 1–1 | Moldova | Tallinn, Estonia |
| 21:45 UTC+3 | Käit 12' | Report (FIFA); Report (UEFA) | Bodișteanu 64' | Stadium: Lilleküla Stadium; Attendance: 4,731; Referee: Igor Pajač (Croatia) |

| 13 November 2026 FIFA World Cup qualifying | Moldova | 0–2 | Italy | Chișinău, Moldova |
| 21:45 UTC+2 | | Report (FIFA); Report (UEFA) | Mancini 88'; Esposito 90+2' | Stadium: Stadionul Zimbru; Attendance: 9,526; Referee: Mykola Balakin (Ukraine) |

| 16 November 2026 FIFA World Cup qualifying | Israel | 4–1 | Moldova | Chișinău, Moldova (Note: Due to the Gaza war, Israel were required to play their home matches at neutral venues until further notice.) |
| 20:45 UTC+1 | Turgeman 21' (pen.); Revivo 65'; E. Peretz 85'; Baboglo 88' (o.g.) | Report (FIFA); Report (UEFA) | Nicolaescu 37' | Stadium: Stadionul Zimbru; Attendance: 3,312; Referee: Allard Lindhout (Netherlands) |

=== 2026 ===
| 26 March Friendly | Moldova | 0–2 | Lithuania | Chișinău, Moldova |
| 17:00 UTC+2 | | Report | Lasickas 33'; Gineitis 71' | Stadium: Stadionul Zimbru; Attendance: 4,328; Referee: Henrik Nalbandyan (Armenia) |

| 30 March Friendly | Cyprus | 3–2 | Moldova | Nicosia, Cyprus |
| 19:00 UTC+3 | Kastanos 5'; Charalampous 30', 44' | Report | Popescu 55'; Stînă 88' | Stadium: GSP Stadium; Referee: Marian Barbu (Romania) |

| 5 June Friendly | Moldova | 2–2 | Bulgaria | Chișinău, Moldova |
| 20:00 UTC+3 | Bogaciuc 60'; Baboglo 85' | Report | Rusev 23'; Petkov 76' | Stadium: Stadionul Zimbru; Attendance: 3,613; Referee: Tural Kurbanov (Azerbaijan) |

| 9 June Friendly | Armenia | 1–1 | Moldova | Yerevan, Armenia |
| 19:00 UTC+4 | Serobyan 89' | Report | Bogaciuc 90+1' | Stadium: Vazgen Sargsyan Republican Stadium; Attendance: 6,000; Referee: Aleko Aptsiauri (Georgia) |

| 26 September 2026–27 UEFA Nations League C | Slovakia | 2–0 | Moldova | Prešov, Slovakia |
| 20:45 UTC+2 | Schranz 32'; Duda 40' (pen.) | Report | | Stadium: Tatran Stadium; Attendance: 6,003; Referee: Juxhin Xhaja (Albania) |

| 29 September 2026–27 UEFA Nations League C | Moldova | 1–1 | Faroe Islands | Chișinău, Moldova |
| 21:45 UTC+3 | Perciun 66' | Report | Davidsen 27' (pen.) | Stadium: Stadionul Zimbru; Attendance: 4,542; Referee: Julian Weinberger (Austria) |

| 2 October 2026–27 UEFA Nations League C | Kazakhstan | 1–2 | Moldova | Astana, Kazakhstan |
| 19:00 UTC+5 | Alip 64' | Report | Cleșcenco 45+1'; Popescu 50' | Stadium: Astana Arena; Attendance: 20,119; Referee: Marian Barbu (Romania) |

| 6 October 2026–27 UEFA Nations League C | Moldova | 0–4 | Slovakia | Chișinău, Moldova |
| 21:45 UTC+3 | | Report | Strelec 8'; Suslov 44'; Hancko 60'; Haraslín 75' | Stadium: Stadionul Zimbru; Attendance: 5,942; Referee: Yigal Frid (Israel) |

| 13 November 2026–27 UEFA Nations League C | Moldova | 2–1 | Kazakhstan | Chișinău, Moldova |
| 21:45 UTC+2 | Popescu 39', 77' | Report | Chesnokov 51' | Stadium: Stadionul Zimbru; Attendance: 6,783; Referee: Andrea Colombo (Italy) |

| 16 November 2026–27 UEFA Nations League C | Faroe Islands | 1–0 | Moldova | Tórshavn, Faroe Islands |
| 15:00 UTC+0 | Samuelsen 24' | Report | | Stadium: Tórsvøllur; Attendance: 4,167; Referee: Enea Jorgji (Albania) |

== Upcoming matches ==
The following matches are currently scheduled:

== Head to head records ==
As of 16 November 2026

Head to head records
| Opponent | P | W | D | L | GF | GA | W% | L% |
| Albania | 2 | 0 | 1 | 1 | 1 | 3 | 0 | 50 |
| Andorra | 4 | 3 | 1 | 0 | 5 | 1 | 75 | 0 |
| Armenia | 1 | 0 | 1 | 0 | 1 | 1 | 0 | 0 |
| Austria | 3 | 0 | 1 | 2 | 2 | 7 | 0 | 66.67 |
| Azerbaijan | 2 | 1 | 0 | 1 | 2 | 2 | 50 | 50 |
| Bulgaria | 1 | 0 | 1 | 0 | 2 | 2 | 0 | 0 |
| Cayman Islands | 1 | 1 | 0 | 0 | 4 | 0 | 100 | 0 |
| Cyprus | 2 | 1 | 0 | 1 | 5 | 5 | 50 | 50 |
| Czech Republic | 2 | 0 | 1 | 1 | 0 | 3 | 0 | 50 |
| Denmark | 2 | 0 | 0 | 2 | 0 | 12 | 0 | 100 |
| Estonia | 1 | 0 | 1 | 1 | 3 | 4 | 0 | 50 |
| Faroe Islands | 6 | 1 | 3 | 2 | 5 | 6 | 16.67 | 33.33 |
| Gibraltar | 1 | 0 | 1 | 0 | 1 | 1 | 0 | 0 |
| Greece | 2 | 0 | 0 | 2 | 0 | 4 | 0 | 100 |
| Israel | 4 | 0 | 0 | 4 | 3 | 14 | 0 | 100 |
| Italy | 3 | 0 | 0 | 3 | 0 | 10 | 0 | 100 |
| Kazakhstan | 4 | 3 | 0 | 1 | 6 | 4 | 75 | 25 |
| Kosovo | 2 | 0 | 1 | 1 | 1 | 2 | 0 | 50 |
| Latvia | 2 | 1 | 0 | 1 | 4 | 5 | 50 | 50 |
| Liechtenstein | 2 | 2 | 0 | 0 | 4 | 0 | 100 | 0 |
| Lithuania | 1 | 0 | 0 | 1 | 0 | 2 | 0 | 100 |
| Malta | 2 | 1 | 0 | 1 | 2 | 1 | 50 | 50 |
| North Macedonia | 1 | 0 | 1 | 0 | 1 | 1 | 0 | 0 |
| Norway | 2 | 0 | 0 | 2 | 1 | 16 | 0 | 100 |
| Poland | 3 | 1 | 1 | 1 | 4 | 5 | 33.33 | 33.33 |
| Romania | 2 | 0 | 0 | 2 | 1 | 7 | 0 | 100 |
| Russia | 1 | 0 | 1 | 0 | 0 | 0 | 0 | 0 |
| San Marino | 1 | 1 | 0 | 0 | 1 | 0 | 100 | 0 |
| Scotland | 2 | 0 | 0 | 2 | 0 | 3 | 0 | 100 |
| Slovakia | 2 | 0 | 0 | 2 | 0 | 6 | 0 | 100 |
| Slovenia | 2 | 0 | 0 | 2 | 0 | 5 | 0 | 100 |
| South Korea | 1 | 0 | 0 | 1 | 0 | 4 | 0 | 100 |
| Sweden | 2 | 0 | 0 | 2 | 1 | 4 | 0 | 100 |
| Turkey | 1 | 0 | 0 | 1 | 0 | 2 | 0 | 100 |
| Uganda | 1 | 0 | 0 | 1 | 2 | 3 | 0 | 100 |
| Ukraine | 1 | 0 | 0 | 1 | 0 | 4 | 0 | 100 |
| Totals | 73 | 16 | 15 | 42 | 60 | 149 | 21.92 | 57.53 |
