= UEFA Euro 2024 qualifying Group I =

Group I of UEFA Euro 2024 qualifying was one of the ten groups to decide which teams would qualify for the UEFA Euro 2024 final tournament in Germany scheduled for June and July 2024. Group I consisted of six teams: Andorra, Belarus, Israel, Kosovo, Romania and Switzerland. The teams played against each other home and away in a round-robin format.

The top two teams, Romania and Switzerland, qualified directly for the final tournament. The participants of the qualifying play-offs were decided based on their performance in the 2022–23 UEFA Nations League.

== Standings ==
Pos	Team	Pld	W	D	L	GF	GA	GD	Pts	Qualification	(Romania)	(Switzerland)	(Israel)	(Belarus)	(Kosovo)	(Andorra)
1	Romania	10	6	4	0	16	5	+11	22	Qualify for final tournament	—	1–0	1–1	2–1	2–0	4–0
2	Switzerland	10	4	5	1	22	11	+11	17	Qualify for final tournament	2–2	—	3–0	3–3	1–1	3–0
3	Israel	10	4	3	3	11	11	0	15	Advance to play-offs via Nations League	1–2	1–1	—	1–0	1–1	2–1
4	Belarus	10	3	3	4	9	14	−5	12		0–0	0–5	1–2	—	2–1	1–0
5	Kosovo	10	2	5	3	10	10	0	11		0–0	2–2	1–0	0–1	—	1–1
6	Andorra	10	0	2	8	3	20	−17	2		0–2	1–2	0–2	0–0	0–3	—

Source: UEFA
Rules for classification: Qualification tiebreakers

== Matches ==
The fixture list was confirmed by UEFA on 10 October 2022, the day after the draw. Times are CET/CEST, (Note: CET (UTC+1) for matches until 25 March and from 29 October (matchday 1 and 9–10), and CEST (UTC+2) for matches from 26 March to 28 October 2023 (matchday 2–8).) as listed by UEFA (local times, if different, are in parentheses).

25 March 2023
18:00

Belarus	0–5	Switzerland
	Report	Steffen 4', 17', 29'; Xhaka 62'; Amdouni 65'

Karađorđe Stadium, Novi Sad (Serbia) (Note: Due to the Belarusian country's involvement in the Russian invasion of Ukraine, Belarus were required to play their home matches at neutral venues and behind closed doors until further notice.)
Attendance: 0
Referee: Alejandro Hernández Hernández (Spain)
25 March 2023
18:00 (20:00 UTC+3)

Israel	1–1	Kosovo
Peretz 56'	Report	Dasa 36' (o.g.)

Bloomfield Stadium, Tel Aviv
Attendance: 28,935
Referee: Willie Collum (Scotland)
25 March 2023
20:45

Andorra	0–2	Romania
	Report	Man 35'; Alibec 49'

Estadi Nacional, Andorra la Vella
Attendance: 2,927
Referee: Dario Bel (Croatia)

28 March 2023
20:45

Kosovo	1–1	Andorra
Zhegrova 59'	Report	Rosas 61'

Stadiumi Fadil Vokrri, Pristina
Attendance: 12,600
Referee: Sebastian Gishamer (Austria)
28 March 2023
20:45 (21:45 UTC+3)

Romania	2–1	Belarus
Stanciu 17'; Burcă 19'	Report	Morozov 86'

Arena Națională, Bucharest
Attendance: 27,837
Referee: Allard Lindhout (Netherlands)
28 March 2023
20:45

Switzerland	3–0	Israel
Vargas 39'; Amdouni 47'; Widmer 52'	Report

Stade de Genève, Geneva
Attendance: 14,819
Referee: Nikola Dabanović (Montenegro)

16 June 2023
20:45

Andorra	1–2	Switzerland
Vieira 67'	Report	Freuler 7'; Amdouni 32'

Estadi Nacional, Andorra la Vella
Attendance: 2,490
Referee: Balázs Berke (Hungary)
16 June 2023
20:45

Belarus	1–2	Israel
Ebong 16'	Report	Weissman 85' (pen.); Gloukh 90+2'

Szusza Ferenc Stadion, Budapest (Hungary)
Attendance: 0
Referee: Jarred Gillett (Australia)
16 June 2023
20:45

Kosovo	0–0	Romania
	Report

Stadiumi Fadil Vokrri, Pristina
Attendance: 11,000
Referee: Danny Makkelie (Netherlands)

19 June 2023
20:45

Belarus	2–1	Kosovo
Morozov 73'; Ebong 75'	Report	Muriqi 87' (pen.)

Szusza Ferenc Stadion, Budapest (Hungary)
Attendance: 0
Referee: Julian Weinberger (Austria)
19 June 2023
20:45 (21:45 UTC+3)

Israel	2–1	Andorra
Shlomo 42'; Solomon 61'	Report	Rosas 52'

Teddy Stadium, Jerusalem
Attendance: 13,300
Referee: Dragomir Draganov (Bulgaria)
19 June 2023
20:45

Switzerland	2–2	Romania
Amdouni 28', 41'	Report	Mihăilă 89', 90+2'

Swissporarena, Lucerne
Attendance: 14,400
Referee: Daniele Orsato (Italy)

9 September 2023
18:00

Andorra	0–0	Belarus
	Report

Estadi Nacional, Andorra la Vella
Attendance: 1,026
Referee: Eldorjan Hamiti (Albania)
9 September 2023
20:45

Kosovo	2–2	Switzerland
Muriqi 65', 90+4'	Report	Freuler 14', 79'

Stadiumi Fadil Vokrri, Pristina
Attendance: 12,700
Referee: Jakob Kehlet (Denmark)
9 September 2023
20:45 (21:45 UTC+3)

Romania	1–1	Israel
Alibec 27'	Report	Gloukh 53'

Arena Națională, Bucharest
Attendance: 49,193
Referee: Slavko Vinčić (Slovenia)

12 September 2023
20:45 (21:45 UTC+3)

Israel	1–0	Belarus
Kanichowsky 90+3'	Report

Bloomfield Stadium, Tel Aviv
Attendance: 28,435
Referee: Ricardo de Burgos Bengoetxea (Spain)
12 September 2023
20:45 (21:45 UTC+3)

Romania	2–0	Kosovo
Stanciu 83'; Mihăilă 90+3'	Report

Arena Națională, Bucharest
Attendance: 29,982
Referee: Willy Delajod (France)
12 September 2023
20:45

Switzerland	3–0	Andorra
Itten 49'; Xhaka 84'; Shaqiri 90+3' (pen.)	Report

Stade Tourbillon, Sion
Attendance: 9,000
Referee: Elchin Masiyev (Azerbaijan)

12 October 2023
20:45

Andorra	0–3	Kosovo
	Report	Rashica 26', 71'; Zeqiri 83'

Estadi Nacional, Andorra la Vella
Attendance: 1,207
Referee: Nick Walsh (Scotland)
12 October 2023
20:45

Belarus	0–0	Romania
	Report

Szusza Ferenc Stadion, Budapest (Hungary)
Attendance: 0
Referee: Espen Eskås (Norway)

15 October 2023
18:00

Switzerland	3–3	Belarus
Shaqiri 28'; Akanji 89'; Amdouni 90'	Report	Ebong 61'; Polyakov 69'; Antilevsky 84'

Kybunpark, St. Gallen
Attendance: 17,000
Referee: João Pinheiro (Portugal)
15 October 2023
20:45 (21:45 UTC+3)

Romania	4–0	Andorra
Stanciu 23'; Hagi 28'; R. Marin 44' (pen.); Coman 50'	Report

Arena Națională, Bucharest
Attendance: 21,723
Referee: Kristo Tohver (Estonia)

12 November 2023 (Note: The Kosovo v Israel match, originally scheduled to be played on 15 October 2023, was postponed to 12 November 2023 due to the Gaza war.)
20:45

Kosovo	1–0	Israel
Rashica 41'	Report

Stadiumi Fadil Vokrri, Pristina
Attendance: 5,245
Referee: Ivan Kružliak (Slovakia)

15 November 2023 (Note: The Israel v Switzerland match, originally scheduled to be played on 12 October 2023 at Bloomfield Stadium, Tel Aviv, was postponed to 15 November 2023 due to the Gaza war.)
20:45

Israel	1–1	Switzerland
Weissman 88'	Report	Vargas 36'

Pancho Aréna, Felcsút (Hungary) (Note: Due to the Gaza war, Israel played their remaining home matches at a neutral venue.)
Attendance: 2,024
Referee: Anthony Taylor (England)

18 November 2023
18:00

Belarus	1–0	Andorra
Laptev 83'	Report

Szusza Ferenc Stadion, Budapest (Hungary)
Attendance: 0
Referee: Bulat Sariyev (Kazakhstan)
18 November 2023
20:45

Israel	1–2	Romania
Zahavi 2'	Report	Pușcaș 10'; Hagi 63'

Pancho Aréna, Felcsút (Hungary)
Attendance: 2,921
Referee: François Letexier (France)
18 November 2023
20:45

Switzerland	1–1	Kosovo
Vargas 47'	Report	Hyseni 82'

St. Jakob-Park, Basel
Attendance: 33,000
Referee: António Nobre (Portugal)

21 November 2023
20:45

Andorra	0–2	Israel
	Report	Cervós 29' (o.g.); Kinda 81'

Estadi Nacional, Andorra la Vella
Attendance: 568
Referee: Sascha Stegemann (Germany)
21 November 2023
20:45

Kosovo	0–1	Belarus
	Report	Antilevsky 43'

Stadiumi Fadil Vokrri, Pristina
Attendance: 5,026
Referee: Georgi Kabakov (Bulgaria)
21 November 2023
20:45 (21:45 UTC+2)

Romania	1–0	Switzerland
Alibec 50'	Report

Arena Națională, Bucharest
Attendance: 50,224
Referee: Davide Massa (Italy)

== Goalscorers ==
There were 71 goals scored in 30 matches, for an average of 2.37 goals per match.

6 goals

- (Switzerland national football team) Zeki Amdouni

3 goals

- (Belarus national football team) Max Ebong
- (Kosovo national football team) Vedat Muriqi
- (Kosovo national football team) Milot Rashica
- (Romania national football team) Denis Alibec
- (Romania national football team) Valentin Mihăilă
- (Romania national football team) Nicolae Stanciu
- (Switzerland national football team) Remo Freuler
- (Switzerland national football team) Renato Steffen
- (Switzerland national football team) Ruben Vargas

2 goals

- (Andorra national football team) Albert Rosas
- (Belarus national football team) Dmitry Antilevsky
- (Belarus national football team) Vladislav Morozov
- (Israel national football team) Oscar Gloukh
- (Israel national football team) Shon Weissman
- (Romania national football team) Ianis Hagi
- (Switzerland national football team) Xherdan Shaqiri
- (Switzerland national football team) Granit Xhaka

1 goal

- (Andorra national football team) Márcio Vieira
- (Belarus national football team) Denis Laptev
- (Belarus national football team) Denis Polyakov
- (Israel national football team) Gabi Kanichowsky
- (Israel national football team) Gadi Kinda
- (Israel national football team) Dor Peretz
- (Israel national football team) Raz Shlomo
- (Israel national football team) Manor Solomon
- (Israel national football team) Eran Zahavi
- (Kosovo national football team) Muhamet Hyseni
- (Kosovo national football team) Altin Zeqiri
- (Kosovo national football team) Edon Zhegrova
- (Romania national football team) Andrei Burcă
- (Romania national football team) Florinel Coman
- (Romania national football team) Dennis Man
- (Romania national football team) Răzvan Marin
- (Romania national football team) George Pușcaș
- (Switzerland national football team) Manuel Akanji
- (Switzerland national football team) Cedric Itten
- (Switzerland national football team) Silvan Widmer

1 own goal

- (Andorra national football team) Joan Cervós (against Israel)
- (Israel national football team) Eli Dasa (against Kosovo)

== Discipline ==
A player was automatically suspended for the next match for the following offences:

- Receiving a red card (red card suspensions could be extended for serious offences)
- Receiving three yellow cards in three different matches, as well as after fifth and any subsequent yellow card (yellow card suspensions could be carried forward to the play-offs, but not the finals or any other future international matches)

The following suspensions were served during the qualifying matches:

Team	Player	Offence(s)	Suspended for match(es)
Andorra	Marc Rebés	(yellow card) (yellow-red card) vs Romania (25 March 2023)	vs Kosovo (28 March 2023)
Andorra	Moisés San Nicolás	(yellow card) (yellow-red card) vs Romania (15 October 2023)	vs Belarus (18 November 2023)
Belarus	Max Ebong	(yellow card) vs Switzerland (25 March 2023); (yellow card) vs Romania (28 March 2023); (yellow card) vs Andorra (9 September 2023)	vs Israel (12 September 2023)
Belarus	Sergey Politevich	(yellow card) vs Israel (16 June 2023); (yellow card) vs Andorra (9 September 2023); (yellow card) vs Switzerland (15 October 2023)	vs Andorra (18 November 2023)
Israel	Roy Revivo	(yellow card) (yellow-red card) vs Kosovo (12 November 2023)	vs Switzerland (15 November 2023)
Kosovo	Vedat Muriqi	(yellow card) (yellow-red card) vs Romania (12 September 2023)	vs Andorra (12 October 2023)
Kosovo	Mërgim Vojvoda	(yellow card) vs Switzerland (9 September 2023); (yellow card) vs Romania (12 September 2023); (yellow card) vs Andorra (12 October 2023)	vs Israel (12 November 2023)
Romania	George Pușcaș	(yellow card) vs Kosovo (16 June 2023); (yellow card) vs Israel (9 September 2023); (yellow card) vs Kosovo (12 September 2023)	vs Belarus (12 October 2023)
Romania	Valentin Mihăilă	(red card) vs Israel (18 November 2023)	vs Switzerland (21 November 2023)
Switzerland	Edimilson Fernandes	(red card) vs Israel (15 November 2023)	vs Kosovo (18 November 2023)
