= 2022–23 UEFA Nations League =

Tournament details
- Dates: League phase: 1 June – 27 September 2022; Nations League Finals: 14–18 June 2023; Relegation play-outs: 21–26 March 2024
- Teams: 55 (Note: Although 55 teams entered the competition, only 54 participated, as Russia were disqualified before their first match due to their country's invasion of Ukraine.)

Final positions
- Champions: Spain (1st title)
- Runners-up: Croatia
- Third place: Italy
- Fourth place: Netherlands

Tournament statistics
- Matches played: 162
- Goals scored: 425 (2.62 per match)
- Attendance: 3,225,868 (19,913 per match)
- Top scorer(s): (Norway) Erling Haaland (Serbia) Aleksandar Mitrović (6 goals each)

The 2022–23 UEFA Nations League was the third season of the UEFA Nations League, an international association football competition involving the men's national teams of the 55 member associations of UEFA. The competition was held from June to September 2022 (league phase), June 2023 (Nations League Finals), and March 2024 (relegation play-outs).

Following their win in 2021, defending champions France were unable to defend their title in the finals after finishing third in their group.

Spain won the final against Croatia, 5–4 on penalties following a 0–0 draw after extra time, for their first UEFA Nations League title.

== Format ==
The 55 UEFA national teams were divided into four leagues, with Leagues A, B, and C featuring 16 teams each, divided into four groups of four teams. League D featured seven teams divided into two groups, with one containing four teams and the other containing three. The teams were allocated to leagues based on the 2020–21 UEFA Nations League overall ranking. Each team played six matches within their group, except for one group in League D which played four, using the home-and-away round-robin format in June (four matchdays) and September 2022 (two matchdays).

In the top division, League A, teams competed to become the UEFA Nations League champions. The four group winners of League A qualified for the Nations League Finals in June 2023, which was played in a knockout format, consisting of the semi-finals, third place play-off, and final. The semi-final pairings were determined using a draw. The host country was selected among the four qualified teams by the UEFA Executive Committee, with the winners of the final crowned as the Nations League champions.

Teams also competed for promotion and relegation to a higher or lower league. The group winners in Leagues B, C, and D were promoted, while the last-placed teams of each group in Leagues A and B were relegated. As League C had four groups while League D had only two, the League C team that was to be relegated was determined by relegation play-outs in March 2024.

Originally, the play-outs would have involved all four of the fourth-placed League C teams, with the two losers being relegated to League D. However, due to the ongoing suspension of Russia from all UEFA competitions, the league allocation for the 2024–25 UEFA Nations League was changed so that only one team would be relegated to League D, ensuring that League C would still consist of 16 teams. Based on the Nations League overall ranking of the fourth-placed teams, the two worst-ranked teams qualified for the play-outs.

The tie was played over two legs, with the higher-ranked team hosting the second leg. The team that scored more goals on aggregate over the two legs remained in League C, while the loser was relegated to League D. If the aggregate score was level, extra time was played without the away goals rule. If the score remained level after extra time, a penalty shoot-out was used to decide the winner.

== Tiebreakers ==
=== Tiebreakers for group ranking ===
If two or more teams in the same group were equal on points on completion of the league phase, the following tie-breaking criteria were applied:

1. Higher number of points obtained in the matches played among the teams in question;
2. Superior goal difference in matches played among the teams in question;
3. Higher number of goals scored in the matches played among the teams in question;
4. If, after having applied criteria 1 to 3, teams still had an equal ranking, criteria 1 to 3 were reapplied exclusively to the matches between the teams in question to determine their final rankings. (Note: When there were two or more teams tied in points, criteria 1 to 3 were applied. After these criteria were applied, they may have defined the position of some of the teams involved, but not all of them. For example, if there was a three-way tie on points, the application of the first three criteria may only break the tie for one of the teams, leaving the other two teams still tied. In this case, the tiebreaking procedure was resumed, from the beginning, for those teams that were still tied.) If this procedure did not lead to a decision, criteria 5 to 11 applied;
5. Superior goal difference in all group matches;
6. Higher number of goals scored in all group matches;
7. Higher number of away goals scored in all group matches;
8. Higher number of wins in all group matches;
9. Higher number of away wins in all group matches;
10. Lower disciplinary points total in all group matches (1 point for a single yellow card, 3 points for a red card due to two yellow cards, 3 points for a direct red card, 4 points for a yellow card followed by a direct red card).
11. Position in the 2022–23 UEFA Nations League access list.

=== Criteria for league ranking ===
Individual league rankings were established according to the following criteria:

1. Position in the group;
2. Higher number of points;
3. Superior goal difference;
4. Higher number of goals scored;
5. Higher number of goals scored away from home;
6. Higher number of wins;
7. Higher number of wins away from home;
8. Lower disciplinary points total (1 point for a single yellow card, 3 points for a red card due to two yellow cards, 3 points for a direct red card, 4 points for a yellow card followed by a direct red card).
9. Position in the 2022–23 UEFA Nations League access list.

To rank teams in Leagues B and D, which were composed of different sized groups, (Note: League B was composed of different sized groups as Russia, drawn into Group B2, were disqualified from the competition.) the results against the fourth-placed teams in these leagues were not taken into account when comparing teams placed first, second and third in their respective groups.

The ranking of the top 4 teams in League A was determined by their finish in the Nations League Finals.

=== Criteria for overall ranking ===
The overall UEFA Nations League rankings were established as follows:

1. The 16 League A teams were ranked 1st to 16th according to their league rankings.
2. The 16 League B teams were ranked 17th to 32nd according to their league rankings.
3. The 16 League C teams were ranked 33rd to 48th according to their league rankings.
4. The 7 League D teams were ranked 49th to 55th according to their league rankings.

=== UEFA Euro 2024 qualifying ===
The 2022–23 UEFA Nations League was linked with UEFA Euro 2024 qualifying, providing teams another chance to qualify for UEFA Euro 2024.

The Euro 2024 qualifying group stage took place from March to November 2023, deciding 20 of the 23 teams that advanced to the final tournament to join hosts Germany. The 53 teams were drawn into ten groups after the completion of the UEFA Nations League (seven groups of five teams and three groups of six teams, with the four participants in the 2023 UEFA Nations League Finals guaranteed to be drawn into groups of five teams), with the top two teams in each group qualifying. The draw seeding was based on the overall ranking of the Nations League.

Following the qualifying group stage, the UEFA Euro 2024 qualifying play-offs took place in March 2024. The participants of the play-offs were not decided based on results from the qualifying group stage. Instead, twelve teams were selected based on their performance in the 2022–23 Nations League. These teams were divided into three paths, each containing four teams, with one team from each path qualifying for the final tournament. The group winners of Nations Leagues A, B, and C automatically qualified for the play-off path of their league unless they had already qualified for the final tournament via the qualifying group stage. If a group winner had already qualified through the qualifying group stage, they were replaced by the next best-ranked team in the same league. However, if there were not enough non-qualified teams in the same league, then the spot would go first to the best-ranked group winner of League D unless that team had already qualified for the final tournament. The remaining slots were then allocated to the next best team in the Nations League overall ranking, with the restriction that group winners of Leagues B and C could not face teams from a higher league.

The three play-off paths each featured two single-legged semi-finals and one single-legged final. In the semi-finals, the best-ranked team hosted the fourth-ranked team, and the second-ranked team hosted the third-ranked team. The host of each final was drawn between the winners of the semi-final pairings. The three play-off path winners joined the 20 teams that already qualified for the final tournament via the group stage.

== Schedule ==
The schedule of the 2022–23 UEFA Nations League was as follows. Due to the 2022 FIFA World Cup in Qatar that took place at the end of the year, the league phase was played in June and September 2022.

Stage	Round	Dates
League phase	Matchday 1	1–4 June 2022 (Note: Following the postponement of Path A of UEFA qualifying for the World Cup, UEFA reversed the Group B1 fixtures for matchdays 1 and 2. As part of the change, one fixture (Scotland v Ukraine) corresponding to Group B1's new matchday 1 was moved to 21 September 2022.)
League phase	Matchday 2	5–8 June 2022
League phase	Matchday 3	9–11 June 2022
League phase	Matchday 4	12–14 June 2022
League phase	Matchday 5	22–24 September 2022
League phase	Matchday 6	25–27 September 2022
Finals	Semi-finals	14–15 June 2023
Finals	Third place play-off	18 June 2023
Finals	Final	18 June 2023
Relegation play-outs	First leg	21 March 2024
Relegation play-outs	Second leg	26 March 2024

The fixture list was confirmed by UEFA on 17 December 2021, the day following the draw. The fixture list for groups A4 and B1 were amended due to the postponement of Path A of UEFA qualifying for the World Cup.

The relegation play-outs of League C were scheduled on the same dates as the UEFA Euro 2024 qualifying play-offs. If one or more of the teams due to participate in the relegation play-outs had also qualified for the UEFA Euro 2024 qualifying play-offs, the relegation play-outs would have been cancelled and the lowest-ranked team in League C Nations League overall ranking would have been automatically relegated.

== Seeding ==
Map showing the leagues each national team participated in. League A League B League C League D

All 55 UEFA national teams entered the competition. The teams which finished bottom of their group in Leagues A and B, as well as the losers from the relegation play-outs of League C, from the 2020–21 season moved down a league, while the group winners of Leagues B, C, and D moved up. The remaining teams stayed in their respective leagues.Like the previous season, all teams promoted to a higher tier made their debut appearance at that level.

In the 2022–23 access list, UEFA ranked teams based on the 2020–21 Nations League overall ranking, with a slight modification: teams that were relegated in the previous season were ranked immediately below those who were promoted. The seeding pots for the league phase were based on the access list ranking. The seeding pots, draw procedure, and fixture list procedures were confirmed by the UEFA Executive Committee during their meeting in Chișinău, Moldova, on 22 September 2021.

Key
▲	Promoted after previous season
▼	Relegated after previous season
*	Participated in relegation play-outs

League A
Pot	Team	Prv	Rank
1	France (title holders)		1
1	Spain		2
1	Italy		3
1	Belgium		4
2	Portugal		5
2	Netherlands		6
2	Denmark		7
2	Germany		8
3	England		9
3	Poland		10
3	Switzerland		11
3	Croatia		12
4	Wales	▲	13
4	Austria	▲	14
4	Czech Republic	▲	15
4	Hungary	▲	16

League C
Pot	Team	Prv	Rank
1	Turkey	▼	33
1	Slovakia	▼	34
1	Bulgaria	▼	35
1	Northern Ireland	▼	36
2	Greece		37
2	Belarus		38
2	Luxembourg		39
2	North Macedonia		40
3	Lithuania		41
3	Georgia		42
3	Azerbaijan		43
3	Kosovo		44
4	Kazakhstan (Note: The identity of the winners and losers of the League C relegation play-outs (involving Cyprus, Estonia, Kazakhstan and Moldova) was unknown at the time of the draw.)	*	45
4	Cyprus	*	46
4	Gibraltar	▲	47
4	Faroe Islands	▲	48

League B
Pot	Team	Prv	Rank
1	Ukraine	▼	17
1	Sweden	▼	18
1	Bosnia and Herzegovina	▼	19
1	Iceland	▼	20
2	Finland		21
2	Norway		22
2	Scotland		23
2	Russia		24
3	Israel		25
3	Romania		26
3	Serbia		27
3	Republic of Ireland		28
4	Slovenia	▲	29
4	Montenegro	▲	30
4	Albania	▲	31
4	Armenia	▲	32

League D
Pot	Team	Prv	Rank
1	Estonia	▼*	49
1	Moldova	▼*	50
1	Liechtenstein		51
1	Malta		52
2	Latvia		53
2	San Marino		54
2	Andorra		55

The draw for the league phase took place at the UEFA headquarters in Nyon, Switzerland, on 16 December 2021, 18:00 CET. The draw, originally planned to take place in Montreux, was held behind closed doors due to the COVID-19 pandemic.

As the league phase would be played in June and September 2022, no winter venue restrictions were applied in the draw. Due to the Russian invasion of Ukraine, Russia and Ukraine could not be drawn into the same group. Due to restrictions of excessive travel, Kazakhstan could be paired with only one of Andorra, Malta or Northern Ireland, Armenia, Iceland and Israel could not all be in the same group together and Gibraltar could not be paired with Azerbaijan if they also had two of Andorra, Malta, Kazakhstan or Northern Ireland.

== League A ==
=== Group A1 ===
Pos	Team	Pld	W	D	L	GF	GA	GD	Pts	Qualification or relegation	(Croatia)	(Denmark)	(France)	(Austria)
1	Croatia	6	4	1	1	8	6	+2	13	Qualification for Nations League Finals	—	2–1	1–1	0–3
2	Denmark	6	4	0	2	9	5	+4	12		0–1	—	2–0	2–0
3	France	6	1	2	3	5	7	−2	5		0–1	1–2	—	2–0
4	Austria (R)	6	1	1	4	6	10	−4	4	Relegation to League B	1–3	1–2	1–1	—

Source: UEFA
(R) Relegated

=== Group A2 ===
Pos	Team	Pld	W	D	L	GF	GA	GD	Pts	Qualification or relegation	(Spain)	(Portugal)	(Switzerland)	(Czech Republic)
1	Spain	6	3	2	1	8	5	+3	11	Qualification for Nations League Finals	—	1–1	1–2	2–0
2	Portugal	6	3	1	2	11	3	+8	10		0–1	—	4–0	2–0
3	Switzerland	6	3	0	3	6	9	−3	9		0–1	1–0	—	2–1
4	Czech Republic (R)	6	1	1	4	5	13	−8	4	Relegation to League B	2–2	0–4	2–1	—

Source: UEFA
(R) Relegated

=== Group A3 ===
Pos	Team	Pld	W	D	L	GF	GA	GD	Pts	Qualification or relegation	(Italy)	(Hungary)	(Germany)	(England)
1	Italy	6	3	2	1	8	7	+1	11	Qualification for Nations League Finals	—	2–1	1–1	1–0
2	Hungary	6	3	1	2	8	5	+3	10		0–2	—	1–1	1–0
3	Germany	6	1	4	1	11	9	+2	7		5–2	0–1	—	1–1
4	England (R)	6	0	3	3	4	10	−6	3	Relegation to League B	0–0	0–4	3–3	—

Source: UEFA
(R) Relegated

=== Group A4 ===
Pos	Team	Pld	W	D	L	GF	GA	GD	Pts	Qualification or relegation	(Netherlands)	(Belgium)	(Poland)	(Wales)
1	Netherlands	6	5	1	0	14	6	+8	16	Qualification for Nations League Finals	—	1–0	2–2	3–2
2	Belgium	6	3	1	2	11	8	+3	10		1–4	—	6–1	2–1
3	Poland	6	2	1	3	6	12	−6	7		0–2	0–1	—	2–1
4	Wales (R)	6	0	1	5	6	11	−5	1	Relegation to League B	1–2	1–1	0–1	—

Source: UEFA
(R) Relegated

=== Nations League Finals ===
The four nations from Group A4 (Belgium, the Netherlands, Poland and Wales) bid to host the Nations League Finals. As the nation that qualified for the finals, the Netherlands was granted hosting rights. The semi-final pairings were determined by means of an open draw on 25 January 2023, 11:00 CET, at the UEFA headquarters in Nyon, Switzerland. For scheduling purposes, the host team was allocated to semi-final 1 as the administrative home team.

Times are CEST (UTC+2), as listed by UEFA.

==== Bracket ====
Semi-finals
14 June – Rotterdam
Netherlands	2
Croatia (a.e.t.)	4
15 June – Enschede
Spain	2
Italy	1

Final
18 June – Rotterdam
Croatia	0 (4)
Spain (p)	0 (5)
Third place play-off
18 June – Enschede
Netherlands	2
Italy	3

==== Semi-finals ====
14 June 2023
20:45

Netherlands	2–4 (a.e.t.)	Croatia
Malen 34'; Lang 90+6'	Report	Kramarić 55' (pen.); Pašalić 72'; Petković 98'; Modrić 116' (pen.)

De Kuip, Rotterdam
Attendance: 39,359
Referee: István Kovács (Romania)

15 June 2023
20:45

Spain	2–1	Italy
Pino 3'; Joselu 88'	Report	Immobile 11' (pen.)

De Grolsch Veste, Enschede
Attendance: 24,558
Referee: Slavko Vinčić (Slovenia)

==== Third-place play-off ====
18 June 2023
15:00

Netherlands	2–3	Italy
Bergwijn 68'; Wijnaldum 89'	Report	Dimarco 6'; Frattesi 20'; Chiesa 72'

De Grolsch Veste, Enschede
Attendance: 21,292
Referee: Glenn Nyberg (Sweden)

==== Final ====
18 June 2023
20:45

Croatia	0–0 (a.e.t.)	Spain
	Report
Penalties
Vlašić (penalty scored); Brozović (penalty scored); Modrić (penalty scored); Majer (penalty missed); Perišić (penalty scored); Petković (penalty missed)	4–5	(penalty scored) Joselu; (penalty scored) Rodri; (penalty scored) Merino; (penalty scored) Asensio; (penalty missed) Laporte; (penalty scored) Carvajal

De Kuip, Rotterdam
Attendance: 41,110
Referee: Felix Zwayer (Germany)

=== Top goalscorers ===
There were 140 goals scored in 52 matches, for an average of 2.69 goals per match.

League A top goalscorers
Rank	Player	Goals
1	(Belgium national football team) Michy Batshuayi	3
1	(Croatia national football team) Luka Modrić	3
1	(Netherlands national football team) Steven Bergwijn	3
1	(Netherlands national football team) Memphis Depay	3
5	30 players	2

== League B ==
=== Group B1 ===
Pos	Team	Pld	W	D	L	GF	GA	GD	Pts	Promotion or relegation	(Scotland)	(Ukraine)	(Republic of Ireland)	(Armenia)
1	Scotland (P)	6	4	1	1	11	5	+6	13	Promotion to League A	—	3–0	2–1	2–0
2	Ukraine	6	3	2	1	10	4	+6	11		0–0	—	1–1	3–0
3	Republic of Ireland	6	2	1	3	8	7	+1	7		3–0	0–1	—	3–2
4	Armenia (R)	6	1	0	5	4	17	−13	3	Relegation to League C	1–4	0–5	1–0	—

Source: UEFA
(P) Promoted; (R) Relegated

=== Group B2 ===
Pos	Team	Pld	W	D	L	GF	GA	GD	Pts	Promotion or relegation	(Israel)	(Iceland)	(Albania)	(Russia)
1	Israel (P)	4	2	2	0	8	6	+2	8	Promotion to League A	—	2–2	2–1	Canc.
2	Iceland	4	0	4	0	6	6	0	4		2–2	—	1–1	Canc.
3	Albania	4	0	2	2	4	6	−2	2		1–2	1–1	—	Canc.
4	Russia (Note: On 2 May 2022, UEFA announced that Russia were suspended and automatically relegated to League C due to their country's invasion of Ukraine.) (D)	0	0	0	0	0	0	0	0	Banned from tournament	Canc.	Canc.	Canc.	—

Source: UEFA
(D) Disqualified; (P) Promoted

=== Group B3 ===
Pos	Team	Pld	W	D	L	GF	GA	GD	Pts	Promotion or relegation	(Bosnia and Herzegovina)	(Finland)	(Montenegro)	(Romania)
1	Bosnia and Herzegovina (P)	6	3	2	1	8	8	0	11	Promotion to League A	—	3–2	1–0	1–0
2	Finland	6	2	2	2	8	6	+2	8		1–1	—	2–0	1–1
3	Montenegro	6	2	1	3	6	6	0	7 (Note: Head-to-head points: Montenegro 6, Romania 0.)		1–1	0–2	—	2–0
4	Romania (R)	6	2	1	3	6	8	−2	7	Relegation to League C	4–1	1–0	0–3	—

Source: UEFA
(P) Promoted; (R) Relegated

=== Group B4 ===
Pos	Team	Pld	W	D	L	GF	GA	GD	Pts	Promotion or relegation	(Serbia)	(Norway)	(Slovenia)	(Sweden)
1	Serbia (P)	6	4	1	1	13	5	+8	13	Promotion to League A	—	0–1	4–1	4–1
2	Norway	6	3	1	2	7	7	0	10		0–2	—	0–0	3–2
3	Slovenia	6	1	3	2	6	10	−4	6		2–2	2–1	—	0–2
4	Sweden (R)	6	1	1	4	7	11	−4	4	Relegation to League C	0–1	1–2	1–1	—

Source: UEFA
(P) Promoted; (R) Relegated

=== Top goalscorer ===
There were 112 goals scored in 42 matches, for an average of 2.67 goals per match.

League B top goalscorers
Rank	Player	Goals
1	(Norway national football team) Erling Haaland	6
1	(Serbia national football team) Aleksandar Mitrović	6
3	(Montenegro national football team) Stefan Mugoša	4
4	(Bosnia and Herzegovina national football team) Edin Džeko	3
4	(Finland national football team) Teemu Pukki	3
4	(Slovenia national football team) Benjamin Šeško	3
4	(Sweden men's national football team) Emil Forsberg	3
4	(Ukraine national football team) Artem Dovbyk	3
9	15 players	2

== League C ==
=== Group C1 ===
Pos	Team	Pld	W	D	L	GF	GA	GD	Pts	Promotion or qualification	(Turkey)	(Luxembourg)	(Faroe Islands)	(Lithuania)
1	Turkey (P)	6	4	1	1	18	5	+13	13	Promotion to League B	—	3–3	4–0	2–0
2	Luxembourg	6	3	2	1	9	7	+2	11		0–2	—	2–2	1–0
3	Faroe Islands	6	2	2	2	7	10	−3	8		2–1	0–1	—	2–1
4	Lithuania (O)	6	0	1	5	2	14	−12	1	Qualification for relegation play-outs	0–6	0–2	1–1	—

Source: UEFA
(O) Play-off winners; (P) Promoted

=== Group C2 ===
Pos	Team	Pld	W	D	L	GF	GA	GD	Pts	Promotion	(Greece)	(Kosovo)	(Northern Ireland)	(Cyprus)
1	Greece (P)	6	5	0	1	10	2	+8	15	Promotion to League B	—	2–0	3–1	3–0
2	Kosovo	6	3	0	3	11	8	+3	9		0–1	—	3–2	5–1
3	Northern Ireland	6	1	2	3	7	10	−3	5 (Note: Tied on head-to-head results. Overall goal difference was used as the tiebreaker.)		0–1	2–1	—	2–2
4	Cyprus	6	1	2	3	4	12	−8	5	Spared from relegation play-outs	1–0	0–2	0–0	—

Source: UEFA
(P) Promoted

=== Group C3 ===
Pos	Team	Pld	W	D	L	GF	GA	GD	Pts	Promotion	(Kazakhstan)	(Azerbaijan)	(Slovakia)	(Belarus)
1	Kazakhstan (P)	6	4	1	1	8	6	+2	13	Promotion to League B	—	2–0	2–1	2–1
2	Azerbaijan	6	3	1	2	7	4	+3	10		3–0	—	0–1	2–0
3	Slovakia	6	2	1	3	5	6	−1	7		0–1	1–2	—	1–1
4	Belarus	6	0	3	3	3	7	−4	3	Spared from relegation play-outs	1–1	0–0	0–1	—

Source: UEFA
(P) Promoted

=== Group C4 ===
Pos	Team	Pld	W	D	L	GF	GA	GD	Pts	Promotion or qualification	(Georgia (country))	(Bulgaria)	(North Macedonia)	(Gibraltar)
1	Georgia (P)	6	5	1	0	16	3	+13	16	Promotion to League B	—	0–0	2–0	4–0
2	Bulgaria	6	2	3	1	10	8	+2	9		2–5	—	1–1	5–1
3	North Macedonia	6	2	1	3	7	7	0	7		0–3	0–1	—	4–0
4	Gibraltar (R)	6	0	1	5	3	18	−15	1	Qualification for relegation play-outs	1–2	1–1	0–2	—

Source: UEFA
(P) Promoted; (R) Relegated

=== Ranking of fourth-placed teams ===
Pos	Grp	Team	Pld	W	D	L	GF	GA	GD	Pts	Qualification
1	C2	Cyprus	6	1	2	3	4	12	−8	5	Spared from relegation play-outs
2	C3	Belarus	6	0	3	3	3	7	−4	3	Spared from relegation play-outs
3	C1	Lithuania (O)	6	0	1	5	2	14	−12	1	Qualification for relegation play-outs
4	C4	Gibraltar (R)	6	0	1	5	3	18	−15	1	Qualification for relegation play-outs

Source: UEFA
Rules for classification: Ranking criteria
(O) Play-off winners; (R) Relegated

=== Relegation play-outs ===
The League C relegation play-outs took place on 21 and 26 March 2024, after UEFA decided that Russia would be excluded from the Nations League due to the country's continued war against Ukraine: therefore, only one team (Gibraltar) was relegated from League C and two teams (Estonia and Latvia) were promoted from League D, so that the 2024–25 League C season would still have 16 teams.

Team 1	Agg.	Team 2	1st leg	2nd leg
Gibraltar	0–2	Lithuania	0–1	0–1

=== Top goalscorers ===
There were 129 goals scored in 50 matches, for an average of 2.58 goals per match.

League C top goalscorers
Rank	Player	Goals
1	(Georgia national football team) Khvicha Kvaratskhelia	5
1	(Kosovo national football team) Vedat Muriqi	5
3	(Luxembourg national football team) Gerson Rodrigues	4
3	(Turkey national football team) Serdar Dursun	4
5	(Bulgaria national football team) Kiril Despodov	3
5	(Greece national football team) Anastasios Bakasetas	3
5	(Kazakhstan national football team) Abat Aymbetov	3
5	(Luxembourg national football team) Danel Sinani	3
9	15 players	2

== League D ==
=== Group D1 ===
Pos	Team	Pld	W	D	L	GF	GA	GD	Pts	Promotion	(Latvia)	(Moldova)	(Andorra)	(Liechtenstein)
1	Latvia (P)	6	4	1	1	12	5	+7	13 (Note: Tied on head-to-head points (3). Head-to-head goal difference: Latvia +1, Moldova −1.)	Promotion to League C	—	1–2	3–0	1–0
2	Moldova	6	4	1	1	10	6	+4	13		2–4	—	2–1	2–0
3	Andorra	6	2	2	2	6	7	−1	8		1–1	0–0	—	2–1
4	Liechtenstein	6	0	0	6	1	11	−10	0		0–2	0–2	0–2	—

Source: UEFA
(P) Promoted

=== Group D2 ===
Pos	Team	Pld	W	D	L	GF	GA	GD	Pts	Promotion	(Estonia)	(Malta)	(San Marino)
1	Estonia (P)	4	4	0	0	10	2	+8	12	Promotion to League C	—	2–1	2–0
2	Malta	4	2	0	2	5	4	+1	6		1–2	—	1–0
3	San Marino	4	0	0	4	0	9	−9	0		0–4	0–2	—

Source: UEFA
(P) Promoted

=== Top goalscorers ===
There were 44 goals scored in 18 matches, for an average of 2.44 goals per match.

League D top goalscorers
Rank	Player	Goals
1	(Latvia national football team) Vladislavs Gutkovskis	5
2	(Estonia national football team) Henri Anier	4
2	(Latvia national football team) Jānis Ikaunieks	4
2	(Moldova national football team) Ion Nicolaescu	4
5	(Andorra national football team) Albert Rosas	2
5	(Estonia national football team) Rauno Sappinen	2
5	(Latvia national football team) Roberts Uldriķis	2
5	(Moldova national football team) Victor Stînă	2
9	18 players	1

== Overall ranking ==
The results of each team were used to calculate the overall ranking of the competition, which was used for seeding in the UEFA Euro 2024 qualifying group stage draw.

League A
League B

Rnk	Team	Pld	Pts
1	Spain	6	11
2	Croatia	6	13
3	Italy	6	11
4	Netherlands	6	16
5	Denmark	6	12
6	Portugal	6	10
7	Belgium	6	10
8	Hungary	6	10
9	Switzerland	6	9
10	Germany	6	7
11	Poland	6	7
12	France	6	5
13	Austria	6	4
14	Czech Republic	6	4
15	England	6	3
16	Wales	6	1

Source: UEFA

Rnk	Team	Pld	Pts
17	Israel	4	8
18	Bosnia and Herzegovina	4	8
19	Serbia	4	7
20	Scotland	4	7
21	Finland	4	7
22	Ukraine	4	5
23	Iceland	4	4
24	Norway	4	4
25	Slovenia	4	5
26	Republic of Ireland	4	4
27	Albania	4	2
28	Montenegro	4	1
29	Romania	6	7
30	Sweden	6	4
31	Armenia	6	3
32	Russia	0	0

Source: UEFA
League C
League D

Rnk	Team	Pld	Pts
33	Georgia	6	16
34	Greece	6	15
35	Turkey	6	13
36	Kazakhstan	6	13
37	Luxembourg	6	11
38	Azerbaijan	6	10
39	Kosovo	6	9
40	Bulgaria	6	9
41	Faroe Islands	6	8
42	North Macedonia	6	7
43	Slovakia	6	7
44	Northern Ireland	6	5
45	Cyprus	6	5
46	Belarus	6	3
47	Lithuania	6	1
48	Gibraltar	6	1

Source: UEFA

Rnk	Team	Pld	Pts
49	Estonia	4	12
50	Latvia	4	7
51	Moldova	4	7
52	Malta	4	6
53	Andorra	4	2
54	San Marino	4	0
55	Liechtenstein	6	0

Source: UEFA

== Euro 2024 qualifying play-offs ==
Teams who were unsuccessful in the UEFA Euro 2024 qualifying group stage could still qualify for the final tournament via the play-offs. Leagues A, B, and C in the UEFA Nations League were each allocated one of the three remaining UEFA Euro 2024 places. Four teams who did not already qualify for the European Championship finals competed in the play-offs for each of those leagues, with the matches taking place in March 2024.

The team selection process, using a set of criteria, determined the twelve teams that would compete in the play-offs based on the Nations League overall rankings.

League A
Rank	Team
1 ^{GW}	Spain
2 ^{GW}	Croatia
3 ^{GW}	Italy
4 ^{GW}	Netherlands
5	Denmark
6	Portugal
7	Belgium
8	Hungary
9	Switzerland
10	Germany ^{†}
11	Poland
12	France
13	Austria
14	Czech Republic
15	England
16	Wales

League B
Rank	Team
17 ^{GW}	Israel
18 ^{GW}	Bosnia and Herzegovina
19 ^{GW}	Serbia
20 ^{GW}	Scotland
21	Finland
22	Ukraine
23	Iceland
24	Norway
25	Slovenia
26	Republic of Ireland
27	Albania
28	Montenegro
29	Romania
30	Sweden
31	Armenia
32	Russia ^{‡}

League C
Rank	Team
33 ^{GW}	Georgia
34 ^{GW}	Greece
35 ^{GW}	Turkey
36 ^{GW}	Kazakhstan
37	Luxembourg
38	Azerbaijan
39	Kosovo
40	Bulgaria
41	Faroe Islands
42	North Macedonia
43	Slovakia
44	Northern Ireland
45	Cyprus
46	Belarus
47	Lithuania
48	Gibraltar

League D
Rank	Team
49 ^{BD}	Estonia
50	Latvia
51	Moldova
52	Malta
53	Andorra
54	San Marino
55	Liechtenstein

Key

- ^{GW} Group winner from Nations League A, B or C
- ^{BD} Best group winner from Nations League D
- Team in bold advanced to play-offs
- Team qualified directly to final tournament
- † UEFA Euro 2024 host, qualified automatically
- ‡ Banned from qualifying competition
