= Vladislav Morozov =

Belarusian footballer (born 2000)

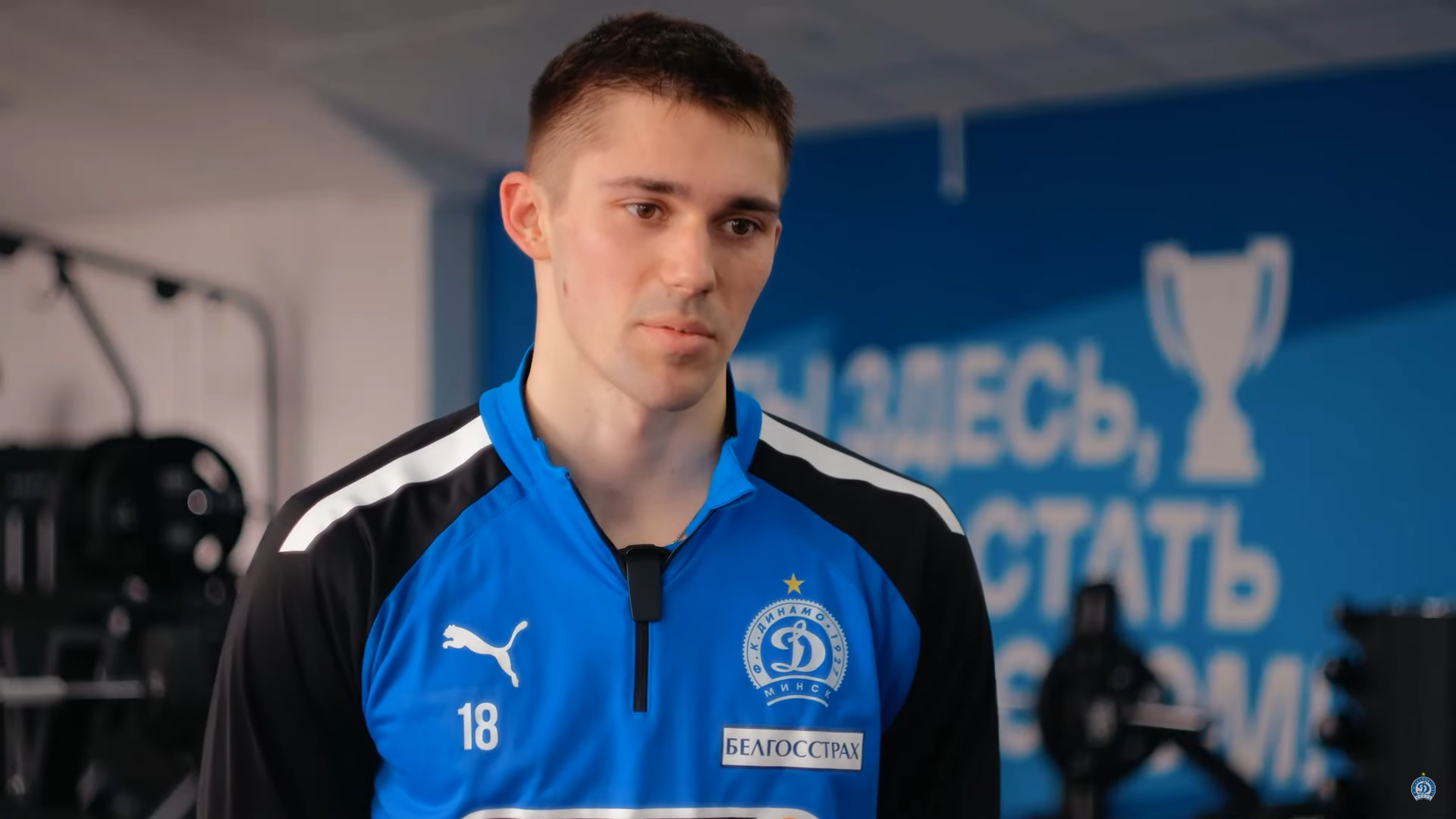
- Morozov with Dinamo Minsk in 2023

Personal information
- Full name: Vladislav Vladimirovich Morozov
- Date of birth: 12 October 2000 (age 26)
- Place of birth: Brest, Belarus
- Height: 1.88 m (6 ft 2 in)
- Position: Forward

Team information
- Current team: Kolding
- Number: 18

Youth career
- 2016–2018: Dinamo Brest

Senior career*
Years	Team	Apps	(Gls)
2018–2020	Rukh Brest	38	(10)
2021–2022	Isloch Minsk Raion	54	(11)
2023–2024	Dinamo Minsk	28	(16)
2024–2026	Arouca	15	(0)
2025	→ Paços de Ferreira (loan)	19	(3)
2025–2026	→ Kolding (loan)	21	(10)
2026–	Kolding	2	(0)

International career^{‡}
2019–2022	Belarus U21	11	(3)
2023–	Belarus	16	(3)
- * Club domestic league appearances and goals as of 18:36, 4 October 2026 (UTC) ‡ National team caps and goals as of 5 June 2026

Vladislav Vladimirovich Morozov (Belarusian: Уладзіслаў Уладзіміравіч Марозаў; Russian: Владислав Владимирович Морозов; born 12 October 2000) is a Belarusian professional footballer who plays as a forward for Danish 1st Division club Kolding IF and the Belarus national team. He has also represented Belarus U21.

== Club career ==
On 29 January 2024, Morozov signed a three-and-a-half-year contract with Portuguese Primeira Liga club Arouca, with his release clause set at €10 million. He arrived from Dinamo Minsk, having finished as the Belarusian Premier League's leading scorer with 18 goals the previous season, but made little impact in Portugal, playing 15 times across two seasons, mostly as a substitute, without scoring.

On 7 January 2025, Morozov joined Paços de Ferreira of Liga Portugal 2 on loan for the remainder of the season, without an option to buy. He scored three goals in 19 appearances for the second-tier club.

On 1 September 2025, the closing day of the transfer window, Morozov was loaned to Danish 1st Division club Kolding IF until the end of the season. He scored 10 goals in 21 league matches to finish as the club's leading scorer, and returned to Arouca when the loan expired on 30 June 2026. On 21 August 2026, Kolding signed him on a permanent basis, on a contract running to the summer of 2029.

== International goals ==
Scores and results list Belarus' goal tally first.

No	Date	Venue	Opponent	Score	Result	Competition
1.	28 March 2023	Arena Națională, Bucharest, Romania	Romania	1–2	1–2	Euro 2024 qualifier
2.	19 June 2023	Szusza Ferenc Stadion, Újpest, Hungary	Kosovo	1–0	2–1	Euro 2024 qualifier
3.	5 June 2026	National Football Stadium, Minsk, Belarus	Syria	1–0	4–1	Friendly

== Honours ==
Dinamo Minsk

- Belarusian Premier League: 2023
