= Ioan-Călin Revenco =

Moldovan footballer

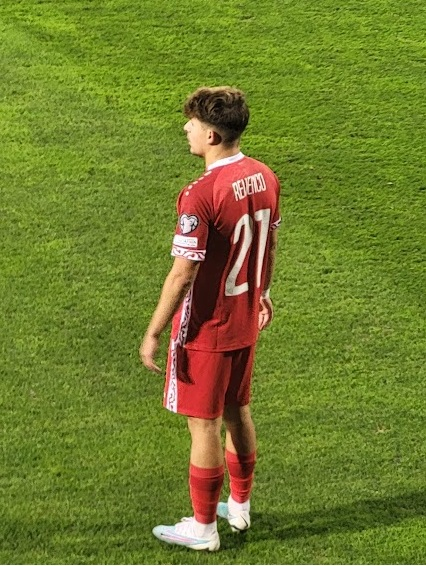
- Revenco with Moldova in 2023

Personal information
- Date of birth: 26 June 2000 (age 26)
- Place of birth: Chișinău, Moldova
- Height: 1.76 m (5 ft 9 in)
- Position: Defender

Team information
- Current team: Petrocub Hîncești
- Number: 21

Youth career
- CSCT Buiucani
- –2017: Dacia Chișinău

Senior career*
Years	Team	Apps	(Gls)
2018–2019	Spartaks Jūrmala	0	(0)
2019–2021	Dacia Buiucani	32	(3)
2021–2023	Petrocub Hîncești	59	(2)
2024–2025	Puszcza Niepołomice	29	(0)
2025–2026	Tatran Prešov	22	(0)
2026–	Petrocub Hîncești	0	(0)

International career^{‡}
2016	Moldova U17	3	(0)
2018	Moldova U19	3	(0)
2020–2021	Moldova U21	7	(0)
2021–	Moldova	34	(1)
- * Club domestic league appearances and goals as of 11:50, 17 May 2026 (UTC) ‡ National team caps and goals as of 17 November 2026

Ioan-Călin Revenco (born 26 June 2000) is a Moldovan professional footballer who plays as a defender for Moldovan Liga club Petrocub Hîncești and the Moldova national team.

== Club career ==
A youth product of the Moldovan club Dacia Chișinău, Revenco moved to Latvia with the club Spartaks Jūrmala. He made his senior debut with Spartaks Jūrmala in a 3–0 UEFA Europa League win over La Fiorita on 2 August 2018. He returned to Moldova with Dacia Buiucani, and made his professional debut with them in a 1–0 Moldovan National Division win over Zimbru on 5 July 2020. On 22 December 2023, Revenco signed a one-year-and-a-half contract with Ekstraklasa club Puszcza Niepołomice, with an option to extend.

== International career ==
Revenco made his debut for Moldova in a 2–0 2022 FIFA World Cup qualification loss to Scotland on 12 November 2021. His first goal for the senior team came on 22 September 2022, scoring in the 26th minute of a 1–2 away win over Latvia.

== Career statistics ==
=== International ===
As of match played 16 November 2026

Appearances and goals by national team and year
National team	Year	Apps	Goals
Moldova
Moldova	2021	2	0
Moldova	2022	11	1
Moldova	2023	10	0
Moldova	2024	1	0
Moldova	2025	2	0
Moldova	2026	8	0
Total		34	1

Scores and results list Moldova's goal tally first, score column indicates score after each Revenco goal.

List of international goals scored by Ioan-Călin Revenco
No	Date	Venue	Opponent	Score	Result	Competition
1	22 September 2022	Skonto Stadium, Riga, Latvia	Latvia	1–0	1–2	2022–23 UEFA Nations League
