= Jesús Rubio (footballer, born 1994) =

Andorran footballer (born 1994)

Personal information
- Full name: Jesús Rubio Gómez
- Date of birth: 9 September 1994 (age 32)
- Place of birth: Escaldes–Engordany, Andorra
- Height: 1.68 m (5 ft 6 in)
- Position: Midfielder

Team information
- Current team: Atlètic d'Escaldes

Youth career
- FC Andorra

Senior career*
Years	Team	Apps	(Gls)
2013–2014	FC Andorra		
2014–2017	UE Santa Coloma	59	(4)
2017–2018	FC Andorra	28	(0)
2018–2019	UE Santa Coloma	26	(2)
2019–2020	FC Santa Coloma	19	(1)
2020–2021	Atlètic d'Escaldes	6	(0)
2021–2024	Inter d'Escaldes	58	(2)
2024–2025	UE Santa Coloma	15	(0)
2025–2026	FC Santa Coloma	12	(2)
2026–	Atlètic d'Escaldes	0	(0)

International career^{‡}
2010	Andorra U17	7	(0)
2011–2012	Andorra U19	5	(0)
2013–2016	Andorra U21	17	(0)
2015–	Andorra	54	(1)
- * Club domestic league appearances and goals as of 16 May 2026 ‡ National team caps and goals as of 4 June 2026

Jesús Rubio Gómez, known as Jesús Rubio, Chus Rubio or Txus Rubio (born 9 September 1994), is an Andorran professional footballer. He plays for Atlètic Club d'Escaldes and the Andorra national football team.

== International ==
He made his debut for the Andorra national football team on 12 November 2015 in a friendly game against Saint Kitts and Nevis. On June 10, 2022, he scored his first goal with the national team against Liechtenstein, a spectacular goal with a 60-meter lob. Thanks to this goal, the second for Andorra in this match, the Pyrenean team beat Liechtenstein at home (2–1), this game was part of the 2022–23 UEFA Nations League.

=== International goals ===
Scores and results list Andorra's goal tally first.

No.	Date	Venue	Opponent	Score	Result	Competition
1.	10 June 2022	Estadi Nacional, Andorra la Vella, Andorra	Liechtenstein	2–0	2–1	2022–23 UEFA Nations League D
