= Altin Zeqiri =

Kosovar-Finnish footballer (born 2000)

Personal information
- Date of birth: 18 July 2000 (age 26)
- Place of birth: Espoo, Finland
- Height: 1.85 m (6 ft 1 in)
- Position: Winger

Team information
- Current team: Esenler Erokspor
- Number: 88

Youth career
- EBK
- –2016: Honka
- 2016–2018: Espoo

Senior career*
Years	Team	Apps	(Gls)
2017–2019	Espoo	30	(11)
2019–2023	Lahti	87	(18)
2023–2026	Çaykur Rizespor	85	(9)
2026–	Esenler Erokspor	9	(1)

International career^{‡}
2021–2022	Kosovo U21	11	(0)
2023–	Kosovo	3	(1)
- * Club domestic league appearances and goals as of 19 October 2026 ‡ National team caps and goals as of 21 November 2023

Altin Zeqiri (born 18 July 2000) is a professional footballer who plays as a winger for Turkish TFF 1. Lig club Esenler Erokspor. Born in Finland, he plays for the Kosovo national team.

== Early life ==
Born in Espoo, Finland, Zeqiri started to play football in the youth sectors of local clubs EBK, FC Honka and FC Espoo.

== Club career ==
Zeqiri started his senior career in 2017 with FC Espoo, playing in the third-tier Kakkonen.

=== Lahti ===
On 23 July 2019, Zeqiri signed a two-year contract with Veikkausliiga club Lahti and received squad number 24. Eighteen days later, he made his debut in a 4–0 away defeat against HJK after coming on as a substitute at 85th minute in place of Josu. On 5 October 2021, he extended his contract with Lahti until the end of the 2023 season.

=== Çaykur Rizespor ===
On 9 August 2023, Zeqiri was acquired by Turkish club Çaykur Rizespor on a three-year deal, with an option for an additional year, for an undisclosed fee. He debuted in Süper Lig on 13 August 2023, after being named in the starting line up in a 2–1 away loss against Adana Demirspor, playing full 90 minutes in the match. Zeqiri scored his first goal in the league on 21 October 2023, in a 3–1 away loss against Kayserispor.

== International career ==
On 15 March 2021, Zeqiri received a call-up from Kosovo U21 for the friendly matches against Qatar U23. Eleven days later, he made his debut with Kosovo U21 in first match against Qatar U23 after being named in the starting line-up.

In August 2023, Zeqiri received his first call-up to the Kosovo senior national team by head coach Primož Gliha, for two UEFA Euro 2024 qualifying matches against Switzerland and Romania. He scored a goal in his full international debut for Kosovo on 12 October 2023, in a 0–3 away win against Andorra.

== Personal life ==
Zeqiri is a devout Muslim and he fasts during Ramadan.

== Career statistics ==
=== Club ===
As of 31 May 2025

Appearances and goals by club, season and competition
Club	Season	League			National cup (Note: Includes Suomen Cup and Turkish Cup)		League cup (Note: Includes Kakkonen Cup and Finnish League Cup)		Europe		Total	
Club	Season	Division	Apps	Goals	Apps	Goals	Apps	Goals	Apps	Goals	Apps	Goals
Espoo	2017	Kakkonen	2	3	0	0	—		—		2	3
Espoo	2018	Kakkonen	18	3	0	0	—		—		18	3
Espoo	2019	Kakkonen	10	5	0	0	3	0	—		13	5
Espoo	Total		30	11	0	0	3	0	0	0	33	11
Lahti	2019	Veikkausliiga	7	1	0	0	—		—		7	1
Lahti	2020	Veikkausliiga	20	2	3	1	—		—		23	3
Lahti	2021	Veikkausliiga	18	7	3	0	—		—		21	7
Lahti	2022	Veikkausliiga	27	4	5	0	2	3	—		34	7
Lahti	2023	Veikkausliiga	15	4	3	1	5	3	—		23	8
Lahti	Total		87	18	14	2	7	6	0	0	108	26
Çaykur Rizespor	2023–24	Süper Lig	35	5	1	0	—		—		36	5
Çaykur Rizespor	2024–25	Süper Lig	27	3	5	3	—		—		32	6
Çaykur Rizespor	Total		62	8	6	3	0	0	0	0	68	11
Career total			179	37	20	5	10	6	0	0	209	48

=== International ===
As of match played on 18 November 2023

National team	Year	Competitive		Friendly		Total	
National team	Year	Apps	Goals	Apps	Goals	Apps	Goals
Kosovo	2023	3 (Note: Appearances in the UEFA Euro 2024 qualification.)	1	0	0	3	1
Total		3	1	0	0	3	1

Scores and results list Kosovo's goal tally first, score column indicates score after each Zeqiri goal.

List of international goals scored by Altin Zeqiri
No.	Date	Venue	Opponent	Score	Result	Competition
1	12 October 2023	Estadi Nacional, Andorra la Vella, Andorra	Andorra	3–0	3–0	UEFA Euro 2024 qualification
