= Livio Meier =

Liechtenstein footballer

Personal information
- Full name: Livio Meier
- Date of birth: 10 January 1998 (age 28)
- Place of birth: Vaduz, Liechtenstein
- Position: Midfielder

Team information
- Current team: USV Eschen/Mauren
- Number: 23

Youth career
- 2007–2012: USV Eschen/Mauren
- 2012–2015: FC St. Gallen
- 2015–2016: FC Vaduz

Senior career*
Years	Team	Apps	(Gls)
2016–2018	FC Balzers	39	(4)
2018–	USV Eschen/Mauren	166	(9)

International career^{‡}
2010–2014	Liechtenstein U17	12	(0)
2014–2016	Liechtenstein U19	8	(0)
2015–2020	Liechtenstein U21	17	(0)
2017–	Liechtenstein	65	(1)
- * Club domestic league appearances and goals as of 6 June 2026 ‡ National team caps and goals as of 16 November 2026

Livio Meier (born 10 January 1998) is a Liechtensteiner footballer who currently plays for USV Eschen/Mauren.

== International career ==
He is a member of the Liechtenstein national football team, making his debut in a friendly match against Qatar on 14 December 2017. Meier also made 17 appearances for the Liechtenstein U21 between 2015 and 2020.

=== International goals ===
Scores and results list Liechtenstein's goal tally first.

No.	Date	Venue	Opponent	Score	Result	Competition
1.	10 June 2022	Estadi Nacional, Andorra la Vella, Andorra	Andorra	1–2	1–2	2022–23 UEFA Nations League D
