= Albert Rosas =

Andorran footballer

Personal information
- Full name: Albert Rosas Ubach
- Date of birth: 19 August 2002 (age 24)
- Place of birth: Andorra la Vella, Andorra
- Height: 1.79 m (5 ft 10 in)
- Position: Forward

Team information
- Current team: Logroñés (on loan from Andorra)
- Number: 9

Youth career
- 2017–2021: FC Andorra
- 2020–2021: → Lleida Esportiu (loan)

Senior career*
Years	Team	Apps	(Gls)
2021–	FC Andorra	5	(0)
2021–2022	→ Atlético Monzón (loan)	27	(16)
2022–2023	→ Utebo (loan)	16	(10)
2023–2024	→ Betis B (loan)	29	(2)
2025	→ Atlético Baleares (loan)	12	(3)
2025–	→ Logroñés (loan)	28	(16)

International career^{‡}
2018	Andorra U17	3	(1)
2019	Andorra U19	2	(0)
2019–2024	Andorra U21	20	(4)
2021–	Andorra	31	(6)
- * Club domestic league appearances and goals as of 7 May 2026 ‡ National team caps and goals as of 13 November 2026

Albert Rosas Ubach (born 19 August 2002), sometimes known as Berto, is an Andorran professional footballer who plays as a forward for Spanish club UD Logroñés, on loan from FC Andorra, and the Andorra national team.

== Career ==
A youth product of FC Andorra and Lleida Esportiu, Rosas made his senior debut with Atlético Monzón, being loaned to the club on 2 August 2021. On 1 August 2022, after scoring 16 goals for Monzón during the 2021–22 Tercera División RFEF, he renewed with Andorra until 2025 and was loaned to Segunda Federación side Utebo FC.

On 31 January 2023, after scoring 11 goals overall for Utebo, Rosas was loaned to Real Betis' reserves, also in the fourth tier. His loan with the latter was extended for a further year on 26 June, and he finished the 2023–24 season with 17 appearances overall as the club achieved promotion to Primera Federación.

Upon returning, Rosas was assigned to Andorra's first team now also in the third division, but was rarely used and left on loan to CD Atlético Baleares back in the fourth tier on 30 January 2025; he also agreed to a contract extension with his parent club until 2027. On 11 August, he joined fellow league team UD Logroñés also in a temporary deal.

After helping Logroñés to achieve promotion to division three, Rosas' loan was extended for a further year on 23 July 2026, with his contract with Andorra being extended until 2028.

== International career ==
Rosas debuted with the Andorra national team in a 4–1 2022 FIFA World Cup qualification loss to Poland on 12 November 2021.

== Career statistics ==
=== International ===
Stats correct as of 13 November 2026

No.	Date	Venue	Opponent	Score	Result	Competition
1	22 September 2022	Rheinpark Stadion, Vaduz, Liechtenstein	Liechtenstein	1–0	2–0	2022–23 UEFA Nations League D
2	25 September 2022	Estadi Nacional, Andorra la Vella, Andorra	Latvia	1–1	1–1	2022–23 UEFA Nations League D
3	28 March 2023	Fadil Vokrri Stadium, Pristina, Kosovo	Kosovo	1–1	1–1	UEFA Euro 2024 qualifying
4	19 June 2023	Teddy Stadium, Jerusalem, Israel	Israel	1–1	1–2	UEFA Euro 2024 qualifying
5	13 October 2024	Estadi Nacional, Andorra la Vella, Andorra	San Marino	1–0	2–0	Friendly
6	13 November 2026	Estadi de la FAF, Encamp, Andorra	Gibraltar	2–0	2–0	2026–27 UEFA Nations League D
