= Victor Stînă =

Moldovan footballer

Personal information
- Date of birth: 20 March 1998 (age 28)
- Place of birth: Gura Galbenei, Moldova
- Height: 1.68 m (5 ft 6 in)
- Position: Attacking midfielder

Team information
- Current team: Kapaz
- Number: 11

Senior career*
Years	Team	Apps	(Gls)
2013–2015	Sfîntul Gheorghe	24	(0)
2015–2017	Zimbru-2 Chișinău	56	(12)
2016–2018	Zimbru Chișinău	52	(8)
2018–2019	Astra Giurgiu	0	(0)
2019	→ Milsami Orhei (loan)	21	(3)
2020–2021	Sfîntul Gheorghe	50	(15)
2022–2024	Panserraikos	37	(5)
2024–2025	AEL	31	(8)
2025	Zimbru Chișinău	7	(2)
2025–2026	Bnei Yehuda Tel Aviv	28	(3)
2026	Zimbru Chișinău	2	(1)
2026–	Kapaz	9	(2)

International career^{‡}
2016	Moldova U19 (Note: Only official UEFA matches included)	2	(0)
2017–2020	Moldova U21	12	(0)
2022–	Moldova	35	(4)
- * Club domestic league appearances and goals as of 2 November 2026 ‡ National team caps and goals as of 17 November 2026

Victor Stînă (born 20 March 1998) is a Moldovan professional footballer who plays as a midfielder for Azerbaijan Premier League club Kapaz and the Moldova national team.

== Club career ==
Stînă made his professional debut for Zimbru in the Divizia Națională on 20 May 2016 against Academia Chișinău, coming on as a 77th-minute substitute.

On 21 September 2018, he signed for Romanian Liga I club Astra Giurgiu.

== International career ==
He has represented Moldova at Under-19 and Under-21 level.

During the qualifiers for the 2021 UEFA European Under-21 Championship, he featured in both the matches that saw Moldova achieve historical home wins against Wales (2–1) and Belgium (1–0).

On June 3 2022 he made his senior international debut in the UEFA Nations League against Liechtenstein. On 25 September 2022 he scored his first goals for Moldova, coming off the bench to score 2 stoppage time goals in a 2-0 win over Liechtenstein

=== International goals ===
No.	Date	Venue	Opponent	Score	Result	Competition
1.	25 September 2022	Zimbru Stadium, Chişinău, Moldova	Liechtenstein	1–0	2–0	2022–23 UEFA Nations League
2.	25 September 2022	Zimbru Stadium, Chişinău, Moldova	Liechtenstein	2–0	2–0	2022–23 UEFA Nations League
3.	8 June 2024	Zimbru Stadium, Chişinău, Moldova	Cyprus	2–2	3–2	Friendly
4.	30 March 2026	GSP Stadium, Nicosia, Cyprus	Cyprus	2–3	2–3	Friendly

== Personal life ==
His father, Victor Stînă Sr., is a former football referee.
