= Márcio Vieira =

Andorran footballer

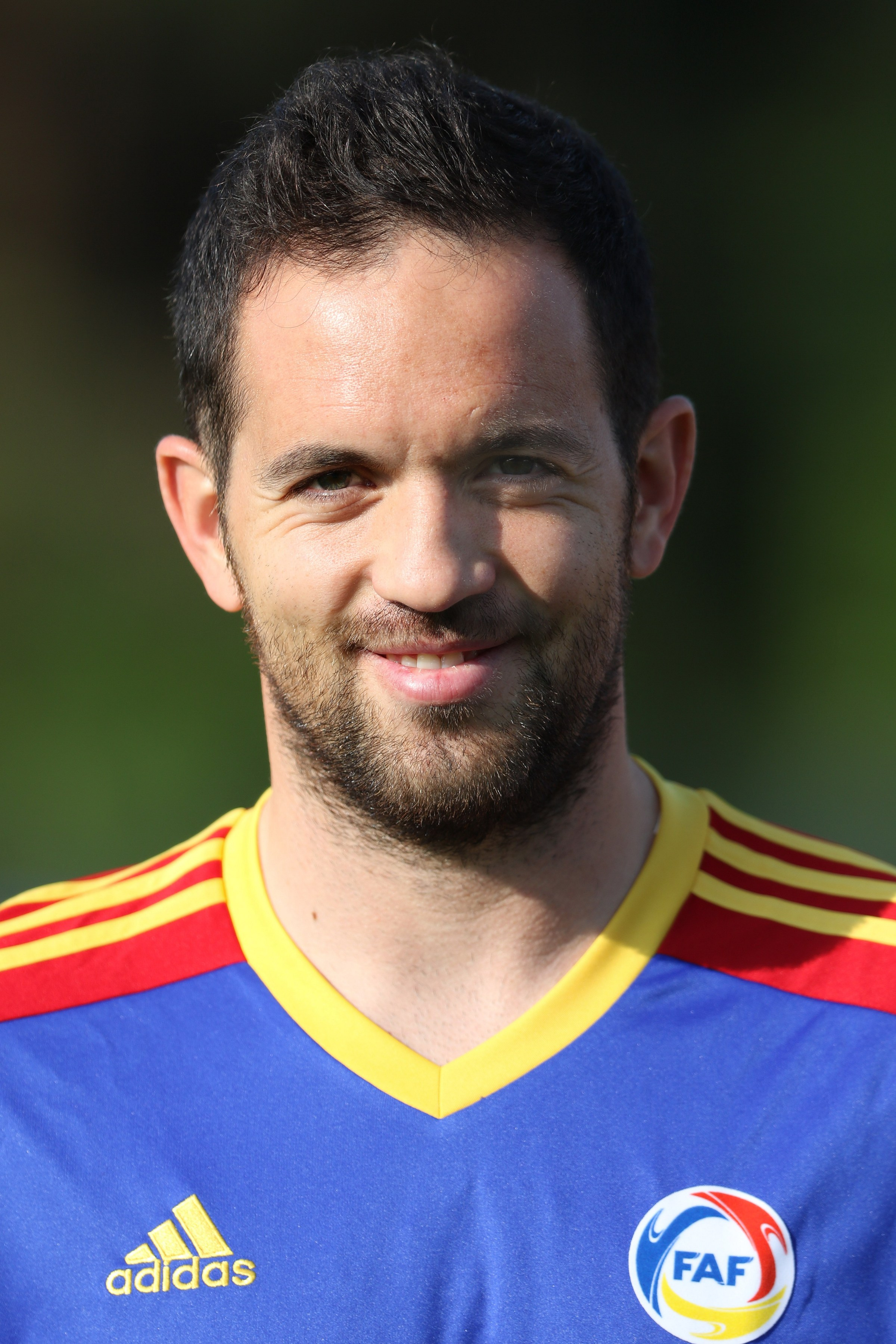
- Vieira with Andorra in 2016

Personal information
- Full name: Márcio Vieira de Vasconcelos
- Date of birth: 10 October 1984 (age 42)
- Place of birth: Andorra la Vella, Andorra
- Height: 1.80 m (5 ft 11 in)
- Position: Midfielder

Youth career
- 2000–2002: Marco

Senior career*
Years	Team	Apps	(Gls)
2002–2006	Marco	16	(1)
2002–2003	→ Alpendorada (loan)		
2004–2005	→ Alpendorada (loan)		
2006–2007	Eivissa-Ibiza	14	(0)
2007–2008	Teruel	31	(1)
2008–2023	Atlético Monzón	394	(55)
2023–2024	Marco 09	3	(0)

International career
2005–2024	Andorra	129	(2)
- * Club domestic league appearances and goals as of 8 June 2024

Márcio Vieira de Vasconcelos (born 10 October 1984), known as Vieira, is an Andorran footballer who plays as a midfielder.

== Club career ==
Born in Andorra la Vella to Portuguese parents who hailed from Marco de Canaveses, Porto District, Vieira's biggest achievement as a professional was appearing for F.C. Marco in two Segunda Liga seasons even though he only played a total of 15 matches, all in 2005–06. He all but spent the rest of his career in Spanish amateur football, his first team being SE Eivissa-Ibiza.

Vieira signed for Atlético Monzón in summer 2008, remaining in Aragon for 15 years. The 38-year-old returned to Portugal on 27 July 2023, joining amateurs A.D. Marco 09 who had risen from the ashes of his first club.

== International career ==
Vieira won his first cap for the Andorra national team on 12 October 2005, starting and being replaced early into the second half of a 0–3 home loss against Armenia for the 2006 FIFA World Cup qualifiers. He played his 100th international on 17 November 2020, in the 5–0 defeat to Latvia for the 2020–21 UEFA Nations League.

=== International goal ===
Scores and results list Andorra's goal tally first.

No	Date	Venue	Opponent	Score	Result	Competition
1.	14 June 2022	Zimbru Stadium, Chișinău, Moldova	Moldova	1–1	1–2	2022–23 UEFA Nations League
2.	16 June 2023	Estadi Nacional, Andorra la Vella, Andorra	Switzerland	1–2	1–2	UEFA Euro 2024 qualifying

== Personal life ==
Vieira worked as a coordinator of grassroots football during his playing career.

== See also ==
- List of men's footballers with 100 or more international caps
