= 2022–23 UEFA Nations League D =

Tournament details
- Dates: 2 June – 26 September 2022
- Teams: 7
- Promoted: Estonia; Latvia

Tournament statistics
- Matches played: 18
- Goals scored: 44 (2.44 per match)
- Attendance: 55,229 (3,068 per match)
- Top scorer(s): (Latvia) Vladislavs Gutkovskis (5 goals)

The 2022–23 UEFA Nations League D was the fourth and lowest division of the 2022–23 edition of the UEFA Nations League, the third season of the international football competition involving the men's national teams of the 55 member associations of UEFA.

== Format ==
League D consisted of the seven lowest-ranked UEFA members (ranked from 49 to 55) in the 2022–23 UEFA Nations League access list, split into two groups (one group of four teams and one group of three teams). Each team played four or six matches within their group, using the home-and-away round-robin format in June (quadruple matchdays) and September 2022 (double matchdays). The winners of both groups were promoted to the 2024–25 UEFA Nations League C.

== Teams ==
=== Team changes ===
The following were the team changes in League D from the 2020–21 season:

Incoming
Relegated from
Nations League C
- Estonia
- Moldova

Outgoing
Promoted to
Nations League C
- Gibraltar
- Faroe Islands

=== Seeding ===
In the 2022–23 access list, UEFA ranked teams based on the 2020–21 Nations League overall ranking. The seeding pots for the league phase were confirmed on 22 September 2021, and were based on the access list ranking.

Pot 1
Team	Rank
Estonia (Note: The identity of the play-out losers was not known at the time of the draw.)	49
Moldova	50
Liechtenstein	51
Malta	52

Pot 2
Team	Rank
Latvia	53
San Marino	54
Andorra	55

The draw for the league phase took place at the UEFA headquarters in Nyon, Switzerland on 16 December 2021, 18:00 CET. Group D1 contained two teams from Pot 1 and two teams from Pot 2, while Group D2 contained two teams from Pot 1 and one team from Pot 2. Due to restrictions of excessive travel, only one of Andorra or Malta could be drawn with the winner of the Moldova v Kazakhstan play-out tie.

== Groups ==
The fixture list was confirmed by UEFA on 17 December 2021, the day following the draw.

Times are CEST (UTC+2), as listed by UEFA (local times, if different, are in parentheses).

=== Group 1 ===
Pos	Team	Pld	W	D	L	GF	GA	GD	Pts	Promotion	(Latvia)	(Moldova)	(Andorra)	(Liechtenstein)
1	Latvia (P)	6	4	1	1	12	5	+7	13 (Note: Tied on head-to-head points (3). Head-to-head goal difference: Latvia +1, Moldova −1.)	Promotion to League C	—	1–2	3–0	1–0
2	Moldova	6	4	1	1	10	6	+4	13		2–4	—	2–1	2–0
3	Andorra	6	2	2	2	6	7	−1	8		1–1	0–0	—	2–1
4	Liechtenstein	6	0	0	6	1	11	−10	0		0–2	0–2	0–2	—

Source: UEFA
Rules for classification: Tiebreakers
(P) Promoted
Notes:
3 June 2022
18:00 (19:00 UTC+3)

Latvia	3–0	Andorra
Uldriķis 9', 77'; J. Ikaunieks 85' (pen.)	Report

Daugava Stadium, Riga
Attendance: 5,863
Referee: Tomasz Musiał (Poland)
3 June 2022
20:45

Liechtenstein	0–2	Moldova
	Report	Nicolaescu 5' (pen.); Bolohan 90+1'

Rheinpark Stadion, Vaduz
Attendance: 903
Referee: Giorgi Kruashvili (Georgia)

6 June 2022
18:00 (19:00 UTC+3)

Latvia	1–0	Liechtenstein
Zjuzins 73'	Report

Daugava Stadium, Riga
Attendance: 5,966
Referee: Mario Zebec (Croatia)
6 June 2022
20:45

Andorra	0–0	Moldova
	Report

Estadi Nacional, Andorra la Vella
Attendance: 756
Referee: Lionel Tschudi (Switzerland)

10 June 2022
18:00 (19:00 UTC+3)

Moldova	2–4	Latvia
Nicolaescu 5' (pen.); Moțpan 64'	Report	Gutkovskis 19', 60'; J. Ikaunieks 26', 75'

Stadionul Zimbru, Chișinău
Attendance: 4,842
Referee: Andrew Madley (England)
10 June 2022
20:45

Andorra	2–1	Liechtenstein
Aláez 78' (pen.); Rubio 82'	Report	Meier 90+3'

Estadi Nacional, Andorra la Vella
Attendance: 932
Referee: Nejc Kajtazović (Slovenia)

14 June 2022
18:00 (19:00 UTC+3)

Moldova	2–1	Andorra
Caimacov 26' (pen.); Nicolaescu 50' (pen.)	Report	M. Vieira 45+4'

Stadionul Zimbru, Chișinău
Attendance: 4,275
Referee: Peter Kjaesgaard (Denmark)
14 June 2022
20:45

Liechtenstein	0–2	Latvia
	Report	Gutkovskis 20', 28'

Rheinpark Stadion, Vaduz
Attendance: 885
Referee: Aleksandar Stavrev (North Macedonia)

22 September 2022
18:00 (19:00 UTC+3)

Latvia	1–2	Moldova
J. Ikaunieks 55'	Report	Revenco 26'; Nicolaescu 45'

Skonto Stadium, Riga
Attendance: 6,711
Referee: António Nobre (Portugal)
22 September 2022
20:45

Liechtenstein	0–2	Andorra
	Report	Rosas 4'; Cervós 80'

Rheinpark Stadion, Vaduz
Attendance: 914
Referee: Juxhin Xhaja (Albania)

25 September 2022
15:00

Andorra	1–1	Latvia
Rosas 88'	Report	Gutkovskis 50'

Estadi Nacional, Andorra la Vella
Attendance: 1,102
Referee: Anastasios Papapetrou (Greece)
25 September 2022
15:00 (16:00 UTC+3)

Moldova	2–0	Liechtenstein
Stînă 90+2', 90+4'	Report

Stadionul Zimbru, Chișinău
Attendance: 5,774
Referee: Stéphanie Frappart (France)

=== Group 2 ===
Pos	Team	Pld	W	D	L	GF	GA	GD	Pts	Promotion	(Estonia)	(Malta)	(San Marino)
1	Estonia (P)	4	4	0	0	10	2	+8	12	Promotion to League C	—	2–1	2–0
2	Malta	4	2	0	2	5	4	+1	6		1–2	—	1–0
3	San Marino	4	0	0	4	0	9	−9	0		0–4	0–2	—

Source: UEFA
Rules for classification: Tiebreakers
(P) Promoted
2 June 2022
20:45 (21:45 UTC+3)

Estonia	2–0	San Marino
Kirss 24'; Tamm 32'	Report

A. Le Coq Arena, Tallinn
Attendance: 3,533
Referee: Ioannis Papadopoulos (Greece)

5 June 2022
15:00

San Marino	0–2	Malta
	Report	Busuttil 59'; Guillaumier 75'

San Marino Stadium, Serravalle
Attendance: 558
Referee: Aliyar Aghayev (Azerbaijan)

9 June 2022
20:45

Malta	1–2	Estonia
Hein 56' (o.g.)	Report	Vassiljev 21'; Anier 90+4'

National Stadium, Ta' Qali
Attendance: 3,422
Referee: Bobby Madden (Scotland)

12 June 2022
20:45

Malta	1–0	San Marino
Z. Muscat 50'	Report

National Stadium, Ta' Qali
Attendance: 2,646
Referee: Dennis Higler (Netherlands)

23 September 2022
18:00 (19:00 UTC+3)

Estonia	2–1	Malta
Sappinen 45+6' (pen.); Anier 86'	Report	Teuma 51' (pen.)

A. Le Coq Arena, Tallinn
Attendance: 5,539
Referee: Daniel Siebert (Germany)

26 September 2022
20:45

San Marino	0–4	Estonia
	Report	Anier 38', 77'; Teniste 56'; Sappinen 66'

San Marino Stadium, Serravalle
Attendance: 608
Referee: Kateryna Monzul (Ukraine)

== Goalscorers ==
There were 44 goals scored in 18 matches, for an average of 2.44 goals per match.

5 goals

- (Latvia) Vladislavs Gutkovskis

4 goals

- (Estonia) Henri Anier
- (Latvia) Jānis Ikaunieks
- (Moldova) Ion Nicolaescu

2 goals

- (Andorra) Albert Rosas
- (Estonia) Rauno Sappinen
- (Latvia) Roberts Uldriķis
- (Moldova) Victor Stînă

1 goal

- (Andorra) Jordi Aláez
- (Andorra) Joan Cervós
- (Andorra) Jesús Rubio
- (Andorra) Márcio Vieira
- (Estonia) Robert Kirss
- (Estonia) Joonas Tamm
- (Estonia) Taijo Teniste
- (Estonia) Konstantin Vassiljev
- (Latvia) Artūrs Zjuzins
- (Liechtenstein) Livio Meier
- (Malta) Jan Busuttil
- (Malta) Matthew Guillaumier
- (Malta) Zach Muscat
- (Malta) Teddy Teuma
- (Moldova) Vadim Bolohan
- (Moldova) Mihail Caimacov
- (Moldova) Nichita Moțpan
- (Moldova) Ioan-Călin Revenco

1 own goal

- (Estonia) Karl Hein (against Malta)

== Overall ranking ==
The seven League D teams were ranked 49th to 55th overall in the 2022–23 UEFA Nations League according to the following rules:

- The teams finishing first in the groups were ranked 49th to 50th according to the results of the league phase, not considering the results against the fourth-placed team.
- The teams finishing second in the groups were ranked 51st to 52nd according to the results of the league phase, not considering the results against the fourth-placed team.
- The teams finishing third in the groups were ranked 53rd to 54th according to the results of the league phase, not considering the results against the fourth-placed team.
- The team finishing fourth in Group D1 was ranked 55th.

Rnk	Grp	Team	Pld	W	D	L	GF	GA	GD	Pts
49	D2	Estonia	4	4	0	0	10	2	+8	12
50	D1	Latvia	4	2	1	1	9	5	+4	7
51	D1	Moldova	4	2	1	1	6	6	0	7
52	D2	Malta	4	2	0	2	5	4	+1	6
53	D1	Andorra	4	0	2	2	2	6	−4	2
54	D2	San Marino	4	0	0	4	0	9	−9	0
55	D1	Liechtenstein	6	0	0	6	1	11	−10	0

Source: UEFA
Rules for classification: Ranking criteria

== Euro 2024 qualifying play-offs ==
Unlike the UEFA Euro 2020 qualifying play-offs, the now-downsized League D did not have its own play-off path. Instead, if any of Leagues A, B, or C had fewer than four teams that did not qualify directly for Euro 2024, the best-ranked group winner of League D would advance to the play-offs (unless that team already qualified for Euro 2024). Any remaining spots were allocated based on the Nations League overall ranking, subject to the restriction that group winners from Leagues A, B, and C could not face teams from a higher league. Therefore, additional teams from League D could only advance to the playoffs if enough teams from League C qualified directly for the tournament.

As only two teams from League A failed to qualify for Euro 2024 directly, the best-ranked group winner of League D, Estonia, advanced to Path A of the play-offs.

League D
Rank	Team
49 ^{BD}	Estonia
50	Latvia
51	Moldova
52	Malta
53	Andorra
54	San Marino
55	Liechtenstein

Key

- ^{BD} Best group winner from Nations League D
- Team in **bold** advanced to play-offs
