= Joan Cervós =

Andorran footballer

Personal information
- Full name: Joan Cervós Moro
- Date of birth: 24 February 1998 (age 28)
- Place of birth: Andorra la Vella, Andorra
- Height: 1.80 m (5 ft 11 in)
- Position: Left-back

Team information
- Current team: San Cristóbal
- Number: 3

Youth career
- 2013–2017: FC Andorra

Senior career*
Years	Team	Apps	(Gls)
2017–2018	FC Andorra	33	(1)
2018	Santboià	14	(0)
2018–2019	FC Andorra	2	(0)
2020–2021	Colorado Springs Switchbacks	15	(1)
2021	Prat	1	(0)
2021–2022	Castelldefels	27	(0)
2022–2023	Rudar Prijedor	24	(3)
2023–	San Cristóbal	79	(1)

International career^{‡}
2013–2014	Andorra U17	6	(0)
2015–2016	Andorra U19	6	(0)
2016–2020	Andorra U21	8	(0)
2018–	Andorra	73	(1)
- * Club domestic league appearances and goals as of 22 February 2026 ‡ National team caps and goals as of 17 November 2025

Joan Cervós Moro (born 24 February 1998) is an Andorran professional footballer who plays as a left-back for Tercera Federación side San Cristóbal and the Andorra national team.

== Club career ==
=== Colorado Springs Switchbacks ===
In January 2020, Cervós joined USL Championship club Colorado Springs Switchbacks FC. He made his league debut for the club in the opening match of the season, playing the entirety of a 2–1 away victory over OKC Energy FC.

== International career ==
Cervós made his international debut for Andorra on 3 June 2018 in a friendly match against Cape Verde. Cervós started the match before coming off in the 90+4th minute for Jordi Rubio, with the match finishing as a 2–4 loss on penalties following a 0–0 draw.

== Career statistics ==
=== International ===
As of match played 17 November 2025

National team	Year	Apps	Goals
Andorra	2018	7	0
Andorra	2019	10	0
Andorra	2020	5	0
Andorra	2021	11	0
Andorra	2022	10	1
Andorra	2023	10	0
Andorra	2024	10	0
Andorra	2025	10	0
Total		73	1

=== International goal ===
Scores and results list Andorra's goal tally first.

No	Date	Venue	Opponent	Score	Result	Competition
1.	22 September 2022	Rheinpark Stadion, Vaduz, Liechtenstein	Liechtenstein	2–0	2–0	2022–23 UEFA Nations League
