= UEFA Euro 2024 qualifying =

Football competition

Tournament details
- Dates: 23 March 2023 – 26 March 2024
- Teams: 53

Tournament statistics
- Matches played: 239
- Goals scored: 690 (2.89 per match)
- Attendance: 5,346,891 (22,372 per match)
- Top scorer(s): (Belgium) Romelu Lukaku (14 goals)

The UEFA Euro 2024 qualifying tournament was a football competition that was played from March 2023 to March 2024 to determine the 23 UEFA member men's national teams that would join the automatically qualified host team Germany in the UEFA Euro 2024 final tournament. The competition was linked with the 2022–23 UEFA Nations League, which gave countries a secondary route to qualify for the final tournament.

A total of 53 UEFA member associations entered the qualifying process. The draw for the qualifying group stage took place at the Festhalle in Frankfurt on 9 October 2022.

== Qualified teams ==
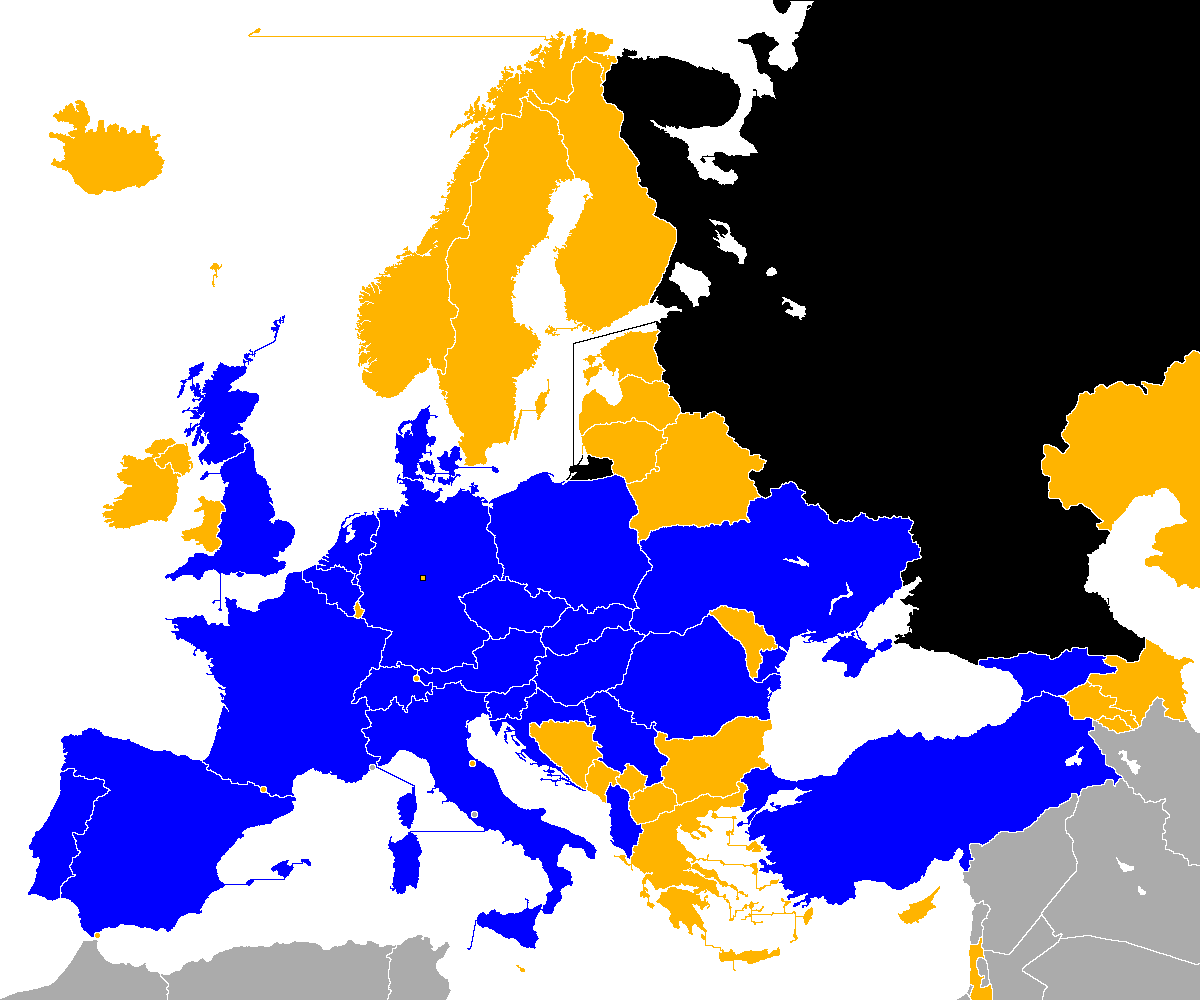
Team qualified Team failed to qualify Team suspended Not a member of UEFA

Team	Qualified as	Qualified on	Previous appearances in tournament (Note: Bold indicates champion for that year. Italic indicates host for that year.)
Germany (Note: From 1972 to 1988, Germany competed as West Germany.)	Host	27 September 2018	13 (**1972**, 1976, **1980**, 1984, 1988, 1992, **1996**, 2000, 2004, 2008, 2012, 2016, 2020)
Belgium	Group F winner	13 October 2023	6 (1972, 1980, 1984, 2000, 2016, 2020)
France	Group B winner	13 October 2023	10 (1960, **1984**, 1992, 1996, **2000**, 2004, 2008, 2012, 2016, 2020)
Portugal	Group J winner	13 October 2023	8 (1984, 1996, 2000, 2004, 2008, 2012, **2016**, 2020)
Scotland	Group A runner-up	15 October 2023	3 (1992, 1996, 2020)
Spain	Group A winner	15 October 2023	11 (**1964**, 1980, 1984, 1988, 1996, 2000, 2004, **2008**, **2012**, 2016, 2020)
Turkey	Group D winner	15 October 2023	5 (1996, 2000, 2008, 2016, 2020)
Austria	Group F runner-up	16 October 2023	3 (2008, 2016, 2020)
England	Group C winner	17 October 2023	10 (1968, 1980, 1988, 1992, 1996, 2000, 2004, 2012, 2016, 2020)
Hungary	Group G winner	16 November 2023	4 (1964, 1972, 2016, 2020)
Slovakia (Note: From 1960 to 1980, both Slovakia and the Czech Republic competed as Czechoslovakia.)	Group J runner-up	16 November 2023	5 (1960, **1976**, 1980, 2016, 2020)
Albania	Group E winner	17 November 2023	1 (2016)
Denmark	Group H winner	17 November 2023	9 (1964, 1984, 1988, **1992**, 1996, 2000, 2004, 2012, 2020)
Netherlands	Group B runner-up	18 November 2023	10 (1976, 1980, **1988**, 1992, 1996, 2000, 2004, 2008, 2012, 2020)
Romania	Group I winner	18 November 2023	5 (1984, 1996, 2000, 2008, 2016)
Switzerland	Group I runner-up	18 November 2023	5 (1996, 2004, 2008, 2016, 2020)
Serbia (Note: From 1960 to 1984, Serbia competed as Yugoslavia, and in 2000 as FR Yugoslavia.)	Group G runner-up	19 November 2023	5 (1960, 1968, 1976, 1984, 2000) (Note: FR Yugoslavia were initially to appear in 1992 (after qualifying as Yugoslavia), but were replaced after being banned by the United Nations from all international sport.)
Czech Republic	Group E runner-up	20 November 2023	10 (1960, **1976**, 1980, 1996, 2000, 2004, 2008, 2012, 2016, 2020)
Italy	Group C runner-up	20 November 2023	10 (**1968**, 1980, 1988, 1996, 2000, 2004, 2008, 2012, 2016, **2020**)
Slovenia	Group H runner-up	20 November 2023	1 (2000)
Croatia	Group D runner-up	21 November 2023	6 (1996, 2004, 2008, 2012, 2016, 2020)
Georgia	Play-off Path C winner	26 March 2024	0 (debut)
Ukraine	Play-off Path B winner	26 March 2024	3 (2012, 2016, 2020)
Poland	Play-off Path A winner	26 March 2024	4 (2008, 2012, 2016, 2020)

== Format ==
The format was similar to the UEFA Euro 2020 qualifying competition: the group stage decided 20 of the 23 teams that would advance to the final tournament to join host Germany. The 53 UEFA member associations were divided into ten groups, with seven groups containing five teams and three containing six teams. The draw for the qualifying group stage took place on 9 October 2022, after conclusion of the league phase of the 2022–23 UEFA Nations League. The four UEFA Nations League Finals participants were drawn into groups of five teams (so they were able to compete in the Nations League Finals in June 2023). The qualifying group stage was played in a home-and-away, round-robin format on double matchdays in March, June, September, October, and November 2023. The winners and runners-up from the ten groups qualified directly to the final tournament.

Following the qualifying group stage, the remaining three teams were decided through the play-offs, held in March 2024. Twelve teams were selected based entirely on their performance in the 2022–23 UEFA Nations League. These teams were divided into three paths, each containing four teams, with one team from each path qualifying for the final tournament. The group winners of Nations Leagues A, B, and C automatically qualified for the play-off path of their league, unless they qualified for the final tournament via the qualifying group stage. If a group winner had already qualified through the qualifying group stage, they would be replaced by the next best-ranked team in the same league. However, if there were not enough non-qualified teams in the same league, then the spot would go first to the best-ranked group winner of League D, unless that team had already qualified for the final tournament. The remaining slots were then allocated to the next best team in the Nations League overall ranking. However, group winners of Leagues B and C could not face teams from a higher league.

The three play-off paths each featured two single-leg semi-finals, and one single-leg final. In the semi-finals, the best-ranked team hosted the lowest-ranked team, and the second-ranked team hosted the third-ranked team. The host of the final was drawn between the winners of the semi-final pairings. The three play-off path winners joined the twenty teams that already qualified for the final tournament through the group stage.

=== Tiebreakers for group ranking ===
If two or more teams were equal on points on completion of the group matches, the following tie-breaking criteria were applied:

1. Higher number of points obtained in the matches played among the teams in question;
2. Superior goal difference in matches played among the teams in question;
3. Higher number of goals scored in the matches played among the teams in question;
4. If, after having applied criteria 1 to 3, teams still had an equal ranking, criteria 1 to 3 were reapplied exclusively to the matches between the teams in question to determine their final rankings. (Note: When there were two or more teams tied in points, criteria 1 to 3 were applied. After these criteria were applied, they may define the position of some of the teams involved, but not all of them. For example, if there was a three-way tie on points, the application of the first three criteria may only break the tie for one of the teams, leaving the other two teams still tied. In this case, the tiebreaking procedure was resumed, from the beginning, for those teams that were still tied.) If this procedure did not lead to a decision, criteria 5 to 11 applied;
5. Superior goal difference in all group matches;
6. Higher number of goals scored in all group matches;
7. Higher number of away goals scored in all group matches;
8. Higher number of wins in all group matches;
9. Higher number of away wins in all group matches;
10. Fair play conduct in all group matches (1 point for a single yellow card, 3 points for a red card as a consequence of two yellow cards, 3 points for a direct red card, 4 points for a yellow card followed by a direct red card);
11. Position in the UEFA Nations League overall ranking.

=== Criteria for overall ranking ===
To determine the overall rankings of the European Qualifiers, results against teams in sixth place were discarded and the following criteria were applied:

1. Position in the group;
2. Higher number of points;
3. Superior goal difference;
4. Higher number of goals scored;
5. Higher number of goals scored away from home;
6. Higher number of wins;
7. Higher number of wins away from home;
8. Fair play conduct (1 point for a single yellow card, 3 points for a red card as a consequence of two yellow cards, 3 points for a direct red card, 4 points for a yellow card followed by a direct red card);
9. Position in the UEFA Nations League overall ranking.

== Schedule ==
Below was the schedule of the UEFA Euro 2024 qualifying campaign.

Stage	Matchday	Dates
Qualifying group stage	Matchday 1	23–25 March 2023
Qualifying group stage	Matchday 2	26–28 March 2023
Qualifying group stage	Matchday 3	16–17 June 2023
Qualifying group stage	Matchday 4	19–20 June 2023
Qualifying group stage	Matchday 5	7–9 September 2023
Qualifying group stage	Matchday 6	10–12 September 2023
Qualifying group stage	Matchday 7	12–14 October 2023 (Note: The fixtures of matchdays 7 and 8 of Group I involving Israel were moved to 15 and 12 November 2023, respectively, due to the Gaza war.)
Qualifying group stage	Matchday 8	15–17 October 2023
Qualifying group stage	Matchday 9	16–18 November 2023
Qualifying group stage	Matchday 10	19–21 November 2023
Play-offs	Semi-finals	21 March 2024
Play-offs	Finals	26 March 2024

== Draw ==
The qualifying group stage draw was held on 9 October 2022, 12:00 CEST, at the Festhalle in Frankfurt. Of UEFA's 55 member associations, 53 compete in the qualifying competition. Host team Germany qualified directly to the final tournament, while it was confirmed on 20 September 2022 that Russia were ineligible due to the suspension from FIFA and UEFA competitions.

The 53 UEFA national teams were seeded into six pots based on the 2022–23 UEFA Nations League overall ranking following the conclusion of the league phase. The four participants of the 2023 UEFA Nations League Finals were placed into the UNL Pot and drawn into Groups A–D, which only had five teams, so that they only had to play eight qualifying matches, leaving two free matchdays to play in the Nations League Finals in June 2023. The next six-highest teams were then placed into Pot 1. If Germany had won their Nations League group, the UNL Pot would have contained three teams, and Pot 1 would have instead contained seven teams. Pots 2 to 5 contained ten teams, while Pot 6 contained the three lowest-ranked teams. The teams were drawn into ten groups: seven groups of five teams (Groups A–G) and three groups of six teams (Groups H–J). The draw started with the UNL Pot and Pot 1, and continued from Pot 2 to Pot 6, from where a team was drawn and assigned to the first available group (based on draw conditions) in alphabetical order.

The following restrictions were applied with computer assistance:

- Prohibited clashes: For political reasons, matches between the following pairs of teams were considered prohibited clashes, unable to be drawn into the same group: Armenia / Azerbaijan, Belarus / Ukraine, Gibraltar / Spain, Kosovo / Bosnia and Herzegovina, Kosovo / Serbia.
- Winter venues: A maximum of two teams whose venues were identified as having high or medium risk of severe winter conditions could be placed in each group: Belarus, Estonia, Faroe Islands, Finland, Iceland, Latvia, Lithuania, Norway.
  - The two "hard winter venues", Faroe Islands and Iceland, generally could not host games in March or November; the others were to play as few home matches as possible in March and November.
- Excessive travel: A maximum of one pair of teams identified with excessive travel distance in relation to other countries could be placed in each group:
  - Azerbaijan: with Gibraltar, Iceland, Portugal.
  - Iceland: with Cyprus, Georgia, Israel. (Armenia were also identified with Iceland for excessive travel distance, but the teams were in the same pot for the draw.)
  - Kazakhstan: with Andorra, England, France, Gibraltar, Iceland, Malta, Northern Ireland, Portugal, Republic of Ireland, Scotland, Spain, Wales. (Faroe Islands were also identified with Kazakhstan for excessive travel distance, but the teams were in the same pot for the draw.)

=== Seeding ===
The teams were seeded based on the September 2022 UEFA Nations League overall rankings.

Final tournament hosts
Team	Rank
Germany	10

Teams entering qualifying group stage

UNL pot
Team	Rank
Netherlands	1
Croatia	2
Spain	3
Italy (title holders)	4

Pot 1
Team	Rank
Denmark	5
Portugal	6
Belgium	7
Hungary	8
Switzerland	9
Poland	11

Pot 4
Team	Rank
Georgia	33
Greece	34
Turkey	35
Kazakhstan	36
Luxembourg	37
Azerbaijan	38
Kosovo	39
Bulgaria	40
Faroe Islands	41
North Macedonia	42

Pot 2
Team	Rank
France	12
Austria	13
Czech Republic	14
England	15
Wales	16
Israel	17
Bosnia and Herzegovina	18
Serbia	19
Scotland	20
Finland	21

Pot 5
Team	Rank
Slovakia	43
Northern Ireland	44
Cyprus	45
Belarus	46
Lithuania	47
Gibraltar	48
Estonia	49
Latvia	50
Moldova	51
Malta	52

Pot 3
Team	Rank
Ukraine	22
Iceland	23
Norway	24
Slovenia	25
Republic of Ireland	26
Albania	27
Montenegro	28
Romania	29
Sweden	30
Armenia	31

Pot 6
Team	Rank
Andorra	53
San Marino	54
Liechtenstein	55

Banned from entering qualifying
Team	Rank
Russia	32

== Summary ==
Group winners and runners-up qualified directly for UEFA Euro 2024
Teams advanced to the play-offs, selected based on their performance in the 2022–23 UEFA Nations League
Other teams were eliminated after the qualifying group stage

Group A	Group B	Group C	Group D	Group E	Group F	Group G	Group H	Group I	Group J
Spain Scotland	France Netherlands	England Italy	Turkey Croatia	Albania Czech Republic	Belgium Austria	Hungary Serbia	Denmark Slovenia	Romania Switzerland	Portugal Slovakia
Norway	Greece	Ukraine	Wales	Poland	Sweden	Montenegro	Finland	Israel	Luxembourg
Georgia	Republic of Ireland	North Macedonia	Armenia	Moldova	Azerbaijan	Lithuania	Kazakhstan	Belarus	Iceland
Cyprus	Gibraltar	Malta	Latvia	Faroe Islands	Estonia	Bulgaria	Northern Ireland	Kosovo	Bosnia and Herzegovina
							San Marino	Andorra	Liechtenstein

== Groups ==
The fixture list was confirmed by UEFA on 10 October 2022, the day following the draw. The schedule was initially released on the day of the draw, but was withdrawn shortly after its distribution due to an alleged calendar issue. However, UEFA ultimately confirmed the initial schedule the following day, with no changes made. Group matches took place from 23 March to 21 November 2023.

=== Group A ===
Pos	Team	Pld	W	D	L	GF	GA	GD	Pts	Qualification	(Spain)	(Scotland)	(Norway)	(Georgia (country))	(Cyprus)
1	Spain	8	7	0	1	25	5	+20	21	Qualify for final tournament	—	2–0	3–0	3–1	6–0
2	Scotland	8	5	2	1	17	8	+9	17	Qualify for final tournament	2–0	—	3–3	2–0	3–0
3	Norway	8	3	2	3	14	12	+2	11		0–1	1–2	—	2–1	3–1
4	Georgia	8	2	2	4	12	18	−6	8	Advance to play-offs via Nations League	1–7	2–2	1–1	—	4–0
5	Cyprus	8	0	0	8	3	28	−25	0		1–3	0–3	0–4	1–2	—

Source: UEFA

=== Group B ===
Pos	Team	Pld	W	D	L	GF	GA	GD	Pts	Qualification	(France)	(Netherlands)	(Greece)	(Republic of Ireland)	(Gibraltar)
1	France	8	7	1	0	29	3	+26	22	Qualify for final tournament	—	4–0	1–0	2–0	14–0
2	Netherlands	8	6	0	2	17	7	+10	18	Qualify for final tournament	1–2	—	3–0	1–0	3–0
3	Greece	8	4	1	3	14	8	+6	13	Advance to play-offs via Nations League	2–2	0–1	—	2–1	5–0
4	Republic of Ireland	8	2	0	6	9	10	−1	6		0–1	1–2	0–2	—	3–0
5	Gibraltar	8	0	0	8	0	41	−41	0		0–3	0–6	0–3	0–4	—

Source: UEFA

=== Group C ===
Pos	Team	Pld	W	D	L	GF	GA	GD	Pts	Qualification	(England)	(Italy)	(Ukraine)	(North Macedonia)	(Malta)
1	England	8	6	2	0	22	4	+18	20	Qualify for final tournament	—	3–1	2–0	7–0	2–0
2	Italy	8	4	2	2	16	9	+7	14 (Note: Head-to-head points: Italy 4, Ukraine 1.)	Qualify for final tournament	1–2	—	2–1	5–2	4–0
3	Ukraine	8	4	2	2	11	8	+3	14	Advance to play-offs via Nations League	1–1	0–0	—	2–0	1–0
4	North Macedonia	8	2	2	4	10	20	−10	8		1–1	1–1	2–3	—	2–1
5	Malta	8	0	0	8	2	20	−18	0		0–4	0–2	1–3	0–2	—

Source: UEFA

=== Group D ===
Pos	Team	Pld	W	D	L	GF	GA	GD	Pts	Qualification	(Turkey)	(Croatia)	(Wales)	(Armenia)	(Latvia)
1	Turkey	8	5	2	1	14	7	+7	17	Qualify for final tournament	—	0–2	2–0	1–1	4–0
2	Croatia	8	5	1	2	13	4	+9	16	Qualify for final tournament	0–1	—	1–1	1–0	5–0
3	Wales	8	3	3	2	10	10	0	12	Advance to play-offs via Nations League	1–1	2–1	—	2–4	1–0
4	Armenia	8	2	2	4	9	11	−2	8		1–2	0–1	1–1	—	2–1
5	Latvia	8	1	0	7	5	19	−14	3		2–3	0–2	0–2	2–0	—

Source: UEFA

=== Group E ===
Pos	Team	Pld	W	D	L	GF	GA	GD	Pts	Qualification	(Albania)	(Czech Republic)	(Poland)	(Moldova)	(Faroe Islands)
1	Albania	8	4	3	1	12	4	+8	15 (Note: Head to head points: Albania 4, Czech Republic 1.)	Qualify for final tournament	—	3–0	2–0	2–0	0–0
2	Czech Republic	8	4	3	1	12	6	+6	15	Qualify for final tournament	1–1	—	3–1	3–0	1–0
3	Poland	8	3	2	3	10	10	0	11	Advance to play-offs via Nations League	1–0	1–1	—	1–1	2–0
4	Moldova	8	2	4	2	7	10	−3	10		1–1	0–0	3–2	—	1–1
5	Faroe Islands	8	0	2	6	2	13	−11	2		1–3	0–3	0–2	0–1	—

Source: UEFA

=== Group F ===
Pos	Team	Pld	W	D	L	GF	GA	GD	Pts	Qualification	(Belgium)	(Austria)	(Sweden)	(Azerbaijan)	(Estonia)
1	Belgium	8	6	2	0	22	4	+18	20	Qualify for final tournament	—	1–1	1–1 (Note: The Belgium v Sweden match was abandoned at 1–1 at half-time for security reasons, as two Swedish supporters had been killed in a terrorist shooting in Brussels prior to the match; the score was later confirmed as final.)	5–0	5–0
2	Austria	8	6	1	1	17	7	+10	19	Qualify for final tournament	2–3	—	2–0	4–1	2–1
3	Sweden	8	3	1	4	14	12	+2	10		0–3	1–3	—	5–0	2–0
4	Azerbaijan	8	2	1	5	7	17	−10	7		0–1	0–1	3–0	—	1–1
5	Estonia	8	0	1	7	2	22	−20	1	Advance to play-offs via Nations League	0–3	0–2	0–5	0–2	—

Source: UEFA

=== Group G ===
Pos	Team	Pld	W	D	L	GF	GA	GD	Pts	Qualification	(Hungary)	(Serbia)	(Montenegro)	(Lithuania)	(Bulgaria)
1	Hungary	8	5	3	0	16	7	+9	18	Qualify for final tournament	—	2–1	3–1	2–0	3–0
2	Serbia	8	4	2	2	15	9	+6	14	Qualify for final tournament	1–2	—	3–1	2–0	2–2
3	Montenegro	8	3	2	3	9	11	−2	11		0–0	0–2	—	2–0	2–1
4	Lithuania	8	1	3	4	8	14	−6	6		2–2	1–3	2–2	—	1–1
5	Bulgaria	8	0	4	4	7	14	−7	4		2–2	1–1	0–1	0–2	—

Source: UEFA

=== Group H ===
Pos	Team	Pld	W	D	L	GF	GA	GD	Pts	Qualification	(Denmark)	(Slovenia)	(Finland)	(Kazakhstan)	(Northern Ireland)	(San Marino)
1	Denmark	10	7	1	2	19	10	+9	22 (Note: Head to head points: Denmark 4, Slovenia 1.)	Qualify for final tournament	—	2–1	3–1	3–1	1–0	4–0
2	Slovenia	10	7	1	2	20	9	+11	22	Qualify for final tournament	1–1	—	3–0	2–1	4–2	2–0
3	Finland	10	6	0	4	18	10	+8	18 (Note: Goal difference in all group matches: Finland +8, Kazakhstan +4.)	Advance to play-offs via Nations League	0–1	2–0	—	1–2	4–0	6–0
4	Kazakhstan	10	6	0	4	16	12	+4	18	Advance to play-offs via Nations League	3–2	1–2	0–1	—	1–0	3–1
5	Northern Ireland	10	3	0	7	9	13	−4	9		2–0	0–1	0–1	0–1	—	3–0
6	San Marino	10	0	0	10	3	31	−28	0		1–2	0–4	1–2	0–3	0–2	—

Source: UEFA

=== Group I ===
Pos	Team	Pld	W	D	L	GF	GA	GD	Pts	Qualification	(Romania)	(Switzerland)	(Israel)	(Belarus)	(Kosovo)	(Andorra)
1	Romania	10	6	4	0	16	5	+11	22	Qualify for final tournament	—	1–0	1–1	2–1	2–0	4–0
2	Switzerland	10	4	5	1	22	11	+11	17	Qualify for final tournament	2–2	—	3–0	3–3	1–1	3–0
3	Israel	10	4	3	3	11	11	0	15	Advance to play-offs via Nations League	1–2	1–1	—	1–0	1–1	2–1
4	Belarus	10	3	3	4	9	14	−5	12		0–0	0–5	1–2	—	2–1	1–0
5	Kosovo	10	2	5	3	10	10	0	11		0–0	2–2	1–0	0–1	—	1–1
6	Andorra	10	0	2	8	3	20	−17	2		0–2	1–2	0–2	0–0	0–3	—

Source: UEFA

=== Group J ===
Pos	Team	Pld	W	D	L	GF	GA	GD	Pts	Qualification	(Portugal)	(Slovakia)	(Luxembourg)	(Iceland)	(Bosnia and Herzegovina)	(Liechtenstein)
1	Portugal	10	10	0	0	36	2	+34	30	Qualify for final tournament	—	3–2	9–0	2–0	3–0	4–0
2	Slovakia	10	7	1	2	17	8	+9	22	Qualify for final tournament	0–1	—	0–0	4–2	2–0	3–0
3	Luxembourg	10	5	2	3	13	19	−6	17	Advance to play-offs via Nations League	0–6	0–1	—	3–1	4–1	2–0
4	Iceland	10	3	1	6	17	16	+1	10	Advance to play-offs via Nations League	0–1	1–2	1–1	—	1–0	4–0
5	Bosnia and Herzegovina	10	3	0	7	9	20	−11	9	Advance to play-offs via Nations League	0–5	1–2	0–2	3–0	—	2–1
6	Liechtenstein	10	0	0	10	1	28	−27	0		0–2	0–1	0–1	0–7	0–2	—

Source: UEFA

== Play-offs ==
Teams that failed in the qualifying group stage could still qualify for the final tournament through the play-offs. Leagues A, B, and C in the UEFA Nations League were allocated one of the three remaining final tournament spots. Four teams from each league that had not already qualified for the European Championship finals competed in the play-offs of their league. The play-off berths were first allocated to each Nations League group winner, and if any of the group winners already qualify for the European Championship finals, then to the next-best ranked team of the league.

=== Team selection ===
The team selection process determined the twelve teams that competed in the play-offs based on the Nations League overall rankings, using a set of criteria that obeyed these principles:

- Leagues A, B, and C each formed a path with the four best-ranked teams not yet qualified.
- If one of those leagues had fewer than four non-qualifying teams, spots were taken first by the best group winner from League D (unless already qualified), and then by any other eligible teams based on ranking.
- Group winners from Leagues B and C could not face teams from higher leagues.

League A
Rank	Team
1 ^{GW}	Spain
2 ^{GW}	Croatia
3 ^{GW}	Italy
4 ^{GW}	Netherlands
5	Denmark
6	Portugal
7	Belgium
8	Hungary
9	Switzerland
10	Germany ^{†}
11	Poland
12	France
13	Austria
14	Czech Republic
15	England
16	Wales

League B
Rank	Team
17 ^{GW}	Israel
18 ^{GW}	Bosnia and Herzegovina
19 ^{GW}	Serbia
20 ^{GW}	Scotland
21	Finland
22	Ukraine
23	Iceland
24	Norway
25	Slovenia
26	Republic of Ireland
27	Albania
28	Montenegro
29	Romania
30	Sweden
31	Armenia
32	Russia ^{‡}

League C
Rank	Team
33 ^{GW}	Georgia
34 ^{GW}	Greece
35 ^{GW}	Turkey
36 ^{GW}	Kazakhstan
37	Luxembourg
38	Azerbaijan
39	Kosovo
40	Bulgaria
41	Faroe Islands
42	North Macedonia
43	Slovakia
44	Northern Ireland
45	Cyprus
46	Belarus
47	Lithuania
48	Gibraltar

League D
Rank	Team
49 ^{BD}	Estonia
50	Latvia
51	Moldova
52	Malta
53	Andorra
54	San Marino
55	Liechtenstein

Key

- ^{GW} Group winner from Nations League A, B or C
- ^{BD} Best group winner from Nations League D
- Team in bold advanced to play-offs
- Team qualified directly to final tournament
- † UEFA Euro 2024 host, qualified automatically
- ‡ Banned from qualifying competition

=== Draw ===
The qualifying play-off draw took place on 23 November 2023, 12:00 CET, at the UEFA headquarters in Nyon, Switzerland. The draw followed the path formation rules to determine the paths in which the non-group winners will participate. Three separate draws determining the host of the play-off final of each path also took place between the winners of the semi-final pairings (identified as semi-final 1 for seed 1 v 4, and semi-final 2 for seed 2 v 3).

Due to the specificity of the draw, the exact procedure could only be finalised following the conclusion of the qualifying group stage. No restrictions were applied to the draw, as none of the clashes prohibited by UEFA for political reasons could occur. (Note: The restriction would have applied to the following pairings: Armenia–Azerbaijan, Belarus–Ukraine, Gibraltar–Spain, Kosovo–Bosnia and Herzegovina, Kosovo–Serbia.) Based on the twelve teams that advanced to the play-offs, the three play-off paths were formed following the path formation rules, starting with League C and working up to League A:

- As there were four teams from League C (three group winners and one non-group winner), they were all placed in Path C.
- As there were five teams from League B (two group winners and three non-group winners), the two group winners were placed in Path B, while a draw decided which two of the three non-group winners were also placed in Path B.
- As there were two teams from League A (both non-group winners), they were both placed in Path A, along with the best-ranked League D group winner. The one remaining non-group winner from League B that was not drawn to Path B was then placed in Path A.

The following three non-group winners from League B (ordered by Nations League ranking) took part in the draw, with two being drawn into Path B, while the remaining team was allocated to Path A:

1. Finland
2. Ukraine
3. Iceland

The two teams drawn into Path B occupied positions B3 and B4, following their Nations League ranking, while the team drawn into Path A occupied position A3.

The following was the composition of the play-off paths:

Path A
Rank	Team
1	Poland
2	Wales
3	Finland
4	Estonia

Path B
Rank	Team
1	Israel
2	Bosnia and Herzegovina
3	Ukraine
4	Iceland

Path C
Rank	Team
1	Georgia
2	Greece
3	Kazakhstan
4	Luxembourg

The following semi-final winners were drawn to host the play-off final:

- Path A: Winner semi-final 2 (Wales v Finland)
- Path B: Winner semi-final 2 (Bosnia and Herzegovina v Ukraine)
- Path C: Winner semi-final 1 (Georgia v Luxembourg)

=== Path A ===
Home team	Score	Away team
**Semi-finals**
**Poland**	5–1	Estonia
**Wales**	4–1	Finland
**Final**
Wales	0–0 (a.e.t.) (4–5 p)	**Poland**

=== Path B ===
Home team	Score	Away team
**Semi-finals**
Israel	1–4	**Iceland**
Bosnia and Herzegovina	1–2	**Ukraine**
**Final**
**Ukraine**	2–1	Iceland

=== Path C ===
Home team	Score	Away team
**Semi-finals**
**Georgia**	2–0	Luxembourg
**Greece**	5–0	Kazakhstan
**Final**
**Georgia**	0–0 (a.e.t.) (4–2 p)	Greece

== Goalscorers ==
There were 690 goals scored in 239 matches, for an average of 2.89 goals per match.

14 goals

- (Belgium national football team) Romelu Lukaku

10 goals

- (Portugal national football team) Cristiano Ronaldo

9 goals

- (France national football team) Kylian Mbappé

8 goals

- (England national football team) Harry Kane

7 goals

- (Denmark national football team) Rasmus Højlund
- (Scotland national football team) Scott McTominay

6 goals

- (Norway national football team) Erling Haaland
- (Portugal national football team) Bruno Fernandes
- (Switzerland national football team) Zeki Amdouni

5 goals

- (Greece national football team) Georgios Masouras
- (Luxembourg national football team) Gerson Rodrigues
- (Serbia national football team) Aleksandar Mitrović
- (Slovenia national football team) Benjamin Šeško

4 goals

- (Austria national football team) Marcel Sabitzer
- (Croatia national football team) Andrej Kramarić
- (England national football team) Bukayo Saka
- (Finland national football team) Daniel Håkans
- (Georgia national football team) Khvicha Kvaratskhelia
- (Greece national football team) Anastasios Bakasetas
- (Hungary national football team) Dominik Szoboszlai
- (Hungary national football team) Barnabás Varga
- (Iceland national football team) Albert Guðmundsson
- (Kazakhstan national football team) Bakhtiyar Zaynutdinov
- (Moldova national football team) Ion Nicolaescu
- (Spain national football team) Joselu
- (Spain national football team) Álvaro Morata

3 goals

- (Albania national football team) Jasir Asani
- (Albania national football team) Nedim Bajrami
- (Armenia national football team) Lucas Zelarayán
- (Austria national football team) Christoph Baumgartner
- (Austria national football team) Michael Gregoritsch
- (Azerbaijan national football team) Emin Mahmudov
- (Belarus national football team) Max Ebong
- (Bulgaria national football team) Kiril Despodov
- (Czech Republic national football team) Václav Černý
- (Czech Republic national football team) Tomáš Souček
- (Denmark national football team) Jonas Wind
- (Finland national football team) Oliver Antman
- (Finland national football team) Teemu Pukki
- (France national football team) Olivier Giroud
- (Georgia national football team) Georges Mikautadze
- (Georgia national football team) Budu Zivzivadze
- (Iceland national football team) Hákon Arnar Haraldsson
- (Iceland national football team) Alfreð Finnbogason
- (Iceland national football team) Aron Gunnarsson
- (Italy national football team) Davide Frattesi
- (Kazakhstan national football team) Abat Aymbetov
- (Kosovo national football team) Vedat Muriqi
- (Kosovo national football team) Milot Rashica
- (Lithuania national football team) Pijus Širvys
- (Luxembourg national football team) Danel Sinani
- (Montenegro national football team) Stevan Jovetić
- (Netherlands national football team) Cody Gakpo
- (Netherlands national football team) Calvin Stengs
- (Netherlands national football team) Wout Weghorst
- (North Macedonia national football team) Enis Bardhi
- (North Macedonia national football team) Eljif Elmas
- (Northern Ireland national football team) Dion Charles
- (Poland national football team) Robert Lewandowski
- (Portugal national football team) João Cancelo
- (Portugal national football team) João Félix
- (Portugal national football team) Gonçalo Ramos
- (Portugal national football team) Bernardo Silva
- (Romania national football team) Denis Alibec
- (Romania national football team) Valentin Mihăilă
- (Romania national football team) Nicolae Stanciu
- (Scotland national football team) John McGinn
- (Serbia national football team) Dušan Vlahović
- (Slovakia national football team) Lukáš Haraslín
- (Slovenia national football team) Andraž Šporar
- (Spain national football team) Ferran Torres
- (Sweden men's national football team) Viktor Gyökeres
- (Switzerland national football team) Remo Freuler
- (Switzerland national football team) Renato Steffen
- (Switzerland national football team) Rubén Vargas
- (Ukraine national football team) Viktor Tsyhankov
- (Wales national football team) Harry Wilson

2 goals

- (Albania national football team) Taulant Seferi
- (Andorra national football team) Albert Rosas
- (Armenia national football team) Grant-Leon Ranos
- (Austria national football team) Marko Arnautović
- (Austria national football team) Konrad Laimer
- (Belarus national football team) Dmitry Antilevsky
- (Belarus national football team) Vladislav Morozov
- (Belgium national football team) Dodi Lukebakio
- (Belgium national football team) Leandro Trossard
- (Bosnia and Herzegovina national football team) Rade Krunić
- (Croatia national football team) Mateo Kovačić
- (Croatia national football team) Mario Pašalić
- (Croatia national football team) Bruno Petković
- (Czech Republic national football team) Ladislav Krejčí
- (Denmark national football team) Pierre-Emile Højbjerg
- (Denmark national football team) Joakim Mæhle
- (Denmark national football team) Robert Skov
- (England national football team) Marcus Rashford
- (Estonia national football team) Rauno Sappinen
- (Finland national football team) Benjamin Källman
- (Finland national football team) Joel Pohjanpalo
- (Finland national football team) Pyry Soiri
- (France national football team) Kingsley Coman
- (France national football team) Youssouf Fofana
- (France national football team) Marcus Thuram
- (Greece national football team) Fotis Ioannidis
- (Greece national football team) Konstantinos Mavropanos
- (Greece national football team) Dimitrios Pelkas
- (Hungary national football team) Martin Ádám
- (Hungary national football team) Roland Sallai
- (Iceland national football team) Andri Guðjohnsen
- (Iceland national football team) Orri Óskarsson
- (Iceland national football team) Gylfi Sigurðsson
- (Israel national football team) Oscar Gloukh
- (Israel national football team) Shon Weissman
- (Israel national football team) Eran Zahavi
- (Italy national football team) Domenico Berardi
- (Italy national football team) Federico Chiesa
- (Italy national football team) Mateo Retegui
- (Kazakhstan national football team) Islam Chesnokov
- (Kazakhstan national football team) Maksim Samorodov
- (Kazakhstan national football team) Askhat Tagybergen
- (Kazakhstan national football team) Yan Vorogovsky
- (Lithuania national football team) Fedor Černych
- (Lithuania national football team) Gytis Paulauskas
- (Luxembourg national football team) Yvandro Borges Sanches
- (Moldova national football team) Vladislav Baboglo
- (Montenegro national football team) Nikola Krstović
- (Montenegro national football team) Stefan Savić
- (Netherlands national football team) Nathan Aké
- (North Macedonia national football team) Jani Atanasov
- (Northern Ireland national football team) Isaac Price
- (Norway national football team) Alexander Sørloth
- (Poland national football team) Jakub Piotrowski
- (Poland national football team) Karol Świderski
- (Poland national football team) Sebastian Szymański
- (Portugal national football team) Ricardo Horta
- (Portugal national football team) Gonçalo Inácio
- (Portugal national football team) Diogo Jota
- (Republic of Ireland national football team) Evan Ferguson
- (Republic of Ireland national football team) Adam Idah
- (Republic of Ireland national football team) Mikey Johnston
- (Romania national football team) Ianis Hagi
- (Serbia national football team) Dušan Tadić
- (Slovakia national football team) Ondrej Duda
- (Slovakia national football team) Dávid Hancko
- (Slovakia national football team) Juraj Kucka
- (Slovakia national football team) Róbert Mak
- (Slovenia national football team) Erik Janža
- (Slovenia national football team) Žan Vipotnik
- (Spain national football team) Gavi
- (Spain national football team) Dani Olmo
- (Spain national football team) Lamine Yamal
- (Sweden men's national football team) Viktor Claesson
- (Sweden men's national football team) Emil Forsberg
- (Switzerland national football team) Xherdan Shaqiri
- (Switzerland national football team) Granit Xhaka
- (Turkey national football team) Kerem Aktürkoğlu
- (Turkey national football team) Cenk Tosun
- (Ukraine national football team) Artem Dovbyk
- (Ukraine national football team) Mykhailo Mudryk
- (Wales national football team) David Brooks
- (Wales national football team) Daniel James
- (Wales national football team) Neco Williams

1 goal

- (Albania national football team) Kristjan Asllani
- (Albania national football team) Sokol Cikalleshi
- (Albania national football team) Mirlind Daku
- (Albania national football team) Ernest Muçi
- (Andorra national football team) Márcio Vieira
- (Armenia national football team) Tigran Barseghyan
- (Armenia national football team) Artak Dashyan
- (Armenia national football team) Nair Tiknizyan
- (Austria national football team) Florian Kainz
- (Austria national football team) Philipp Lienhart
- (Azerbaijan national football team) Toral Bayramov
- (Azerbaijan national football team) Renat Dadashov
- (Azerbaijan national football team) Anton Kryvotsyuk
- (Azerbaijan national football team) Ramil Sheydayev
- (Belarus national football team) Denis Laptev
- (Belarus national football team) Denis Polyakov
- (Belgium national football team) Johan Bakayoko
- (Belgium national football team) Yannick Carrasco
- (Belgium national football team) Charles De Ketelaere
- (Belgium national football team) Jan Vertonghen
- (Bosnia and Herzegovina national football team) Amar Dedić
- (Bosnia and Herzegovina national football team) Edin Džeko
- (Bosnia and Herzegovina national football team) Renato Gojković
- (Bosnia and Herzegovina national football team) Amar Rahmanović
- (Bosnia and Herzegovina national football team) Miroslav Stevanović
- (Bulgaria national football team) Preslav Borukov
- (Bulgaria national football team) Spas Delev
- (Bulgaria national football team) Marin Petkov
- (Bulgaria national football team) Georgi Rusev
- (Croatia national football team) Ante Budimir
- (Croatia national football team) Luka Ivanušec
- (Croatia national football team) Lovro Majer
- (Cyprus national football team) Grigoris Kastanos
- (Cyprus national football team) Kostas Pileas
- (Cyprus national football team) Ioannis Pittas
- (Czech Republic national football team) Tomáš Chorý
- (Czech Republic national football team) Tomáš Čvančara
- (Czech Republic national football team) David Douděra
- (Czech Republic national football team) Jan Kuchta
- (Denmark national football team) Thomas Delaney
- (Denmark national football team) Christian Eriksen
- (Denmark national football team) Yussuf Poulsen
- (England national football team) Trent Alexander-Arnold
- (England national football team) Kalvin Phillips
- (England national football team) Declan Rice
- (England national football team) Kyle Walker
- (England national football team) Callum Wilson
- (Estonia national football team) Martin Vetkal
- (Faroe Islands national football team) Mads Boe Mikkelsen
- (Faroe Islands national football team) Odmar Færø
- (Finland national football team) Glen Kamara
- (Finland national football team) Robin Lod
- (Finland national football team) Robert Taylor
- (France national football team) Jonathan Clauss
- (France national football team) Ousmane Dembélé
- (France national football team) Antoine Griezmann
- (France national football team) Randal Kolo Muani
- (France national football team) Benjamin Pavard
- (France national football team) Adrien Rabiot
- (France national football team) Aurélien Tchouaméni
- (France national football team) Dayot Upamecano
- (France national football team) Warren Zaïre-Emery
- (Georgia national football team) Giorgi Chakvetadze
- (Georgia national football team) Zuriko Davitashvili
- (Georgia national football team) Otar Kiteishvili
- (Georgia national football team) Levan Shengelia
- (Greece national football team) Giorgos Giakoumakis
- (Greece national football team) Dimitrios Kourbelis
- (Greece national football team) Manolis Siopis
- (Hungary national football team) Ádám Nagy
- (Hungary national football team) Willi Orbán
- (Hungary national football team) Bálint Vécsei
- (Iceland national football team) Mikael Egill Ellertsson
- (Iceland national football team) Arnór Ingvi Traustason
- (Iceland national football team) Davíð Kristján Ólafsson
- (Israel national football team) Gabi Kanichowsky
- (Israel national football team) Gadi Kinda
- (Israel national football team) Dor Peretz
- (Israel national football team) Raz Shlomo
- (Israel national football team) Manor Solomon
- (Italy national football team) Giacomo Bonaventura
- (Italy national football team) Matteo Darmian
- (Italy national football team) Stephan El Shaarawy
- (Italy national football team) Ciro Immobile
- (Italy national football team) Matteo Pessina
- (Italy national football team) Giacomo Raspadori
- (Italy national football team) Gianluca Scamacca
- (Kazakhstan national football team) Ramazan Orazov
- (Kosovo national football team) Muhamet Hyseni
- (Kosovo national football team) Altin Zeqiri
- (Kosovo national football team) Edon Zhegrova
- (Latvia national football team) Daniels Balodis
- (Latvia national football team) Eduards Emsis
- (Latvia national football team) Jānis Ikaunieks
- (Latvia national football team) Kristers Tobers
- (Liechtenstein national football team) Sandro Wolfinger
- (Lithuania national football team) Edvinas Girdvainis
- (Luxembourg national football team) Maxime Chanot
- (Luxembourg national football team) Mathias Olesen
- (Malta national football team) Paul Mbong
- (Malta national football team) Yannick Yankam
- (Moldova national football team) Vadim Rață
- (Montenegro national football team) Edvin Kuč
- (Montenegro national football team) Slobodan Rubežić
- (Netherlands national football team) Memphis Depay
- (Netherlands national football team) Marten de Roon
- (Netherlands national football team) Quilindschy Hartman
- (Netherlands national football team) Teun Koopmeiners
- (Netherlands national football team) Virgil van Dijk
- (Netherlands national football team) Mats Wieffer
- (North Macedonia national football team) Darko Churlinov
- (North Macedonia national football team) Jovan Manev
- (Northern Ireland national football team) Jonny Evans
- (Northern Ireland national football team) Josh Magennis
- (Northern Ireland national football team) Conor McMenamin
- (Northern Ireland national football team) Paul Smyth
- (Norway national football team) Fredrik Aursnes
- (Norway national football team) Aron Dønnum
- (Norway national football team) Mohamed Elyounoussi
- (Norway national football team) Martin Ødegaard
- (Norway national football team) Ola Solbakken
- (Norway national football team) Jørgen Strand Larsen
- (Poland national football team) Adam Buksa
- (Poland national football team) Przemysław Frankowski
- (Poland national football team) Arkadiusz Milik
- (Poland national football team) Damian Szymański
- (Poland national football team) Piotr Zieliński
- (Portugal national football team) Rafael Leão
- (Portugal national football team) Otávio
- (Republic of Ireland national football team) Nathan Collins
- (Republic of Ireland national football team) Matt Doherty
- (Republic of Ireland national football team) Callum Robinson
- (Romania national football team) Andrei Burcă
- (Romania national football team) Florinel Coman
- (Romania national football team) Dennis Man
- (Romania national football team) Răzvan Marin
- (Romania national football team) George Pușcaș
- (San Marino national football team) Filippo Berardi
- (San Marino national football team) Simone Franciosi
- (San Marino national football team) Alessandro Golinucci
- (Scotland national football team) Stuart Armstrong
- (Scotland national football team) Lyndon Dykes
- (Scotland national football team) Callum McGregor
- (Scotland national football team) Kenny McLean
- (Scotland national football team) Ryan Porteous
- (Scotland national football team) Lawrence Shankland
- (Serbia national football team) Srđan Babić
- (Serbia national football team) Darko Lazović
- (Serbia national football team) Strahinja Pavlović
- (Serbia national football team) Miloš Veljković
- (Slovakia national football team) Róbert Boženík
- (Slovakia national football team) Dávid Ďuriš
- (Slovakia national football team) Stanislav Lobotka
- (Slovakia national football team) Ľubomír Šatka
- (Slovakia national football team) Tomáš Suslov
- (Slovakia national football team) Denis Vavro
- (Slovenia national football team) David Brekalo
- (Slovenia national football team) Adam Gnezda Čerin
- (Slovenia national football team) Žan Karničnik
- (Slovenia national football team) Sandi Lovrić
- (Slovenia national football team) Jan Mlakar
- (Slovenia national football team) Benjamin Verbič
- (Spain national football team) Álex Baena
- (Spain national football team) Robin Le Normand
- (Spain national football team) Mikel Merino
- (Spain national football team) Mikel Oyarzabal
- (Spain national football team) Oihan Sancet
- (Spain national football team) Nico Williams
- (Sweden men's national football team) Anthony Elanga
- (Sweden men's national football team) Emil Holm
- (Sweden men's national football team) Alexander Isak
- (Sweden men's national football team) Jesper Karlsson
- (Sweden men's national football team) Dejan Kulusevski
- (Sweden men's national football team) Robin Quaison
- (Switzerland national football team) Manuel Akanji
- (Switzerland national football team) Cedric Itten
- (Switzerland national football team) Silvan Widmer
- (Turkey national football team) Yunus Akgün
- (Turkey national football team) Barış Alper Yılmaz
- (Turkey national football team) Abdülkerim Bardakcı
- (Turkey national football team) Arda Güler
- (Turkey national football team) İrfan Kahveci
- (Turkey national football team) Orkun Kökçü
- (Turkey national football team) Umut Nayir
- (Turkey national football team) Cengiz Ünder
- (Turkey national football team) Yusuf Yazıcı
- (Turkey national football team) Bertuğ Yıldırım
- (Ukraine national football team) Oleksandr Karavayev
- (Ukraine national football team) Yukhym Konoplya
- (Ukraine national football team) Heorhiy Sudakov
- (Ukraine national football team) Roman Yaremchuk
- (Ukraine national football team) Andriy Yarmolenko
- (Ukraine national football team) Illya Zabarnyi
- (Ukraine national football team) Oleksandr Zinchenko
- (Wales national football team) Nathan Broadhead
- (Wales national football team) Brennan Johnson
- (Wales national football team) Kieffer Moore
- (Wales national football team) Aaron Ramsey

1 own goal

- (Andorra national football team) Joan Cervós (against Israel)
- (Armenia national football team) Styopa Mkrtchyan (against Latvia)
- (Armenia national football team) Nair Tiknizyan (against Wales)
- (Azerbaijan national football team) Behlul Mustafazade (against Sweden)
- (Belgium national football team) Orel Mangala (against Austria)
- (Bosnia and Herzegovina national football team) Nihad Mujakić (against Luxembourg)
- (Bulgaria national football team) Aleks Petkov (against Hungary)
- (Estonia national football team) Karol Mets (against Poland)
- (Georgia national football team) Solomon Kvirkvelia (against Spain)
- (Georgia national football team) Luka Lochoshvili (against Spain)
- (Gibraltar national football team) Aymen Mouelhi (against France)
- (Gibraltar national football team) Ethan Santos (against France)
- (Hungary national football team) Attila Szalai (against Serbia)
- (Israel national football team) Eli Dasa (against Kosovo)
- (Kazakhstan national football team) Yerkin Tapalov (against Greece)
- (Liechtenstein national football team) Simon Lüchinger (against Bosnia and Herzegovina)
- (Malta national football team) Ferdinando Apap (against England)
- (Malta national football team) Ryan Camenzuli (against Ukraine)
- (Malta national football team) Enrico Pepe (against England)
- (North Macedonia national football team) Jani Atanasov (against England)
- (Northern Ireland national football team) Jonny Evans (against Slovenia)
- (Norway national football team) Leo Skiri Østigård (against Scotland)
- (San Marino national football team) Roberto Di Maio (against Slovenia)
- (Slovakia national football team) Patrik Hrošovský (against Bosnia and Herzegovina)
- (Turkey national football team) Ozan Kabak (against Armenia)
- (Ukraine national football team) Mykola Matviyenko (against Bosnia and Herzegovina)

== Overall ranking ==
The overall rankings were used for seeding in the final tournament draw. Results against sixth-placed teams were not considered in the ranking.

Rnk	Grp	Team	Pld	W	D	L	GF	GA	GD	Pts	Allocation
1	J	Portugal	8	8	0	0	30	2	+28	24	Draw pot 1
2	B	France	8	7	1	0	29	3	+26	22	Draw pot 1
3	A	Spain	8	7	0	1	25	5	+20	21	Draw pot 1
4	F	Belgium	8	6	2	0	22	4	+18	20 (Note: Goals scored away from home: Belgium 10, England 8.)	Draw pot 1
5	C	England	8	6	2	0	22	4	+18	20	Draw pot 1
6	G	Hungary	8	5	3	0	16	7	+9	18	Draw pot 2
7	D	Turkey	8	5	2	1	14	7	+7	17	Draw pot 2
8	I	Romania	8	4	4	0	10	5	+5	16	Draw pot 2
9	H	Denmark	8	5	1	2	13	9	+4	16	Draw pot 2
10	E	Albania	8	4	3	1	12	4	+8	15	Draw pot 2
11	F	Austria	8	6	1	1	17	7	+10	19	Draw pot 2
12	B	Netherlands	8	6	0	2	17	7	+10	18	Draw pot 3
13	A	Scotland	8	5	2	1	17	8	+9	17	Draw pot 3
14	D	Croatia	8	5	1	2	13	4	+9	16	Draw pot 3
15	H	Slovenia	8	5	1	2	14	9	+5	16	Draw pot 3
16	J	Slovakia	8	5	1	2	13	8	+5	16	Draw pot 3
17	E	Czech Republic	8	4	3	1	12	6	+6	15	Draw pot 3
18	C	Italy	8	4	2	2	16	9	+7	14	Draw pot 4
19	G	Serbia	8	4	2	2	15	9	+6	14	Draw pot 4
20	I	Switzerland	8	2	5	1	17	10	+7	11	Draw pot 4
21	C	Ukraine	8	4	2	2	11	8	+3	14	
22	B	Greece	8	4	1	3	14	8	+6	13	
23	H	Finland	8	4	0	4	10	9	+1	12	
24	D	Wales	8	3	3	2	10	10	0	12	
25	A	Norway	8	3	2	3	14	12	+2	11	
26	E	Poland	8	3	2	3	10	10	0	11	
27	G	Montenegro	8	3	2	3	9	11	−2	11	
28	J	Luxembourg	8	3	2	3	10	19	−9	11	
29	F	Sweden	8	3	1	4	14	12	+2	10	
30	I	Israel	8	2	3	3	7	10	−3	9	
31	H	Kazakhstan	8	4	0	4	10	11	−1	12	
32	E	Moldova	8	2	4	2	7	10	−3	10	
33	D	Armenia	8	2	2	4	9	11	−2	8	
34	A	Georgia	8	2	2	4	12	18	−6	8	
35	I	Belarus	8	2	2	4	8	14	−6	8	
36	C	North Macedonia	8	2	2	4	10	20	−10	8	
37	F	Azerbaijan	8	2	1	5	7	17	−10	7	
38	B	Republic of Ireland	8	2	0	6	9	10	−1	6	
39	G	Lithuania	8	1	3	4	8	14	−6	6	
40	J	Iceland	8	1	1	6	7	16	−9	4	
41	I	Kosovo	8	1	4	3	6	9	−3	7	
42	G	Bulgaria	8	0	4	4	7	14	−7	4	
43	H	Northern Ireland	8	1	0	7	4	13	−9	3	
44	J	Bosnia and Herzegovina	8	1	0	7	5	19	−14	3 (Note: Fair play points: Bosnia and Herzegovina −20, Latvia −29.)	
45	D	Latvia	8	1	0	7	5	19	−14	3	
46	E	Faroe Islands	8	0	2	6	2	13	−11	2	
47	F	Estonia	8	0	1	7	2	22	−20	1	
48	C	Malta	8	0	0	8	2	20	−18	0	
49	A	Cyprus	8	0	0	8	3	28	−25	0	
50	B	Gibraltar	8	0	0	8	0	41	−41	0	
51	I	Andorra	10	0	2	8	3	20	−17	2	
52	J	Liechtenstein	10	0	0	10	1	28	−27	0	
53	H	San Marino	10	0	0	10	3	31	−28	0	

Source: UEFA
Rules for classification: Ranking criteria
