= Belgium national football team results (2020–present) =

- Win Draw Loss

In the 2020s, the Belgium national football team played at the UEFA Euro 2020, 2021 UEFA Nations League Finals, 2022 FIFA World Cup, UEFA Euro 2024 and 2026 FIFA World Cup.

== Results ==
Legend for encounters
World Cup	FIFA World Cup
Euro	UEFA European Championship
Nations League	UEFA Nations League
Q	Qualification rounds
PO	Play-offs
GS	Group stage
R32	Round of 32
R16	Round of 16 (eighth-finals)
QF	Quarter-final
SF	Semi-final
3rd	Third place match
F	Final

87 official matches played (as of 15 November 2026):

=== 2020 ===
27 March 2020 Qatar Airways International Tournament	Belgium	Cancelled	Portugal	Ar-Rayyan, Qatar
		Report		Stadium: Education City Stadium
Note: Cancelled due to the COVID-19 pandemic.

30 March 2020 Qatar Airways International Tournament	Switzerland	Cancelled	Belgium	Ar-Rayyan, Qatar
		Report		Stadium: Education City Stadium
Note: Cancelled due to the COVID-19 pandemic.

5 September 2020 2020–21 Nations League A	Denmark	0–2	Belgium	Copenhagen, Denmark
20:45		Report	Denayer 9'; Mertens 77'	Stadium: Parken Stadium; Attendance: 0 (Note: Due to the COVID-19 pandemic in Europe, all matches scheduled for September 2020 were played behind closed doors.); Referee: Sandro Schärer (Switzerland)

8 September 2020 2020–21 Nations League A	Belgium	5–1	Iceland	Brussels, Belgium
20:45	Witsel 13'; Batshuayi 17', 69'; Mertens 50'; Doku 80'	Report	Friðjónsson 11'	Stadium: King Baudouin Stadium; Attendance: 0 Referee: Paweł Raczkowski (Poland)

8 October 2020 Friendly	Belgium	1–1	Ivory Coast	Brussels, Belgium
20:45	Batshuayi 54'	Report	Kessié 87' (pen.)	Stadium: King Baudouin Stadium; Attendance: 7,000; Referee: Serdar Gözübüyük (Netherlands)

11 October 2020 2020–21 Nations League A	England	2–1	Belgium	London, England
18:00	Rashford 39' (pen.); Mount 65'	Report	Lukaku 16' (pen.)	Stadium: Wembley Stadium; Attendance: 0 (Note: Due to the COVID-19 pandemic in the United Kingdom, England played their home matches behind closed doors.); Referee: Tobias Stieler (Germany)

14 October 2020 2020–21 Nations League A	Iceland	1–2	Belgium	Reykjavík, Iceland
20:45	Sævarsson 17'	Report	Lukaku 9', 38' (pen.)	Stadium: Laugardalsvöllur; Attendance: 60; Referee: Andris Treimanis (Latvia)

11 November 2020 Friendly	Belgium	2–1	Switzerland	Leuven, Belgium
20:45	Batshuayi 49', 70'	Report	Mehmedi 12'	Stadium: Den Dreef; Attendance: 0 Referee: Jérôme Brisard (France)

15 November 2020 2020–21 Nations League A	Belgium	2–0	England	Leuven, Belgium
20:45	Tielemans 10'; Mertens 23'	Report		Stadium: Den Dreef; Attendance: 0 (Note: Due to the COVID-19 pandemic in Europe, the match was played behind closed doors.); Referee: Danny Makkelie (Netherlands)

18 November 2020 2020–21 Nations League A	Belgium	4–2	Denmark	Leuven, Belgium
20:45	Tielemans 3'; Lukaku 57', 69'; De Bruyne 87'	Report	Wind 17'; Chadli 86' (o.g.)	Stadium: Den Dreef; Attendance: 0 Referee: Slavko Vinčić (Slovenia)

=== 2021 ===
24 March 2021 2022 World Cup Q	Belgium	3–1	Wales	Leuven, Belgium
20:45	De Bruyne 22'; T. Hazard 28'; Lukaku 73' (pen.)	Report	Wilson 11'	Stadium: Den Dreef; Attendance: 0 Referee: Cüneyt Çakır (Turkey)

27 March 2021 2022 World Cup Q	Czech Republic	1–1	Belgium	Prague, Czech Republic
20:45	Provod 50'	Report	Lukaku 60'	Stadium: Eden Arena; Attendance: 0 Referee: Willie Collum (Scotland)

30 March 2021 2022 World Cup Q	Belgium	8–0	Belarus	Leuven, Belgium
20:45	Batshuayi 14'; Vanaken 17', 89'; Trossard 38', 75'; Doku 42'; Praet 49'; Benteke 70'	Report		Stadium: Den Dreef; Attendance: 0 Referee: Donatas Rumšas (Lithuania)

3 June 2021 Friendly	Belgium	1–1	Greece	Brussels, Belgium
20:45	T. Hazard 20'	Report	Tzavellas 66'	Stadium: King Baudouin Stadium; Attendance: 0 Referee: Robert Hennessy (Ireland)

6 June 2021 Friendly	Belgium	1–0	Croatia	Brussels, Belgium
20:45	Lukaku 38'	Report		Stadium: King Baudouin Stadium; Attendance: 50; Referee: Deniz Aytekin (Germany)

12 June 2021 Euro 2020 GS	Belgium	3–0	Russia	Saint Petersburg, Russia
22:00	Lukaku 10', 88'; Meunier 34'	Report		Stadium: Krestovsky Stadium; Attendance: 26,264; Referee: Antonio Mateu Lahoz (Spain)

17 June 2021 Euro 2020 GS	Denmark	1–2	Belgium	Copenhagen, Denmark
18:00	Poulsen 2'	Report	T. Hazard 55'; De Bruyne 70'	Stadium: Parken Stadium; Attendance: 23,395; Referee: Björn Kuipers (Netherlands)

21 June 2021 Euro 2020 GS	Finland	0–2	Belgium	Saint Petersburg, Russia
21:00		Report	Hradecky 74' (o.g.); Lukaku 81'	Stadium: Krestovsky Stadium; Attendance: 18,545; Referee: Felix Brych (Germany)

27 June 2021 Euro 2020 R16	Belgium	1–0	Portugal	Seville, Spain
21:00	T. Hazard 42'	Report		Stadium: La Cartuja; Attendance: 11,504; Referee: Felix Brych (Germany)

2 July 2021 Euro 2020 QF	Belgium	1–2	Italy	Munich, Germany
21:00	Lukaku 45+2' (pen.)	Report	Barella 31'; Insigne 44'	Stadium: Allianz Arena; Attendance: 12,984; Referee: Slavko Vinčić (Slovenia)

2 September 2021 2022 World Cup Q	Estonia	2–5	Belgium	Tallinn, Estonia
20:45	Käit 2'; Sorga 83'	Report	Vanaken 22'; Lukaku 29', 52'; Witsel 65'; Foket 76'	Stadium: A. Le Coq Arena; Attendance: 6,685; Referee: Guillermo Cuadra Fernández (Spain)

5 September 2021 2022 World Cup Q	Belgium	3–0	Czech Republic	Brussels, Belgium
20:45	Lukaku 8'; E. Hazard 41'; Saelemaekers 65'	Report		Stadium: King Baudouin Stadium; Attendance: 21,416; Referee: Michael Oliver (England)

8 September 2021 2022 World Cup Q	Belarus	0–1	Belgium	Kazan, Russia
20:45		Report	Praet 33'	Stadium: Central Stadium; Attendance: 0 Referee: Paweł Raczkowski (Poland)

7 October 2021 2021 Nations League SF	Belgium	2–3	France	Turin, Italy
20:45	Carrasco 37'; Lukaku 40'	Report	Benzema 62'; Mbappé 69' (pen.); T. Hernandez 90'	Stadium: Juventus Stadium; Attendance: 12,409; Referee: Daniel Siebert (Germany)

10 October 2021 2021 Nations League 3rd	Italy	2–1	Belgium	Turin, Italy
15:00	Barella 46'; Berardi 65' (pen.)	Report	De Ketelaere 86'	Stadium: Juventus Stadium; Attendance: 16,724; Referee: Srđan Jovanović (Serbia)

13 November 2021 2022 World Cup Q	Belgium	3–1	Estonia	Brussels, Belgium
20:45	Benteke 11'; Carrasco 53'; T. Hazard 74'	Report	Sorga 70'	Stadium: King Baudouin Stadium; Attendance: 29,865; Referee: Halil Umut Meler (Turkey)

16 November 2021 2022 World Cup Q	Wales	1–1	Belgium	Cardiff, Wales
20:45	Moore 32'	Report	De Bruyne 12'	Stadium: Cardiff City Stadium; Attendance: 32,343; Referee: Artur Soares Dias (Portugal)

=== 2022 ===
26 March 2022 Friendly	Republic of Ireland	2–2	Belgium	Dublin, Ireland
18:00	Ogbene 35'; Browne 85'	Report	Batshuayi 12'; Vanaken 58'	Stadium: Aviva Stadium; Attendance: 48,808; Referee: Nick Walsh (Scotland)

29 March 2022 Friendly	Belgium	3–0	Burkina Faso	Anderlecht, Belgium
20:45	Vanaken 16'; Trossard 45'; Benteke 75'	Report		Stadium: Constant Vanden Stock Stadium; Attendance: 15,000; Referee: Dennis Higler (Netherlands)

3 June 2022 2022–23 Nations League A	Belgium	1–4	Netherlands	Brussels, Belgium
20:45	Batshuayi 90+3'	Report	Bergwijn 40'; Depay 51', 66'; Dumfries 62'	Stadium: King Baudouin Stadium; Attendance: 38,327; Referee: José María Sánchez (Spain)

8 June 2022 2022–23 Nations League A	Belgium	6–1	Poland	Brussels, Belgium
20:45	Witsel 42'; De Bruyne 59'; Trossard 73', 80'; Dendoncker 84'; Openda 90+3'	Report	Lewandowski 28'	Stadium: King Baudouin Stadium; Attendance: 27,409; Referee: Ivan Kružliak (Slovakia)

11 June 2022 2022–23 Nations League A	Wales	1–1	Belgium	Cardiff, Wales
20:45	Johnson 86'	Report	Tielemans 51'	Stadium: Cardiff City Stadium; Attendance: 27,188; Referee: Benoît Bastien (France)

14 June 2022 2022–23 Nations League A	Poland	0–1	Belgium	Warsaw, Poland
20:45		Report	Batshuayi 16'	Stadium: Stadion Narodowy; Attendance: 56,803; Referee: Irfan Peljto (Bosnia and Herzegovina)

22 September 2022 2022–23 Nations League A	Belgium	2–1	Wales	Brussels, Belgium
20:45	De Bruyne 10'; Batshuayi 37'	Report	Moore 50'	Stadium: King Baudouin Stadium; Attendance: 28,463; Referee: Ali Palabıyık (Turkey)

25 September 2022 2022–23 Nations League A	Netherlands	1–0	Belgium	Amsterdam, Netherlands
20:45	Van Dijk 73'	Report		Stadium: Johan Cruyff Arena; Attendance: 52,314; Referee: Anthony Taylor (England)

18 November 2022 Friendly	Egypt	2–1	Belgium	Kuwait City, Kuwait
16:00	M. Mohamed 33'; Trézéguet 46'	Report	Openda 76'	Stadium: Jaber Al-Ahmad International Stadium; Attendance: 57,400; Referee: Ali Shaban (Kuwait)

23 November 2022 2022 World Cup GS	Belgium	1–0	Canada	Al Rayyan, Qatar
22:00 UTC+3	Batshuayi 44'	Report		Stadium: Ahmad bin Ali Stadium; Attendance: 40,432; Referee: Janny Sikazwe (Zambia)

27 November 2022 2022 World Cup GS	Belgium	0–2	Morocco	Doha, Qatar
16:00 UTC+3		Report	Saïss 73'; Aboukhlal 90+2'	Stadium: Al Thumama Stadium; Attendance: 43,738; Referee: César Arturo Ramos (Mexico)

1 December 2022 2022 World Cup GS	Croatia	0–0	Belgium	Al Rayyan, Qatar
18:00 UTC+3		Report		Stadium: Ahmad bin Ali Stadium; Attendance: 43,984; Referee: Anthony Taylor (England)

=== 2023 ===
24 March 2023 Euro 2024 Q	Sweden	0–3	Belgium	Solna, Sweden
20:45		Report	Lukaku 35', 49', 83'	Stadium: Friends Arena; Attendance: 49,296; Referee: Orel Grinfeld (Israel)

28 March 2023 Friendly	Germany	2–3	Belgium	Cologne, Germany
20:45	Füllkrug 44' (pen.); Gnabry 87'	Report	Carrasco 6'; Lukaku 9'; De Bruyne 78'	Stadium: RheinEnergieStadion; Attendance: 42,910; Referee: Willy Delajod (France)

17 June 2023 Euro 2024 Q	Belgium	1–1	Austria	Brussels, Belgium
20:45	Lukaku 61'	Report	Gregoritsch 21'	Stadium: King Baudouin Stadium; Attendance: 39,237; Referee: Jérôme Brisard (France)

20 June 2023 Euro 2024 Q	Estonia	0–3	Belgium	Tallinn, Estonia
20:45		Report	Lukaku 37', 40'; Bakayoko 90'	Stadium: Lilleküla Stadium; Attendance: 11,772; Referee: John Beaton (Scotland)

9 September 2023 Euro 2024 Q	Azerbaijan	0–1	Belgium	Baku, Azerbaijan
15:00		Report	Carrasco 38'	Stadium: Dalga Arena; Attendance: 4,500; Referee: Nenad Minaković (Serbia)

12 September 2023 Euro 2024 Q	Belgium	5–0	Estonia	Brussels, Belgium
20:45	Vertonghen 4'; Trossard 18'; Lukaku 56', 58'; De Ketelaere 88'	Report		Stadium: King Baudouin Stadium; Attendance: 24,127; Referee: Bartosz Frankowski (Poland)

13 October 2023 Euro 2024 Q	Austria	2–3	Belgium	Vienna, Austria
20:45	Laimer 72'; Sabitzer 84' (pen.)	Report	Lukebakio 12', 55'; Lukaku 58'	Stadium: Ernst-Happel-Stadion; Attendance: 47,000; Referee: Jesús Gil Manzano (Spain)

16 October 2023 Euro 2024 Q	Belgium	1–1 (Note: Abandoned but result validated by UEFA)	Sweden	Brussels, Belgium
20:45	Lukaku 31' (pen.)	Report	Gyökeres 15'	Stadium: King Baudouin Stadium; Attendance: 35,000; Referee: Maurizio Mariani (Italy)
Note: The match was abandoned at half-time with the score 1–1 due to security reasons, after two Swedish supporters were killed in a terrorist shooting in Brussels. On 19 October 2023, UEFA decided that the half-time score would be considered final and the match would not be resumed.

15 November 2023 Friendly	Belgium	1–0	Serbia	Leuven, Belgium
20:45	Carrasco 2'	Report		Stadium: Den Dreef; Attendance: 0 Referee: Marian Barbu (Romania)

19 November 2023 Euro 2024 Q	Belgium	5–0	Azerbaijan	Brussels, Belgium
18:00	Lukaku 17', 26', 30', 37'; Trossard 90'	Report		Stadium: King Baudouin Stadium; Attendance: 30,276; Referee: Gergő Bogár (Hungary)

=== 2024 ===
23 March 2024 Friendly	Republic of Ireland	0–0	Belgium	Dublin, Ireland
19:45 GMT	Ferguson (penalty missed) 28'	Report		Stadium: Aviva Stadium; Attendance: 38,128; Referee: Rohit Saggi (Norway)

26 March 2024 Friendly	England	2–2	Belgium	London, England
19:45 GMT	Toney 17' (pen.); Bellingham 90+5'	Report	Tielemans 11', 36'	Stadium: Wembley Stadium; Attendance: 80,733; Referee: Sebastian Gishamer (Austria)

5 June 2024 Friendly	Belgium	2–0	Montenegro	Brussels, Belgium
20:45 CET	De Bruyne 44'; Trossard 90+3' (pen.)	Report		Stadium: King Baudouin Stadium; Attendance: 19,246; Referee: Kristoffer Karlsson (Sweden)

8 June 2024 Friendly	Belgium	3–0	Luxembourg	Brussels, Belgium
20:00 CET	Lukaku 42' (pen.), 57'; Trossard 81'	Report		Stadium: King Baudouin Stadium; Attendance: 35,287; Referee: Paweł Raczkowski (Poland)

17 June 2024 Euro 2024 GS	Belgium	0–1	Slovakia	Frankfurt, Germany
18:00 CEST		Report	Schranz 7'	Stadium: Waldstadion; Attendance: 45,181; Referee: Halil Umut Meler (Turkey)

22 June 2024 Euro 2024 GS	Belgium	2–0	Romania	Cologne, Germany
21:00 CET	Tielemans 2'; De Bruyne 80'	Report		Stadium: RheinEnergieStadion; Attendance: 42,535; Referee: Szymon Marciniak (Poland)

26 June 2024 Euro 2024 GS	Ukraine	0–0	Belgium	Stuttgart, Germany
21:00 CET		Report		Stadium: MHPArena; Attendance: 54,000; Referee: Anthony Taylor (England)

1 July 2024 Euro 2024 R16	France	1–0	Belgium	Düsseldorf, Germany
18:00 CET	Vertonghen 85' (o.g.)	Report		Stadium: Merkur Spiel-Arena; Attendance: 46,810; Referee: Glenn Nyberg (Sweden)

6 September 2024 2024–25 Nations League A	Belgium	3–1	Israel	Brussels, Belgium
20:45	De Bruyne 21', 52' (pen.); Tielemans 48'	Report	Castagne 36' (o.g.)	Stadium: King Baudouin Stadium; Attendance: 0 Referee: Michael Oliver (England)

9 September 2024 2024–25 Nations League A	France	2–0	Belgium	Lyon, France
20:45	Muani 29'; Dembélé 57'	Report		Stadium: Parc Olympique Lyonnais; Attendance: 42,358; Referee: Tobias Stieler (Germany)

10 October 2024 2024–25 Nations League A	Italy	2–2	Belgium	Rome, Italy
20:45	Cambiaso 1'; Retegui 24'; Pellegrini (red card) 40'	Report	De Cuyper 42'; Trossard 61'	Stadium: Stadio Olimpico; Attendance: 44,297; Referee: Espen Eskås (Norway)

14 October 2024 2024–25 Nations League A	Belgium	1–2	France	Brussels, Belgium
20:45	Tielemans (penalty missed) 23'; Openda 45+3'	Report	Muani 35' (pen.), 62'; Tchouaméni (yellow card) 24' (yellow-red card) 76'	Stadium: King Baudouin Stadium; Attendance: 39,731; Referee: Irfan Peljto (Bosnia & Herzegovina)

14 November 2024 2024–25 Nations League A	Belgium	0–1	Italy	Brussels, Belgium
20:45		Report	Tonali 11'	Stadium: King Baudouin Stadium; Attendance: 41,367; Referee: Radu Petrescu (Romania)

17 November 2024 2024–25 Nations League A	Israel	1–0	Belgium	Budapest, Hungary (Note: Due to the Gaza war, Israel are required to play their home matches at neutral venues until further notice.)
20:45	Shua 86'	Report		Stadium: Bozsik Aréna; Attendance: 675; Referee: Sebastian Gishamer (Austria)

=== 2025 ===
20 March 2025 2024–25 Nations League PO	Ukraine	3–1	Belgium	Murcia, Spain (Note: Due to the Russian invasion of Ukraine, Ukraine were required to play their home matches at neutral venues.)
20:45	Hutsulyak 66'; Vanat 73'; Zabarnyi 78'	Report	Lukaku 40'	Stadium: Nueva Condomina; Attendance: 8,767; Referee: Sandro Schärer (Switzerland)

23 March 2025 2024–25 Nations League PO	Belgium	3–0 (4–3 agg.)	Ukraine	Genk, Belgium
20:45	De Cuyper 70'; Lukaku 75', 86'	Report		Stadium: Cegeka Arena; Attendance: 19,446; Referee: Daniel Siebert (Germany)

6 June 2025 2026 World Cup Q	North Macedonia	1–1	Belgium	Skopje, North Macedonia
20:45	Alioski 86'	Report	De Cuyper 28'	Stadium: Toše Proeski Arena; Attendance: 23,070; Referee: Chris Kavanagh (England)

9 June 2025 2026 World Cup Q	Belgium	4–3	Wales	Brussels, Belgium
20:45	Lukaku 15' (pen.); Tielemans 19'; Doku 28'; De Bruyne 88'	Report	Wilson 45+7' (pen.); Thomas 52'; Johnson 70'	Stadium: King Baudouin Stadium; Attendance: 33,653; Referee: Irfan Peljto (Bosnia and Herzegovina)

4 September 2025 2026 World Cup Q	Liechtenstein	0–6	Belgium	Vaduz, Liechtenstein
20:45		Report	De Cuyper 29'; Tielemans 46', 70' (pen.); Theate 60'; De Bruyne 62'; Fofana 90+1'	Stadium: Rheinpark Stadion; Attendance: 3,158; Referee: Morten Krogh (Denmark)

7 September 2025 2026 World Cup Q	Belgium	6–0	Kazakhstan	Anderlecht, Belgium
20:45	De Bruyne 42', 84'; Doku 44', 60'; Raskin 51'; Meunier 87'	Report		Stadium: Constant Vanden Stock Stadium; Attendance: 15,119; Referee: Radu Petrescu (Romania)

10 October 2025 2026 World Cup Q	Belgium	0–0	North Macedonia	Ghent, Belgium
20:45		Report		Stadium: Planet Group Arena; Attendance: 18,583; Referee: Halil Umut Meler (Turkey)

13 October 2025 2026 World Cup Q	Wales	2–4	Belgium	Cardiff, Wales
19:45	Rodon 8'; Broadhead 89'	Report	De Bruyne 18' (pen.), 76' (pen.); Meunier 24'; Trossard 90'	Stadium: Cardiff City Stadium; Attendance: 32,803; Referee: Daniel Siebert (Germany)

15 November 2025 2026 World Cup Q	Kazakhstan	1–1	Belgium	Astana, Kazakhstan
19:00	Satpayev 9'	Report	Vanaken 48'	Stadium: Astana Arena; Attendance: 28,012; Referee: Donatas Rumšas (Lithuania)

18 November 2025 2026 World Cup Q	Belgium	7–0	Liechtenstein	Liège, Belgium
20:45	Vanaken 3'; Doku 34', 41'; Mechele 52'; Saelemaekers 55'; De Ketelaere 57', 59'	Report		Stadium: Stade Maurice Dufrasne; Attendance: 26,253; Referee: Mohammed Al-Hakim (Sweden)

=== 2026 ===
28 March 2026 Friendly	United States	2–5	Belgium	Atlanta, United States
15:30 (UTC-4)	McKennie 39'; Agyemang 87'	Report	Debast 45'; Onana 53'; De Ketelaere 59' (pen.); Lukébakio 68', 82'	Stadium: Mercedes-Benz Stadium; Attendance: 66,867; Referee: Esteban Ostojich (Uruguay)

31 March 2026 Friendly	Mexico	1–1	Belgium	Chicago, United States
20:00 (UTC-5)	J. Sánchez 19'	Report	Lukébakio 47'	Stadium: Soldier Field; Attendance: 52,412; Referee: Rosendo Mendoza (United States)

2 June 2026 Friendly	Croatia	0–2	Belgium	Rijeka, Croatia
18:00		Report	Tielemans 38'; Lukaku 90+6'	Stadium: Stadion Rujevica; Attendance: 7,555; Referee: Rade Obrenović (Slovenia)

6 June 2026 Friendly	Belgium	5–0	Tunisia	Brussels, Belgium
15:00	Trossard 28'; De Ketelaere 53'; De Bruyne 65'; Lukébakio 85'; Raskin 87'	Report		Stadium: King Baudouin Stadium; Attendance: 40,236; Referee: Anastasios Sidiropoulos (Greece)

15 June 2026 2026 World Cup GS	Belgium	1–1	Egypt	Seattle, United States
12:00 (UTC-7)	Hany 66' (o.g.)	Report	Ashour 20'	Stadium: Lumen Field; Attendance: 66,775; Referee: Ramon Abatti (Brazil)

21 June 2026 2026 World Cup GS	Belgium	0–0	Iran	Inglewood, United States
12:00 (UTC-7)	Ngoy (red card) 66'	Report		Stadium: SoFi Stadium; Attendance: 70,317; Referee: Darío Herrera (Argentina)

26 June 2026 2026 World Cup GS	New Zealand	1–5	Belgium	Vancouver, Canada
20:00 (UTC−7)	Just 84'	Report	Trossard 28', 50'; De Bruyne 66'; Lukaku 86'; Saelemaekers 90+4'	Stadium: BC Place; Attendance: 52,497; Referee: Adham Makhadmeh (Jordan)

1 July 2026 2026 World Cup R32	Belgium	3–2 (a.e.t.)	Senegal	Seattle, United States
13:00 (UTC−7)	Lukaku 86'; Tielemans 89', 120+5' (pen.)	Report	Diarra 24'; Sarr 51'	Stadium: Lumen Field; Attendance: 66,925; Referee: Saíd Martínez (Honduras)

6 July 2026 2026 World Cup R16	United States	1–4	Belgium	Seattle, United States
17:00 (UTC−7)	Tillman 31'	Report	De Ketelaere 9', 33'; Vanaken 57'; Lukaku 90+3'	Stadium: Lumen Field; Attendance: 66,925; Referee: Adham Makhadmeh (Jordan)

10 July 2026 2026 World Cup QF	Spain	2–1	Belgium	Inglewood, United States
12:00 (UTC−7)	Ruiz 30'; Merino 88'	Report	De Ketelaere 41'	Stadium: SoFi Stadium; Attendance: 70,492; Referee: Michael Oliver (England)

25 September 2026 2026–27 Nations League A	Italy	0–2	Belgium	Rome, Italy
20:45 (UTC+2)		Report	Godts 20'; Lukébakio 69'	Stadium: Stadio Olimpico; Attendance: 47,155; Referee: Daniel Siebert (Germany)

28 September 2026 2026–27 Nations League A	Belgium	0–1	France	Brussels, Belgium
20:45 (UTC+2)		Report	Olise 88'	Stadium: King Baudouin Stadium; Attendance: 40,857; Referee: Rade Obrenovič (Slovenia)

2 October 2026 2026–27 Nations League A	Belgium	3–0	Turkey	Liege, Belgium
20:45 (UTC+2)	De Bruyne 10', 60'; Lukaku 76'	Report		Stadium: Stade Maurice Dufrasne; Attendance: 24,386; Referee: Rohit Saggi (Norway)

5 October 2026 2026–27 Nations League A	France	4–1	Belgium	Saint-Denis, France
20:45 (UTC+2)	Doué 77'; Cherki 81'; Olise 88', 90+1'	Report	Lukébakio 35'	Stadium: Stade de France; Attendance: 75,389; Referee: Nick Walsh (Scotland)

12 November 2026 2026–27 Nations League A	Turkey	1–2	Belgium	İzmir, Turkey
20:00 (UTC+3)	Güler 20'	Report	De Bruyne 27'; De Ketelaere 30'	Stadium: Gürsel Aksel Stadium; Attendance: 19,697; Referee: Sandro Schärer (Switzerland)

15 November 2026 2026–27 Nations League A	Belgium	4–1	Italy	Brussels, Belgium
20:45 (UTC+1)	De Cuyper 15'; Ngoy 22'; Doku 26'; Moreira 80'	Report	Esposito 11'	Stadium: King Baudouin Stadium; Attendance: 42,842; Referee: Espen Eskås (Norway)
