= UEFA Euro 2024 qualifying Group F =

Group F of UEFA Euro 2024 qualifying was one of the ten groups to decide which teams would qualify for the UEFA Euro 2024 final tournament in Germany. Group F consisted of five teams: Austria, Azerbaijan, Belgium, Estonia, and Sweden. The teams played against each other home-and-away in a round-robin format.

The top two teams, Belgium and Austria, qualified directly for the final tournament. The participants of the qualifying play-offs were decided based on their performance in the 2022–23 UEFA Nations League.

Belgian striker Romelu Lukaku broke the record for most goals scored in a UEFA Euro qualifying campaign, with fourteen.

== Standings ==
Pos	Team	Pld	W	D	L	GF	GA	GD	Pts	Qualification	(Belgium)	(Austria)	(Sweden)	(Azerbaijan)	(Estonia)
1	Belgium	8	6	2	0	22	4	+18	20	Qualify for final tournament	—	1–1	1–1 (Note: The Belgium v Sweden match was abandoned at 1–1 at half-time for security reasons, as two Swedish supporters had been killed in a terrorist shooting in Brussels prior to the match; the score was later confirmed as final.)	5–0	5–0
2	Austria	8	6	1	1	17	7	+10	19	Qualify for final tournament	2–3	—	2–0	4–1	2–1
3	Sweden	8	3	1	4	14	12	+2	10		0–3	1–3	—	5–0	2–0
4	Azerbaijan	8	2	1	5	7	17	−10	7		0–1	0–1	3–0	—	1–1
5	Estonia	8	0	1	7	2	22	−20	1	Advance to play-offs via Nations League	0–3	0–2	0–5	0–2	—

Source: UEFA
Rules for classification: Qualification tiebreakers

== Matches ==
The fixture list was confirmed by UEFA on 10 October 2022, the day after the draw. Times are CET/CEST, (Note: CET (UTC+1) for matches until 25 March and from 29 October (matchday 1 and 9–10), and CEST (UTC+2) for matches from 26 March to 28 October 2023 (matchday 2–8).) as listed by UEFA (local times, if different, are in parentheses).

24 March 2023
20:45

Austria	4–1	Azerbaijan
Sabitzer 27', 50'; Gregoritsch 29'; Baumgartner 69'	Report	Mahmudov 64'

Raiffeisen Arena, Linz
Attendance: 16,500
Referee: Bartosz Frankowski (Poland)
24 March 2023
20:45

Sweden	0–3	Belgium
	Report	Lukaku 35', 49', 83'

Friends Arena, Solna
Attendance: 49,296
Referee: Orel Grinfeld (Israel)

27 March 2023
20:45

Austria	2–1	Estonia
Kainz 68'; Gregoritsch 88'	Report	Sappinen 25'

Raiffeisen Arena, Linz
Attendance: 16,500
Referee: Enea Jorgji (Albania)
27 March 2023
20:45

Sweden	5–0	Azerbaijan
Forsberg 38'; Mustafazade 65' (o.g.); Gyökeres 79'; Karlsson 88'; Elanga 89'	Report

Friends Arena, Solna
Attendance: 23,674
Referee: Stéphanie Frappart (France)

17 June 2023
18:00 (20:00 UTC+4)

Azerbaijan	1–1	Estonia
Kryvotsyuk 62'	Report	Sappinen 27'

Dalga Arena, Baku
Attendance: 3,900
Referee: Ondřej Berka (Czech Republic)
17 June 2023
20:45

Belgium	1–1	Austria
Lukaku 62'	Report	Mangala 21' (o.g.)

King Baudouin Stadium, Brussels
Attendance: 39,237
Referee: Jérôme Brisard (France)

20 June 2023
20:45

Austria	2–0	Sweden
Baumgartner 81', 89'	Report

Ernst-Happel-Stadion, Vienna
Attendance: 46,300
Referee: Marco Guida (Italy)
20 June 2023
20:45 (21:45 UTC+3)

Estonia	0–3	Belgium
	Report	Lukaku 37', 40'; Bakayoko 90'

Lilleküla Stadium, Tallinn
Attendance: 11,772
Referee: John Beaton (Scotland)

9 September 2023
15:00 (17:00 UTC+4)

Azerbaijan	0–1	Belgium
	Report	Carrasco 38'

Dalga Arena, Baku
Attendance: 4,500
Referee: Nenad Minaković (Serbia)
9 September 2023
18:00 (19:00 UTC+3)

Estonia	0–5	Sweden
	Report	Gyökeres 18'; Kulusevski 24'; Isak 39'; Quaison 75'; Claesson 90+2'

Lilleküla Stadium, Tallinn
Attendance: 11,411
Referee: Horațiu Feșnic (Romania)

12 September 2023
20:45

Belgium	5–0	Estonia
Vertonghen 4'; Trossard 18'; Lukaku 56', 58'; De Ketelaere 88'	Report

King Baudouin Stadium, Brussels
Attendance: 24,127
Referee: Bartosz Frankowski (Poland)
12 September 2023
20:45

Sweden	1–3	Austria
Holm 90'	Report	Gregoritsch 53'; Arnautović 56', 69' (pen.)

Friends Arena, Solna
Attendance: 43,228
Referee: Serdar Gözübüyük (Netherlands)

13 October 2023
18:00 (19:00 UTC+3)

Estonia	0–2	Azerbaijan
	Report	Bayramov 9'; Sheydayev 45+4' (pen.)

Lilleküla Stadium, Tallinn
Attendance: 5,652
Referee: Robert Schröder (Germany)
13 October 2023
20:45

Austria	2–3	Belgium
Laimer 72'; Sabitzer 84' (pen.)	Report	Lukébakio 12', 55'; Lukaku 58'

Ernst-Happel-Stadion, Vienna
Attendance: 47,000
Referee: Jesús Gil Manzano (Spain)

16 October 2023
18:00 (20:00 UTC+4)

Azerbaijan	0–1	Austria
	Report	Sabitzer 48' (pen.)

Tofiq Bahramov Republican Stadium, Baku
Attendance: 4,446
Referee: Aristotelis Diamantopoulos (Greece)
16 October 2023
20:45

Belgium	1–1 (Note: The Belgium v Sweden match was abandoned at 1–1 at half-time for security reasons, as two Swedish supporters were killed in a terrorist shooting in Brussels before the match; the score was later confirmed as final.)	Sweden
Lukaku 31' (pen.)	Report	Gyökeres 15'

King Baudouin Stadium, Brussels
Attendance: 35,000
Referee: Maurizio Mariani (Italy)

16 November 2023
18:00 (21:00 UTC+4)

Azerbaijan	3–0	Sweden
Mahmudov 3', 89'; Dadashov 6'	Report

Tofiq Bahramov Republican Stadium, Baku
Attendance: 5,570
Referee: Esther Staubli (Switzerland)
16 November 2023
18:00 (19:00 UTC+2)

Estonia	0–2	Austria
	Report	Laimer 25'; Lienhart 39'

Lilleküla Stadium, Tallinn
Attendance: 4,488
Referee: Nikola Dabanović (Montenegro)

19 November 2023
18:00

Belgium	5–0	Azerbaijan
Lukaku 17', 26', 30', 37'; Trossard 90'	Report

King Baudouin Stadium, Brussels
Attendance: 30,276
Referee: Gergő Bogár (Hungary)
19 November 2023
18:00

Sweden	2–0	Estonia
Claesson 22'; Forsberg 55'	Report

Friends Arena, Solna
Attendance: 11,201
Referee: Fabio Maresca (Italy)

== Goalscorers ==
There were 62 goals scored in 20 matches, for an average of 3.1 goals per match.

14 goals

- (Belgium national football team) Romelu Lukaku

4 goals

- (Austria national football team) Marcel Sabitzer

3 goals

- (Austria national football team) Christoph Baumgartner
- (Austria national football team) Michael Gregoritsch
- (Azerbaijan national football team) Emin Mahmudov
- (Sweden men's national football team) Viktor Gyökeres

2 goals

- (Austria national football team) Marko Arnautović
- (Austria national football team) Konrad Laimer
- (Belgium national football team) Dodi Lukebakio
- (Belgium national football team) Leandro Trossard
- (Estonia national football team) Rauno Sappinen
- (Sweden men's national football team) Viktor Claesson
- (Sweden men's national football team) Emil Forsberg

1 goal

- (Austria national football team) Florian Kainz
- (Austria national football team) Philipp Lienhart
- (Azerbaijan national football team) Toral Bayramov
- (Azerbaijan national football team) Renat Dadashov
- (Azerbaijan national football team) Anton Kryvotsyuk
- (Azerbaijan national football team) Ramil Sheydayev
- (Belgium national football team) Johan Bakayoko
- (Belgium national football team) Yannick Carrasco
- (Belgium national football team) Charles De Ketelaere
- (Belgium national football team) Jan Vertonghen
- (Sweden men's national football team) Anthony Elanga
- (Sweden men's national football team) Emil Holm
- (Sweden men's national football team) Alexander Isak
- (Sweden men's national football team) Jesper Karlsson
- (Sweden men's national football team) Dejan Kulusevski
- (Sweden men's national football team) Robin Quaison

1 own goal

- (Azerbaijan national football team) Behlul Mustafazade (against Sweden)
- (Belgium national football team) Orel Mangala (against Austria)

== Discipline ==
A player was automatically suspended for the next match for the following offences:

- Receiving a red card (red card suspensions could be extended for serious offences)
- Receiving three yellow cards in three different matches, as well as after the fifth and any subsequent yellow card (yellow card suspensions could be carried forward to the play-offs, but not the finals or any other future international matches)

The following suspensions were served during the qualifying matches:

Team	Player	Offence(s)	Suspended for match(es)
Austria	Guido Burgstaller	(yellow card) (yellow-red card) vs Azerbaijan (16 October 2023)	vs Estonia (16 November 2023)
Belgium	Amadou Onana	(yellow card) (yellow-red card) vs Austria (13 October 2023)	vs Sweden (16 October 2023)
Estonia	Karol Mets	(yellow card) vs Azerbaijan (17 June 2023); (yellow card) vs Sweden (9 September 2023); (yellow card) vs Belgium (12 September 2023)	vs Azerbaijan (13 October 2023)
Estonia	Mattias Käit	(yellow card) vs Austria (27 March 2023); (yellow card) vs Azerbaijan (17 June 2023); (yellow card) vs Azerbaijan (13 October 2023)	vs Austria (16 November 2023)
