= UEFA Euro 2024 qualifying Group A =

Group A of UEFA Euro 2024 qualifying was one of the ten groups to decide which teams would qualify for the UEFA Euro 2024 final tournament in Germany. Group A consisted of five teams: Cyprus, Georgia, Norway, Scotland and Spain. The teams played against each other home-and-away in a round-robin format.

Originally Gibraltar had been drawn in this group, but they were moved to group B due to Spain not being willing to play them because of the disputed status of Gibraltar.

The top two teams, Spain and Scotland, qualified directly for the final tournament. The participants of the qualifying play-offs were decided based on their performance in the 2022–23 UEFA Nations League.

== Standings ==
Pos	Team	Pld	W	D	L	GF	GA	GD	Pts	Qualification	(Spain)	(Scotland)	(Norway)	(Georgia (country))	(Cyprus)
1	Spain	8	7	0	1	25	5	+20	21	Qualify for final tournament	—	2–0	3–0	3–1	6–0
2	Scotland	8	5	2	1	17	8	+9	17	Qualify for final tournament	2–0	—	3–3	2–0	3–0
3	Norway	8	3	2	3	14	12	+2	11		0–1	1–2	—	2–1	3–1
4	Georgia	8	2	2	4	12	18	−6	8	Advance to play-offs via Nations League	1–7	2–2	1–1	—	4–0
5	Cyprus	8	0	0	8	3	28	−25	0		1–3	0–3	0–4	1–2	—

Source: UEFA
Rules for classification: Qualification tiebreakers

== Matches ==
The fixture list was confirmed by UEFA on 10 October 2022, the day after the draw. Times are CET/CEST, (Note: CET (UTC+1) for matches until 25 March and from 29 October (matchday 1 and 9–10), and CEST (UTC+2) for matches from 26 March to 28 October 2023 (matchday 2–8).) as listed by UEFA (local times, if different, are in parentheses).

25 March 2023
15:00 (14:00 UTC±0)

Scotland	3–0	Cyprus
McGinn 21'; McTominay 87', 90+3'	Report

Hampden Park, Glasgow
Attendance: 48,195
Referee: Duje Strukan (Croatia)
25 March 2023
20:45

Spain	3–0	Norway
Olmo 13'; Joselu 84', 85'	Report

La Rosaleda, Málaga
Attendance: 29,214
Referee: Benoît Bastien (France)

28 March 2023
18:00 (20:00 UTC+4)

Georgia	1–1	Norway
Mikautadze 60'	Report	Sørloth 15'

Batumi Stadium, Batumi
Attendance: 20,300
Referee: Andris Treimanis (Latvia)
28 March 2023
20:45 (19:45 UTC+1)

Scotland	2–0	Spain
McTominay 7', 51'	Report

Hampden Park, Glasgow
Attendance: 47,976
Referee: Sandro Schärer (Switzerland) (Note: Sandro Schärer suffered an injury. He was replaced by the fourth official Lukas Fähndrich (Switzerland) at half-time.)

17 June 2023
18:00

Norway	1–2	Scotland
Haaland 61' (pen.)	Report	Dykes 87'; McLean 89'

Ullevaal Stadion, Oslo
Attendance: 25,791
Referee: Matej Jug (Slovenia)
17 June 2023
20:45 (21:45 UTC+3)

Cyprus	1–2	Georgia
Pittas 39' (pen.)	Report	Mikautadze 31'; Davitashvili 84'

AEK Arena – Georgios Karapatakis, Larnaca
Attendance: 3,763
Referee: Fábio Veríssimo (Portugal)

20 June 2023
20:45

Norway	3–1	Cyprus
Solbakken 12'; Haaland 56' (pen.), 60'	Report	Kastanos 90+3'

Ullevaal Stadion, Oslo
Attendance: 23,643
Referee: Aleksandar Stavrev (North Macedonia)
20 June 2023
20:45 (19:45 UTC+1)

Scotland	2–0	Georgia
McGregor 6'; McTominay 47'	Report

Hampden Park, Glasgow
Attendance: 50,062
Referee: István Vad (Hungary)

8 September 2023
18:00 (20:00 UTC+4)

Georgia	1–7	Spain
Chakvetadze 49'	Report	Morata 22', 40', 66'; Kvirkvelia 27' (o.g.); Olmo 38'; Williams 68'; Yamal 74'

Dinamo Arena, Tbilisi
Attendance: 51,694
Referee: Daniel Siebert (Germany)
8 September 2023
20:45 (21:45 UTC+3)

Cyprus	0–3	Scotland
	Report	McTominay 6'; Porteous 16'; McGinn 30'

AEK Arena – Georgios Karapatakis, Larnaca
Attendance: 6,633
Referee: Balázs Berke (Hungary)

12 September 2023
20:45

Norway	2–1	Georgia
Haaland 25'; Ødegaard 33'	Report	Zivzivadze 90+1'

Ullevaal Stadion, Oslo
Attendance: 23,665
Referee: Nikola Dabanović (Montenegro)
12 September 2023
20:45

Spain	6–0	Cyprus
Gavi 18'; Merino 33'; Joselu 70'; F. Torres 73', 83'; Baena 77'	Report

Nuevo Los Cármenes, Granada
Attendance: 17,311
Referee: Simone Sozza (Italy)

12 October 2023
20:45 (21:45 UTC+3)

Cyprus	0–4	Norway
	Report	Sørloth 33'; Haaland 65', 72'; Aursnes 81'

AEK Arena – Georgios Karapatakis, Larnaca
Attendance: 7,206
Referee: Donatas Rumšas (Lithuania)
12 October 2023
20:45

Spain	2–0	Scotland
Morata 73'; Sancet 86'	Report

La Cartuja, Seville
Attendance: 45,623
Referee: Serdar Gözübüyük (Netherlands)

15 October 2023
15:00 (17:00 UTC+4)

Georgia	4–0	Cyprus
Kiteishvili 46'; Kvaratskhelia 58'; Shengelia 82'; Mikautadze 90+5' (pen.)	Report

Mikheil Meskhi Stadium, Tbilisi
Attendance: 15,871
Referee: Robert Jones (England)
15 October 2023
20:45

Norway	0–1	Spain
	Report	Gavi 49'

Ullevaal Stadion, Oslo
Attendance: 25,885
Referee: Tobias Stieler (Germany)

16 November 2023
18:00 (21:00 UTC+4)

Georgia	2–2	Scotland
Kvaratskhelia 15', 57'	Report	McTominay 49'; Shankland 90+2'

Dinamo Arena, Tbilisi
Attendance: 44,595
Referee: Aleksandar Stavrev (North Macedonia)
16 November 2023
18:00 (19:00 UTC+2)

Cyprus	1–3	Spain
Pileas 75'	Report	Yamal 5'; Oyarzabal 22'; Joselu 28'

Alphamega Stadium, Limassol
Attendance: 9,667
Referee: Mykola Balakin (Ukraine)

19 November 2023
20:45 (19:45 UTC±0)

Scotland	3–3	Norway
McGinn 13'; Østigård 33' (o.g.); Armstrong 59'	Report	Dønnum 3'; Larsen 20'; Elyounoussi 86'

Hampden Park, Glasgow
Attendance: 48,138
Referee: Horațiu Feșnic (Romania)
19 November 2023
20:45

Spain	3–1	Georgia
Le Normand 4'; F. Torres 55'; Lochoshvili 72' (o.g.)	Report	Kvaratskhelia 10'

José Zorrilla, Valladolid
Attendance: 24,146
Referee: Ovidiu Hațegan (Romania)

== Goalscorers ==
There were 71 goals scored in 20 matches, for an average of 3.55 goals per match.

7 goals

- (Scotland) Scott McTominay

6 goals

- (Norway) Erling Haaland

4 goals

- (Georgia (country)) Khvicha Kvaratskhelia
- (Spain) Joselu
- (Spain) Álvaro Morata

3 goals

- (Georgia (country)) Georges Mikautadze
- (Scotland) John McGinn
- (Spain) Ferran Torres

2 goals

- (Norway) Alexander Sørloth
- (Spain) Gavi
- (Spain) Dani Olmo
- (Spain) Lamine Yamal

1 goal

- (Cyprus) Grigoris Kastanos
- (Cyprus) Kostas Pileas
- (Cyprus) Ioannis Pittas
- (Georgia (country)) Giorgi Chakvetadze
- (Georgia (country)) Zuriko Davitashvili
- (Georgia (country)) Otar Kiteishvili
- (Georgia (country)) Levan Shengelia
- (Georgia (country)) Budu Zivzivadze
- (Norway) Fredrik Aursnes
- (Norway) Aron Dønnum
- (Norway) Mohamed Elyounoussi
- (Norway) Martin Ødegaard
- (Norway) Ola Solbakken
- (Norway) Jørgen Strand Larsen
- (Scotland) Stuart Armstrong
- (Scotland) Lyndon Dykes
- (Scotland) Callum McGregor
- (Scotland) Kenny McLean
- (Scotland) Ryan Porteous
- (Scotland) Lawrence Shankland
- (Spain) Álex Baena
- (Spain) Robin Le Normand
- (Spain) Mikel Merino
- (Spain) Mikel Oyarzabal
- (Spain) Oihan Sancet
- (Spain) Nico Williams

1 own goal

- (Georgia (country)) Solomon Kvirkvelia (against Spain)
- (Georgia (country)) Luka Lochoshvili (against Spain)
- (Norway) Leo Skiri Østigård (against Scotland)

== Discipline ==
A player was automatically suspended for the next match for the following offences:

- Receiving a red card (red card suspensions could be extended for serious offences)
- Receiving three yellow cards in three different matches, as well as after the fifth and any subsequent yellow card (yellow card suspensions could be carried forward to the play-offs, but not the finals or any other future international matches)

The following suspensions were served during the qualifying matches:

Team	Player	Offence(s)	Suspended for match(es)
Cyprus	Nicholas Ioannou	(yellow card) (yellow-red card) vs Scotland (25 March 2023)	vs Georgia (17 June 2023)
