= UEFA Euro 2024 qualifying play-offs =

Football tournament

The play-offs of the UEFA Euro 2024 qualifying tournament decided the last three teams that qualified for the UEFA Euro 2024 final tournament in Germany. The twelve participants of the play-offs were selected based on their performance in the 2022–23 UEFA Nations League. The teams were divided into three paths, each containing four teams, with each play-off path featuring two single-leg semi-finals, and one single-leg final. The three play-off path winners joined hosts Germany and the twenty other teams already qualified for UEFA Euro 2024.

Poland, Ukraine and Georgia qualified for the final tournament.

== Format ==
The twelve teams were selected based on their performance in the 2022–23 UEFA Nations League. These teams were divided into three paths, each containing four teams, with one team from each path qualifying for the final tournament.

The format was similar to that of the UEFA Euro 2020 qualifying play-offs. However, given there was one fewer qualifying spot available (as no host qualified automatically for Euro 2020), and the UEFA Nations League was restructured from the 2018–19 season, the play-offs now featured only three paths, with the now-downsized League D no longer given its own path.

=== Team selection ===
Based on the Nations League rankings, the twelve selected teams were chosen as follows, starting with League C and working up to League A:

1. All available group winners were selected.
2. If a group winner had directly qualified through the UEFA Euro 2024 qualifying group stage, then they were replaced by the next best-ranked team from the same league that had not also directly qualified.
3. If fewer than four teams from a given league had qualified, then the remaining slots for that league were allocated as follows:
  1. The best-ranked League D group winner would be selected unless this team had directly qualified.
  2. Any remaining slots would be allocated based on the Nations League overall ranking:
    - If the league had a group winner selected for the play-offs, then the next-best team in the overall ranking from a lower league was selected.
    - If the league had no group winner available, then the best team in the overall ranking was selected.

=== Path formation ===
The twelve selected teams were then allocated to paths of four teams each. The draw to allocate teams to the different paths was subject to the following general conditions:

- If four or more teams from a league entered the play-offs, a path with four teams from the league in question had to be formed.
- League B and C group winners could not form a path with a team from a higher league.
- Additional conditions could be applied, including seeding principles, subject to approval of the UEFA Executive Committee.

With these conditions, the general draw procedure was as follows, starting with League C and working up to League A:

- If there were four teams available in a given league, form a path with these four teams.
- If there were more than four teams available in a given league, draw which four teams would participate in the path of the league.
  - All remaining teams were drawn into a path of a higher league.
- If there were fewer than four teams available in a given league, draw available and eligible teams from other leagues so that four teams composed the path of the given league.

=== Match pairings and rules ===
Each play-off path featured two single-leg semi-finals, and one single-leg final, taking place in March 2024. In the semi-finals of each path, based on the Nations League rankings, the best-ranked team hosted the fourth-ranked team, and the second-ranked team hosted the third-ranked team. The host of each final was decided by a draw between the two semi-final pairings.

The play-offs were played in single-leg knockout matches. If scores were level at the end of normal time, 30 minutes of extra time were played, followed by a penalty shoot-out if the scores remained level.

== Teams selected ==
The team selection process, using a set of criteria, determined the twelve teams that would compete in the play-offs based on the Nations League overall rankings.

League A
Rank	Team
1 ^{GW}	Spain
2 ^{GW}	Croatia
3 ^{GW}	Italy
4 ^{GW}	Netherlands
5	Denmark
6	Portugal
7	Belgium
8	Hungary
9	Switzerland
10	Germany ^{†}
11	Poland
12	France
13	Austria
14	Czech Republic
15	England
16	Wales

League B
Rank	Team
17 ^{GW}	Israel
18 ^{GW}	Bosnia and Herzegovina
19 ^{GW}	Serbia
20 ^{GW}	Scotland
21	Finland
22	Ukraine
23	Iceland
24	Norway
25	Slovenia
26	Republic of Ireland
27	Albania
28	Montenegro
29	Romania
30	Sweden
31	Armenia
32	Russia ^{‡}

League C
Rank	Team
33 ^{GW}	Georgia
34 ^{GW}	Greece
35 ^{GW}	Turkey
36 ^{GW}	Kazakhstan
37	Luxembourg
38	Azerbaijan
39	Kosovo
40	Bulgaria
41	Faroe Islands
42	North Macedonia
43	Slovakia
44	Northern Ireland
45	Cyprus
46	Belarus
47	Lithuania
48	Gibraltar

League D
Rank	Team
49 ^{BD}	Estonia
50	Latvia
51	Moldova
52	Malta
53	Andorra
54	San Marino
55	Liechtenstein

Key

- ^{GW} Group winner from Nations League A, B or C
- ^{BD} Best group winner from Nations League D
- Team in bold advanced to play-offs
- Team qualified directly to final tournament
- † UEFA Euro 2024 host, qualified automatically
- ‡ Banned from qualifying competition

== Draw ==
The qualifying play-off draw took place on 23 November 2023, 12:00 CET, at the UEFA headquarters in Nyon, Switzerland. The draw followed the path formation rules to determine the paths in which the non-group winners will participate. Three separate draws determining the host of the play-off final of each path also took place between the winners of the semi-final pairings (identified as semi-final 1 for seed 1 v 4, and semi-final 2 for seed 2 v 3).

Due to the specificity of the draw, the exact procedure could only be finalised following the conclusion of the qualifying group stage. No restrictions were applied to the draw, as none of the clashes prohibited by UEFA for political reasons could occur. (Note: The restriction would have applied to the following pairings: Armenia–Azerbaijan, Belarus–Ukraine, Gibraltar–Spain, Kosovo–Bosnia and Herzegovina, Kosovo–Serbia.) Based on the twelve teams that advanced to the play-offs, the three play-off paths were formed following the path formation rules, starting with League C and working up to League A:

- As there were four teams from League C (three group winners and one non-group winner), they were all placed in Path C.
- As there were five teams from League B (two group winners and three non-group winners), the two group winners were placed in Path B, while a draw decided which two of the three non-group winners were also placed in Path B.
- As there were two teams from League A (both non-group winners), they were both placed in Path A, along with the best-ranked League D group winner. The one remaining non-group winner from League B that was not drawn to Path B was then placed in Path A.

The following three non-group winners from League B (ordered by Nations League ranking) took part in the draw, with two being drawn into Path B, while the remaining team was allocated to Path A:

1. Finland
2. Ukraine
3. Iceland

The two teams drawn into Path B occupied positions B3 and B4, following their Nations League ranking, while the team drawn into Path A occupied position A3.

The following was the composition of the play-off paths:

Path A
Rank	Team
1	Poland
2	Wales
3	Finland
4	Estonia

Path B
Rank	Team
1	Israel
2	Bosnia and Herzegovina
3	Ukraine
4	Iceland

Path C
Rank	Team
1	Georgia
2	Greece
3	Kazakhstan
4	Luxembourg

The following semi-final winners were drawn to host the play-off final:

- Path A: Winner semi-final 2 (Wales v Finland)
- Path B: Winner semi-final 2 (Bosnia and Herzegovina v Ukraine)
- Path C: Winner semi-final 1 (Georgia v Luxembourg)

== Schedule ==
The semi-finals took place on 21 March, while the final matches took place five days later on 26 March 2024. The losing semi-finalists in each path still competed in a friendly on the day of the final, hosted by the team that was drawn to hold the play-off final. However, the friendly match between Bosnia and Herzegovina and Israel was cancelled by both Federations and UEFA due to security reasons related to the Gaza war.

Times are CET (UTC+1), as listed by UEFA (local times, if different, are in parentheses).

== Path A ==
The winner of Path A, Poland, entered Group D in the final tournament.

=== Bracket ===
Semi-finals
21 March 2024 – Cardiff
Wales	4
Finland	1
21 March 2024 – Warsaw
Poland	5
Estonia	1

Final
26 March 2024 – Cardiff
Wales	0 (4)
Poland (p)	0 (5)

=== Semi-finals ===
21 March 2024
20:45

Poland	5–1	Estonia
Frankowski 22'; Zieliński 50'; Piotrowski 70'; Mets 74' (o.g.); S. Szymański 76'	Report	Vetkal 78'

Stadion Narodowy, Warsaw
Attendance: 53,868
Referee: Slavko Vinčić (Slovenia)

21 March 2024
20:45 (19:45 UTC+0)

Wales	4–1	Finland
Brooks 3'; Williams 38'; Johnson 47'; D. James 86'	Report	Pukki 45'

Cardiff City Stadium, Cardiff
Attendance: 32,162
Referee: István Kovács (Romania)

=== Final ===
26 March 2024
20:45 (19:45 UTC+0)

Wales	0–0 (a.e.t.)	Poland
	Report
Penalties
B. Davies (penalty scored); Moore (penalty scored); Wilson (penalty scored); Williams (penalty scored); D. James (penalty missed)	4–5	(penalty scored) Lewandowski; (penalty scored) S. Szymański; (penalty scored) Frankowski; (penalty scored) Zalewski; (penalty scored) Piątek

Cardiff City Stadium, Cardiff
Attendance: 31,876
Referee: Daniele Orsato (Italy)

== Path B ==
The winner of Path B, Ukraine, entered Group E in the final tournament.

=== Bracket ===
Semi-finals
21 March 2024 – Zenica
Bosnia and Herzegovina	1
Ukraine	2
21 March 2024 – Budapest
Israel	1
Iceland	4

Final
26 March 2024 – Wrocław
Ukraine	2
Iceland	1

=== Semi-finals ===
21 March 2024
20:45

Israel	1–4	Iceland
Zahavi 31' (pen.)	Report	A. Guðmundsson 39', 83', 87'; Traustason 42'

Szusza Ferenc Stadion, Budapest (Hungary) (Note: Due to the Gaza war, Israel were required to play their home matches at neutral venues until further notice.)
Attendance: 1,226
Referee: Anthony Taylor (England)

21 March 2024
20:45

Bosnia and Herzegovina	1–2	Ukraine
Matviyenko 56' (o.g.)	Report	Yaremchuk 85'; Dovbyk 88'

Bilino Polje Stadium, Zenica
Attendance: 10,992
Referee: Felix Zwayer (Germany)

=== Final ===
26 March 2024
20:45

Ukraine	2–1	Iceland
Tsyhankov 54'; Mudryk 84'	Report	A. Guðmundsson 30'

Wrocław Stadium, Wrocław (Poland) (Note: Due to the Russian invasion of Ukraine, Ukraine were required to play their home matches at neutral venues until further notice.)
Attendance: 29,310
Referee: Clément Turpin (France)

== Path C ==
The winner of Path C, Georgia, entered Group F in the final tournament.

=== Bracket ===
Semi-finals
21 March 2024 – Tbilisi
Georgia	2
Luxembourg	0
21 March 2024 – Athens
Greece	5
Kazakhstan	0

Final
26 March 2024 – Tbilisi
Georgia (p)	0 (4)
Greece	0 (2)

=== Semi-finals ===
21 March 2024
18:00 (21:00 UTC+4)

Georgia	2–0	Luxembourg
Zivzivadze 40', 63'	Report

Boris Paichadze Dinamo Arena, Tbilisi
Attendance: 51,404
Referee: José María Sánchez Martínez (Spain)

21 March 2024
20:45 (21:45 UTC+2)

Greece	5–0	Kazakhstan
Bakasetas 9' (pen.); Pelkas 15'; Ioannidis 37'; Kourbelis 40'; Tapalov 85' (o.g.)	Report

Agia Sophia Stadium, Athens
Attendance: 25,200
Referee: Danny Makkelie (Netherlands)

=== Final ===
26 March 2024
18:00 (21:00 UTC+4)

Georgia	0–0 (a.e.t.)	Greece
	Report
Penalties
Kochorashvili (penalty scored); Davitashvili (penalty scored); Mikautadze (penalty missed); Dvali (penalty scored); Kvekveskiri (penalty scored)	4–2	(penalty missed) Bakasetas; (penalty scored) Masouras; (penalty scored) Bouchalakis; (penalty missed) Giakoumakis

Boris Paichadze Dinamo Arena, Tbilisi
Attendance: 44,000
Referee: Szymon Marciniak (Poland)

== Goalscorers ==
There were 29 goals scored in 9 matches, for an average of 3.22 goals per match.

4 goals

- (Iceland) Albert Guðmundsson

2 goals

- (Georgia (country)) Budu Zivzivadze

1 goal

- (Estonia) Martin Vetkal
- (Finland) Teemu Pukki
- (Greece) Anastasios Bakasetas
- (Greece) Fotis Ioannidis
- (Greece) Dimitrios Kourbelis
- (Greece) Dimitrios Pelkas
- (Iceland) Arnór Ingvi Traustason
- (Israel) Eran Zahavi
- (Poland) Przemysław Frankowski
- (Poland) Jakub Piotrowski
- (Poland) Sebastian Szymański
- (Poland) Piotr Zieliński
- (Ukraine) Artem Dovbyk
- (Ukraine) Mykhailo Mudryk
- (Ukraine) Viktor Tsyhankov
- (Ukraine) Roman Yaremchuk
- (Wales) David Brooks
- (Wales) Daniel James
- (Wales) Brennan Johnson
- (Wales) Neco Williams

1 own goal

- (Estonia) Karol Mets (against Poland)
- (Kazakhstan) Yerkin Tapalov (against Greece)
- (Ukraine) Mykola Matviyenko (against Bosnia and Herzegovina)

== Discipline ==
A player was automatically suspended for the next match for the following offences:

- Receiving a red card (red card suspensions could be extended for serious offences)
- From the qualifying group stage, receiving three yellow cards in three different matches, as well as after fifth and any subsequent yellow card (yellow card suspensions were carried forward to the play-offs, but not the finals or any other future international matches)

Cautions that did not result in a suspension expired on completion of the qualifying group stage, and were not carried forward to the play-offs.

The following suspensions were served during the qualifying play-offs:

Team	Player	Offence(s)	Suspended for match(es)
Bosnia and Herzegovina	Renato Gojković	(yellow card) (yellow-red card) in Group J vs Slovakia (19 November 2023)	Semi-finals vs Ukraine (21 March 2024)
Estonia	Maksim Paskotši	(red card) in Semi-finals vs Poland (21 March 2024)	~~Potential final vs Finland or Wales (26 March 2024)~~ (Note: As the team was eliminated, the suspension was served outside the tournament.)
Georgia	Khvicha Kvaratskhelia	(yellow card) in Group A vs Spain (8 September 2023); (yellow card) in Group A vs Scotland (16 November 2023); (yellow card) in Group A vs Spain (19 November 2023)	Semi-finals vs Luxembourg (21 March 2024)
Georgia	Giorgi Loria	(red card) in Final vs Greece (26 March 2024)	Group F (final tournament) vs Turkey (matchday 1; 18 June 2024)
Israel	Roy Revivo	(red card) in Semi-finals vs Iceland (21 March 2024)	~~Potential final vs Bosnia and Herzegovina or Ukraine (26 March 2024)~~
Kazakhstan	Nuraly Alip	(yellow card) in Group H vs Northern Ireland (19 June 2023); (yellow card) in Group H vs Denmark (14 October 2023); (yellow card) in Group H vs Slovenia (20 November 2023)	Semi-finals vs Greece (21 March 2024)
Luxembourg	Danel Sinani	(red card) in Group J vs Liechtenstein (19 November 2023)	Semi-finals vs Georgia (21 March 2024); ~~Potential final vs Greece or Kazakhstan (26 March 2024)~~
Luxembourg	Maxime Chanot	(red card) in Semi-finals vs Georgia (21 March 2024)	~~Potential final vs Greece or Kazakhstan (26 March 2024)~~
