= Martin Vetkal =

Estonian footballer (born 2004)

Personal information
- Date of birth: 21 February 2004 (age 22)
- Place of birth: Tallinn, Estonia
- Height: 1.81 m (5 ft 11 in)
- Position: Midfielder

Team information
- Current team: Dordrecht
- Number: 21

Youth career
- –2011: JK Püsivus Kohila
- 2012–2019: Tallinna Kalev
- 2020–2024: Roma

Senior career*
| Years | Team | Apps | (Gls) |
| 2019–2020 | Tallinna Kalev | 19 | (1) |
| 2023–2024 | Roma | 0 | (0) |
| 2024–2025 | IF Brommapojkarna | 4 | (0) |
| 2025– | Dordrecht | 32 | (0) |

International career^{‡}
| 2018 | Estonia U16 | 1 | (0) |
| 2019 | Estonia U17 | 11 | (1) |
| 2021–2023 | Estonia U19 | 13 | (1) |
| 2022–2023 | Estonia U21 | 5 | (0) |
| 2023– | Estonia | 15 | (1) |
- * Club domestic league appearances and goals as of 25 April 2026 ‡ National team caps and goals as of 18 November 2025

Martin Vetkal (born 21 February 2004) is an Estonian professional footballer who plays as a midfielder for Eerste Divisie club Dordrecht and the Estonia national team.

== Club career ==
Vetkal made his Premium Liiga debut for Tallinna Kalev on 21 June 2019 in a match against FC Flora, having required special authorisation from the Estonian Football Association to play at the age of 15.

On 9 November 2019, he became the league's youngest-ever goalscorer when he scored against Viljandi JK Tulevik at 15 years and 261 days. His performances at such a young age led to him being regarded as one of the most promising midfielders of his generation in Europe.

Following his debut season in Estonia, he spent time with several Italian clubs such as Genoa, SPAL and Sassuolo. In March 2020 he did a test for Schalke 04, along with his teammate Tristan Toomas Teeväli.

He signed for Roma in August 2020. During the 2022–23 season, he was part of Roma's under-19 squad that won the Coppa Italia Primavera. During his time with Roma, he was called up to the senior squad only once, in December 2023 for the Europa League game against Sheriff Tiraspol, and remained on the bench in that game.

On 18 July 2025, Vetkal signed a three-year contract with Dordrecht in the Netherlands.

== International career ==
Vetkal has represented Estonia at various youth international levels. He was set to play in the 2020 UEFA European Under-17 Championship, originally planned to be held in his homecountry, before the tournament was cancelled due to the outbreak of the COVID-19 pandemic.

On 13 October 2023, Vetkal made his senior debut for Estonia in a Euro qualification against Azerbaijan in the 63rd minute as a substitute. On 21 March 2024, he scored his first goal for the national team in a 1–5 Euro qualifying play-off loss against Poland.

== Career statistics ==
=== International ===
As of match played 18 November 2025

Appearances and goals by national team and year
| National team | Year | Apps | Goals |
|---|---|---|---|
| Estonia | 2023 | 3 | 0 |
| Estonia | 2024 | 10 | 1 |
| Estonia | 2025 | 2 | 0 |
| Estonia | Total | 15 | 1 |

Scores and results list Estonia's goal tally first, score column indicates score after each Vetkal goal.

List of international goals scored by Martin Vetkal
| No. | Date | Venue | Opponent | Score | Result | Competition |
|---|---|---|---|---|---|---|
| 1 | 21 March 2024 | National Stadium, Warsaw, Poland | Poland | 1–5 | 1–5 | UEFA Euro 2024 qualifying |

== Honours ==
Roma U19

- Coppa Italia Primavera: 2022–23
